= List of municipalities in Wallonia =

Divisions in southern Belgium region

Wallonia is a region located in southern Belgium, and divided into 261 municipalities, listed in the table below. The numbers refer to the location of the municipalities on the maps of the respective provinces.

Nine municipalities –located in the arrondissement of Verviers (province of Liège)– form the German-speaking Community of Belgium, being Eupen, Kelmis, Raeren, Lontzen, Büllingen, Bütgenbach, Burg-Reuland, Amel and Sankt Vith. The German-speaking Community Government has authority over these municipalities.

== List ==
A - B - C - D - E - F - G - H - I - J - K - L - M - N - O - P - Q - R - S - T - U - V - W - X - Y - Z

Hainaut

Walloon Brabant

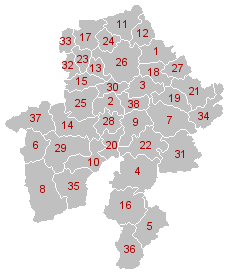
Namur

Liège

Luxembourg

Commune	City	Province	#
Aiseau-Presles		Hainaut	1
Amay		Liège	1
Amel; Amblève (in French)		Liège	2
Andenne	City	Namur	1
Anderlues		Hainaut	2
Anhée		Namur	2
Ans		Liège	3
Anthisnes		Liège	4
Antoing	City	Hainaut	3
Arlon	City	Luxembourg	1
Assesse		Namur	3
Ath	City	Hainaut	4
Attert		Luxembourg	2
Aubange	City	Luxembourg	3
Aubel		Liège	5
Awans		Liège	6
Aywaille		Liège	7
Baelen		Liège	8
Bassenge		Liège	9
Bastogne	City	Luxembourg	4
Beaumont	City	Hainaut	5
Beauraing	City	Namur	4
Beauvechain		Walloon Brabant	1
Belœil		Hainaut	6
Berloz		Liège	10
Bernissart		Hainaut	7
Bertrix		Luxembourg	6
Beyne-Heusay		Liège	11
Bièvre		Namur	5
Binche	City	Hainaut	8
Blegny		Liège	12
Bouillon	City	Luxembourg	7
Boussu		Hainaut	9
Braine-l'Alleud		Walloon Brabant	2
Braine-le-Château		Walloon Brabant	3
Braine-le-Comte	City	Hainaut	10
Braives		Liège	13
Brugelette		Hainaut	11
Brunehaut		Hainaut	12
Büllingen; Bullange (in French)		Liège	14
Burdinne		Liège	15
Burg-Reuland		Liège	16
Bütgenbach; Butgenbach (in French)		Liège	17
Celles		Hainaut	13
Cerfontaine		Namur	6
Chapelle-lez-Herlaimont		Hainaut	14
Charleroi	City	Hainaut	15
Chastre		Walloon Brabant	4
Châtelet	City	Hainaut	16
Chaudfontaine		Liège	18
Chaumont-Gistoux		Walloon Brabant	5
Chièvres	City	Hainaut	17
Chimay	City	Hainaut	18
Chiny	City	Luxembourg	8
Ciney	City	Namur	7
Clavier		Liège	19
Colfontaine		Hainaut	19
Comblain-au-Pont		Liège	20
Comines-Warneton; Komen-Waasten (in Dutch)	City	Hainaut	20
Courcelles		Hainaut	21
Court-Saint-Étienne		Walloon Brabant	6
Couvin	City	Namur	8
Crisnée		Liège	21
Dalhem		Liège	22
Daverdisse		Luxembourg	9
Dinant	City	Namur	9
Dison		Liège	23
Doische		Namur	10
Donceel		Liège	24
Dour		Hainaut	22
Durbuy	City	Luxembourg	10
Écaussinnes		Hainaut	23
Éghezée		Namur	11
Ellezelles		Hainaut	24
Enghien; Edingen (in Dutch)	City	Hainaut	25
Engis		Liège	25
Érezée		Luxembourg	11
Erquelinnes		Hainaut	26
Esneux		Liège	26
Estaimpuis		Hainaut	27
Estinnes		Hainaut	28
Étalle		Luxembourg	12
Eupen	City	Liège	27
Faimes		Liège	28
Farciennes		Hainaut	29
Fauvillers		Luxembourg	13
Fernelmont		Namur	12
Ferrières		Liège	29
Fexhe-le-Haut-Clocher		Liège	30
Flémalle		Liège	31
Fléron		Liège	32
Fleurus	City	Hainaut	30
Flobecq; Vloesberg (in Dutch)		Hainaut	31
Floreffe		Namur	13
Florennes		Namur	14
Florenville	City	Luxembourg	14
Fontaine-l'Évêque	City	Hainaut	32
Fosses-la-Ville	City	Namur	15
Frameries		Hainaut	33
Frasnes-lez-Anvaing		Hainaut	34
Froidchapelle		Hainaut	35
Gedinne		Namur	16
Geer		Liège	33
Gembloux	City	Namur	17
Genappe	City	Walloon Brabant	7
Gerpinnes		Hainaut	36
Gesves		Namur	18
Gouvy		Luxembourg	15
Grâce-Hollogne		Liège	34
Grez-Doiceau		Walloon Brabant	8
Habay		Luxembourg	16
Hamoir		Liège	35
Hamois		Namur	19
Ham-sur-Heure-Nalinnes		Hainaut	37
Hannut	City	Liège	36
Hastière		Namur	20
Havelange		Namur	21
Hélécine		Walloon Brabant	9
Hensies		Hainaut	38
Herbeumont		Luxembourg	17
Héron		Liège	37
Herstal	City	Liège	38
Herve	City	Liège	39
Honnelles		Hainaut	39
Hotton		Luxembourg	18
Houffalize	City	Luxembourg	19
Houyet		Namur	22
Huy	City	Liège	40
Incourt		Walloon Brabant	10
Ittre		Walloon Brabant	11
Jalhay		Liège	41
Jemeppe-sur-Sambre		Namur	23
Jodoigne	City	Walloon Brabant	12
Juprelle		Liège	42
Jurbise		Hainaut	40
Kelmis; La Calamine (in French)		Liège	43
La Bruyère		Namur	24
La Hulpe		Walloon Brabant	13
La Louvière	City	Hainaut	41
La Roche-en-Ardenne	City	Luxembourg	20
Lasne		Walloon Brabant	14
Léglise		Luxembourg	21
Lens		Hainaut	43
Le Rœulx	City	Hainaut	42
Les Bons Villers		Hainaut	44
Lessines	City	Hainaut	45
Leuze-en-Hainaut	City	Hainaut	46
Libin		Luxembourg	22
Libramont-Chevigny		Luxembourg	23
Liège	City	Liège	44
Lierneux		Liège	45
Limbourg	City	Liège	46
Lincent		Liège	47
Lobbes		Hainaut	47
Lontzen		Liège	48
Malmedy	City	Liège	49
Manage		Hainaut	48
Manhay		Luxembourg	24
Marche-en-Famenne	City	Luxembourg	25
Marchin		Liège	50
Martelange		Luxembourg	26
Meix-devant-Virton		Luxembourg	27
Merbes-le-Château		Hainaut	49
Messancy		Luxembourg	28
Mettet		Namur	25
Modave		Liège	51
Momignies		Hainaut	50
Mons	City	Hainaut	51
Mont-de-l'Enclus		Hainaut	52
Montigny-le-Tilleul		Hainaut	53
Mont-Saint-Guibert		Walloon Brabant	15
Morlanwelz		Hainaut	54
Mouscron; Moeskroen (in Dutch)	City	Hainaut	55
Musson		Luxembourg	29
Namur	City	Namur	26
Nandrin		Liège	52
Nassogne		Luxembourg	30
Neufchâteau	City	Luxembourg	31
Neupré		Liège	53
Nivelles	City	Walloon Brabant	16
Ohey		Namur	27
Olne		Liège	54
Onhaye		Namur	28
Oreye		Liège	55
Orp-Jauche		Walloon Brabant	17
Ottignies-Louvain-la-Neuve	City	Walloon Brabant	18
Ouffet		Liège	56
Oupeye		Liège	57
Paliseul		Luxembourg	32
Pecq		Hainaut	56
Pepinster		Liège	58
Péruwelz	City	Hainaut	57
Perwez		Walloon Brabant	19
Philippeville	City	Namur	29
Plombières		Liège	59
Pont-à-Celles		Hainaut	58
Profondeville		Namur	30
Quaregnon		Hainaut	59
Quévy		Hainaut	60
Quiévrain		Hainaut	61
Raeren		Liège	60
Ramillies		Walloon Brabant	20
Rebecq		Walloon Brabant	21
Remicourt		Liège	61
Rendeux		Luxembourg	33
Rixensart		Walloon Brabant	22
Rochefort	City	Namur	31
Rouvroy		Luxembourg	34
Rumes		Hainaut	62
Sainte-Ode		Luxembourg	35
Saint-Georges-sur-Meuse		Liège	62
Saint-Ghislain	City	Hainaut	63
Saint-Hubert	City	Luxembourg	36
Saint-Léger-en-Gaume		Luxembourg	37
Saint-Nicolas		Liège	63
Sankt-Vith; Saint-Vith (in French)	City	Liège	64
Sambreville		Namur	32
Seneffe		Hainaut	64
Seraing	City	Liège	65
Silly		Hainaut	65
Sivry-Rance		Hainaut	66
Soignies	City	Hainaut	67
Sombreffe		Namur	33
Somme-Leuze		Namur	34
Soumagne		Liège	66
Spa	City	Liège	67
Sprimont		Liège	68
Stavelot	City	Liège	69
Stoumont		Liège	70
Tellin		Luxembourg	38
Tenneville		Luxembourg	39
Theux		Liège	71
Thimister-Clermont		Liège	72
Thuin	City	Hainaut	68
Tinlot		Liège	73
Tintigny		Luxembourg	40
Tournai	City	Hainaut	69
Trois-Ponts		Liège	74
Trooz		Liège	75
Tubize	City	Walloon Brabant	23
Vaux-sur-Sûre		Luxembourg	41
Verlaine		Liège	76
Verviers	City	Liège	77
Vielsalm		Luxembourg	42
Villers-la-Ville		Walloon Brabant	24
Villers-le-Bouillet		Liège	78
Viroinval		Namur	35
Virton	City	Luxembourg	43
Visé	City	Liège	79
Vresse-sur-Semois		Namur	36
Waimes; Weismes (in German)		Liège	80
Walcourt	City	Namur	37
Walhain		Walloon Brabant	25
Wanze		Liège	81
Waremme	City	Liège	82
Wasseiges		Liège	83
Waterloo		Walloon Brabant	26
Wavre	City	Walloon Brabant	27
Welkenraedt		Liège	84
Wellin		Luxembourg	44
Yvoir		Namur	38

== See also ==
- List of municipalities of Belgium
- List of former municipalities in Wallonia
- List of cities in Wallonia
