= Musson =

Municipality in Wallonia, Belgium

Musson: Mson (Walloon)
- Municipality
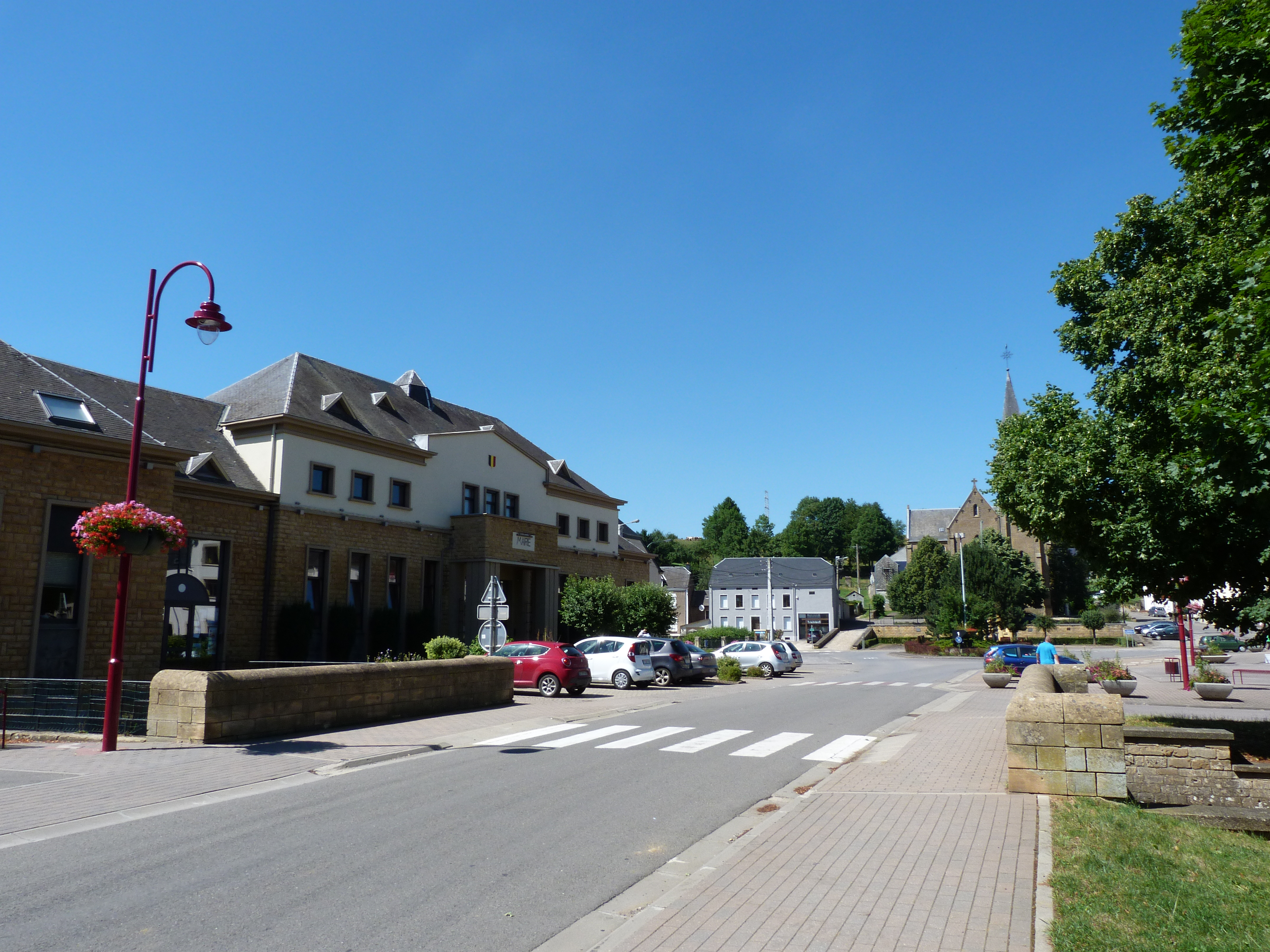

- Flag Coat of arms

- Location of Musson in Luxembourg province
- Interactive map of Musson
- Location in Belgium
- Coordinates: 49°33.5′N 05°42.3′E
- Country: Belgium
- Community: French Community
- Region: Wallonia
- Province: Luxembourg
- Arrondissement: Virton

Government
  - Mayor: Sylvie Guillaume
  - Governing party: VIVR'ENSEMBLE-ECHO

Area
  - Total: 35.37 km^{2} (13.66 sq mi)

Population (2018-01-01)
  - Total: 4,508
  - Density: 127.5/km^{2} (330.1/sq mi)
- Postal codes: 6750
- NIS code: 85026
- Area codes: 063
- Website: (in French) musson.be

Musson (French pronunciation: [mysɔ̃]; Walloon: Mson or Grand Mson; Luxembourgish: Ëmsong) is a municipality of Wallonia located in the province of Luxembourg, Belgium.

On 1 January 2022 the municipality, which covers 34.81 km^{2}, had 4,650 inhabitants, giving a population density of 133.6 inhabitants per km^{2}.

The municipality consists of the following districts: Musson and Mussy-la-Ville. Other population centers include: Baranzy, Gennevaux, Signeulx, and Willancourt.

== Transport ==
Musson is not served by any highways. The closest highway entrance is exit 3 of the A28/E411 in neighbouring Aubange. There is one major national road that passes Musson proper. This is the N88 from the Luxembourg border in Athus to Virton and Florenville. Furthermore, the N82 crosses the municipality shortly, for about 800m, in the northwest, but does not serve any population centers. All N-roads are maintained by the Walloon government. The following roads cross the municipality:

- N82: Virton - Arlon
- N88: Luxembourg (Pétange) - Athus - Musson - Baranzy - Signeulx - Virton - Florenville
- N800: Musson - Rachecourt

Mussy-la-Ville, Willancourt and Gennevaux are only reachable by municipal roads. There are two border crossings with France. One from Baranzy to Gorcy and one from Signeulx to Ville-Houdlémont.

Messancy is served by the Walloon transport authority TEC with following bus lines:

- 16/161: Virton - Signeulx - Baranzy - Musson - Athus - Arlon
- 162: Virton - Signeulx - Baranzy - Willancourt
- 169: Saint-Mard - Virton - Signeulx - Baranzy - Musson - Aubange
- 19/191/199: Virton - Arlon (Passing through Musson but no bus stops)
- 39: Musson - Baranzy - Mussy-la-Ville - Ruette - Virton
- 391: Saint-Léger - Mussy-la-Ville - Ruette - Virton
- 711: Virton - Mussy-la-Ville - Baranzy - Musson - Athus
- 721: Musson - Baranzy - Willancourt - Musson - Athus - Differt
- 83: Virton - Signeulx - Baranzy - Musson - Aubange - Luxembourg (LU)

Musson is crossed by the railway line 165 between Virton and Aubange, but there are no active train stations. The closest airport with commercial flights is Luxembourg Airport 38km to the northeast.
