= Aix-sur-Cloie =

Aix-sur-Cloie Esch-op-der-Huurt (Luxembourgish)
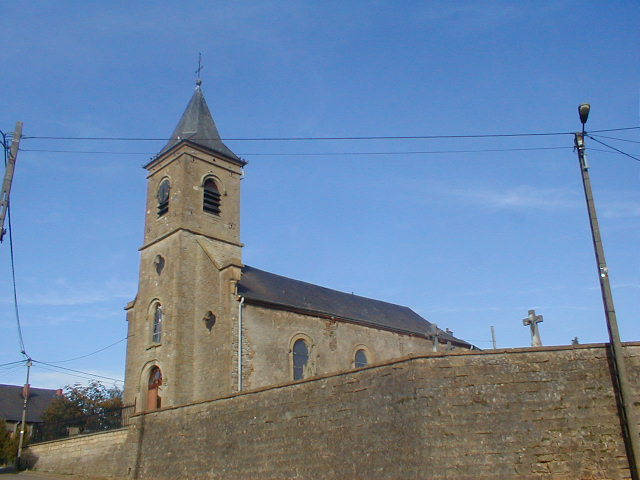
- Village church of Aix-sur-Cloie

- Location within Belgium Location within Europe
- Coordinates: 49°34′36″N 05°46′54″E
- Country: Belgium
- Region: Wallonia
- Province: Luxembourg
- Municipality: Aubange

Aix-sur-Cloie (Luxembourgish: Esch-op-der-Huurt; Walloon: Yache-so-Cloye) is a village of Wallonia in the municipality of Aubange, district of Halanzy, located in the province of Luxembourg, Belgium.

A bronze bracelet from the fourth century BC found in Aix-sur-Cloie and currently in the archaeological museum in Arlon indicates that there has been a settlement in the area since prehistoric times. Today the village contains several buildings from the 18th century, as well as several calvary sculptures.
