= Aubange =

Municipality in Wallonia, Belgium

Aubange: Éibeng (Luxembourgish); Ibingen (German)
- City and municipality
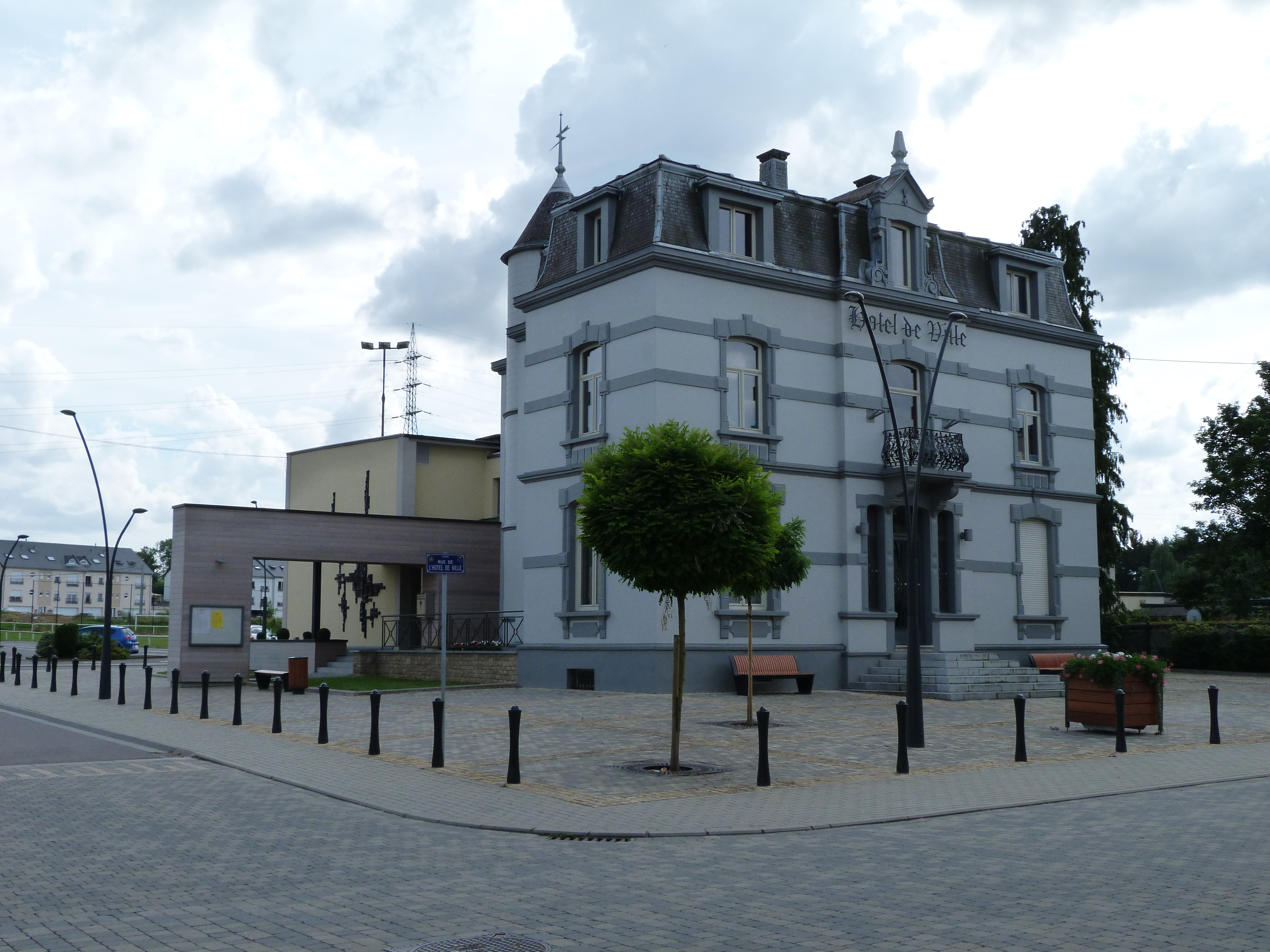
- The townhall in Athus

- Flag Coat of arms

- Location of Aubange in Luxembourg province
- Interactive map of Aubange
- Location in Belgium
- Coordinates: 49°34′N 05°48.3′E
- Country: Belgium
- Community: French Community
- Region: Wallonia
- Province: Luxembourg
- Arrondissement: Arlon

Government
  - Mayor: François Kinard (cdH)
  - Governing party: CDH.com - Intérêt Général (IG)

Area
  - Total: 46.11 km^{2} (17.80 sq mi)

Population (2018-01-01)
  - Total: 16,927
  - Density: 367.1/km^{2} (950.8/sq mi)
- Postal codes: 6790-6792
- NIS code: 81004
- Area codes: 063
- Website: www.aubange.be

Aubange (French pronunciation: [obɑ̃ʒ]; German: Ibingen [ˈiːbɪŋən]; Luxembourgish: Éibeng; Walloon: Åbindje) is a municipality and city of Wallonia located in the province of Luxembourg, Belgium.

On 1 January 2012 the municipality, which covers 45.6 km^{2}, had 16,042 inhabitants, giving a population density of 330.9 inhabitants per km^{2}. It is the third municipality of the Province of Luxembourg regarding the number of inhabitants but it is also among the smallest ones in terms of area.

The municipality is French-speaking but most of which falls within the Luxembourgish-speaking Arelerland, adjoins the tripoint where the borders of Belgium, the Grand Duchy of Luxembourg, and France meet.

The municipality consists of the following districts: Athus, Aubange, Halanzy, and Rachecourt.

== History ==
The district of Aubange was a municipality itself before the reorganization of the Belgian municipalities in 1977. Even though the new municipality took the name Aubange, the biggest place is Athus and it is where most of the services and official buildings are, like the townhall, the police station, the fire station, the post office, etc.

== Geography ==
Aubange is located in the Lorraine region in the south of Belgium just next to France and the Grand Duchy of Luxembourg.

=== Subdivisions ===
The municipality consists of the following sub-municipalities: Aubange proper, Athus, Halanzy, and Rachecourt.

Other population centers include: Aix-sur-Cloie, Battincourt, and Guerlange.

== Population ==
The following graph represents the growing of the population in the municipality since 1990. The village of Aubange itself contains about 4,000 inhabitants.

== Economy ==
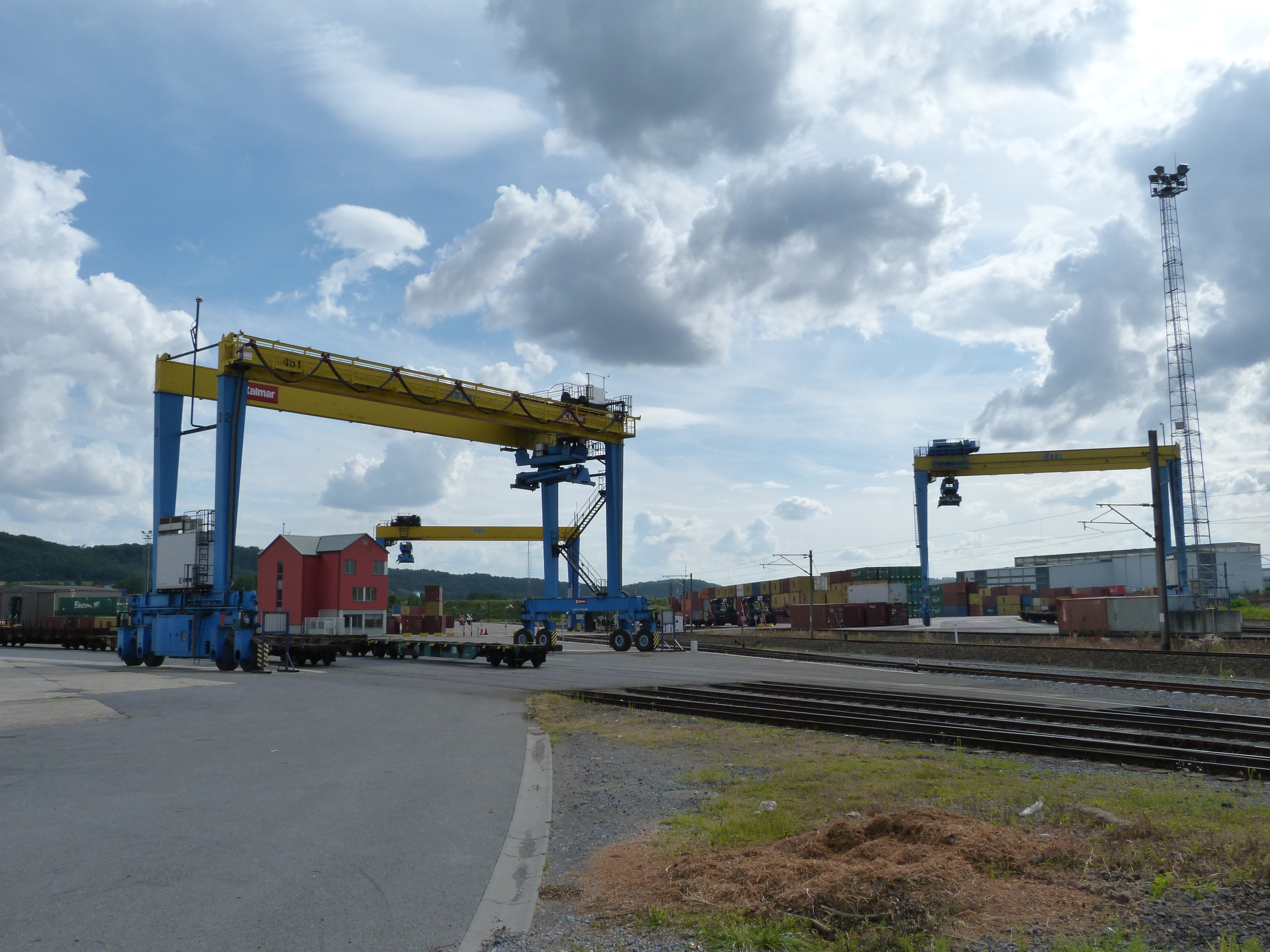
Container's Terminal in Athus

For a long time, Aubange has been linked with siderurgy. There were two big factories in Athus and in Halanzy and also a mine. But because of the concurrence of the foreign markets (especially the ones from Asia and Africa), siderurgy as not profitable anymore and all the factories closed one after another in the whole area.

Consequently, the municipality has found newer ways to develop the economy. One of the most well-known activities is the Railway Containers Terminal of Athus which deals with thousands of containers each year from the big harbors of the North Sea like Antwerp and Rotterdam to the inland of France, Germany or Luxembourg.

== Transports ==
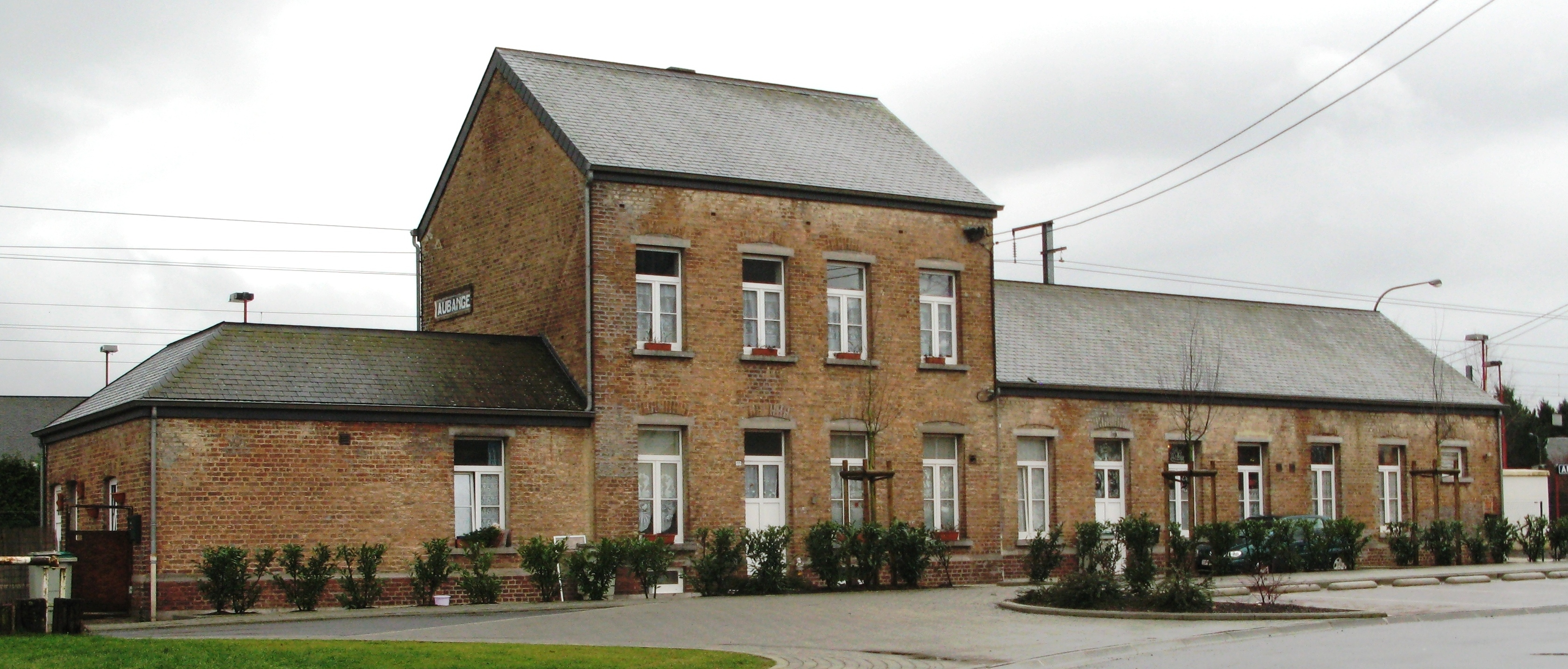
The railway station of Aubange

Aubange has a short highway: the A28/E411 with two exits: 4 Aubange and 3 Athus. The A28 continues north as the N81 towards Arlon and eventually Brussels. Going south it ends at the French border and continues in France as the N52 towards Longwy and Thionville. Besides the highway, Aubange is also crossed by the major N88 road from the Luxembourg border near Pétange, via Athus, Aubange proper and Halanzy towards Virton and Florenville. In total, the municipality is crossed by the following national roads, maintained by the Walloon Region:

- A28/E411: France (Longwy) - Aubange - Arlon
- N81: Aubange - Arlon
- N88: Luxembourg (Pétange) - Athus - Aubange - Halanzy - Virton - Florenville
- N800: Rachecourt - Musson
- N804: Luxembourg (Rodange) - Aubange
- N813: N88 - Aix-sur-Cloie - Meix-le-Tige - Étalle
- N830/E44: Luxembourg (Pétange) - Athus Container Terminal - France (Mont-Saint-Martin)
- N870: N88 - Halanzy - Rachecourt - Habergy - Arlon
- N872: Luxembourg (Rodange) - Athus
- N883: France (Mont-Saint-Martin) - Aubange - Messancy

The villages of Battincourt and Guerlange are only connected via municipal roads, not via the N-network.

There are 6 border crossings with Luxembourg and 5 with France:

- Rue Albert Claude from neighbouring Messancy to Clemency (LU)
- Rue de la Frontière from Guerlange to Clemency (LU)
- N88 Athus - Pétange (LU)
- N872 Athus - Rodange (LU)
- N830/E44 Athus - Pétange (LU)
- N804 Aubange - Rodange (LU)
- N830/E44 Athus - Mont-Saint-Martin (FR)
- A28/E411 Athus - Mont-Saint-Martin (FR)
- N883 Aubange - Mont-Saint-Martin (FR)
- Rue de l'Ermitage Halanzy - Mont-Saint-Martin (FR)

Aubange is served by the Walloon transport authority TEC with following bus lines:

- 16: Virton - Halanzy - Aubange - Athus - Arlon
- 20: Châtillon - Rachecourt - Arlon
- 21: Battincourt - Aix-sur-Cloie - Aubange - Athus - Arlon
- 83: Virton - Halanzy - Aubange - Luxembourg (LU)
- 161: Virton - Halanzy - Aubange - Athus - Arlon
- 169: Saint-Mard - Halanzy - Aubange - Athus
- 201: Châtillon - Rachecourt - Arlon
- 211: Battincourt - Aix-sur-Cloie - Aubange - Athus - Differt - Stockem
- 212: Rodange (LU) - Athus - Arlon
- 711: Virton - Mussy-la-Ville - Halanzy - Aubange - Athus
- 721: Musson - Rachecourt - Halanzy - Aubange - Athus - Differt
- 722: Bascharage (LU) - Athus - Aubange - Differt
- 731: Saint-Léger - Aubange - Athus
- 741: Arlon - Hondelange - Athus
- 751: Athus - Aubange - Longwy (FR)
- 761: Athus - Guerlange

Besides the Belgian service, Aubange is also served by Luxembourgisch bus service with one line:

- 703: Luxembourg - Pétange - Aubange - Athus - Mont-Saint-Martin (FR)

There are three railway stations in the municipality: in Athus, in Aubange and in Halanzy. The municipality is crossed by railway lines 165 and 167 and is connected by local train service to the provincial capital Arlon and to neighbouring Luxembourg. The municipality has the following train services:

- L-165: Libramont - Bertrix - Virton - Halanzy - Aubange - Athus - Arlon
- L-165: Athus - Rodange (LU) - Luxembourg (LU)

The closest airport to Aubange is Luxembourg Airport, located 38km northeast.

== See also ==
- List of protected heritage sites in Aubange
