= Battincourt =

Battincourt Bettenuwen/Bätem (Luxembourgish)
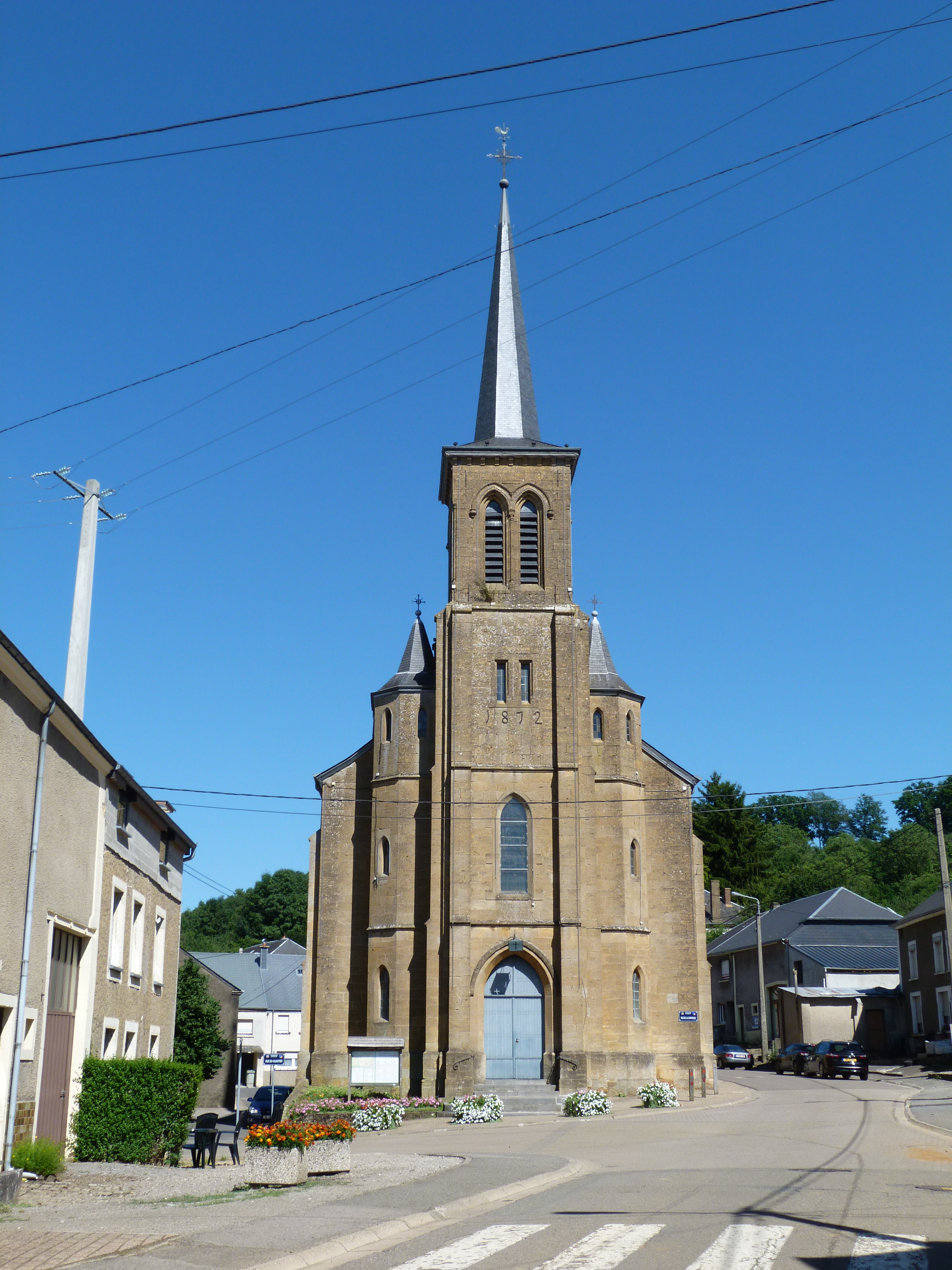
- Battincourt, village church

- Location within Belgium Location within Europe
- Coordinates: 49°34′51″N 05°45′39″E
- Country: Belgium
- Region: Wallonia
- Province: Luxembourg
- Municipality: Aubange

Battincourt (French pronunciation: [batɛ̃kuʁ]; Luxembourgish: Bettenuwen/Bätem) is a village of Wallonia in the municipality of Aubange, district of Halanzy, located in the province of Luxembourg, Belgium.

The village church dates from the 19th century and contains stained glass windows commemorating people from the village who died during World War I. It also contains two medieval sculptures.
