= List of protected heritage sites in Virton =

This table shows an overview of the protected heritage sites in the Walloon town Virton. This list is part of Belgium's national heritage.

| Object | Year/architect | Town/section | Address | Coordinates | Number^{?} | Image |
|---|---|---|---|---|---|---|
| St. Martin's Church and churchyard wall and the ensemble of the church, the old cemetery and the access road ^{(nl)} ^{(fr)} | | Virton | | 49.558871°N 5.529740°E | 85045-CLT-0002-01 Info | Kerk Saint-Martin en kerkhofmuur en het ensemble van de kerk, het oude kerkhof en de toegangsweg |
| Ensemble of "Chappelle Maron" and its immediate surroundings ^{(nl)} ^{(fr)} | | Virton | rue du Vieux-Virton | 49.561367°N 5.528252°E | 85045-CLT-0003-01 Info | |
| St. Martin's Church and the cemetery wall and the ensemble of the Church and its immediate surroundings ^{(nl)} ^{(fr)} | | Virton | | 49.557399°N 5.570131°E | 85045-CLT-0004-01 Info | |
| Polishing banks of Bruzel ^{(nl)} ^{(fr)} | | Virton | | 49.549744°N 5.539802°E | 85045-CLT-0005-01 Info | |
| Tower Castle: facades and roofs and the ensemble of the tower and its surroundings ^{(nl)} ^{(fr)} | | Virton | rue de l'Eglise | 49.540094°N 5.620053°E | 85045-CLT-0006-01 Info | |
| Chapel of Charnier ^{(nl)} ^{(fr)} | | Virton | | 49.554598°N 5.534819°E | 85045-CLT-0007-01 Info | |
| Presbytery: facades and roofs, surrounding wall and entrance portico ^{(nl)} ^{(fr)} | | Virton | rue de la Vilette n°1 | 49.554103°N 5.534213°E | 85045-CLT-0008-01 Info | |
| Tannery (facades and roofs) and hydraulic sawmill (facades, roofs, the whole mechanism of the rotor) and the ensemble of these buildings and their surroundings ^{(nl)} ^{(fr)} | | Virton | | 49.564998°N 5.533670°E | 85045-CLT-0009-01 Info | |
| Simonet House: facade, roof and ammunition magazine included in these parts. adoption of conservation ^{(nl)} ^{(fr)} | | Virton | avenue Bouvier n°2 | 49.567171°N 5.530839°E | 85045-CLT-0010-01 Info | |
| Fountain "Martin", including 6 meters of protection zone around the monument. ^{(nl)} ^{(fr)} | | Virton | rue Fontaine Martin | 49.562473°N 5.520259°E | 85045-CLT-0011-01 Info | |
| Totality of the kiosk and the grid square around the planted square ^{(nl)} ^{(fr)} | | Virton | | 49.555247°N 5.531294°E | 85045-CLT-0012-01 Info | |
| Music Kiosk, establishment of conservation ^{(nl)} ^{(fr)} | | Virton | place Georges Lorand | 49.568679°N 5.532564°E | 85045-CLT-0013-01 Info | |
| Some parts of building called "La Grande Maison" ^{(nl)} ^{(fr)} | | Virton | rue Sainte-Catherine n°2 | 49.567854°N 5.532044°E | 85045-CLT-0014-01 Info | |

== See also ==
- List of protected heritage sites in Luxembourg (Belgium)
- Virton
