= Saint-Mard, Belgium =

Saint-Mard Sié-Mâ (Gaumais)
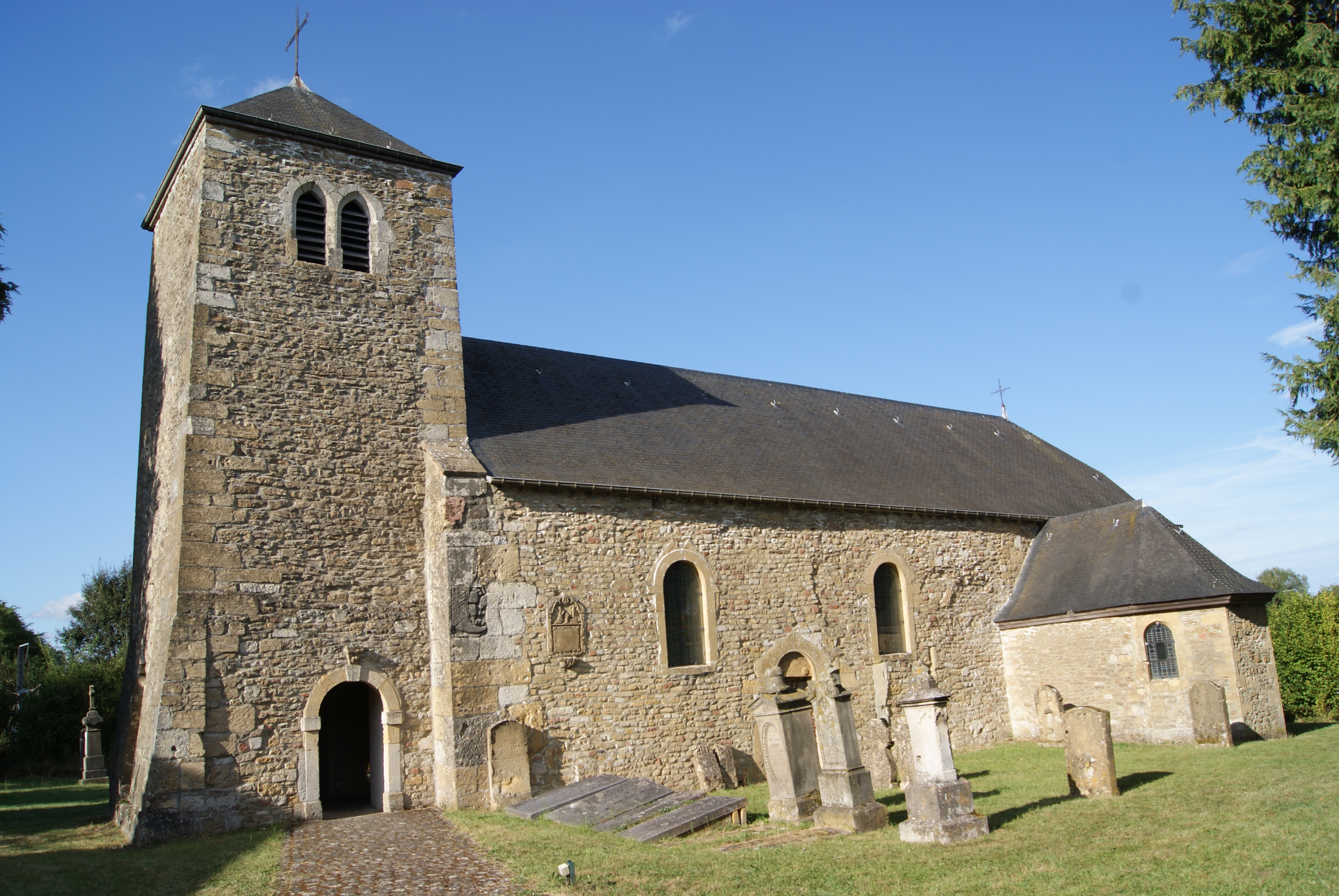
- Saint-Mard, church of Vieux-Virton

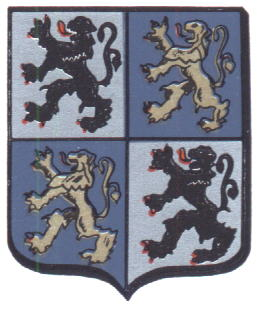
- Coat of arms

- Location within Belgium Location within Europe
- Coordinates: 49°33′03″N 05°31′08″E
- Country: Belgium
- Region: Wallonia
- Province: Luxembourg
- Municipality: Virton

Saint-Mard (Gaumais: Sié-Mâ; Walloon: Sint-Må-dlé-Vierton) is a village of Wallonia and a district of the municipality of Virton, located in the province of Luxembourg, Belgium.

A Roman settlement was established here in the first century AD. During the Middle Ages, the village belonged the County of Luxemburg. The centre of the village contains the Neo-Romanesque village church, built between 1864 and 1867. In the outskirts of the village, in the direction of Virton, lies the Church of Vieux-Virton, which traces its origins to the late 7th or early 8th century, though the oldest parts of the present building are from the 13th century.

== People ==
- Camille Barthélemy (1890–1961), Belgian painter, born in Saint-Mard
