= Rachecourt =

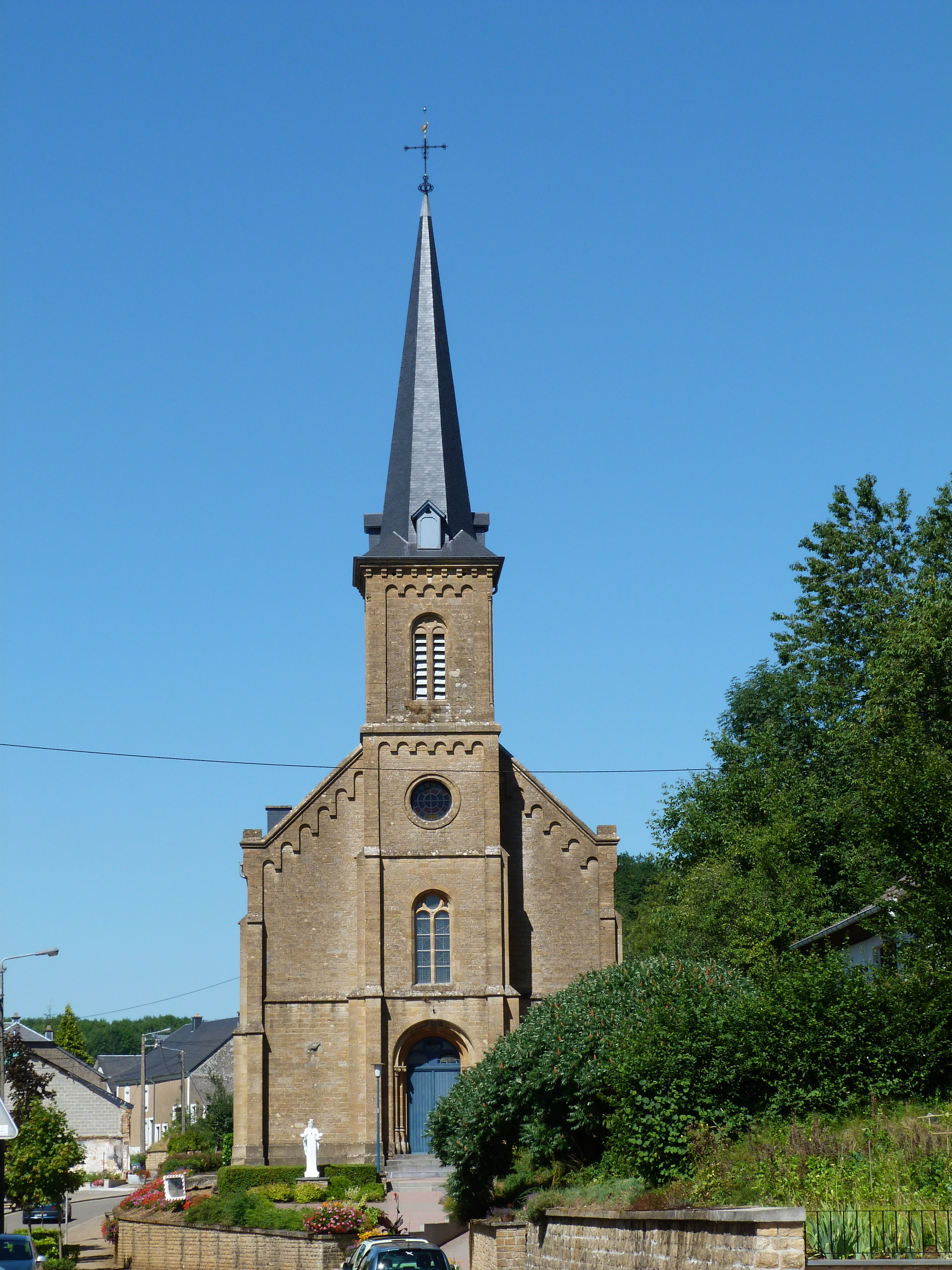
- Rachecourt, village church

- Location within Belgium Location within Europe
- Coordinates: 49°35′31″N 05°43′31″E
- Country: Belgium
- Region: Wallonia
- Province: Luxembourg
- Municipality: Aubange

Rachecourt (French pronunciation: [ʁaʃkuʁ]; Gaumais: Ratchcou; German: Ressig [ˈʁɛsɪç]; Luxembourgish: Réissech; Dutch: Roesig; Walloon: Ratchcoû) is a village of Wallonia and a district of the municipality of Aubange, located in the province of Luxembourg, Belgium.

The village church dates from 1905 and is built in a Romanesque Revival style. The village contains an apple orchard for preserving traditional apple varieties, and an apple festival is held annually in Rachecourt in October.
