= List of protected heritage sites in Aubange =

This table shows an overview of the protected heritage sites in the Walloon town Aubange. This list is part of Belgium's national heritage.

Object	Year/architect	Town/section	Address	Coordinates	Number^{?}	Image
Castle Noedelange ^{(nl)} ^{(fr)}		Aubange	Guerlange	49.585369°N 5.845952°E	81004-CLT-0001-01 Info	
Cross of Justice ^{(nl)} ^{(fr)}		Aubange	Halanzy	49.559412°N 5.743147°E	81004-CLT-0003-01 Info	
Stations of the Cross ^{(nl)} ^{(fr)}		Aubange		49.569303°N 5.806553°E	81004-CLT-0004-01 Info	
Stations of the Cross ^{(nl)} ^{(fr)}		Aubange	rue Arend, Aubange	49.566511°N 5.833509°E	81004-CLT-0005-01 Info	
Stations of the Cross ^{(nl)} ^{(fr)}		Aubange		49.564584°N 5.835409°E	81004-CLT-0006-01 Info	
Stations of the Cross ^{(nl)} ^{(fr)}		Aubange	Athus	49.565155°N 5.835756°E	81004-CLT-0007-01 Info	
Stations of the Cross ^{(nl)} ^{(fr)}		Aubange	rue de Messancy, bij nr 12, Aubange	49.571394°N 5.803717°E	81004-CLT-0009-01 Info	
Stations of the Cross ^{(nl)} ^{(fr)}		Aubange	rue du Monument 19, Aubange	49.581117°N 5.759831°E	81004-CLT-0010-01 Info	
Stations of the Cross ^{(nl)} ^{(fr)}		Aubange	rue de la Marne, Rachecourt	49.589771°N 5.726467°E	81004-CLT-0011-01 Info	
Stations of the Cross ^{(nl)} ^{(fr)}		Aubange		49.583010°N 5.857704°E	81004-CLT-0012-01 Info	Calvarie bij uitgang dorp Guerlange
Stations of the Cross ^{(nl)} ^{(fr)}		Aubange	Guerlange	49.583190°N 5.853024°E	81004-CLT-0013-01 Info	Calvarie in de hoek van de wegen rue du Calvaire en rue de Noedelange
Stations of the Cross ^{(nl)} ^{(fr)}		Aubange		49.583418°N 5.732319°E	81004-CLT-0014-01 Info	Calvarie tussen Rachecourt en Halanzy
Stations of the Cross ^{(nl)} ^{(fr)}		Aubange	rue Claie, à Aix-sur-Cloie	49.576577°N 5.780598°E	81004-CLT-0015-01 Info	Calvarie ingebouwd in de voorkant van de schuur van n°57
Stations of the Cross ^{(nl)} ^{(fr)}		Aubange	Aix-sur-Cloie	49.579745°N 5.782115°E	81004-CLT-0016-01 Info	Calvarie gesitueerd ter plaatse genaamd "Drinck"
Stations of the Cross ^{(nl)} ^{(fr)}		Aubange	Aix-sur-Cloie	49.577041°N 5.782073°E	81004-CLT-0017-01 Info	Calvarie in de voorkant van de schoolmuur
Stations of the Cross ^{(nl)} ^{(fr)}		Aubange	Aix-sur-Cloie	49.573819°N 5.779874°E	81004-CLT-0018-01 Info	
Clémarais farm ^{(nl)} ^{(fr)}		Aubange	Aubange	49.573288°N 5.797520°E	81004-CLT-0019-01 Info	Domein van Clémarais
Stations of the Cross and sacristy with surrounding wall in Guerlange graveyard ^{(nl)} ^{(fr)}		Aubange		49.582045°N 5.854794°E	81004-CLT-0020-01 Info	De sacristie, twee calvaries en omringende muur van Guerlange, en het ensemble van de begraafplaats van Guerlange

== See also ==
- List of protected heritage sites in Luxembourg (Belgium)
- Aubange
