= Arrondissement of Virton =

Arrondissement in Wallonia, Belgium

Arrondissement of Virton Arrondissement de Virton
- Arrondissement
- Location of the arrondissement in Luxembourg
- Coordinates: 49.65°N 5.5°E
- Country: Belgium
- Region: Wallonia
- Province: Luxembourg
- Municipalities: 10

Area
  - Total: 771.19 km^{2} (297.76 sq mi)

Population (1 January 2017)
  - Total: 53,500
  - Density: 69.4/km^{2} (180/sq mi)
- Time zone: UTC+1 (CET)
  - Summer (DST): UTC+2 (CEST)

The Arrondissement of Virton (French: Arrondissement de Virton; Dutch: Arrondissement Virton) is one of the five administrative arrondissements in the Walloon province of Luxembourg, Belgium.

The Administrative Arrondissement of Virton consists of the following municipalities:

- Chiny
- Étalle
- Florenville
- Habay
- Meix-devant-Virton
- Musson
- Rouvroy
- Saint-Léger
- Tintigny
- Virton
