= Saint-Léger, Belgium =

Municipality in Wallonia, Belgium

Saint-Léger Sint-Ldjir-e-Gåme (Walloon)
- Municipality
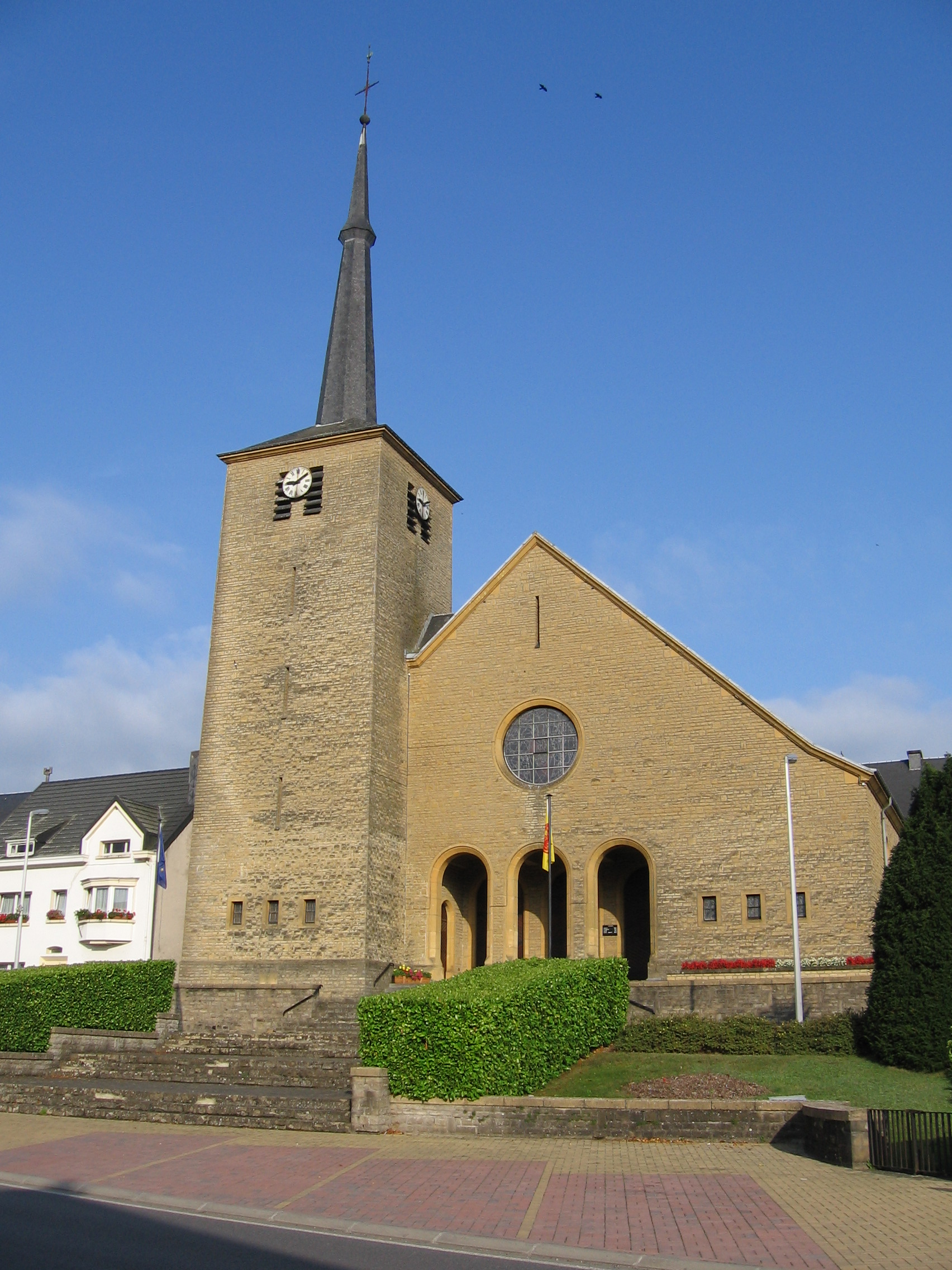
- The church

- Flag Coat of arms

- Location of Saint-Léger in Luxembourg province
- Interactive map of Saint-Léger
- Location in Belgium
- Coordinates: 49°37′N 05°39′E
- Country: Belgium
- Community: French Community
- Region: Wallonia
- Province: Luxembourg
- Arrondissement: Virton

Government
  - Mayor: Alain Rongvaux (Avenir)
  - Governing party: Avenir

Area
  - Total: 36.25 km^{2} (14.00 sq mi)

Population (2018-01-01)
  - Total: 3,592
  - Density: 99.09/km^{2} (256.6/sq mi)
- Postal codes: 6747
- NIS code: 85034
- Area codes: 063
- Website: (in French) saint-leger.be

Saint-Léger (French pronunciation: [sɛ̃ leʒe]; also unofficial Saint-Léger-en-Gaume; Walloon: Sint-Ldjir-e-Gåme) is a municipality of Wallonia located in the province of Luxembourg, Belgium.

On 1 January 2022 the municipality, which covers 35.86 km^{2}, had 3,735 inhabitants, giving a population density of 104.0 inhabitants per km^{2}.

The municipality consists of the districts of Châtillon, Meix-le-Tige, and Saint-Léger. There is a Spar supermarket near the town center.

== Transport ==
Saint-Léger is not served by any highways. The closes highway entrance is exit 31 of the E25/E411 highway (Brussels/Liège - Luxembourg) in neighbouring Arlon. There is one major national road that passes Saint-Léger from southwest to northeast. This is the N82 from Virton to the provincial capital Arlon. All N-roads are maintained by the Walloon government. The following roads cross the municipality:

- N82: Virton - Saint-Léger - Châtillon - Arlon
- N813: Aubange - Meix-le-Teige - Châtillon - Étalle

Saint-Léger is served by the Walloon transport authority TEC with following bus lines:

- 19/191: Virton - Saint-Léger - Châtillon - Arlon
- 199: Saint-Mard - Virton - Saint-Léger - Châtillon - Arlon
- 20/201: Châtillon - Meix-le-Teige - Rachecourt - Arlon
- 391: Saint-Léger - Ruette - Virton
- 731: Saint-Léger - Châtillon - Meix-le-Teige - Athus

There are no railway lines passing Saint-Léger. The closest train station is in Virton, 11.5 km to the southwest. The closest airport with commercial service is Luxembourg Airport 40.5 km east.
