= Lists of municipalities of Belgium =

The list of municipalities of Belgium is a survey of the following lists because Belgium is divided in three regions:

- Brussels-Capital Region or Brussels, see List of municipalities of the Brussels-Capital Region (19 municipalities)
- Flemish Region or Flanders, see List of municipalities of the Flemish Region (285 municipalities)
- Walloon Region or Wallonia, see List of municipalities in Wallonia (261 municipalities)

== See also ==
- Municipalities of Belgium
