= Arrondissement of Neufchâteau, Belgium =

Arrondissement in Wallonia, Belgium

Arrondissement of Neufchâteau Arrondissement de Neufchâteau
- Arrondissement
- Location of the arrondissement in Luxembourg
- Coordinates: 49.9°N 5.35°E
- Country: Belgium
- Region: Wallonia
- Province: Luxembourg
- Municipalities: 12

Area
  - Total: 1,354.57 km^{2} (523.00 sq mi)

Population (1 January 2017)
  - Total: 62,777
  - Density: 46.345/km^{2} (120.03/sq mi)
- Time zone: UTC+1 (CET)
  - Summer (DST): UTC+2 (CEST)

The Arrondissement of Neufchâteau (French: Arrondissement de Neufchâteau; Dutch: Arrondissement Neufchâteau) is one of the five administrative arrondissements in the Walloon province of Luxembourg, Belgium. It is both an administrative and a judicial arrondissement. However, the Judicial Arrondissement of Neufchâteau also comprises the municipalities of Bastogne, Bertogne, Fauvillers, Sainte-Ode and Vaux-sur-Sûre in the Arrondissement of Bastogne.

== Municipalities ==
The Administrative Arrondissement of Neufchâteau consists of the following municipalities:

- Bertrix
- Bouillon
- Daverdisse
- Herbeumont
- Léglise
- Libin
- Libramont-Chevigny
- Neufchâteau
- Paliseul
- Saint-Hubert
- Tellin
- Wellin
