= Athus =

Town in Luxembourg Province, Wallonia, Belgium

Athus Attem (Luxembourgish)
- Part of Aubange city
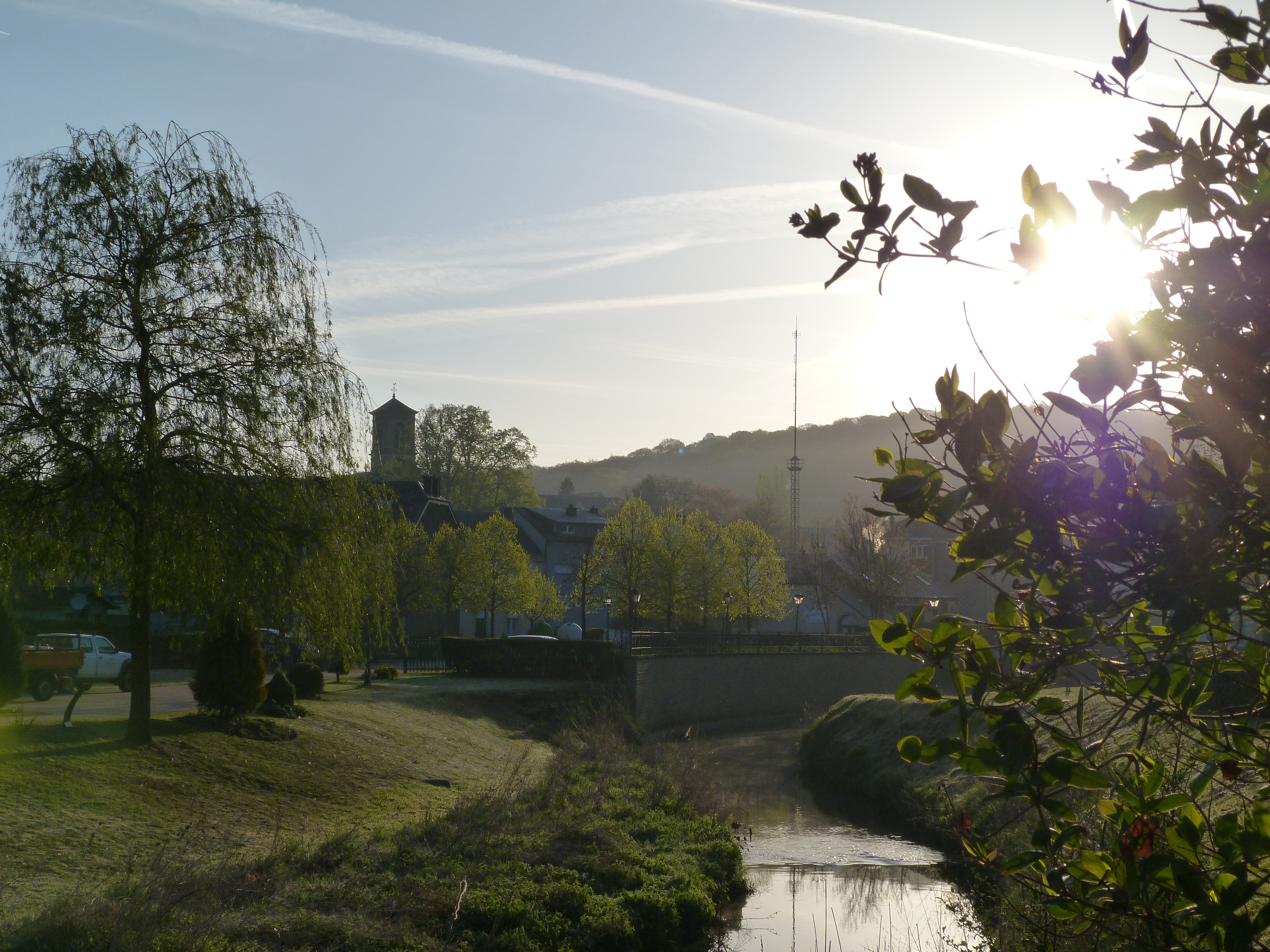

- Seal

- Location in Belgium
- Coordinates: 49°33′48″N 005°50′00″E
- Country: Belgium
- Region: Wallonia
- Province: Luxembourg
- Municipality: Aubange
- Elevation: 920 ft (280 m)

Population
  - Total: 7,227
- Time zone: UTC+1
- Postal code: 6791

Athus (German: Athem, Luxembourgish: Attem, Walloon: Atu) is a part of Aubange city Wallonia and a district of the municipality of Aubange, located in the province of Luxembourg, Belgium.

It is located in the far south of the country, just near the borders with France and Luxembourg. It is a French speaking city, though the traditional language is Luxembourgish. The poet and novelist Hubert Juin (1926–1987) was born in Athus.

The city was famous during the 19th and 20th century because of its steelworks factory which closed in the 1970s.

== Geography ==
The town is surrounded by two boundaries: the one with France and the other one with Luxembourg. Athus lies at the confluence of the rivers Messancy and Chiers. Directly across the border with Luxembourg is the town of Rodange and the town of Pétange is 1.5 kilometres (0.93 mi) to the east. On the French side, the main neighbouring city is Longwy in Meurthe-et-Moselle, over 5 km to the south west.

Athus is situated at 200 kilometers from Brussels, 25 from Luxembourg City and 15 from Arlon.

== History ==
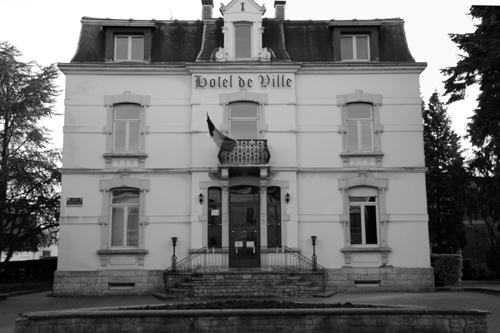
Hôtel de Ville of the municipality of Aubange, is situated in Athus

Athus has always been a Germanic place though its first origins are during the Roman period. It was a little village until the 17th century when the steelworks began to develop in the whole region. It was during the 19th century that Athus started to become relatively famous in the neighborhood and especially in 1872 when the first steel factory was founded. At the same time, in 1878, Athus also became an independent commune until the reorganization of the 1970s, when it was merged with the surrounding communes to create the enlarged municipality of Aubange on 1 January 1977. But 1977 was a tragic year for the city because the factory closed its doors due to the iron and steel crisis of that moment. At that time, the city was at the top of its fame and of its number of inhabitants which reached approximately 7,500. That event led to a social and economic crisis for the city and the whole region which is not yet totally solved today. But Athus is still the biggest locality of the municipality of Aubange, and the most important because many services are still there; (the townhall, the main schools, the main bus lines stops and train station, the police station or the firehouse are examples.)

=== Steelworks ===
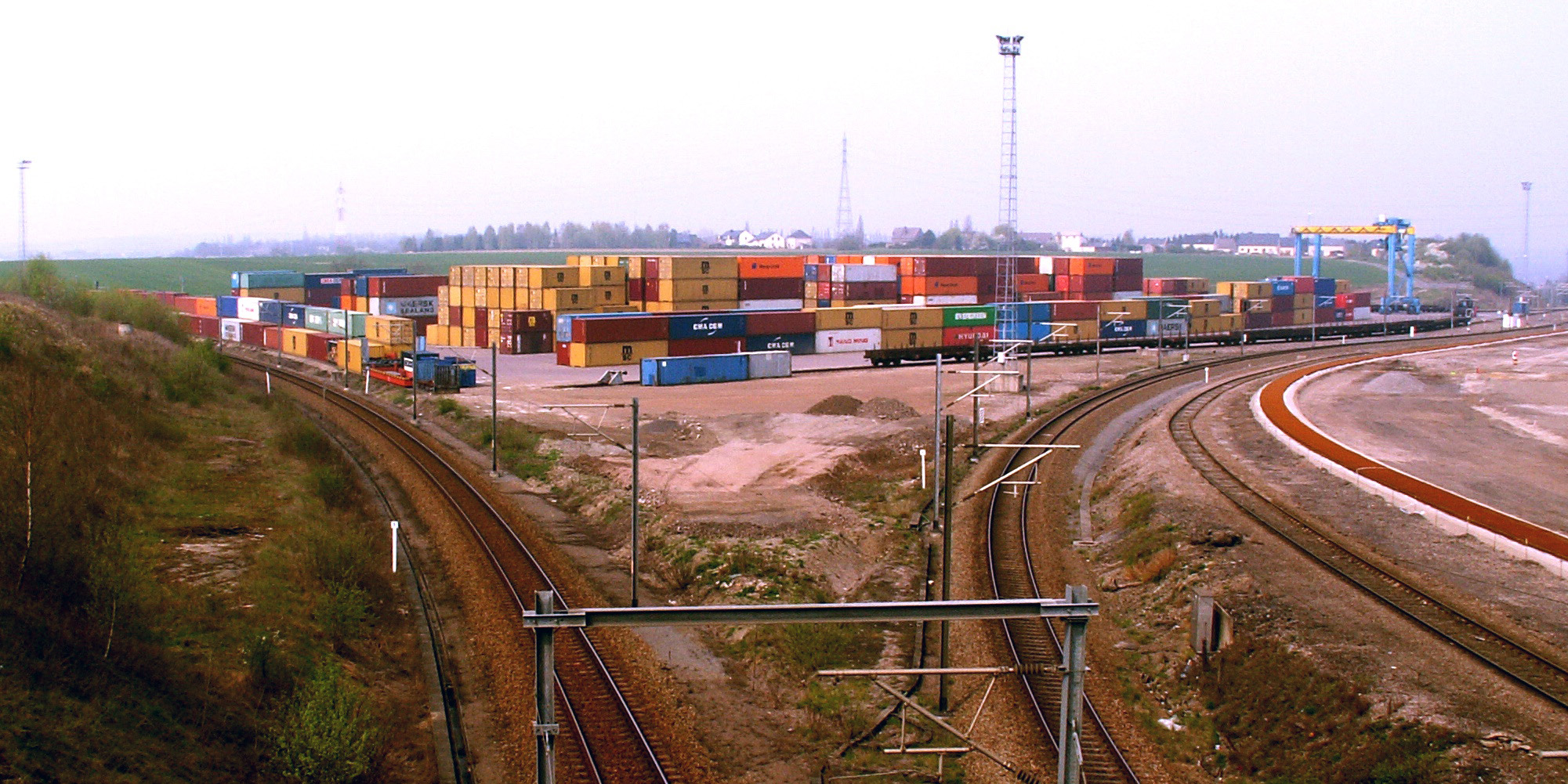
The container terminal of Athus, as seen from Road N830

The steelworks in Athus was founded in 1872 as the company Société des Hauts Fourneaux d'Athus, a blast furnace was constructed and in 1880 a steelworks. In 1882, the company became Société des Hauts Fourneaux et Aciéries d'Athus; by 1914 there were four blast furnaces, and by 1928 five. In 1927 merger with the S.A. des Aciéries d'Angleur et des Charbonnages belges de Tilleu formed S.A. d´Angleur-Athus. In 1945 the company was taken over by the Société anonyme John Cockerill. Production continued until the steel works at Athus was merged with the Minière et Métallurgique de Rodange (MMR) in 1973; restructuring as a result of the Steel crisis of the 1973–75 recession led to the complete closure of the plant in Athus in the late 1970s.

The site of the plant is now a rail-served container terminal which deals with containers from the ports of the North Sea to the interior of France, Luxembourg, Germany, Switzerland and Belgium.

== Demographics ==
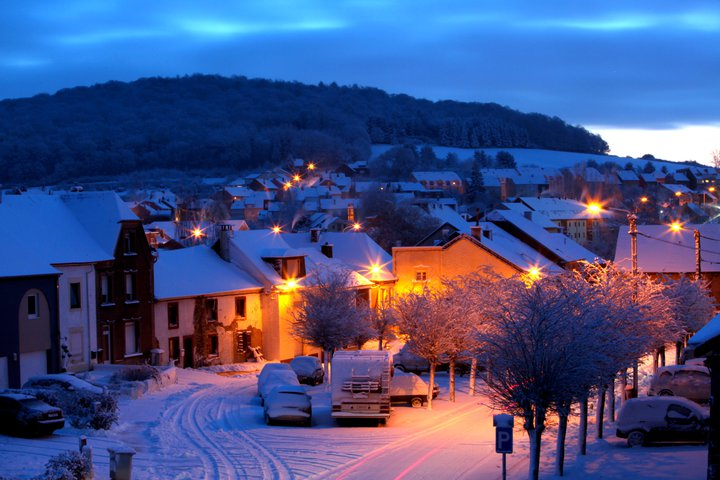
The Place verte (the green square), location of Athus's first religious monument, a chapel, built in the 16th century.

Athus had a population of 7227 inhabitants in January 2012.

== Transportation ==
Athus has a railway station, which connects it to other stations in the Belgian railway network and to those of Luxembourg and France. It is connected hourly to Luxembourg City and Esch-sur-Alzette for the Luxembourgish part, and also hourly to Arlon, Libramont and Virton on the Belgian routes. This railway route hosts cargo trains as well as passenger trains and has been operating for a number of years.

The city is situated just 10 kilometres south of European highway E 411/E42 between Luxembourg and Brussels.

== Culture ==
=== Museums ===
Athus has two museums:

- Athus et l'acier (Athus and Steel), which is about the history of the steelworks and the factory of the city.
- L'Univers des pompiers (fr) (The Fireman's World), which is about firemen.

== Religion ==
Athus is Catholic, though today there is a very limited number of people who go to church. The church is dedicated to Saint Stephen and was built in 1833.

== Pictures ==
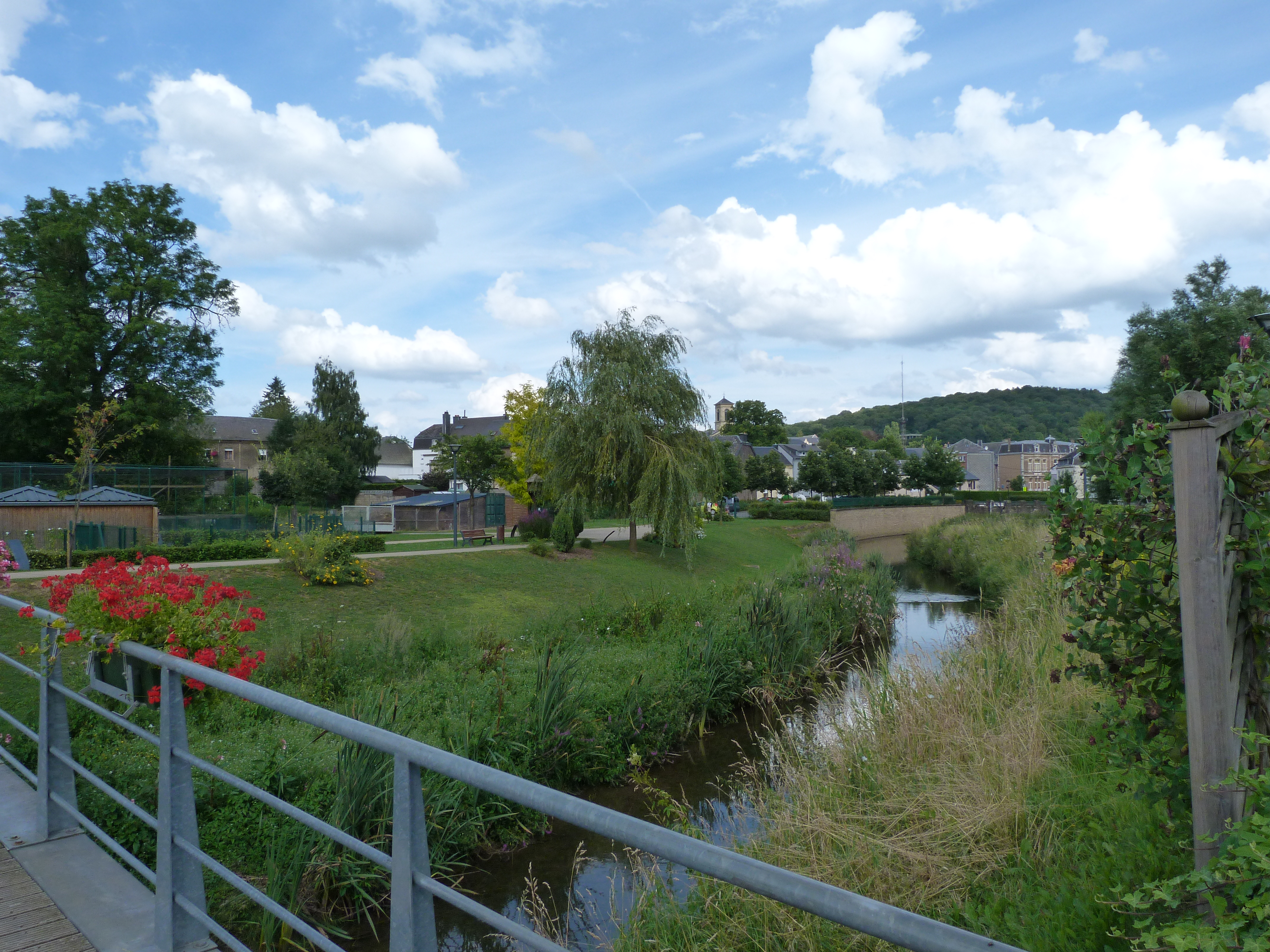
The park in the middle of the city with the Messancy river.

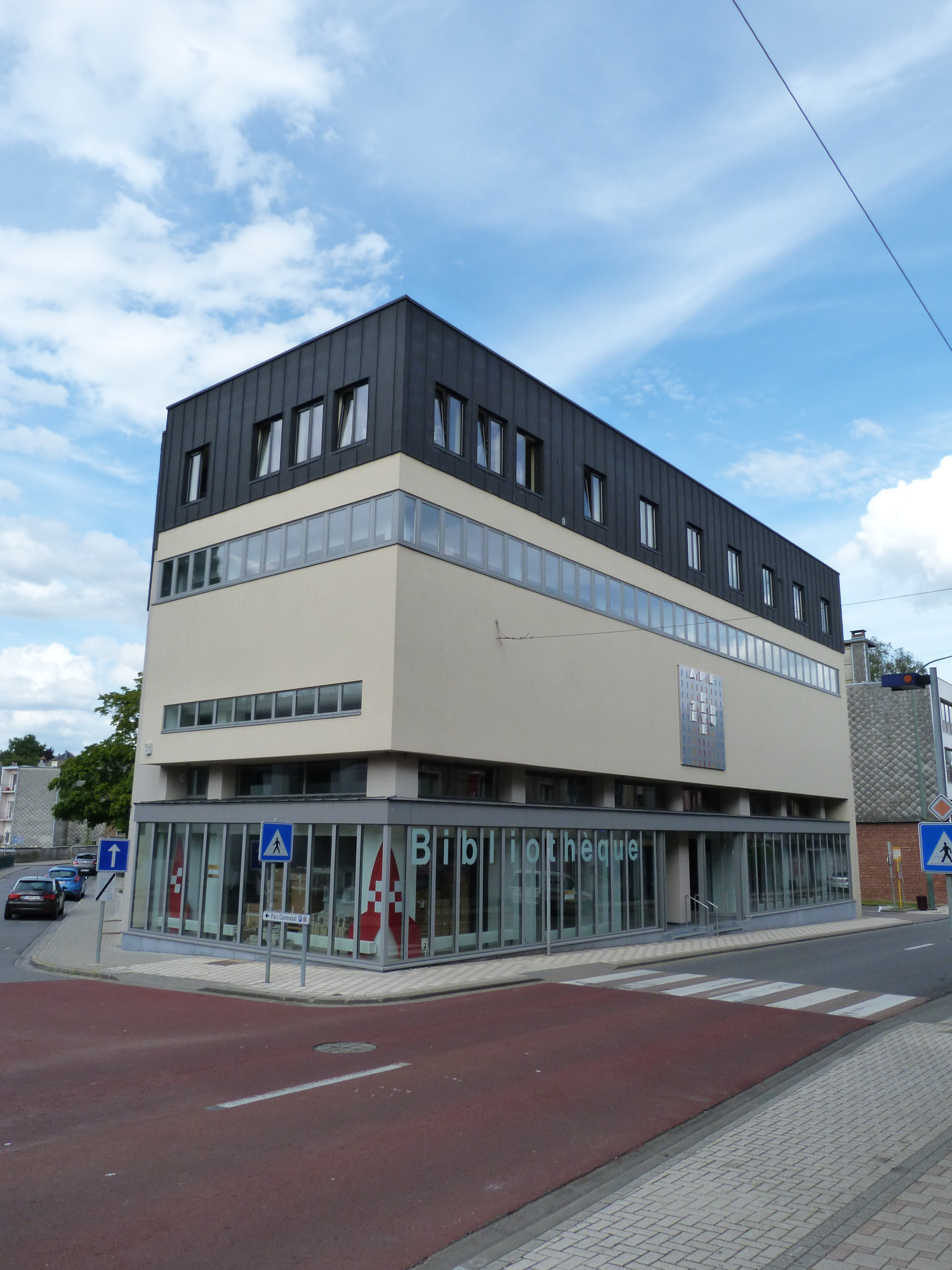
The new library in the main street.

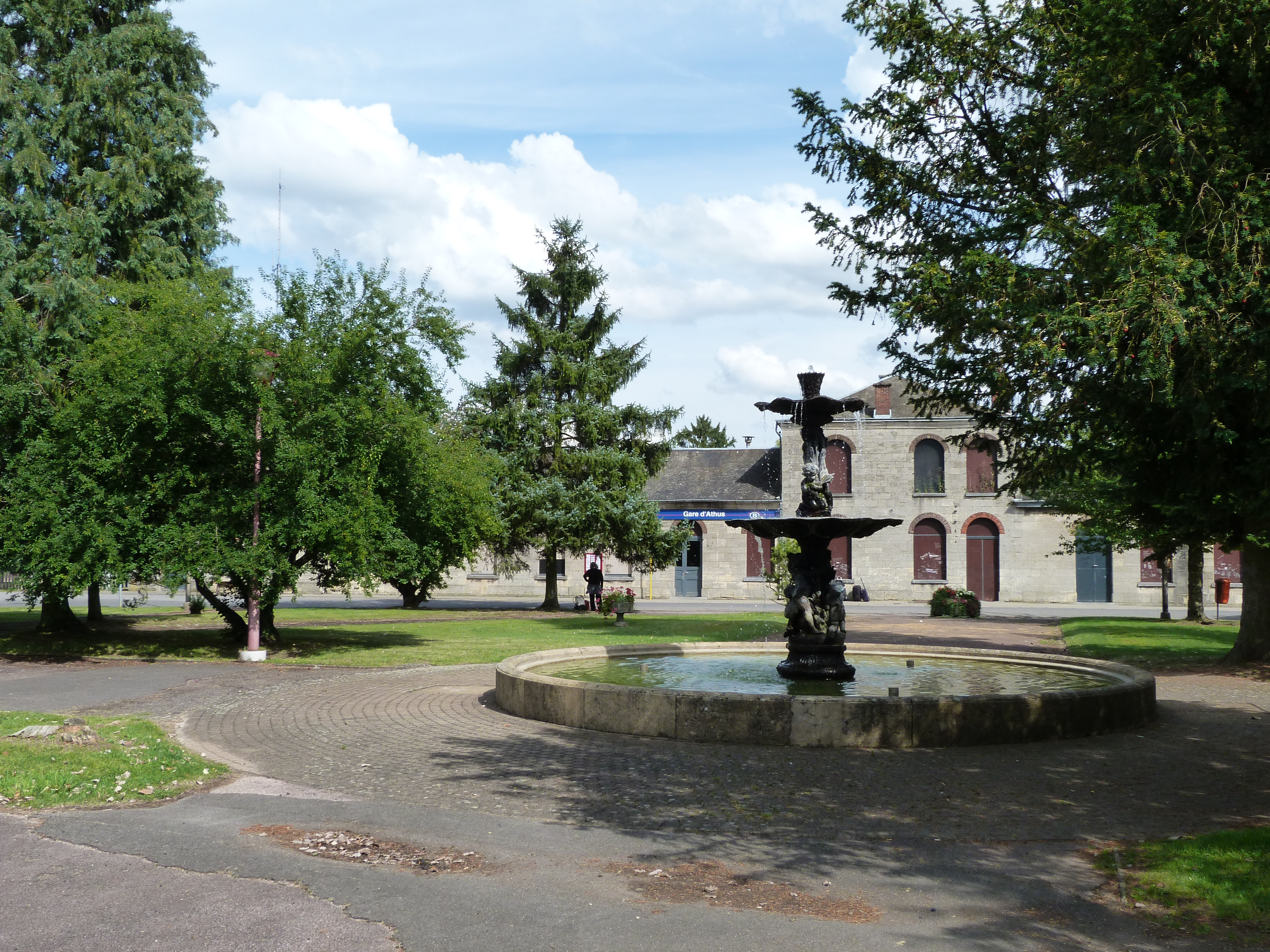
The railway station.

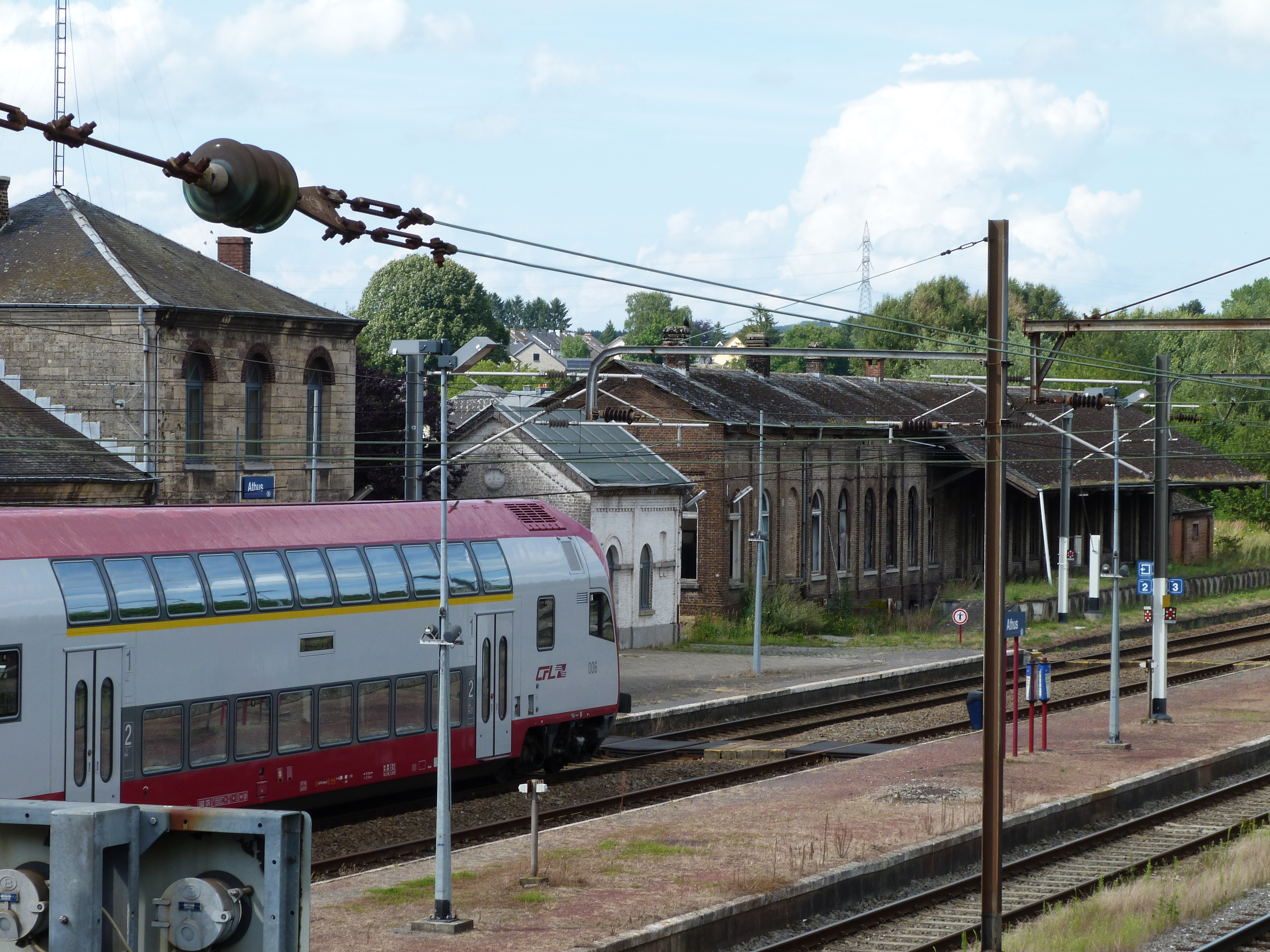
A Luxembourgish (CFL) train in Athus railway station

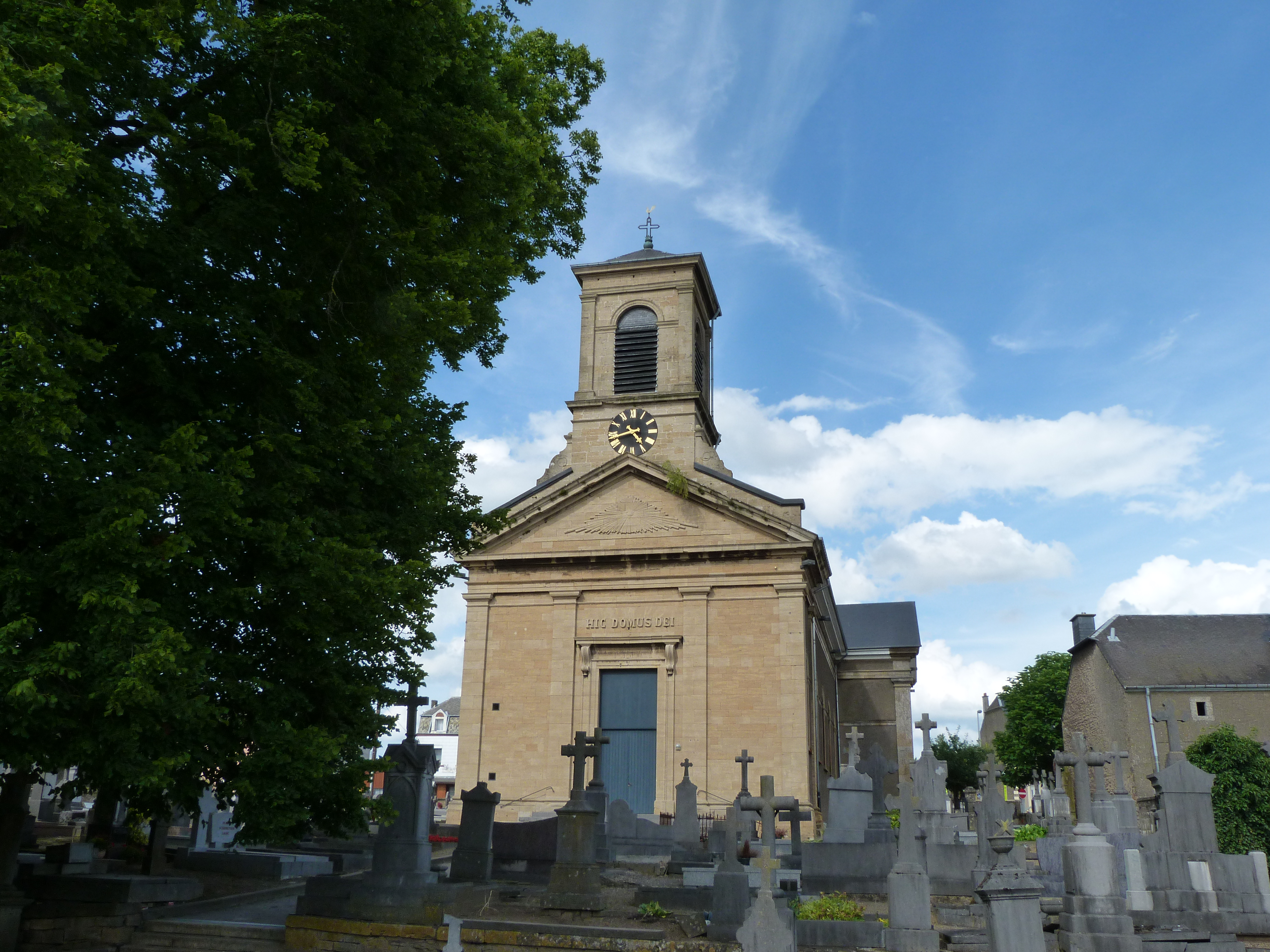
Saint-Etienne's church and old cemetery

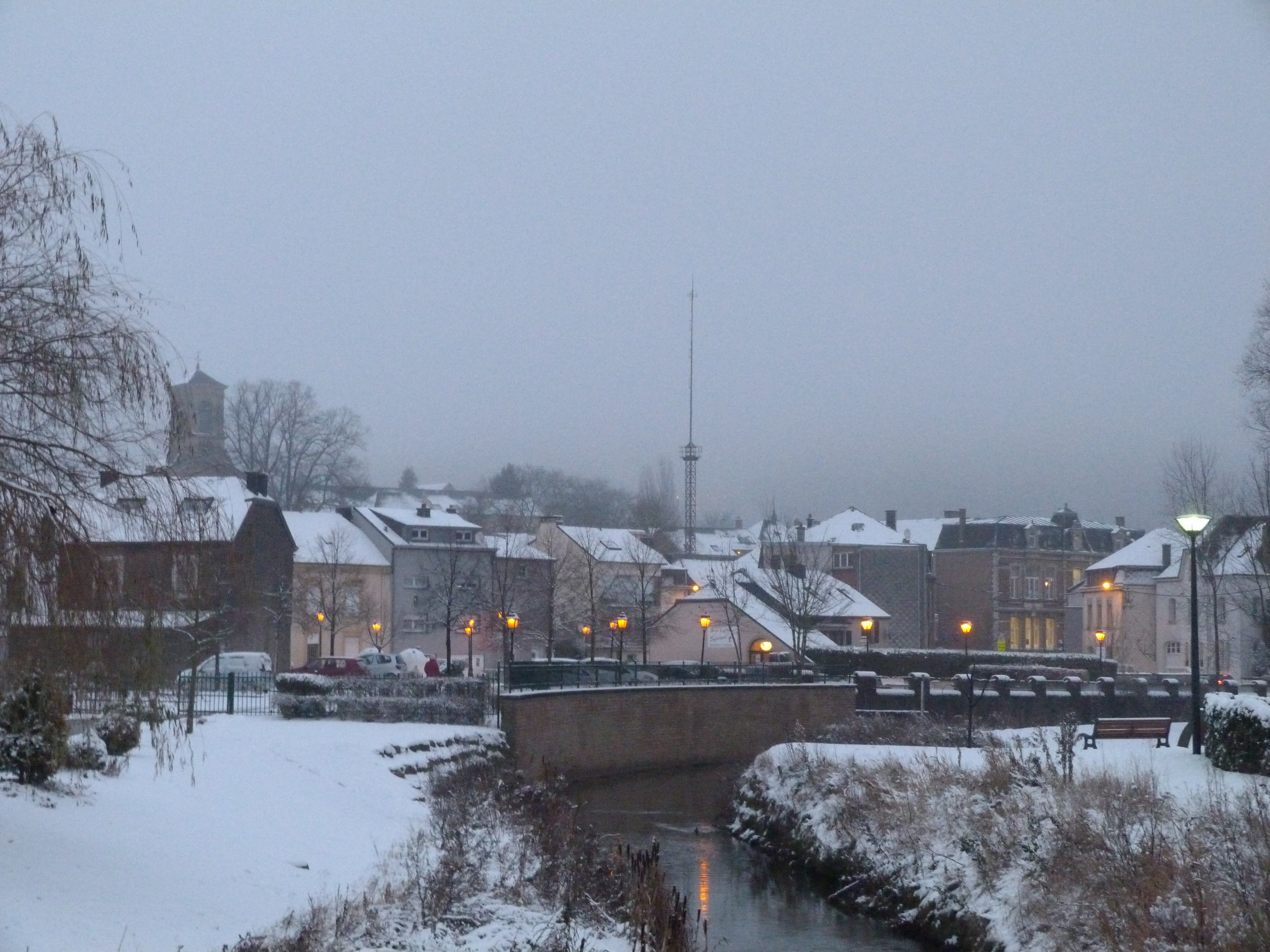
The park covered with snow.
