= Rodange =

Town in Luxembourg

Coordinates: 49°32′48″N 5°50′23″E

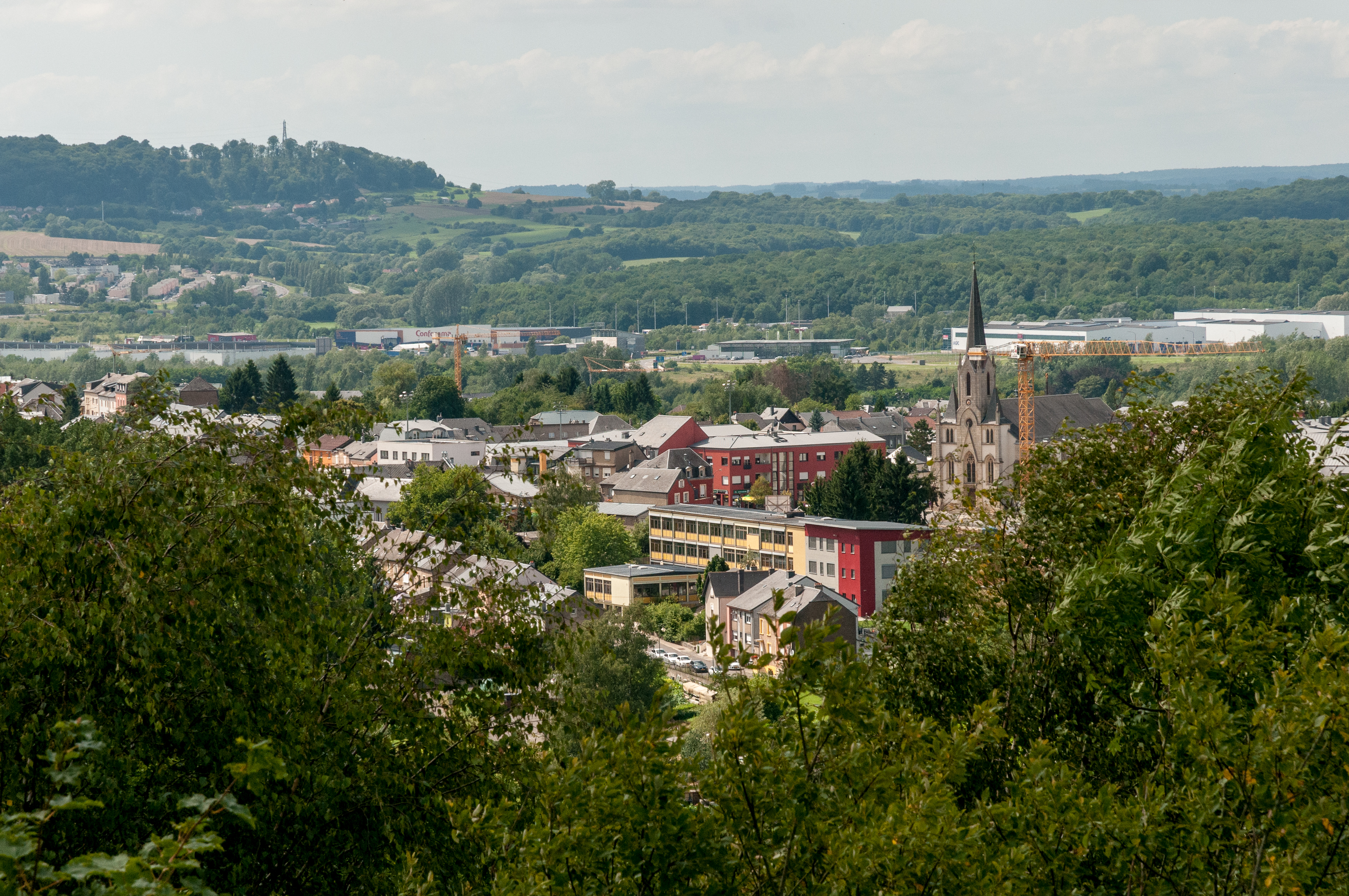
A view of Rodange from the Mirador de Lamadelaine

Rodange (French pronunciation: [ʁɔdɑ̃ʒ]; German: Rodingen) (Luxembourgish: Réiden op der Kor, Réidéng) is a town in the commune of Pétange, in south-western Luxembourg. It lies next to the border with Belgium, across which is the town of Athus. The town is to the south-west of the town of Pétange and to the west of the smaller town of Lamadelaine. As of September 2026, Rodange has a population of 7,945.

The town has a railway station served by CFL trains. Rodange is situated on Line 70, which connects the south-west of the country to Luxembourg City; at Rodange, the line branches, and connects to both Athus and the French town of Longuyon (via Longwy).

== Steel works ==
The steelworks in Rodange was founded in 1872. After numerous mergers and restructuring as of 2010 the plant now produces mainly long steel products, and is now part of the ArcelorMittal Rodange & Schifflange S.A, a division of ArcelorMittal.
