= Halanzy =

Halanzy Hueldang (Luxembourgish)
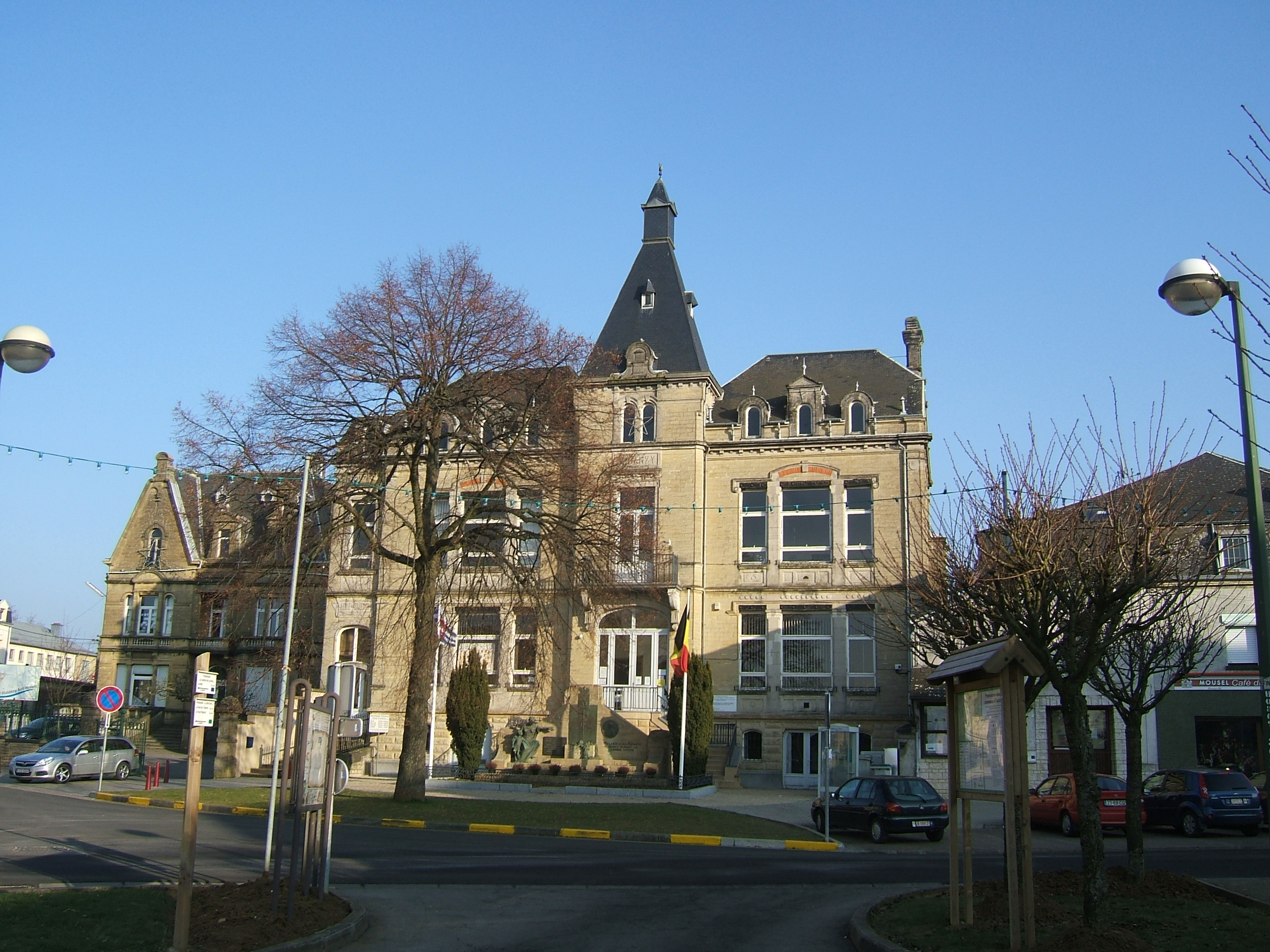
- Halanzy, former town hall

- Location within Belgium Location within Europe
- Coordinates: 49°33′35″N 05°44′35″E
- Country: Belgium
- Region: Wallonia
- Province: Luxembourg
- Municipality: Aubange

Halanzy (French pronunciation: [alɑ̃zi]; Gaumais: Halazi; Luxembourgish: Hueldang; German: Holdingen [ˈhɔldɪŋən]) is a village of Wallonia and a district of the municipality of Aubange, located in the province of Luxembourg, Belgium.

The history of Halanzy is connected to the mining of iron ore in the area. A memorial of its past as a mining town is the preserved early steam locomotive in the town centre. The village church dates from 1844, and there is also a chapel built in 1725 in gratitude for the village being spared from the cholera epidemic in 1720. Similarly, a calvary group in the village was erected to celebrate that the village was spared destruction during World War I.
