= Daverdisse =

Municipality in Wallonia, Belgium

Daverdisse Dåvdisse (Walloon)
- Municipality
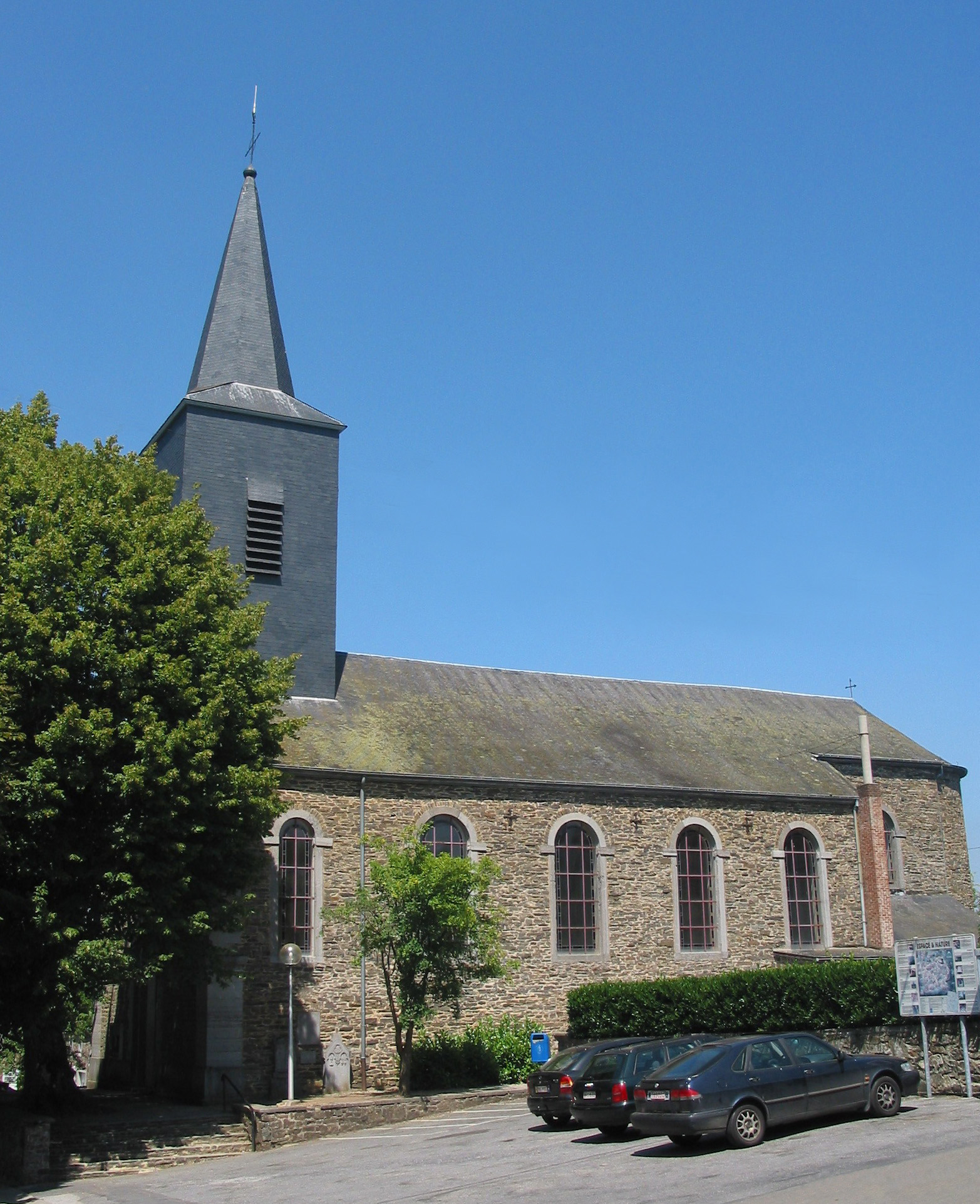

- Flag Coat of arms

- Location of Daverdisse in Luxembourg province
- Interactive map of Daverdisse
- Location in Belgium
- Coordinates: 50°01′N 05°07′E
- Country: Belgium
- Community: French Community
- Region: Wallonia
- Province: Luxembourg
- Arrondissement: Neufchâteau

Government
  - Mayor: Maxime Léonet
  - Governing party: POUR!

Area
  - Total: 56.87 km^{2} (21.96 sq mi)

Population (2018-01-01)
  - Total: 1,407
  - Density: 24.74/km^{2} (64.08/sq mi)
- Postal codes: 6929
- NIS code: 84016
- Area codes: 061
- Website: www.daverdisse.be

Daverdisse (French pronunciation: [davɛʁdis]; Walloon: Dåvdisse) is a municipality of Wallonia located in the province of Luxembourg, Belgium.

On 1 January 2007, the municipality, which covers 56.4 km^{2}, had 1,372 inhabitants, giving a population density of 24.3 inhabitants per km^{2}.

The municipality consists of the following districts: Daverdisse, Gembes, Haut-Fays, and Porcheresse.

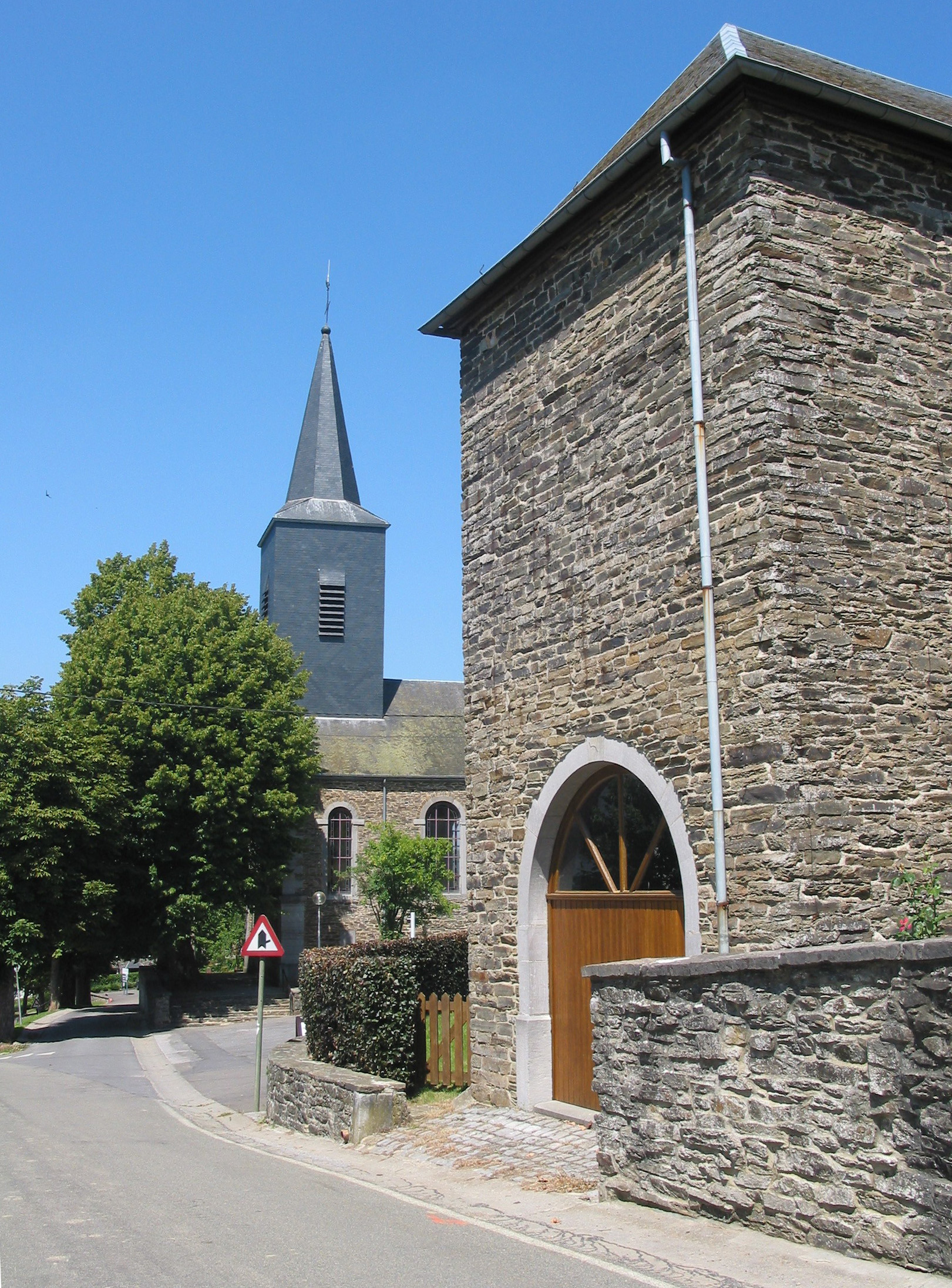
Near St Peter's Church

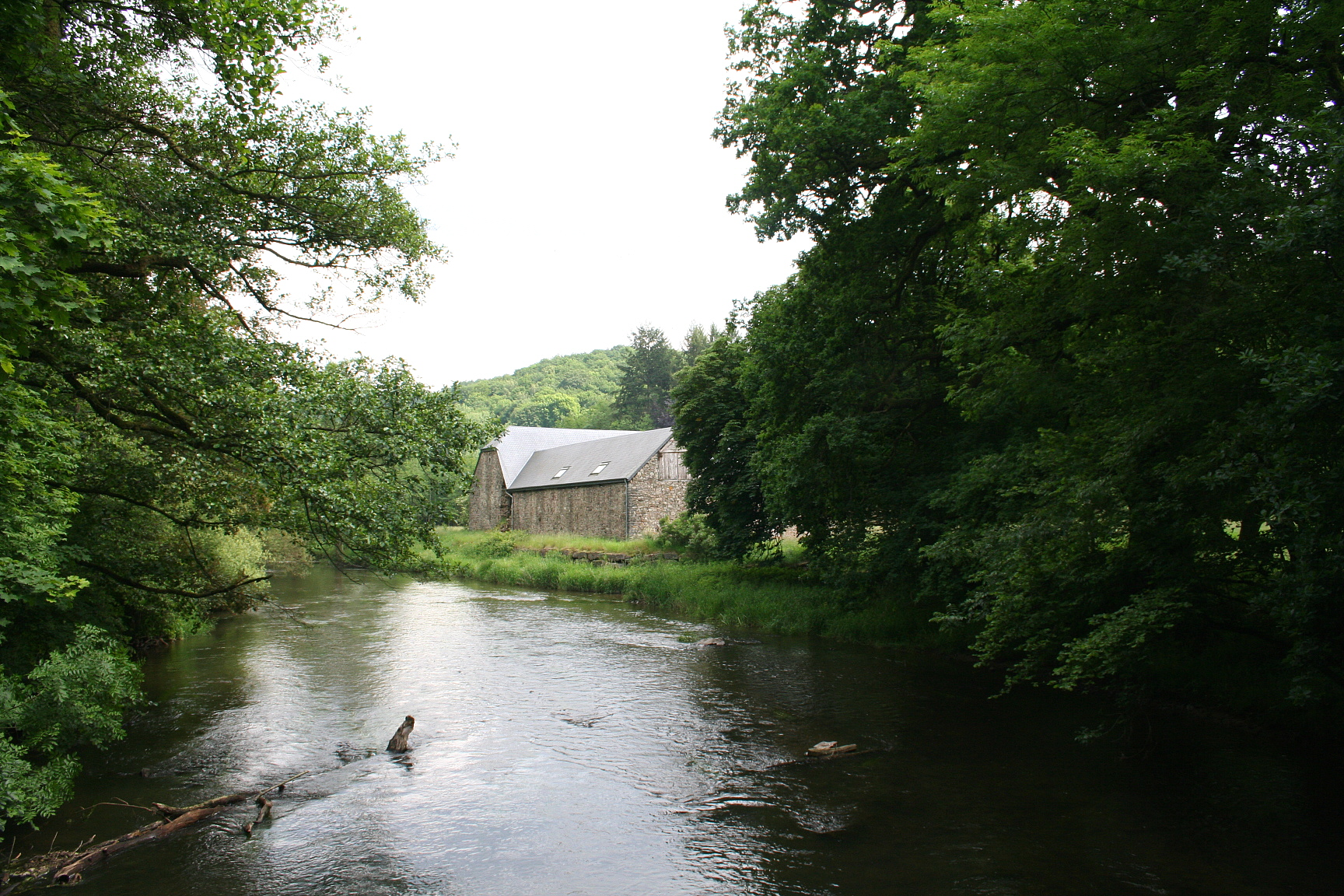
The Lesse river and the Mohimont Farm

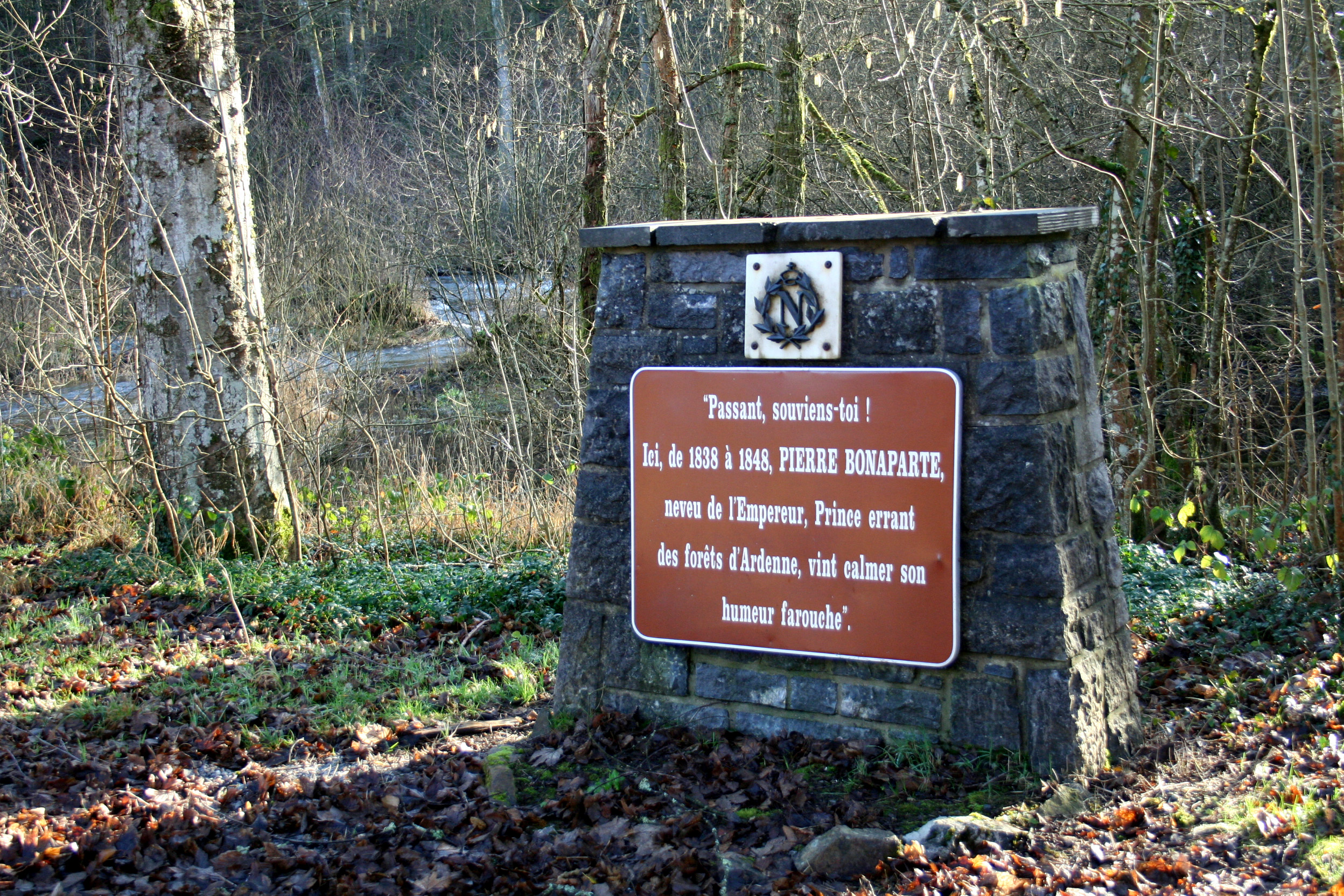
Memorial plate dedicated to prince Pierre Bonaparte
