= Virton =

City in Wallonia, Belgium

Virton Viertån (Gaumais)
- City and municipality
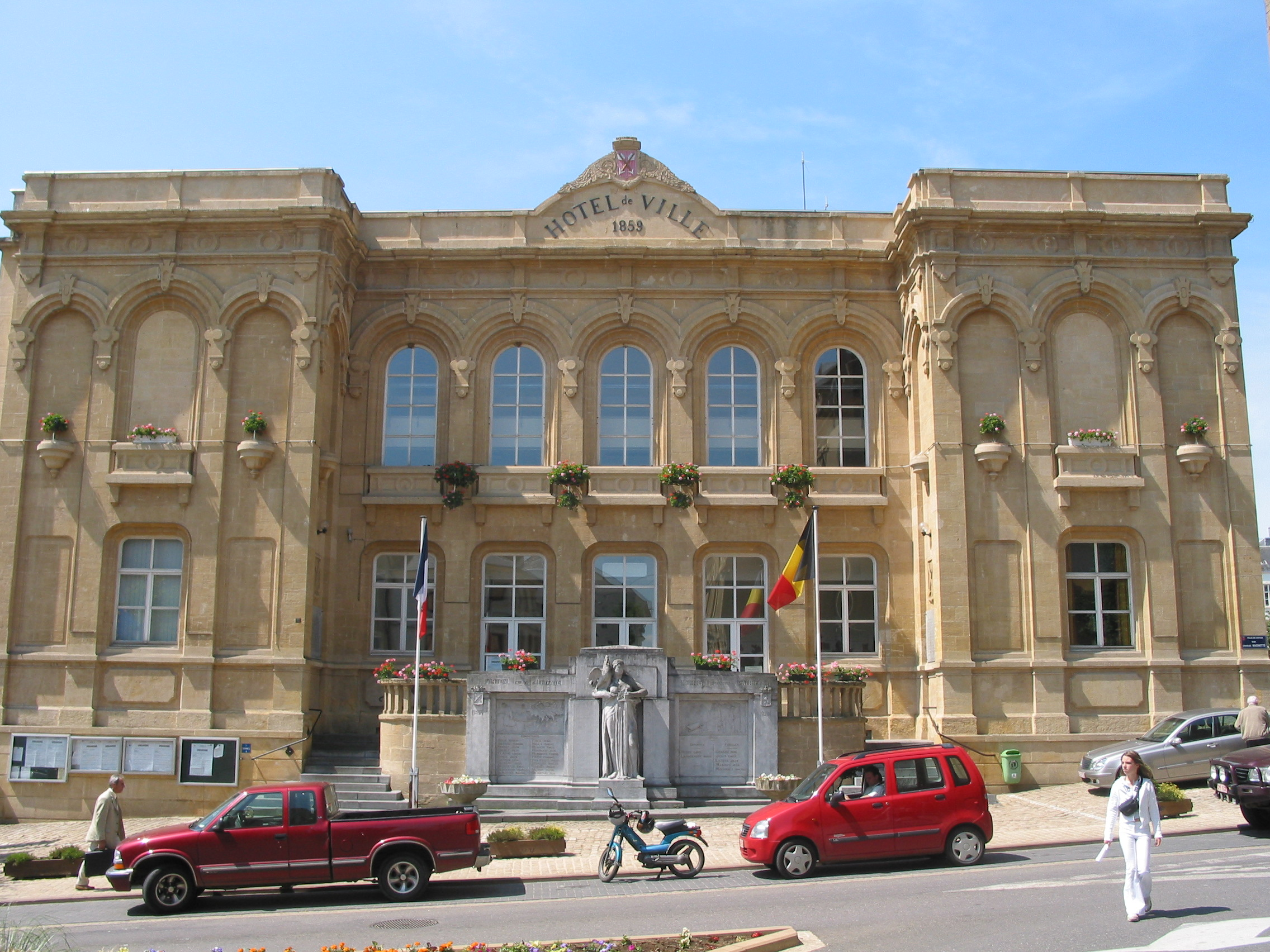
- The town hall

- Flag Coat of arms

- Location of Virton in Luxembourg province
- Interactive map of Virton
- Location in Belgium
- Coordinates: 49°34.05′N 05°31.95′E
- Country: Belgium
- Community: French Community
- Region: Wallonia
- Province: Luxembourg
- Arrondissement: Virton

Government
  - Mayor: François Culot (IC-MR)
  - Governing parties: IC-MR, Ecolo+, Ensemble Autrement

Area
  - Total: 95.63 km^{2} (36.92 sq mi)

Population (2018-01-01)
  - Total: 11,323
  - Density: 118.4/km^{2} (306.7/sq mi)
- Postal codes: 6760-6762
- NIS code: 85045
- Area codes: 063
- Website: (in French) virton.be

Virton (French pronunciation: [viʁ.tɔ̃]; Gaumais: Viertån; Walloon: Vierton) is a city and municipality of Wallonia located in the province of Luxembourg, Belgium. It is also the administrative centre of the district (arrondissement) of the same name, as well as the principal town of the small region of Belgian Lorraine known as the Gaume, famous for its microclimate.

The municipality consists of the following districts: Bleid, Ethe, Latour, Ruette, Saint-Mard, and Virton. Other population centers include: Chenois, Gomery, Grandcourt, and Saint-Remy.

== History ==
=== Antiquity and Middle Ages ===
Several archeological finds indicate that the area was already inhabited before the Romans built villas there and named the town Vertunum. In the early 5th century, the Romans had to flee the Germanic invasions. Their settlement was destroyed and rebuilt by the Franks somewhat north of its original site.

Virton was mentioned for the first time in Pope Lucius III's bull of 1183 as a fiefdom of the House of Chiny. As overlords of Virton, the Counts of Chiny could levy taxes (the tonlieu) on the various goods sold at the local market, which is attested as early as 1270. In 1441, the Duchy of Luxembourg was sold to Philip the Good, Duke of Burgundy. From that date, Virton, like many other Walloon cities, became embroiled in more than two centuries of wars between France, Spain, and the Netherlands, with all the fighting, famine, epidemics (including plague), and economic disasters that ensued. The city fared better under the rule of Maria Theresa of Austria in the 18th century, thanks in part to the development of Lorraine's steel industry.

=== Modern times ===
The French Revolution shattered those advances. Virton had to wait until the departure of Napoleon in 1815 to see prosperous times again. Virton enthusiastically participated in the Belgian Revolution and even in the French Revolution of 1848. On August 22, 1914, at the onset of World War I, hundreds of inhabitants were summarily executed by the invading German army, while mass deportations occurred during World War II. Virton is now the centre of commerce and tourism for the Gaume region.

The town became an icon in Israeli sports history after Maccabi Tel Aviv defeated CSKA Moscow 91:79 in a European Basketball Champions' Cup game on 17 February 1977, in the town's sports arena. CSKA hosted the game in Virton due to lack of diplomatic relations between the Soviet Union and Israel at the time. The victory is widely considered as pivotal in Maccabi's history, thus making the town's name widely known among Israeli sports fans.

== Climate ==
Climate data for Virton
| Month | Jan | Feb | Mar | Apr | May | Jun | Jul | Aug | Sep | Oct | Nov | Dec | Year |
|---|---|---|---|---|---|---|---|---|---|---|---|---|---|
| Mean daily maximum °C (°F) | 4.4 (39.9) | 6.0 (42.8) | 10.0 (50.0) | 13.5 (56.3) | 18.2 (64.8) | 21.0 (69.8) | 23.4 (74.1) | 23.3 (73.9) | 19.1 (66.4) | 13.9 (57.0) | 7.9 (46.2) | 5.3 (41.5) | 13.8 (56.9) |
| Mean daily minimum °C (°F) | −0.8 (30.6) | −1.2 (29.8) | 0.9 (33.6) | 2.5 (36.5) | 6.8 (44.2) | 9.9 (49.8) | 11.7 (53.1) | 11.2 (52.2) | 8.2 (46.8) | 5.4 (41.7) | 1.9 (35.4) | 0.3 (32.5) | 4.7 (40.5) |
| Average precipitation mm (inches) | 101.0 (3.98) | 78.9 (3.11) | 86.7 (3.41) | 61.9 (2.44) | 78.8 (3.10) | 78.1 (3.07) | 76.7 (3.02) | 63.9 (2.52) | 78.2 (3.08) | 92.8 (3.65) | 95.1 (3.74) | 118.8 (4.68) | 1,010.9 (39.8) |
| Average precipitation days | 14 | 11 | 13 | 10 | 12 | 11 | 10 | 9 | 10 | 12 | 13 | 15 | 140 |
Source: World Meteorological Organisation (UN)

== Sights ==
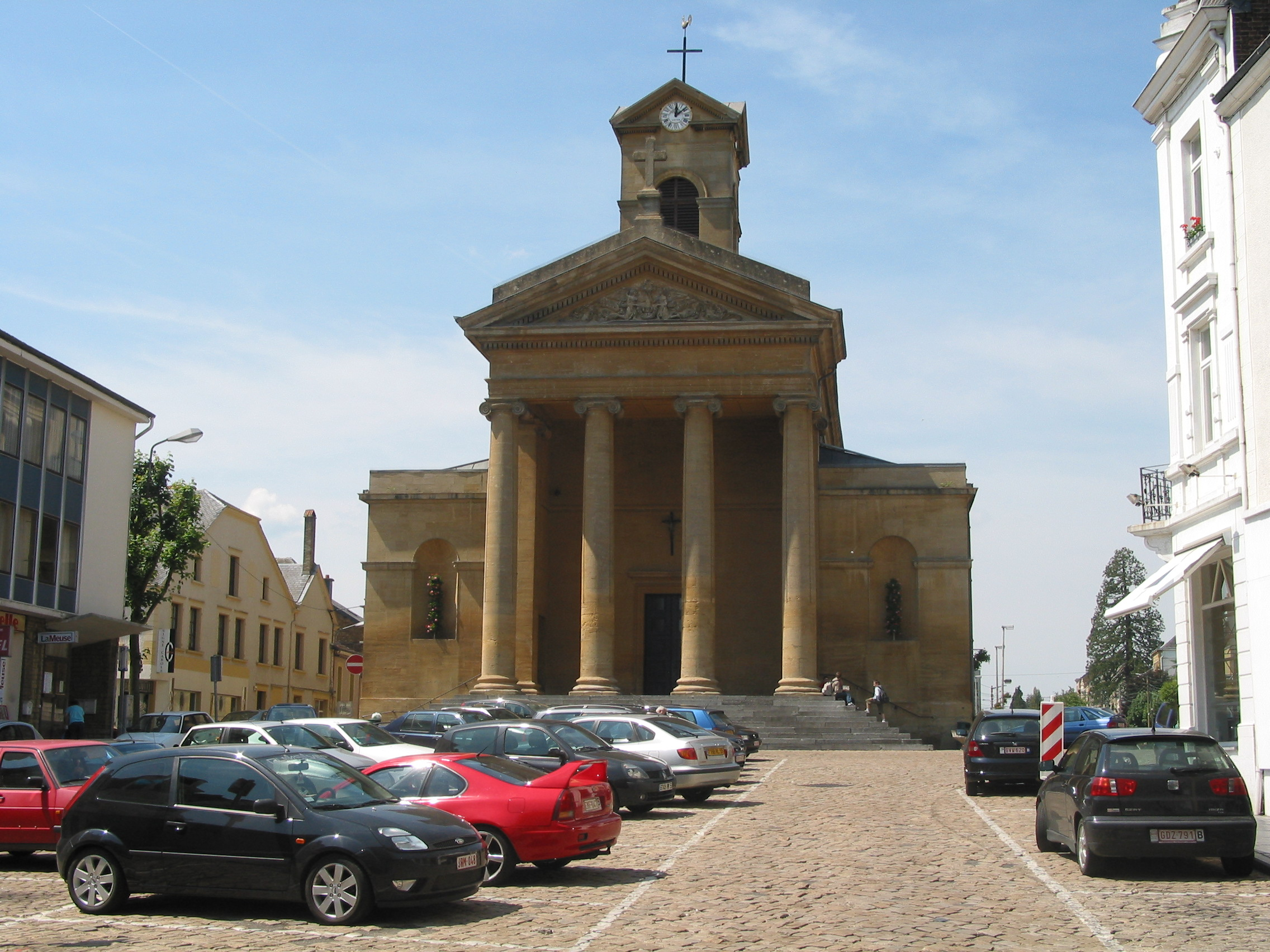
St Lawrence's church

- The small hilly streets and colourful houses.
- The church of St Lawrence, built between 1825 and 1830 with a classical façade.
- Remnants of the medieval defensive wall.
- Les Musées gaumais

== Folklore ==
- The city's mascot is D'Jean d'Mady, a typical, joyful, and resourceful Gaume inhabitant who was allegedly born in one of the neighbouring villages in 1585.
- Since 1935, Virton has owned two traditional giants who take part in the local festivities.

== Canadian friendship ==
Virton, Florenville, and many other neighbouring villages were the homes of many Canadian families whose fathers/husbands were stationed nearby at RCAF Station No. 1 (F) Wing, in Marville, France. Prior to moving the base to Lahr, Germany, there were ceremonies in these towns and in Longuyon, France (Permanent Married Quarters), where the Canadians left three small 'thunderbird' totem poles. These totems are still there and were rededicated in September 2005 on the 50th anniversary of the opening of the base.

== People born in Virton ==
- Ludwig Anton, Count Baillet de Latour (1753–1836), Austrian general, younger brother of Maximilian
- Maximilian Anton Karl, Count Baillet de Latour (1737–1806), Austrian general
- Charles Magnette (1863–1937), lawyer and politician
- Benoît Mariage (born 1961), film director
