= Luxembourg (Belgium) =

Province of Belgium

Province of Luxembourg Luxemburg (Dutch, German)
- Province of Belgium
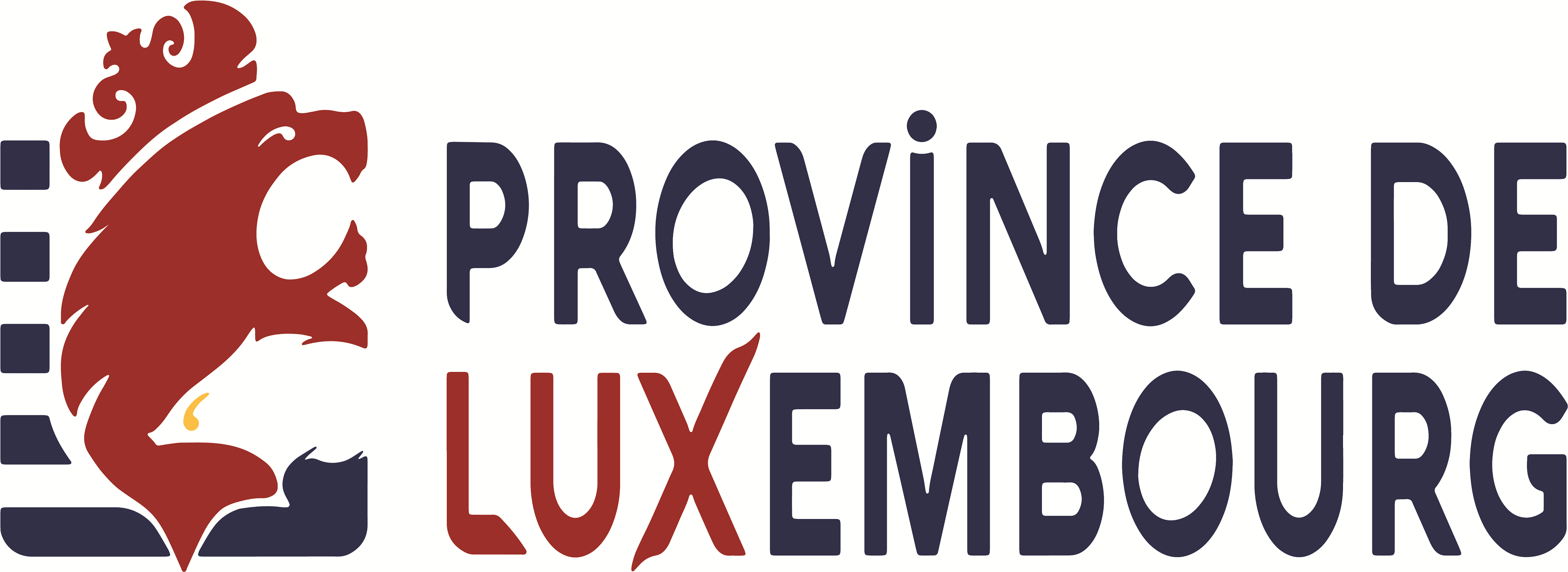
- Flag Coat of arms Brandmark

- Interactive map of Province of Luxembourg
- Coordinates: 49.92°N 5.42°E
- Country: Belgium
- Region: Wallonia
- Capital (and largest city): Arlon

Government
  - Governor: Olivier Schmitz

Area
  - Total: 4,459 km^{2} (1,722 sq mi)

Population (1 January 2024)
  - Total: 295,146
  - Density: 66.19/km^{2} (171.4/sq mi)

GDP
  - Total: €9.719 billion (2024)
  - Per capita: €32,505 (2024)
- ISO 3166 code: BE-WLX
- HDI (2021): 0.904 very high · 10th of 11
- Website: www.province.luxembourg.be

Luxembourg, (Note: /ˈlʌksəmbɜːrɡ/; French: Luxembourg [lyksɑ̃buʁ]; Dutch: Luxemburg [ˈlyksəmˌbʏr(ə)x]; German: Luxemburg [ˈlʊksm̩bʊʁk]; Luxembourgish: Lëtzebuerg [ˈlətsəbu̯əɕ]; Walloon: Lussimbork) also called Belgian Luxembourg or West Luxembourg, is the southernmost province of Wallonia within Belgium. It borders the country of Luxembourg to the east, the French departments of Ardennes, Meuse and Meurthe-et-Moselle to the south and southwest, and the Walloon provinces of Namur and Liège to the north. Its capital and largest city is Arlon, in the south-east of the province, near the border of the Grand Duchy of Luxembourg.

It has an area of 4,459 km^{2} (1,722 sq mi), making it the largest Belgian province. With around 295,000 residents as of January 2024, Luxembourg is also the least populated province, with a density of 64/km^{2} (170/sq mi), making it a relatively sparsely settled part of a very densely populated region, as well as the lowest density in Belgium. It is 71% larger than, but has less than half the population of, the neighboring Grand Duchy of Luxembourg. About eighty percent of the province is part of the densely wooded Ardennes region. The southernmost region of the province is called Gaume or Belgian Lorraine (main city: Virton).

The Arelerland, the region around Arlon (coloured red on the map of arrondissements, below) bordering the neighbouring Grand-Duchy of Luxembourg has the particularity that many of its residents have historically spoken Luxembourgish alongside of Walloon spoken elsewhere in the province.

The province was separated from the grand-duchy by the Third Partition of Luxembourg, in 1830–31 by the Conference of London dealing with the consequences of the Belgian Revolution of 1830. In 1839, after William I, King of the Netherlands and Grand Duke of Luxembourg, agreed to the terms of the partition and the province was given to the newly created Kingdom of Belgium.

An unofficial flag of the province exists, with the current colours of Luxembourg (red, white, and blue), as well as the province's coat of arms on the foreground.

== Subdivisions ==
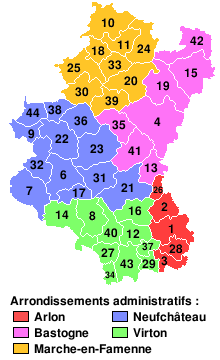
Province of Luxembourg composite map showing arrondissements (districts) and numbered municipalities.

Luxembourg province is divided into five administrative districts (French: arrondissements) containing a total of 43 municipalities (French: communes).

The unofficial flag of the province

Map no.	Municipality	Arrondissement
1	Arlon	Arlon
2	Attert	Arlon
3	Aubange	Arlon
4	Bastogne	Bastogne
6	Bertrix	Neufchâteau
7	Bouillon	Neufchâteau
8	Chiny	Virton
9	Daverdisse	Neufchâteau
10	Durbuy	Marche-en-Famenne
11	Érezée	Marche-en-Famenne
12	Étalle	Virton
13	Fauvillers	Bastogne
14	Florenville	Virton
15	Gouvy	Bastogne
16	Habay	Virton
17	Herbeumont	Neufchâteau
18	Hotton	Marche-en-Famenne
19	Houffalize	Bastogne
20	La Roche-en-Ardenne	Marche-en-Famenne
21	Léglise	Neufchâteau
22	Libin	Neufchâteau
23	Libramont-Chevigny	Neufchâteau
24	Manhay	Marche-en-Famenne
25	Marche-en-Famenne	Marche-en-Famenne
26	Martelange	Arlon
27	Meix-devant-Virton	Virton
28	Messancy	Arlon
29	Musson	Virton
30	Nassogne	Marche-en-Famenne
31	Neufchâteau	Neufchâteau
32	Paliseul	Neufchâteau
33	Rendeux	Marche-en-Famenne
34	Rouvroy	Virton
35	Sainte-Ode	Bastogne
36	Saint-Hubert	Neufchâteau
37	Saint-Léger	Virton
38	Tellin	Neufchâteau
39	Tenneville	Marche-en-Famenne
40	Tintigny	Virton
41	Vaux-sur-Sûre	Bastogne
42	Vielsalm	Bastogne
43	Virton	Virton
44	Wellin	Neufchâteau

== Economy ==
The gross domestic product (GDP) of the province was €7.0 billion in 2018, accounting for 1.5% of Belgium's economic output. GDP per capita adjusted for purchasing power was €21,800 or 72% of the EU27 average in the same year. Luxembourg was the province with the lowest GDP per capita. However, the province has some of the highest income inequalities in Belgium; towns like Arlon that border Luxembourg are known for their affluence, whereas other towns are among the poorest in the country.

== See also ==
- History of Luxembourg
