= Arelerland =

Cultural region in Belgium

Coordinates: 49°40′N 5°46′E

Unofficial flag

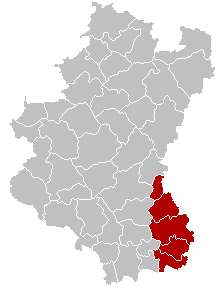
Arrondissement of Arlon

The Land of Arlon (Luxembourgish: Arelerland [ˈaːʀəlɐlɑnt]; German: Arelerland [ˈaːʁəlɐlant]; French: Pays d'Arlon [pe.i daʁlɔ̃]; Dutch: Land van Aarlen [ˌlɑnt fɑn ˈaːrlə(n)]) (Note: In isolation, van is pronounced [vɑn].) is the traditionally Luxembourgish-speaking part of Belgian Lorraine, which is now predominantly French-speaking. Arlon is the main city of this region.

The area borders the Gaume to the west and with the Grand-Duchy of Luxembourg to the east. It lies south of the Ardennes and largely coincides with the arrondissement of Arlon, part of the province of Luxembourg.

== Languages ==
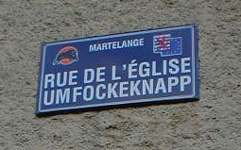
Bilingual street sign in Martelange.

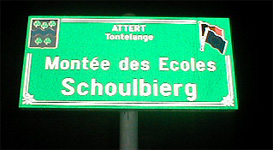
Bilingual street sign in Tontelange.

In the Land of Arlon, the traditional language is Luxembourgish, which is also spoken in the adjacent Grand-Duchy of Luxembourg. In 1990, the French Community of Belgium recognised the regional languages on its territory, of which Luxembourgish is one; however, it did not take any further measures.

=== Linguistic census results ===
The following data are the linguistic results of the census as they appeared in the Belgian Official Journal. Here the language shift from Luxembourgish to French is clearly visible.

- NL: Dutch
- FR: French
- DE: German (to be interpreted as Luxembourgish)

Language that is mostly or exclusively spoken

Year	NL Number	FR Number	DE Number	NL Pct.	FR Pct.	DE Pct.
1910	253	9,997	30,124	0.6%	24.8%	74.6%
1920	217	16,623	22,936	0.5%	41.8%	57.7%
1930	155	21,928	18,646	0.4%	53.8%	45.8%
1947	116	36,467	2,411	0.3%	93.5%	6.2%

Known languages

Year	only NL Number	NL & FR Number	only FR Number	FR & DE Number	only DE Number	DE & NL Number	NL & FR & DE Number	None Number	only NL Pct.	NL & FR Pct.	only FR Pct.	FR & DE Pct.	only DE Pct.	DE & NL Pct.	NL & FR & DE Pct.
1846	299		3,909		24,275				1.0%		13.7%		85.2%		
1866	68	127	3,221	6,342	19,465	23	68	1	0.2%	0.4%	11.0%	21.6%	66.4%	0.1%	0.2%
1880	362	161	3,799	9,459	16,007	8	75	60	1.2%	0.5%	12.7%	31.7%	53.6%	0.0%	0.3%
1890	7	179	4,827	13,523	14,818	14	327	2	0.0%	0.5%	14.3%	40.1%	44.0%	0.0%	1.0%
1900	144	323	6,203	18,950	10,108	11	294	1,867	0.4%	0.9%	17.2%	52.6%	28.1%	0.0%	0.8%
1910	122	415	8,045	20,670	10,892	7	238	2,165	0.3%	1.0%	19.9%	51.2%	27.0%	0.0%	0.6%
1920	94	407	11,566	20,842	6,715	2	350	1,346	0.2%	1.0%	28.9%	52.1%	16.8%	0.0%	0.9%
1930	45	432	15,914	18,456	5,562	7	326	1,763	0.1%	1.1%	39.1%	45.3%	13.7%	0.0%	0.8%
1947	14	675	27,234	9,726	733	4	1,071	1,605	0.0%	1.7%	69.0%	24.6%	1.9%	0.0%	2.7%

== Municipalities and villages in Arelerland ==
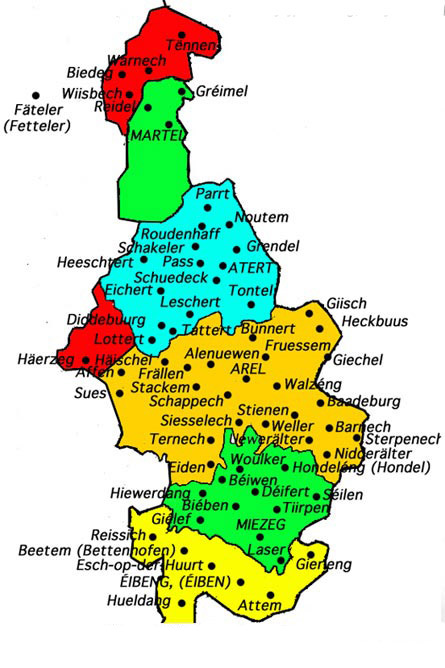
Map of the Luxembourgish language area within Belgium

These are the municipalities, with their sections and villages, in the Land of Arlon.

- Municipality of Arlon (Arel)
  - Arlon (Arel): Clairefontaine (Badebuerg), Fouches (Affen), Sampont (Sues), Sesselich (Siesselech)
  - Autelbas (Nidderälter): Autelhaut (Uewerälter), Barnich (Barnech), Stehnen (Stienen), Sterpenich (Sterpenech), Weyler (Weller)
  - Bonnert (Bunnert): Frassem (Fruessem), Seymerich (Seimerech), Viville (Alenuewen), Waltzing (Walzeng)
  - Guirsch (Giisch): Heckbous (Heckbus)
  - Heinsch (Häischel): Freylange (Frällen), Schoppach (Schappech), Stockem (Stackem)
  - Toernich (Ternech): Udange (Eiden)
- Municipality of Attert (Atert)
  - Attert (Atert): Grendel (Grendel), Luxeroth (Luxeroth), Post, Schadeck (Schuedeck), Schockville (Schakeler)
  - Nobressart (Gehaanselchert): Almeroth (Almeroth), Heinstert (Heeschtert)
  - Nothomb (Noutem): Parette (Parrt), Rodenhoff (Roudenhaff)
  - Thiaumont (Diddebuerg): Lischert (Leschert)
  - Tontelange (Tontel): Metzert (Metzert)
- Municipality of Aubange (Éibeng)
  - Aubange (Éibeng)
  - Athus (Attem): Guerlange (Gierleng)
  - Halanzy (Hueldang): Aix-sur-Cloie (Esch-op-der Huurt), Battincourt (Beetem)
  - Rachecourt (Réissech)
- Municipality of Martelange (Maartel): Grumelange, Radelange
- Municipality of Messancy (Miezeg)
  - Messancy (Miezeg): Differt (Déifert), Longeau (Laser), Turpange (Tiirpen)
  - Habergy (Hiewerdang): Bébange (Bieben), Guelff (Gielef)
  - Hondelange (Hondeleng)
  - Sélange (Séilen)
  - Wolkrange (Woulker): Buvange (Béiwen)
- Sections of municipalities that are not completely part of Arelerland
  - Hachy (Häerzeg), section of the municipality of Habay
  - Tintange (Tënnen), section of the municipality Fauvillers
    - Bodange (Biedeg)
    - Warnach (Warnech)
    - Wisembach (Wiisbech)
