= Numa Ensch-Tesch =

Belgian lawyer and politician

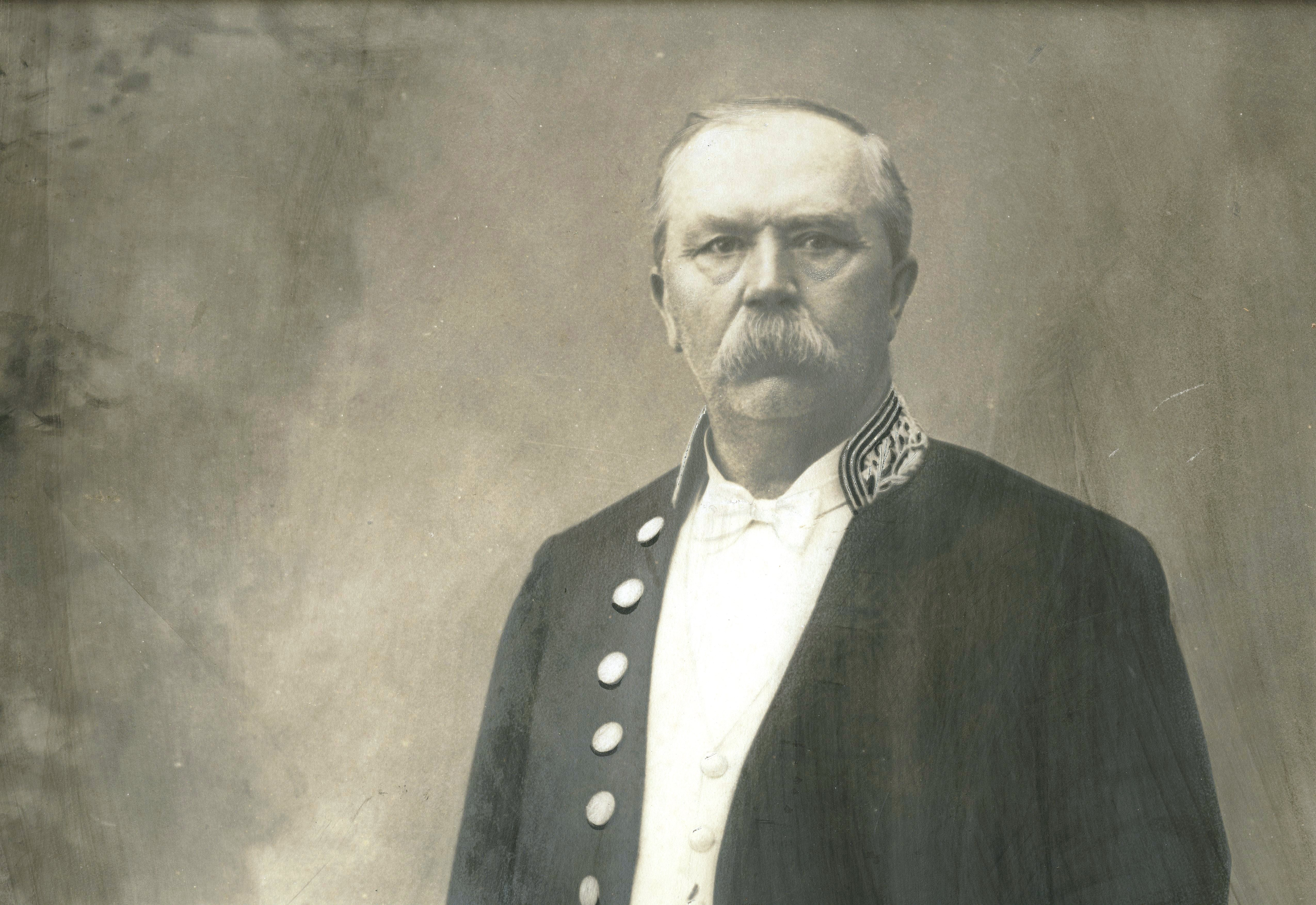
Numa Ensch-Tesch (1841-1929), portrait

Charles Numa Ensch(-Tesch) (June 10, 1841 – October 30, 1929), was a Belgian lawyer and politician.

== Education and career ==
Numa Ensch was born in Ruette, a son of Jean-Baptiste Ensch, secretary of the city council and provincial councillor, and Marie-Catherine Maud'huy. He married Flore Tesch, the daughter of Emmanuel Tesch and niece of Victor Tesch, and chose to append her name to his.

In 1866 he became a doctor of law at the Université libre de Bruxelles and became a member of the bar of Arlon, remaining a member until 1907. He also worked at L'Écho du Luxembourg, the liberal newspaper founded by Victor Tesch.

He was on the board of the steel company ARBED, which was founded in 1911.

He died in Arlon in 1929.

== Political career ==
In 1879 he became a member of the city council of Arlon. In 1889 he became schepen and from 1901 to 1921 he was the mayor of Arlon. Joseph Netzer was his predecessor and he was succeeded by Paul Reuter.

He was a member of the provincial council of Luxembourg from 1868 to 1885. In 1885 he was elected representative for the Virton arrondissement as a member of the Liberal Party; he held his seat until 1888.

== Commemoration ==
Avenue Numa Ensch-Tesch in Arlon was named after him.

== Sources ==
- La Belgique maçonnique. Bibliothèque universelle (in French). Brussels: Tillot. 1887. OCLC 27415720.
