= List of protected heritage sites in Arlon =

This table shows an overview of the protected heritage sites in the Walloon town Arlon. This list is part of Belgium's national heritage.

Object	Year/architect	Town/section	Address	Coordinates	Number^{?}	Image
Provincial palace and surroundings ^{(nl)} ^{(fr)}		Arlon	place Léopold n°1	49.682824°N 5.812677°E	81001-CLT-0002-01 Info	Provinciaal Paleis (gevels en daken van sommige gebouwen) en omgeving
Castle Sterpenich ^{(nl)} ^{(fr)}		Arlon Sterpenich	rue de Berlaymont, Autelbas	49.647411°N 5.888999°E	81001-CLT-0003-01 Info	Kasteel Sterpenich
Castle Autelbas ^{(nl)} ^{(fr)}		Arlon Autelbas	Neiewee	49.64705°N 5.86505°E	81001-CLT-0004-01 Info	Kasteel Autelbas
Castle Guirsch ^{(nl)} ^{(fr)}		Arlon		49.719014°N 5.855268°E	81001-CLT-0005-01 Info	Kasteel Guirsch (M) en omgeving gevormd door het kasteel, het terrein en de omliggende gebouwen
Castle Guirsch extension to chateau ^{(nl)} ^{(fr)}		Arlon	rue du Château (S).	49.719335°N 5.854910°E	81001-CLT-0006-01 Info	Kasteel van Guirsch met aanhorige gebouwen en nabijgelegen boerderij en omgeving
Chapel of St. Aubin de Heckbous ^{(nl)} ^{(fr)}		Arlon	Guirsch	49.709767°N 5.862761°E	81001-CLT-0007-01 Info	Kapel Saint-Aubin de Heckbous
Les Marais de Heinsch		Arlon		49.693959°N 5.726252°E	81001-CLT-0009-01 Info	
Ossuary ^{(nl)} ^{(fr)}		Arlon	rue Dominique (actuellement rue Saint-Servais, devant le n°55)	49.636266°N 5.772295°E	81001-CLT-0010-01 Info	Schedelplaats (zie Golgotha)
Cross placed at roadside ^{(nl)} ^{(fr)}		Arlon	rue de Habergy, à gauche du n°1	49.635919°N 5.770082°E	81001-CLT-0011-01 Info	Kruis, geplaatst langs de provinciale weg
Ossuary in the graveyard of Udange ^{(nl)} ^{(fr)}		Arlon		49.639563°N 5.761574°E	81001-CLT-0012-01 Info	Schedelplaats in de nieuwe omheining van de begraafplaats van Udange
Ossuary ^{(nl)} ^{(fr)}		Arlon	rue Haute, links van nummer 56	49.652553°N 5.779790°E	81001-CLT-0013-01 Info	Schedelplaats in Toernich op de hoofdbaan
Stations of the Cross ^{(nl)} ^{(fr)}		Arlon		49.640374°N 5.774672°E	81001-CLT-0015-01 Info	Kruisweg aan het einde van Udange op de provinciale weg (weg naar Hirtzenberg) naar Arlon
Public toilet ^{(nl)} ^{(fr)}		Arlon		49.698901°N 5.747556°E	81001-CLT-0017-01 Info	Openbaar toilet in het oude centrum van Heinsch, route de Neufchâteau
Stations of the Cross ^{(nl)} ^{(fr)}		Arlon	rue de la Gendarmerie, face au n°8, à Sterpenich	49.647741°N 5.890263°E	81001-CLT-0022-01 Info	Kruisweg langs de muur rondom de tuin van het kasteel van de graven van Berlaymont
Stations of the Cross ^{(nl)} ^{(fr)}		Arlon	rue du Hämmelsmarsch, devant le n°32	49.651034°N 5.865937°E	81001-CLT-0023-01 Info	Kruisweg St.Valentiijn gebouwd op het terras aan de voorzijde van de woning gelegen aan rue du centre n°93 in Barnich
Stations of the Cross ^{(nl)} ^{(fr)}		Arlon	Sterpenich cemetery	49.649629°N 5.888999°E	81001-CLT-0024-01 Info	Kruisweg tegen de muur van het kerkhof Sterpenich (Kirchberg)
Stations of the Cross ^{(nl)} ^{(fr)}		Arlon	rue du Centre across from number 6	49.682754°N 5.836784°E	81001-CLT-0025-01 Info	Kruisweg gelegen aan rue du Centre, tegenover nummer zes (nu rue du Ponceau, op nummer 3) naar Waltzing
Stations of the Cross ^{(nl)} ^{(fr)}		Arlon	23 rue de Hondelange	49.650890°N 5.842245°E	81001-CLT-0026-01 Info	
Stations of the Cross ^{(nl)} ^{(fr)}		Arlon	De Cle des Champs, in front of number 3	49.658372°N 5.837184°E	81001-CLT-0027-01 Info	Kruisweg val van Christus, de Cle des Champs, voor n°3 in Stehnem
Stations of the Cross ^{(nl)} ^{(fr)}		Arlon	Grubermühle	49.722928°N 5.837051°E	81001-CLT-0028-01 Info	Kruisweg op een plaats genaamd "Grubermühle"
Stations of the Cross ^{(nl)} ^{(fr)}		Arlon	Heckbous-Guirsch	49.720588°N 5.857557°E	81001-CLT-0029-01 Info	Kruisweg bij Heckbous-Guirsch
Stations of the Cross ^{(nl)} ^{(fr)}		Arlon	corner of rue de la Sablière and Fouche road	49.685016°N 5.711800°E	81001-CLT-0030-01 Info	Kruisweg langs de Romeinse weg naar Fouche, bij de hoek van de rue de la Sablière
Stations of the Cross ^{(nl)} ^{(fr)}		Arlon	vallée des Trois Moulins	49.706089°N 5.850906°E	81001-CLT-0031-01 Info	Kruisweg in de vallée des Trois Moulins bij Guirsch
Stations of the Cross ^{(nl)} ^{(fr)}		Arlon	rue de Hachy, near number 95	49.693086°N 5.695096°E	81001-CLT-0032-01 Info	Kruisweg langs de weg-Fouches Hachy naar Fouches (nu rue de Hachy, bij n°95)
Trail to St. Donat ^{(nl)} ^{(fr)}		Arlon		49.684129°N 5.815854°E	81001-CLT-0033-01 Info	Koninklijke klim naar Saint-Donat
Old house ^{(nl)} ^{(fr)}		Arlon	avenue de la Gare, 29	49.680610°N 5.810376°E	81001-CLT-0034-01 Info	Gebouw (voorkant en dak), avenue de la Gare, 29
Parts of building called "Les Caves" ^{(nl)} ^{(fr)}		Arlon	Grand-Rue, 57	49.682961°N 5.816242°E	81001-CLT-0035-01 Info	
Du Landbrough House ^{(nl)} ^{(fr)}		Arlon		49.654740°N 5.683657°E	81001-CLT-0039-01 Info	"du Landbrough" en omgeving
St. Martin's church ^{(nl)} ^{(fr)}	1907-1914	Arlon		49.682656°N 5.809241°E	81001-CLT-0040-01 Info	Sint-Maartenskerk ('Saint-Martin') (M) en een beschermingszone (ZP)
Synagogue ^{(nl)} ^{(fr)}		Arlon	rue Saint Jean	49.683115°N 5.818718°E	81001-CLT-0041-01 Info	Alles van de synagoge in de rue Saint Jean in Arlon
Old church of St. Martin and Gallo-Roman ruins ^{(nl)} ^{(fr)}		Arlon	rue de Thermes	49.680738°N 5.817102°E	81001-CLT-0042-01 Info	De complete overblijfselen van de oude kerk van St. Martin en Gallo-Romeinse ruïnes in rue de Thermes in Arlon (M).
Center of the village of Guirsch ^{(nl)} ^{(fr)}		Arlon		49.717552°N 5.851842°E	81001-CLT-0043-01 Info	Het centrum van het dorp van Guirsch
parts of the building "Les Caves" ^{(nl)} ^{(fr)}		Arlon		49.682961°N 5.816242°E	81001-PEX-0001-01 Info	
Church of St Martin excepting the organ ^{(nl)} ^{(fr)}		Arlon		49.682656°N 5.809241°E	81001-PEX-0002-01 Info	Ensemble Sint-Maartenskerk met uitzondering van het orgel
Du Landbrough ^{(nl)} ^{(fr)}		Arlon		49.654740°N 5.683657°E	81001-PEX-0003-01 Info	

== See also ==
- List of protected heritage sites in Luxembourg (Belgium)
- Arlon
