= Belgian Lorraine =

Natural region in Belgium

Coordinates: 49°39′N 5°39′E

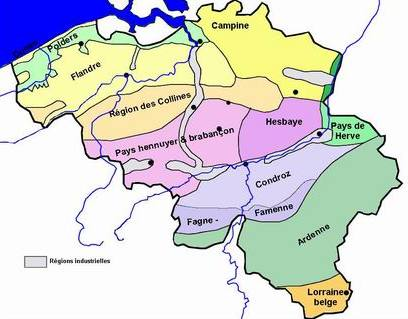
Belgian Lorraine (French: Lorraine belge) in the south of Belgium.

Belgian Lorraine is the part of Lorraine that lies in the south of the Belgian province of Luxembourg, in Wallonia.

The term is used solely in a geological context, as the region borders the geologically-distinct Ardennes, to the north.

Culturally and linguistically, Belgian Lorraine is made up of two sub-regions:

- The Romance-speaking part (in which French dialects are spoken) called Gaume, with Virton as the main cultural city.
- The Luxembourgish-speaking part called Land of Arlon (in Luxembourgish: Arelerland), with Arlon (Arel) as the main cultural city and the capital of the (Belgian) province of Luxembourg.

Both have Standard French as official administrative language, with Luxembourgish recognised as a minority language by the French Community of Belgium.
