= Guirsch =

Sectoon of Arlon, Wallonia, Belgium

Guirsch Giisch (Luxembourgish) Girsch (German)
- Sub-municipality of Arlon
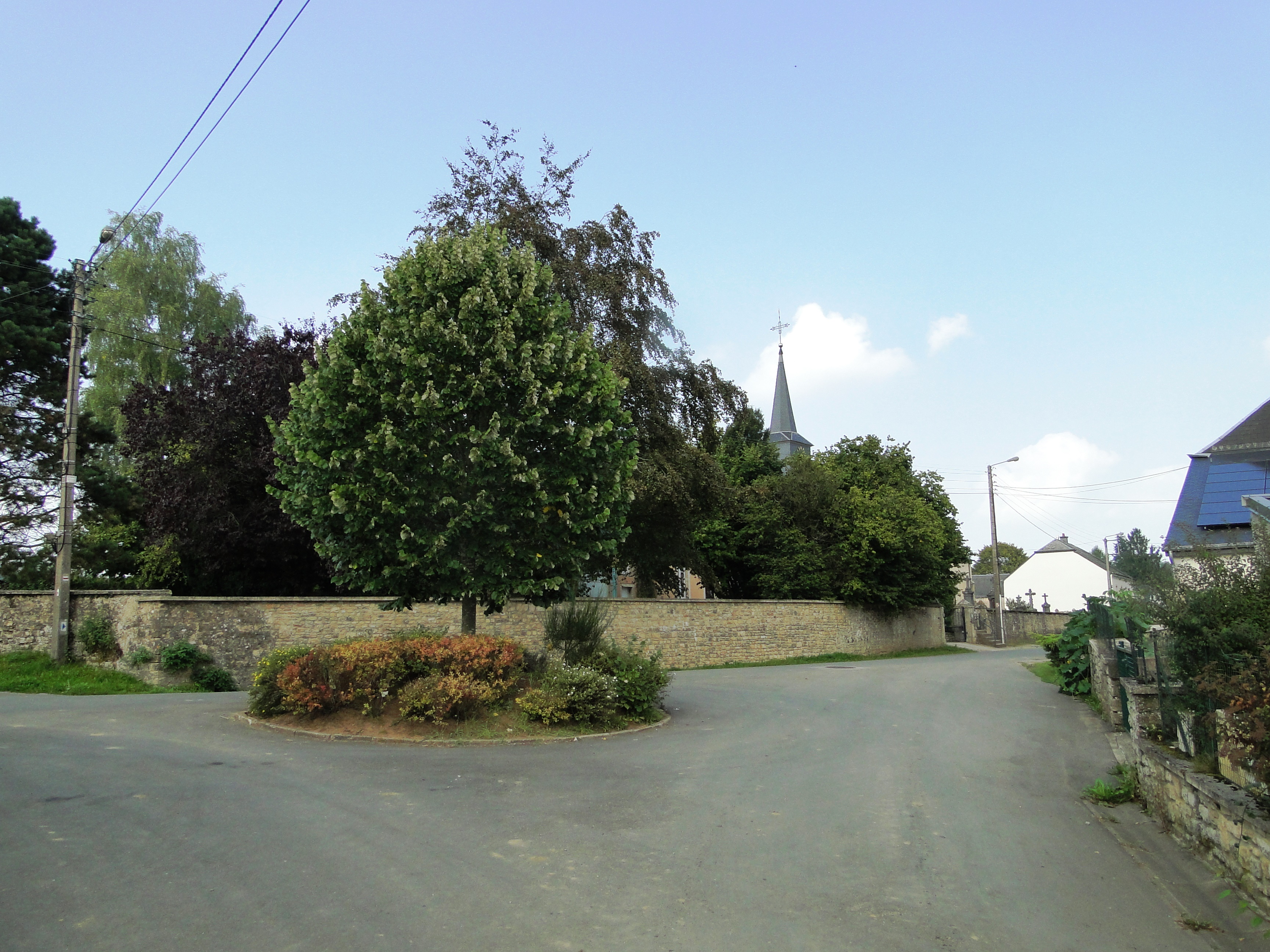

- Coat of arms

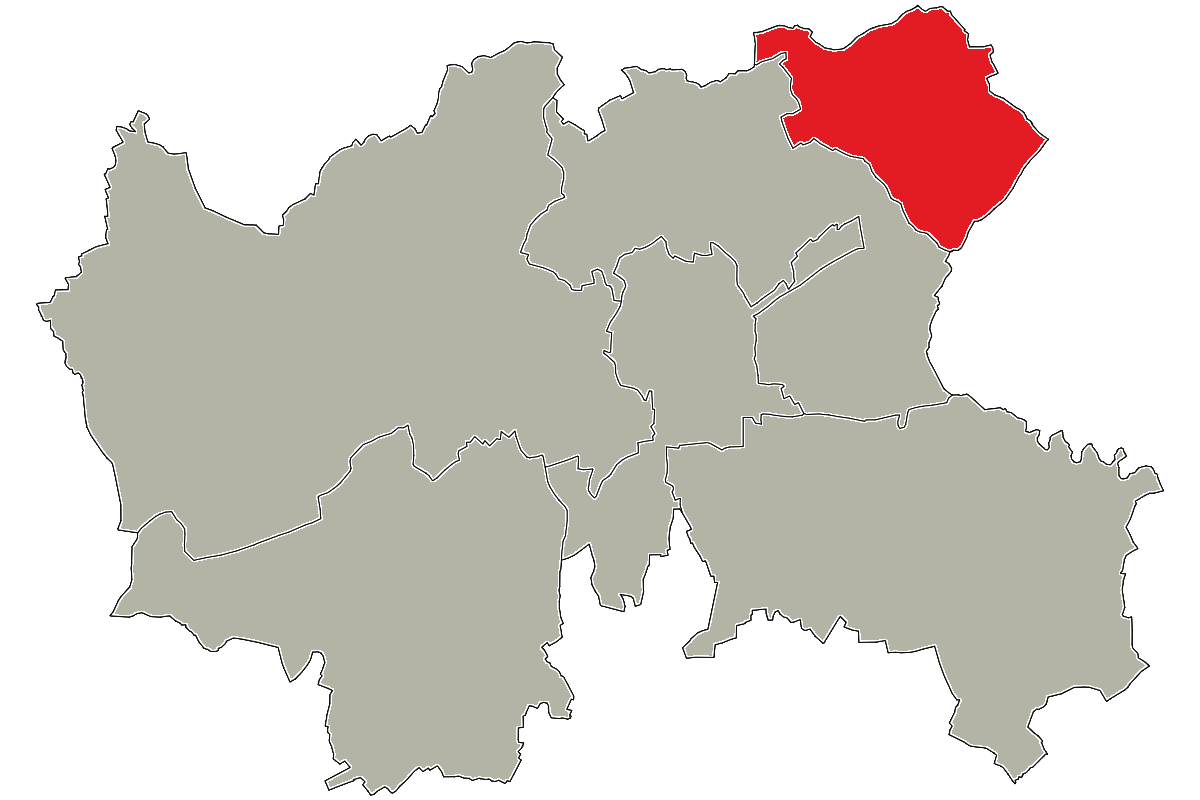
- Location of Guirsch in Arlon
- Interactive map of Guirsch
- Location within Belgium Location within Luxembourg (Belgium)
- Coordinates: 49°43′06″N 5°51′06″E
- Country: Belgium
- Community: French Community
- Region: Wallonia
- Province: Luxembourg
- Arrondissement: Arlon
- Municipality: Arlon

Area
  - Total: 8.32 km^{2} (3.21 sq mi)

Population (2020-01-01)
  - Total: 272
  - Density: 32.7/km^{2} (84.7/sq mi)
- Postal codes: 6704
- Area codes: 063

Guirsch (French pronunciation: [ɡiʁʃ]; Luxembourgish: Giisch; German: Girsch) is a sub-municipality of the city of Arlon located in the province of Luxembourg, Wallonia, Belgium. It was a separate municipality until 1977. On 1 January 1977, it was merged into Arlon.
