= Gaspar Museum =

Coordinates: 49°41′02″N 5°48′39″W

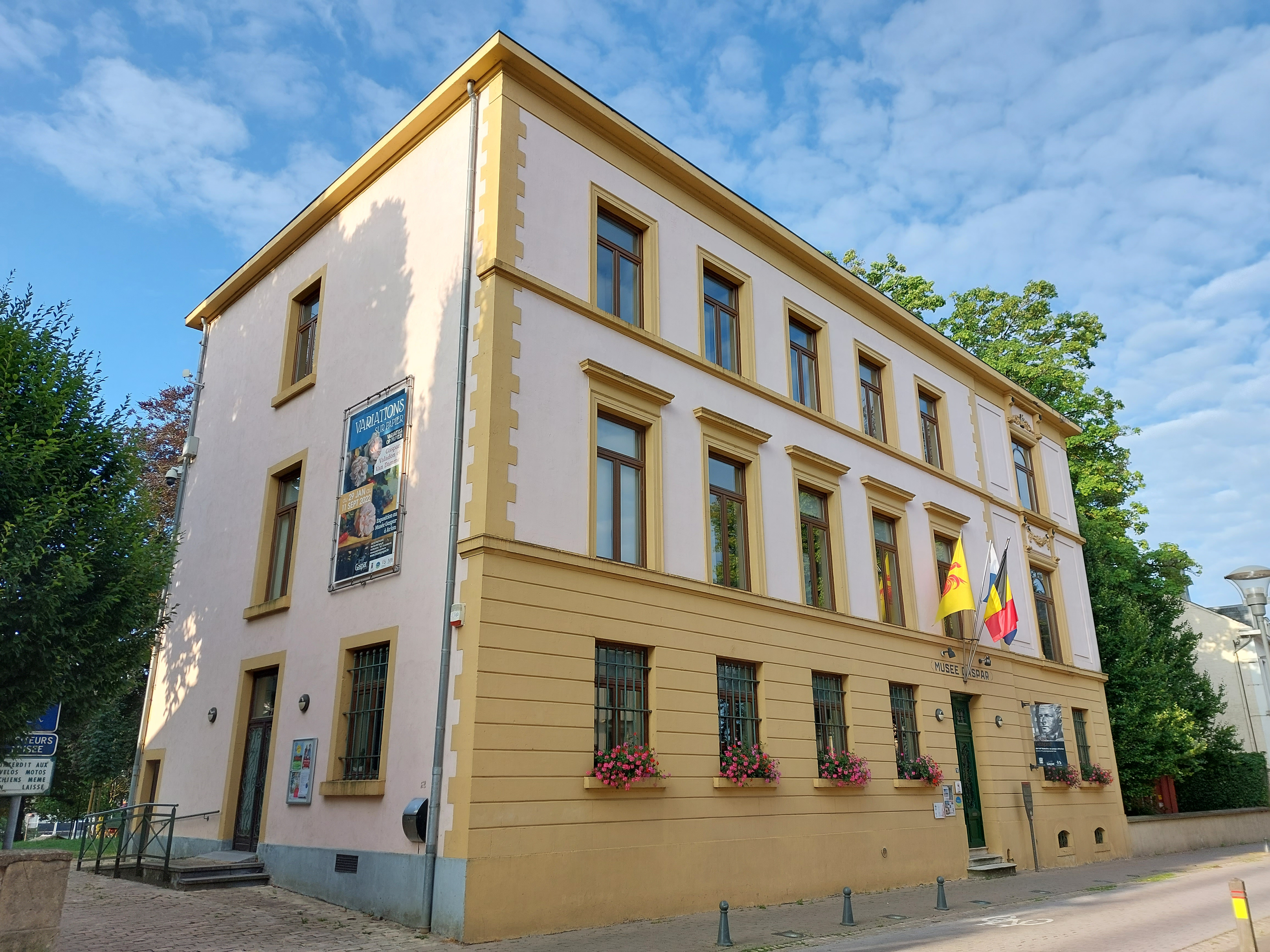
The building of the Gaspar Museum in Arlon

The Gaspar Museum (French: Musée Gaspar, Dutch: Gaspar Museum) is an art museum in Arlon, in the Luxembourg province of Belgium. The museum is dedicated to the art of sculptor Jean-Marie Gaspar (1861–1931) and the work of his brother, photographer Charles Gaspar (1871–1950), who were both born in Arlon. The museum also has a collection of regional art, including the 16th-century Fisenne altarpiece originally from the village Fisenne. In addition, the museum hosts temporary art exhibitions. The museum building is a former bank, built in the 19th century, which at one point belonged to the Gaspar family. Since 1954 the building is owned by the city of Arlon.
