= Gaume =

Cultural region in Belgium and France

Coordinates: 49°37′N 5°34′E

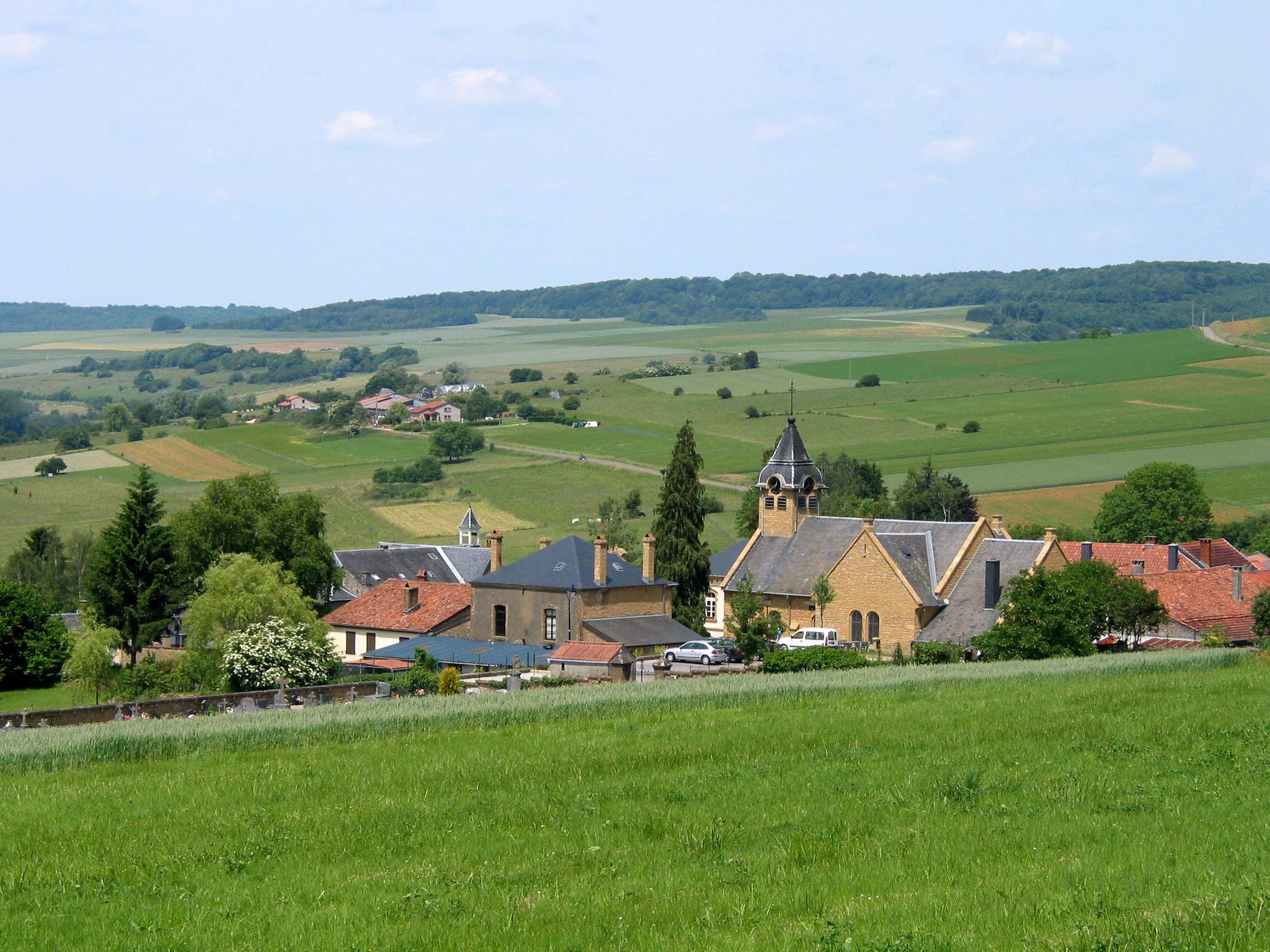
The countryside near Torgny

Gaume (French pronunciation: [ɡom]) is a region in the extreme southeast of Belgium. At a lower altitude than the Ardennes, it borders the French region of Lorraine to the south (although some consider the bordering parts of Lorraine to be Gaume française), the Land of Arlon (Luxembourgish: Arelerland) to the east, and the Belgian part of the Ardennes to the north.

In cultural terms, Gaume is the Romance-speaking part of what is now called Belgian Lorraine, Arelerland being its Luxembourgish-speaking part.

Gaume was part of the Grand-Duchy of Luxembourg till 1839, when it was integrated in the newly created Belgian province of Luxembourg.

It is composed of the districts of Chiny, Étalle, Florenville, Habay, Meix-devant-Virton, Musson, Rouvroy, Tintigny and Virton, but some villages in the northern districts are not in Gaume (as Suxy or Hachy).

Historically, the area around Montmédy, Carignan and Charency-Vezin, that was ceded to France by Spain in 1659, is also part of Gaume. Therefore, strictly speaking, the southern border of the region is not the border with France. The French part of the Gaume, named Gaume française by some, is part of a greater cluster of former Luxembourgish territories called French Luxembourg. It consists of the canton of Montmédy, almost all of the canton of Carignan and parts of the cantons of Damvillers and Longuyon. It largely corresponds with the now French part of the county of Chiny.

The unofficial capital of the Gaume region is Virton.

Temperatures in this region are often 1 °C to 3 °C higher than in other parts of the province of Luxembourg because of a distinctive microclimate.

Gaume is a popular destination for tourism in Belgium.

The Lorrain language, a langue d'oïl that is distinct from the Walloon language, is a minority language in Gaume, where it is known as gaumais. Although it is declining, several local authors are trying to revive its usage. Lorrain is recognized as a regional language of Wallonia.

== Gallery ==
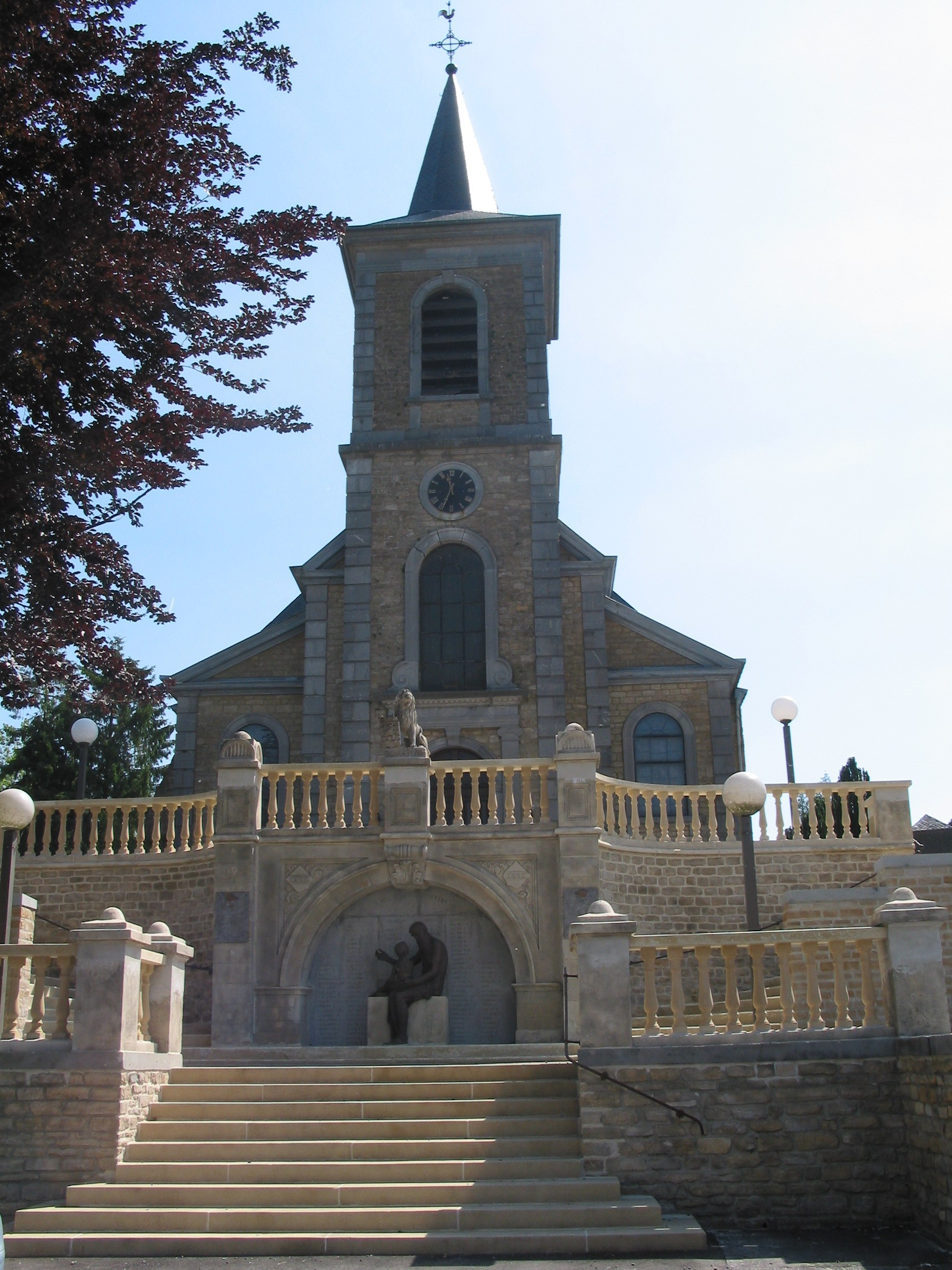
The Church of Tintigny

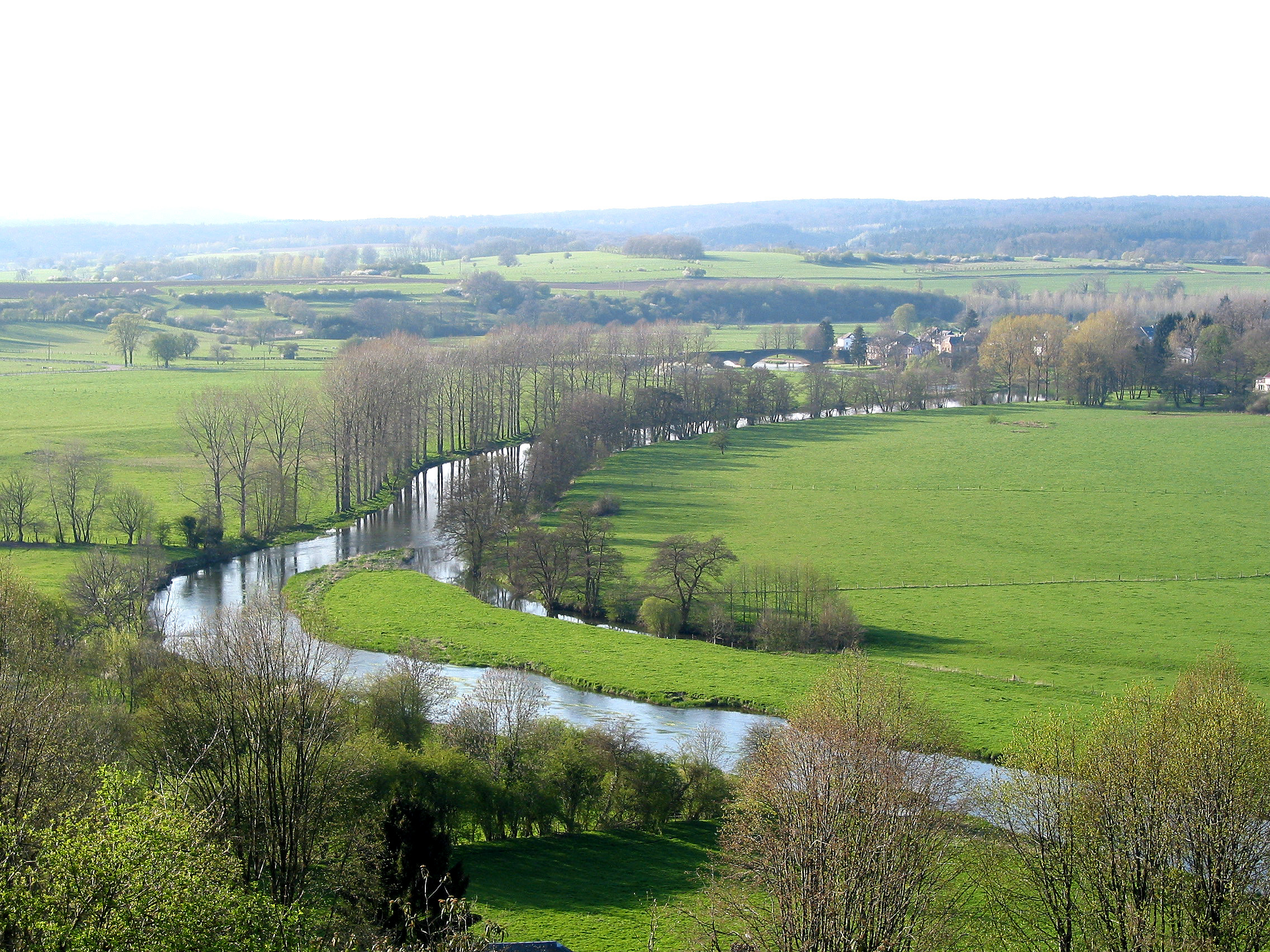
The Semois river near Florenville

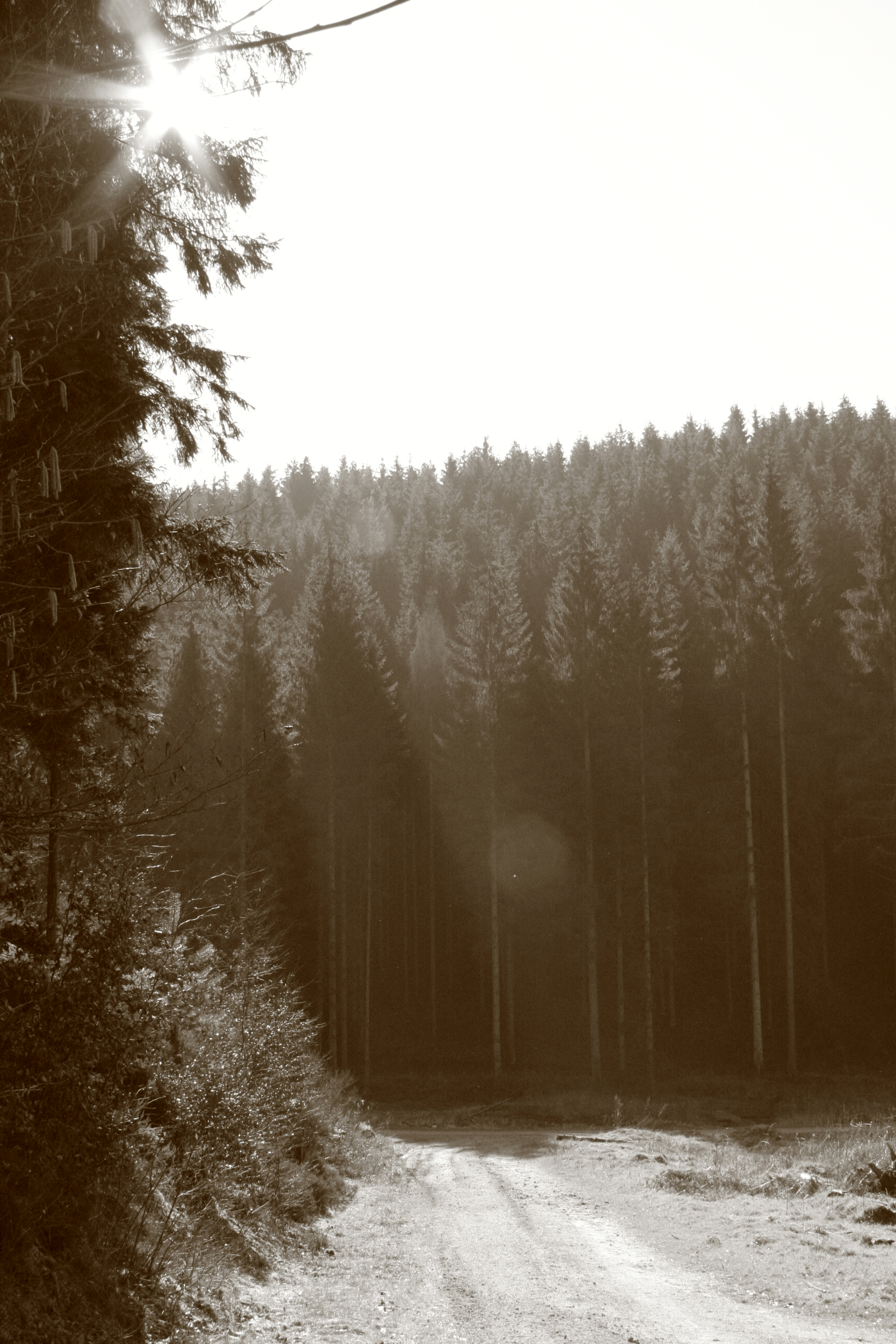
Forest in Gaume

== See also ==
- Gaume Natural Park
