= Autelbas =

Section of Arlon, Wallonia, Belgium

Autelbas Nidderälter (Luxembourgish) Niederelter (German)
- Sub-municipality of Arlon
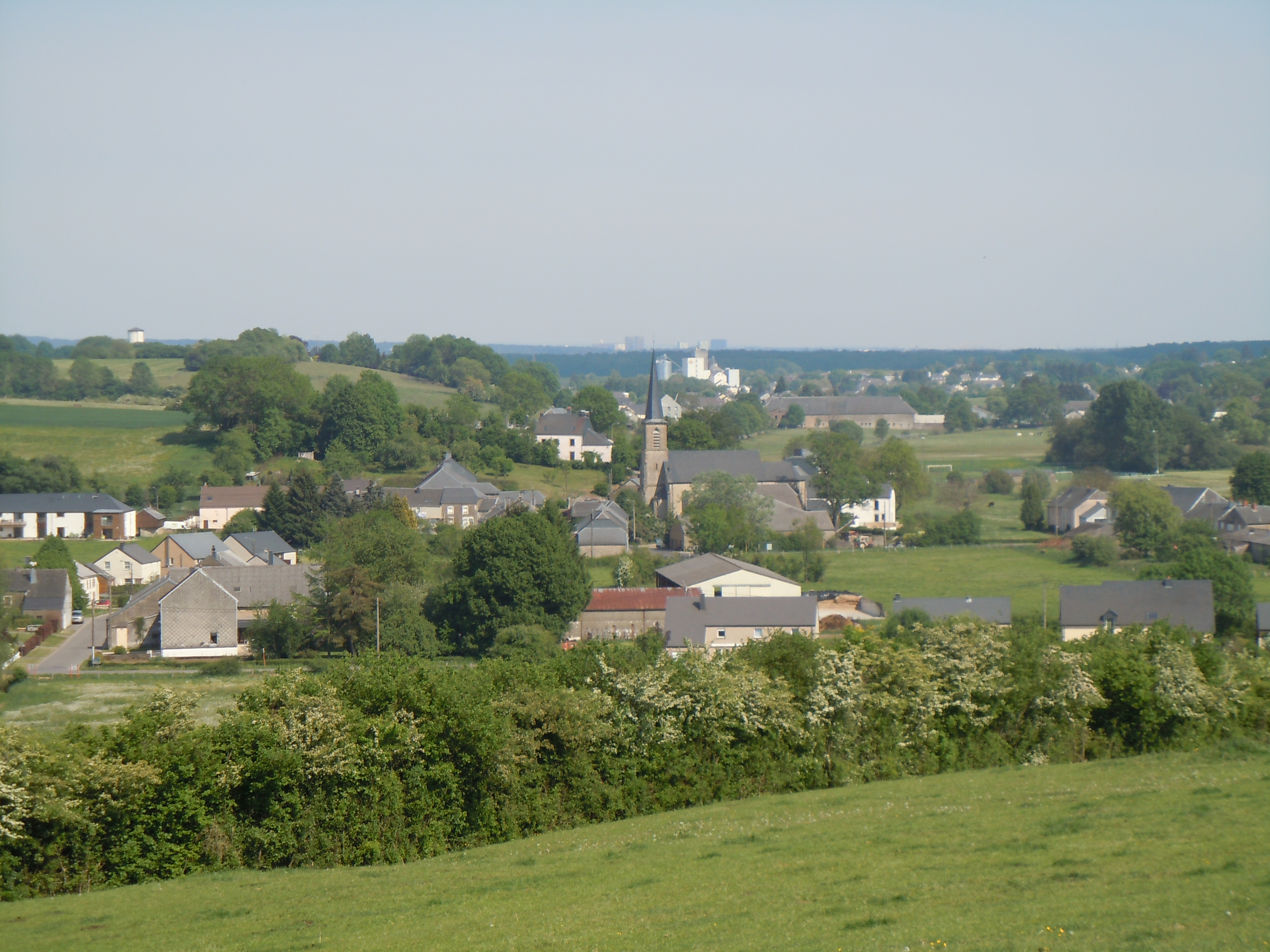

- Coat of arms

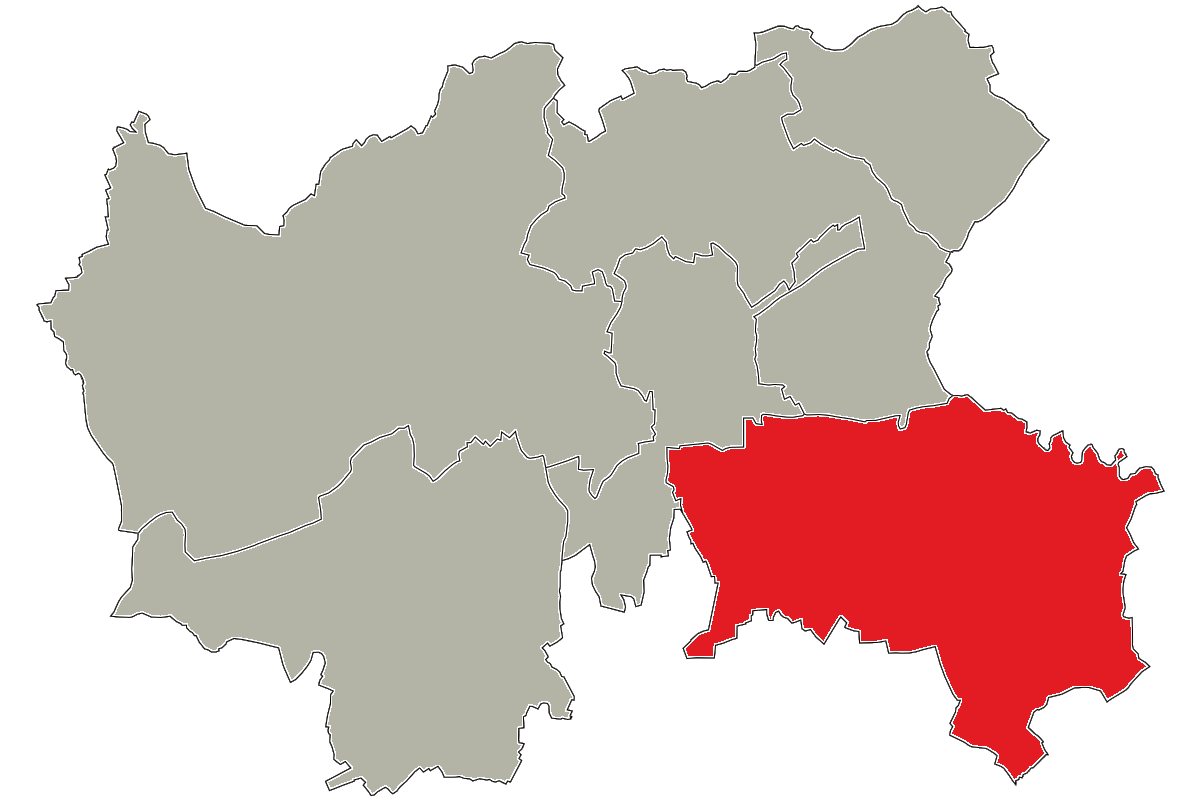
- Location of Autelbas in Arlon
- Interactive map of Autelbas
- Location within Belgium Location within Luxembourg (Belgium)
- Coordinates: 49°39′00″N 5°52′00″E
- Country: Belgium
- Community: French Community
- Region: Wallonia
- Province: Luxembourg
- Arrondissement: Arlon
- Municipality: Arlon

Area
  - Total: 24.16 km^{2} (9.33 sq mi)

Population (2022)
  - Total: 2,547
  - Density: 105.4/km^{2} (273.0/sq mi)
- Postal codes: 6706
- Area codes: 063

Autelbas (French: [otɛlba]; Luxembourgish: Nidderälter; German: Niederelter) is a sub-municipality of the city of Arlon located in the province of Luxembourg, Wallonia, Belgium. It was a separate municipality until 1977. On 1 January 1977, it was merged into Arlon.
