= List of protected heritage sites in Attert =

This table shows an overview of the protected heritage sites in the Walloon town Attert. This list is part of Belgium's national heritage.

| Object | Year/architect | Town/section | Address | Coordinates | Number^{?} | Image |
|---|---|---|---|---|---|---|
| Old church of St. Etienne ^{(nl)} ^{(fr)} | | Attert | rue de Grendel | 49.750370°N 5.787461°E | 81003-CLT-0002-01 Info | Oude kerk Saint-Etienne |
| Fragment of the Way of the Cross ^{(nl)} ^{(fr)} | | Attert | | 49.711634°N 5.726137°E | 81003-CLT-0003-01 Info | |
| Stations of the Cross ^{(nl)} ^{(fr)} | | Attert | | 49.713880°N 5.737834°E | 81003-CLT-0004-01 Info | |
| Stations of the Cross ^{(nl)} ^{(fr)} | | Attert | | 49.721020°N 5.756040°E | 81003-CLT-0005-01 Info | |
| Stations of the Cross ^{(nl)} ^{(fr)} | | Attert | | 49.726335°N 5.809309°E | 81003-CLT-0006-01 Info | |
| Stations of the Cross ^{(nl)} ^{(fr)} | | Attert | | 49.725601°N 5.808582°E | 81003-CLT-0007-01 Info | |
| City Hall ^{(nl)} ^{(fr)} | | Attert | rue de Bastogne n° 19 | 49.751820°N 5.784608°E | 81003-CLT-0008-01 Info | Raadhuis, voormalig klooster: gevels en daken, en het ensemble van de gebouwen en de omliggende terreinen |
| Park ^{(fr)} | | Attert | | 49.724263°N 5.725603°E | 81003-CLT-0009-01 Info | |
| Stations of the Cross ^{(nl)} ^{(fr)} | | Attert | | 49.750261°N 5.787640°E | 81003-CLT-0010-01 Info | |
| Stations of the Cross ^{(nl)} ^{(fr)} | | Attert | | 49.712415°N 5.737874°E | 81003-CLT-0011-01 Info | |
| Chapel of the Cross of the Innocents ^{(nl)} ^{(fr)} | | Attert | | 49.724815°N 5.790725°E | 81003-CLT-0012-01 Info | |

== See also ==
- List of protected heritage sites in Luxembourg (Belgium)
- Attert
