= Attert =

Municipality in Wallonia, Belgium

Attert Atert (Luxembourgish)
- Municipality
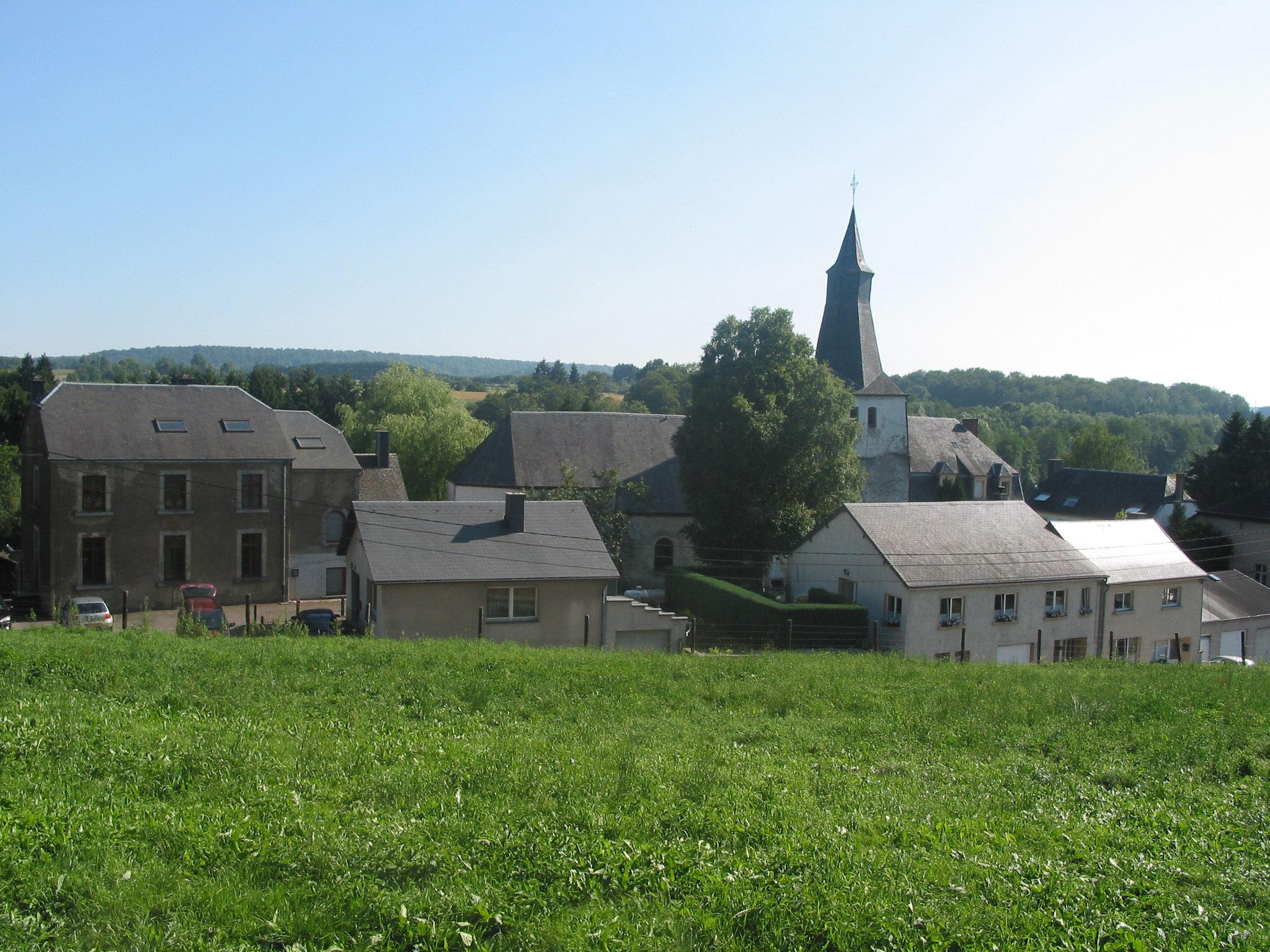
- Neighbourhood of St. Stephen's Church

- Flag Coat of arms

- Location of Attert in Luxembourg province
- Interactive map of Attert
- Location in Belgium
- Coordinates: 49°45′N 5°47′E
- Country: Belgium
- Community: French Community
- Region: Wallonia
- Province: Luxembourg
- Arrondissement: Arlon

Government
  - Mayor: Vacant

Area
  - Total: 71.08 km^{2} (27.44 sq mi)

Population (2018-01-01)
  - Total: 5,537
  - Density: 77.90/km^{2} (201.8/sq mi)
- Postal codes: 6717
- NIS code: 81003
- Area codes: 063
- Website: www.attert.be (in French)

Attert (French pronunciation: [atɛʁt]; Luxembourgish: Atert; Walloon: Ater) is a municipality of Wallonia located in the province of Luxembourg, Belgium.

On 1 January 2007 the municipality, which covers 70.94 km^{2}, had 4,802 inhabitants, giving a population density of 67.7 inhabitants per km^{2}.

The municipality consists of the following districts: Attert, Nobressart, Nothomb, Thiaumont, and Tontelange.

Other population centers include:

- Almeroth
- Grendel
- Heinstert
- Lischert
- Lottert
- Louchert
- Luxeroth
- Metzert
- Parette
- Post
- Rodenhoff
- Schadeck
- Schockville

The municipality falls within the Luxembourgish-speaking Arelerland and several street name signs are bilingual.

== Sister cities ==
Attert is twinned with:

- Taktaharkány (Hungary) since 2003
- Kruishoutem (Belgium) since 2004
- Bakałarzewo (Poland) since 2005
- Bandundu, Democratic Republic of the Congo)

== See also ==
- List of protected heritage sites in Attert
