= Heinsch, Belgium =

Section of Arlon, Wallonia, Belgium

Heinsch Häischel (Luxembourgish) Heischlingen (German)
- Sub-municipality of Arlon
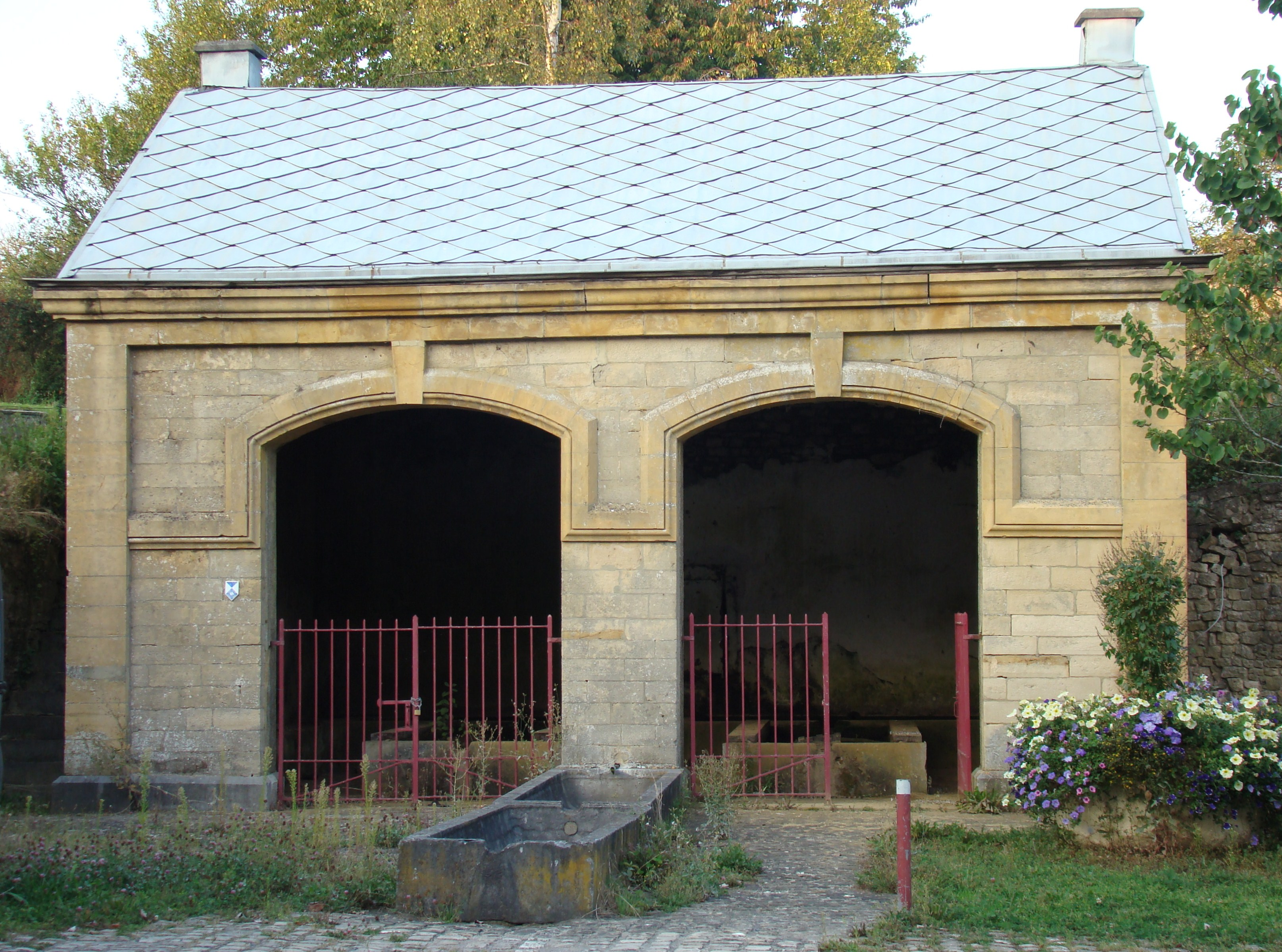
- Interactive map of Heinsch
- Location within Belgium Location within Luxembourg (Belgium)
- Coordinates: 49°43′06″N 5°51′06″E
- Country: Belgium
- Community: French Community
- Region: Wallonia
- Province: Luxembourg
- Arrondissement: Arlon
- Municipality: Arlon

Area
  - Total: 39.07 km^{2} (15.09 sq mi)

Population (2020-01-01)
  - Total: 5,457
  - Density: 139.7/km^{2} (361.7/sq mi)
- Postal codes: 6700
- Area codes: 063

Heinsch (French pronunciation: [ɛ̃ʃ]; Luxembourgish: Häischel; German: Heischlingen) is a sub-municipality of the city of Arlon located in the province of Luxembourg, Wallonia, Belgium. It was a separate municipality until 1977. On 1 January 1977, it was merged into Arlon.
