= Bonnert =

Section of Arlon, Wallonia, Belgium

Bonnert Bunnert (Luxembourgish)
- Sub-municipality of Arlon
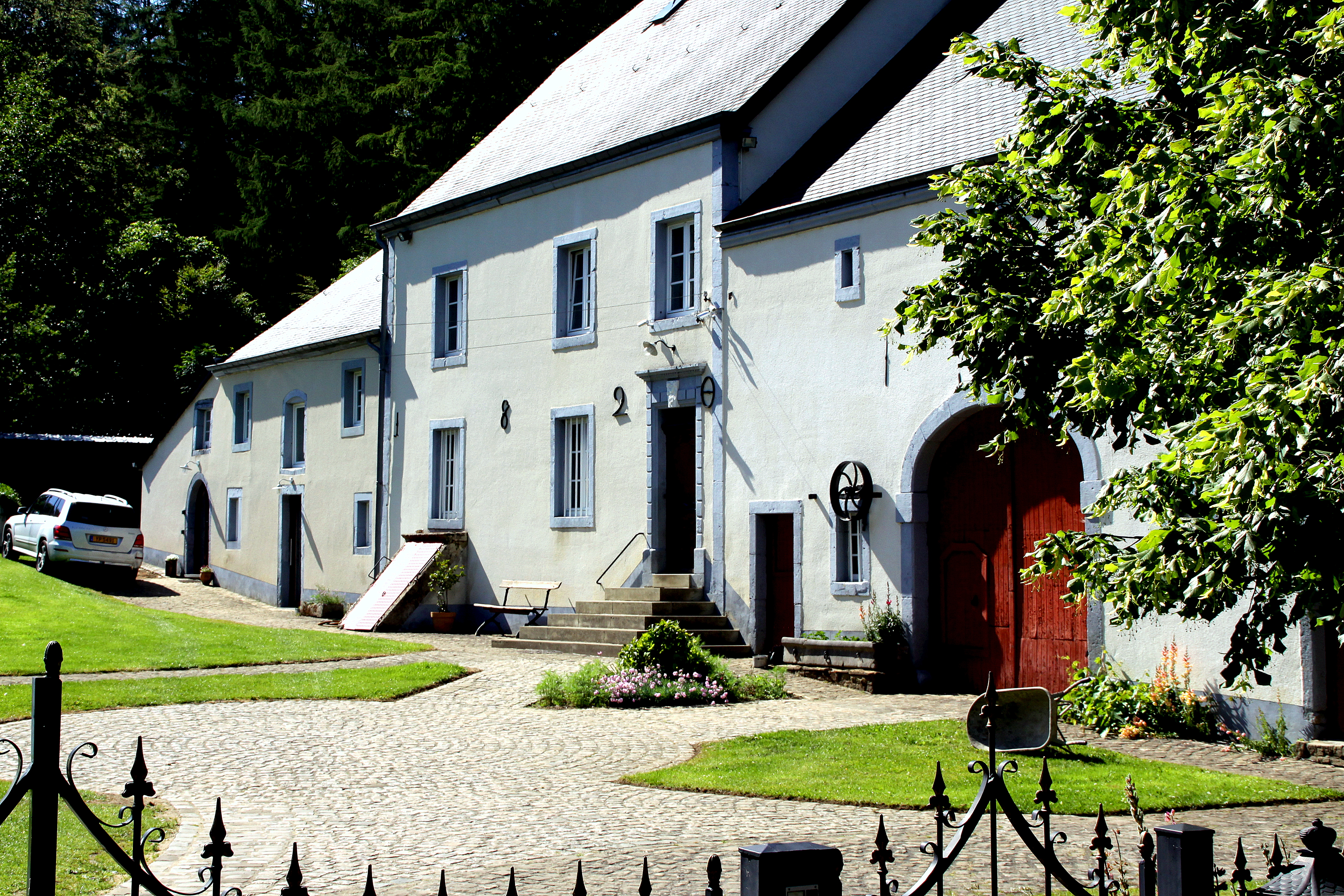

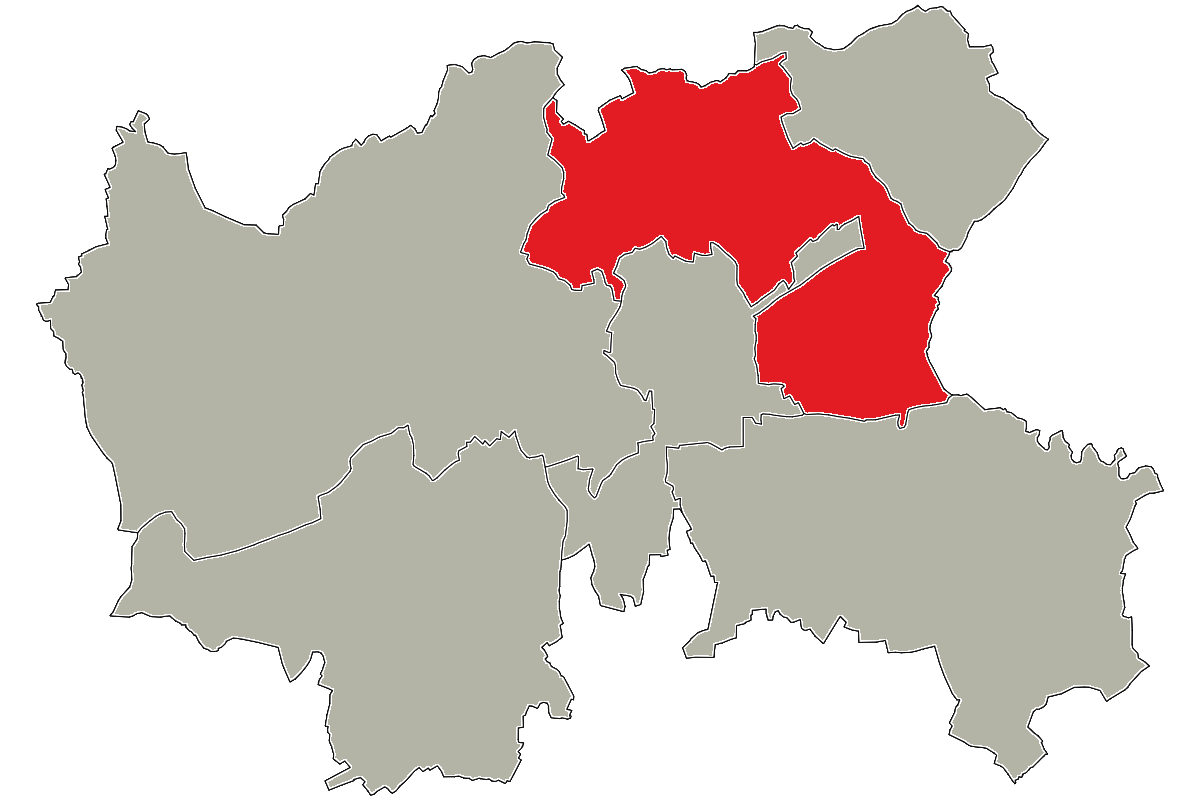
- Location of Bonnert in Arlon
- Interactive map of Bonnert
- Location within Belgium Location within Luxembourg (Belgium)
- Coordinates: 49°42′01″N 5°49′00″E
- Country: Belgium
- Community: French Community
- Region: Wallonia
- Province: Luxembourg
- Arrondissement: Arlon
- Municipality: Arlon

Area
  - Total: 17.81 km^{2} (6.88 sq mi)

Population (2020-01-01)
  - Total: 4,814
  - Density: 270.3/km^{2} (700.1/sq mi)
- Postal codes: 6700
- Area codes: 063

Bonnert (French pronunciation: [bɔnεʁt]; Luxembourgish: Bunnert) is a sub-municipality of the city of Arlon located in the province of Luxembourg, Wallonia, Belgium. It was a separate municipality until 1977. On 1 January 1977, it was merged into Arlon.
