= Jean-Marie Gaspar =

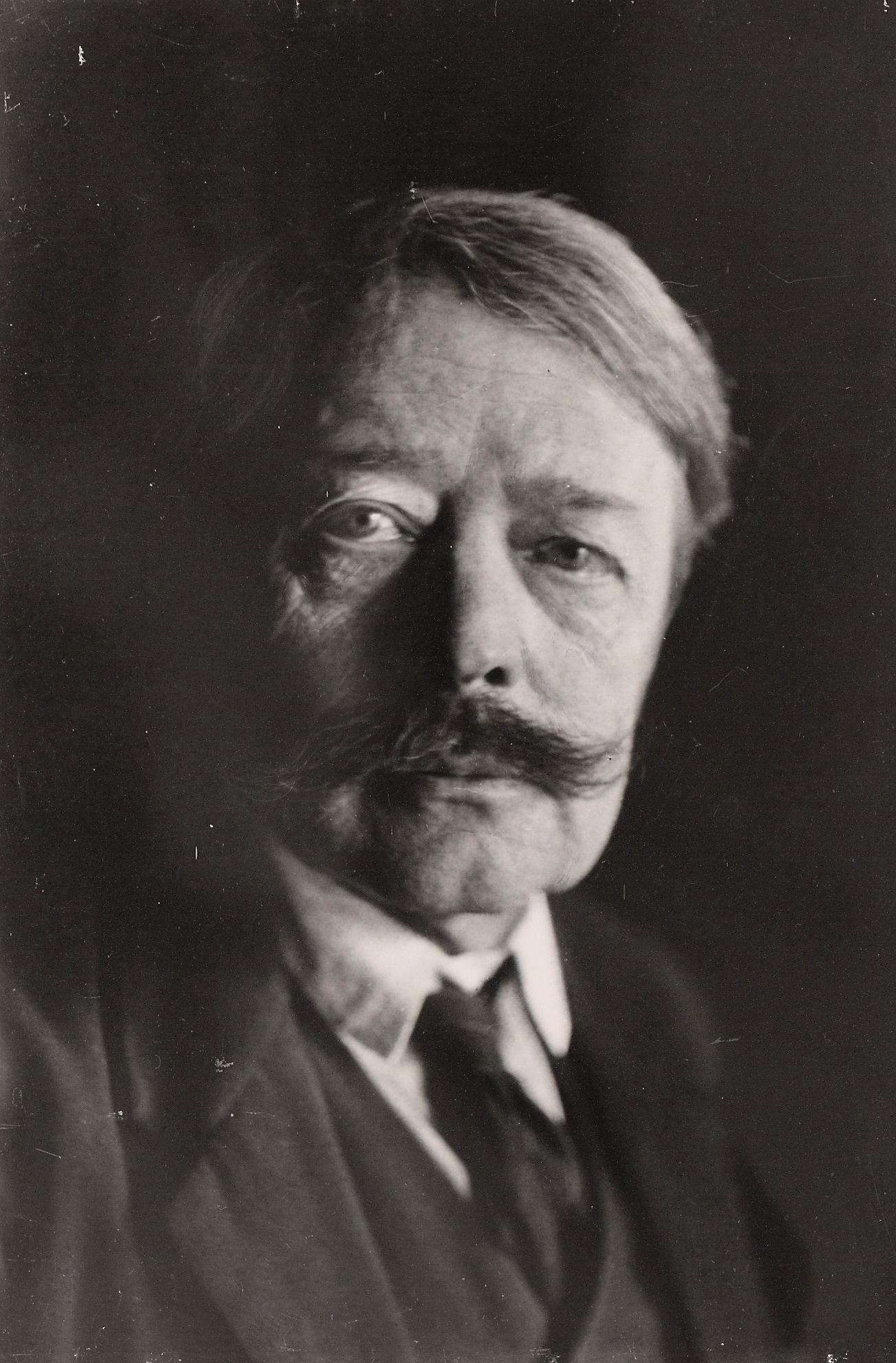
Jean Gaspar

Jean-Marie Gaspar, usually called only Jean Gaspar (1861–1931) was a Belgian sculptor.

== Biography ==
Jean Gaspar was born in Arlon, in the Luxembourg province of Belgium. He studied engineering in Liège before deciding to become a sculptor where he was taught sculpting by Jef Lambeaux. He specialised in sculptures depicting animals, including exotic animals which he observed at Antwerp Zoo. Among his works are a sculpture of a deer and a monument commemorating the dead of World War I which are in his hometown Arlon. Several of his works are also part of the collections of the Royal Museums of Fine Arts of Belgium in Brussels. In Arlon, the Gaspar Museum is devoted to his work, life, and that of his brother Charles who was a photographer. Jean Gaspar died in Brussels.
