= Toernich =

Section of Arlon, Wallonia, Belgium

Toernich Täernech (Luxembourgish) Törnich (German)
- Sub-municipality of Arlon
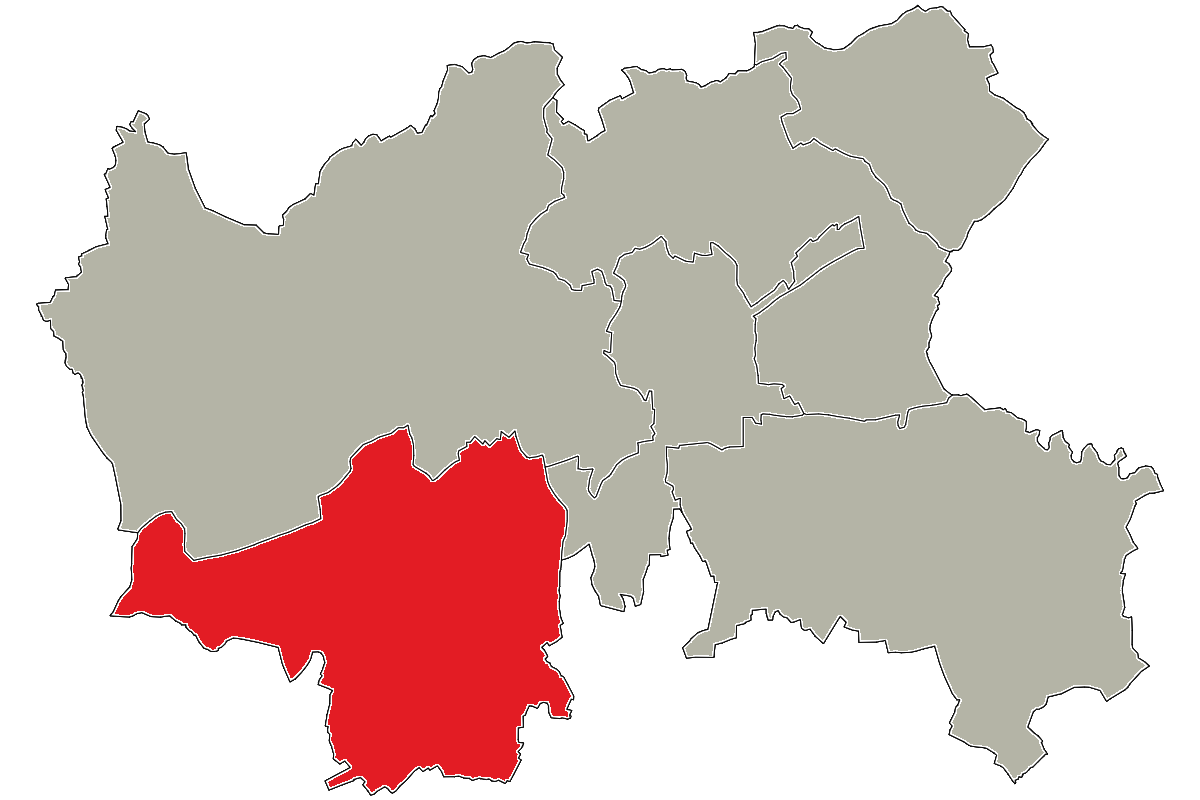
- Location of Toernich in Arlon
- Interactive map of Toernich
- Location within Belgium Location within Luxembourg (Belgium)
- Coordinates: 49°39′06″N 5°46′42″E
- Country: Belgium
- Community: French Community
- Region: Wallonia
- Province: Luxembourg
- Arrondissement: Arlon
- Municipality: Arlon

Area
  - Total: 20.77 km^{2} (8.02 sq mi)

Population (2020-01-01)
  - Total: 1,009
  - Density: 48.58/km^{2} (125.8/sq mi)
- Postal codes: 6700
- Area codes: 063

Toernich (French pronunciation: [tœʁniʃ]; Luxembourgish: Täernech; German: Törnich) is a sub-municipality of the city of Arlon located in the province of Luxembourg, Wallonia, Belgium. It was a separate municipality until 1977. On 1 January 1977, it was merged into Arlon.
