= St Martin's Church, Arlon =

St Martin's Church
- French: Église Saint-Martin
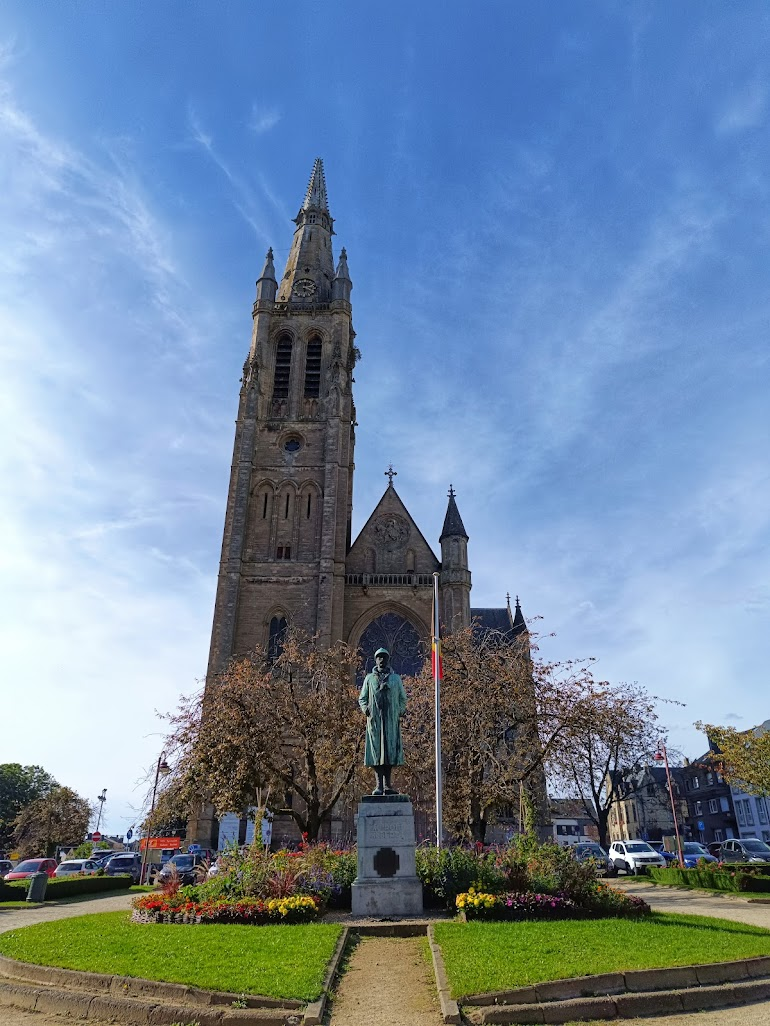
- St Martin's Church in Arlon
- St Martin's Church
- 48°40′57.421″N 5°48′33.779″E
- Location: Arlon
- Country: Belgium
- Denomination: Catholic

History
- Dedication: Saint Martin

Architecture
- Architect(s): Edouard Van Gheluwe; Modeste de Noyette
- Style: Gothic Revival
- Completed: 1914

Administration
- Diocese: Roman Catholic Diocese of Namur

St Martin's Church or the Church of St. Martin (French: Église Saint-Martin) is a church located in Arlon, Luxembourg, Belgium.

== History ==
The church's origins trace back to an ancient Church of St. Martin, founded to honor Saint Martin in Arlon.

Built over seven years, St Martin's Church was inaugurated in 1914. It was designed by the architects Edouard Van Gheluwe and Modeste de Noyette.

== Gallery ==
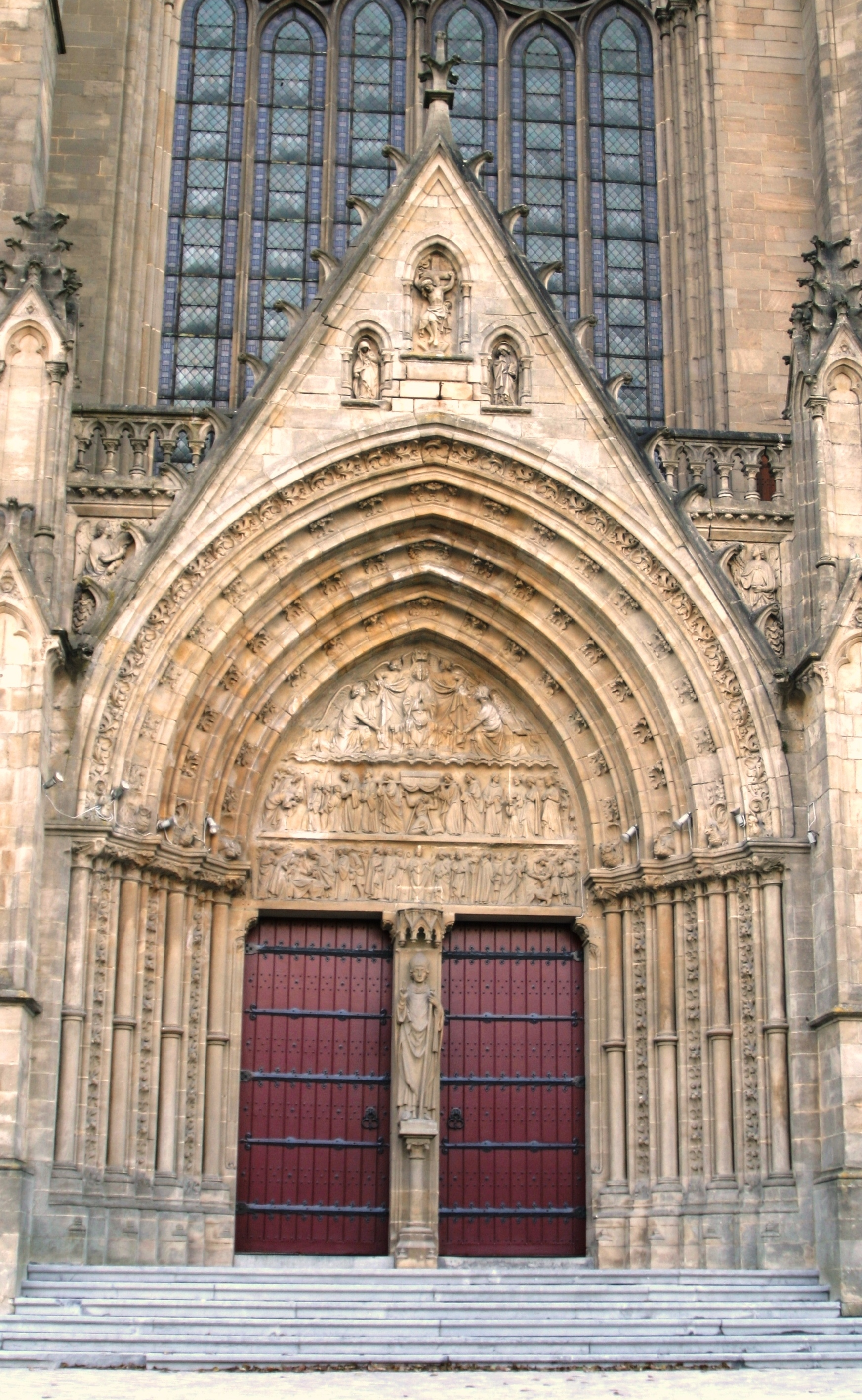
Main portal

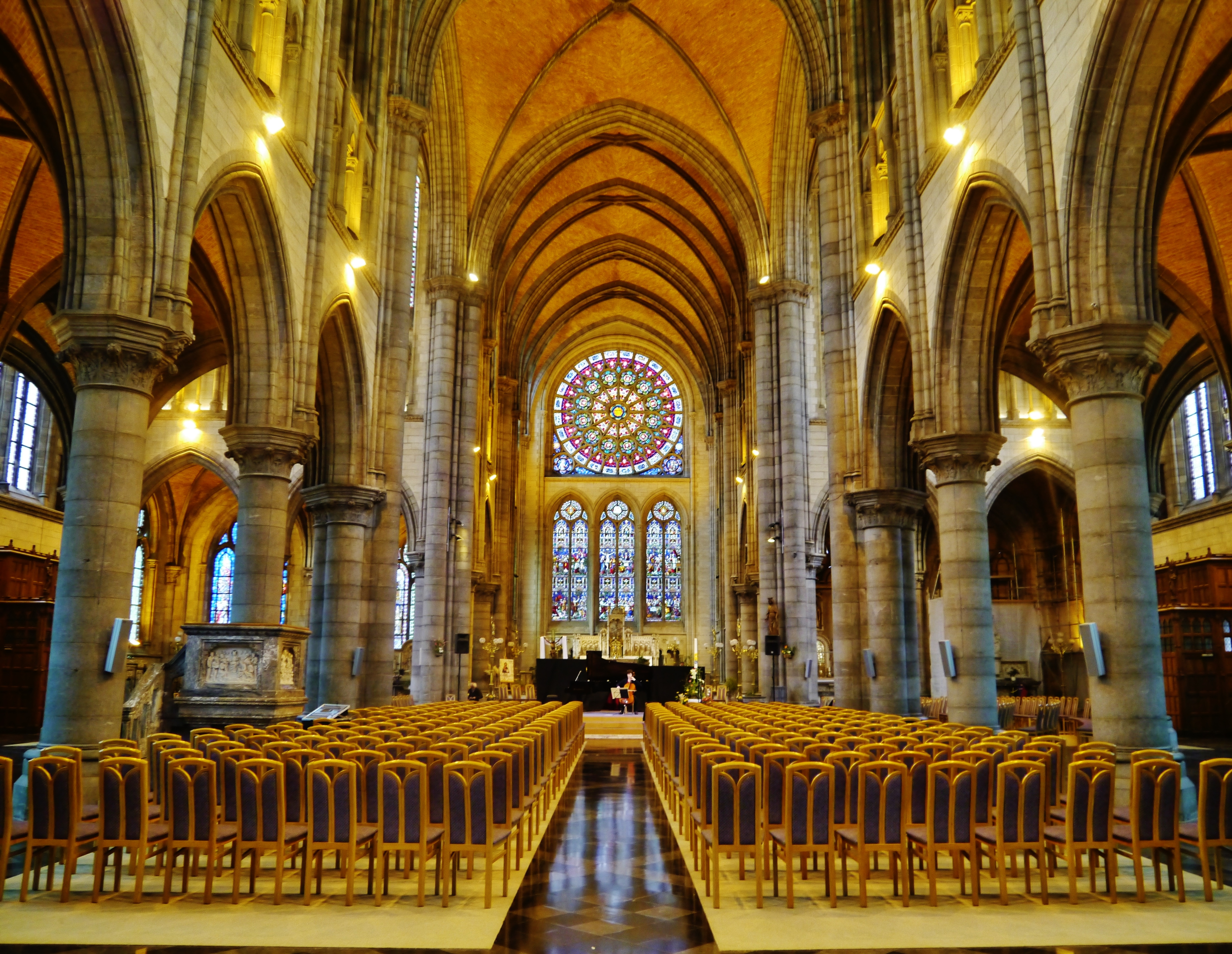
Nave

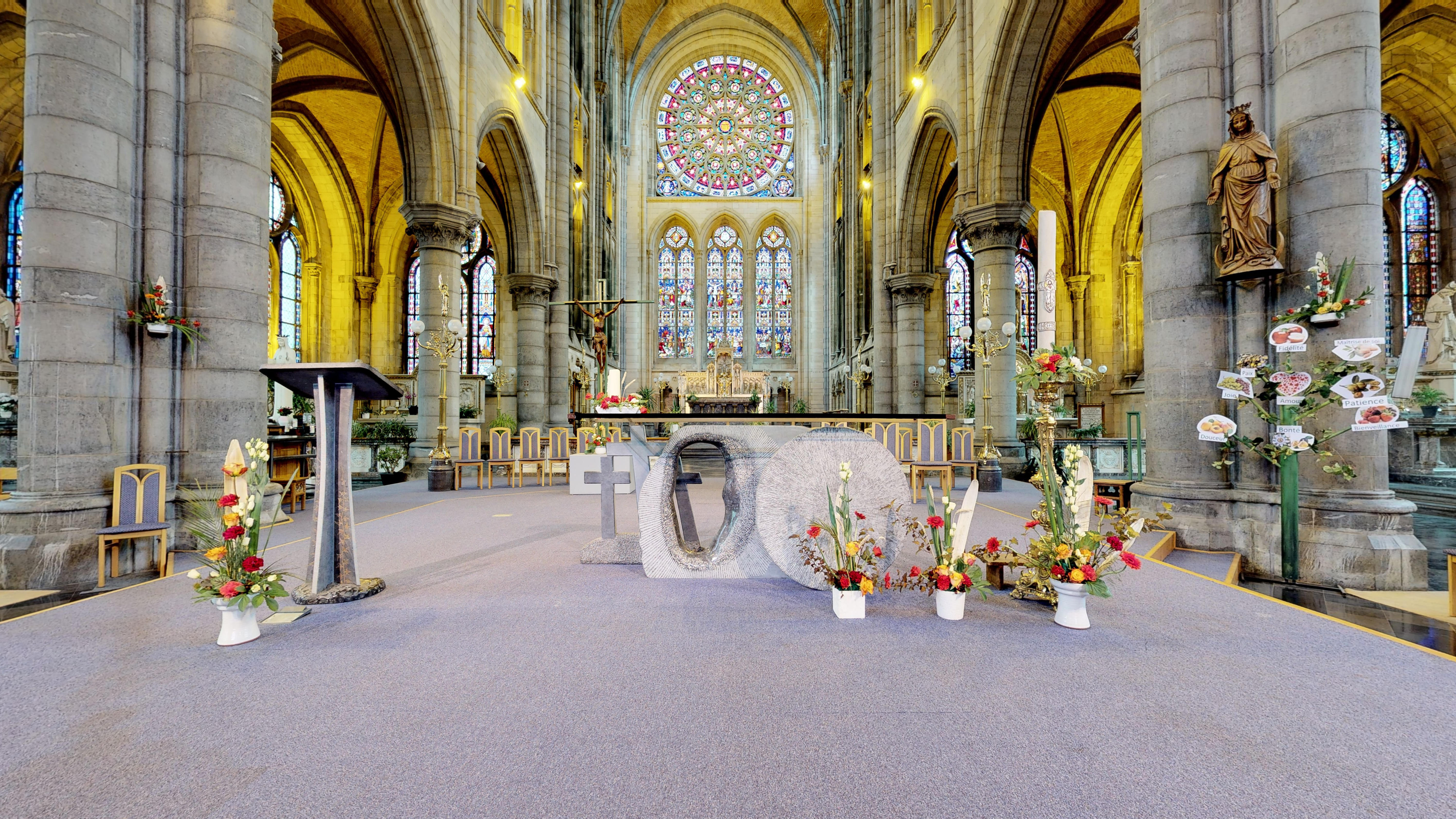
Interior
