= Joseph Netzer =

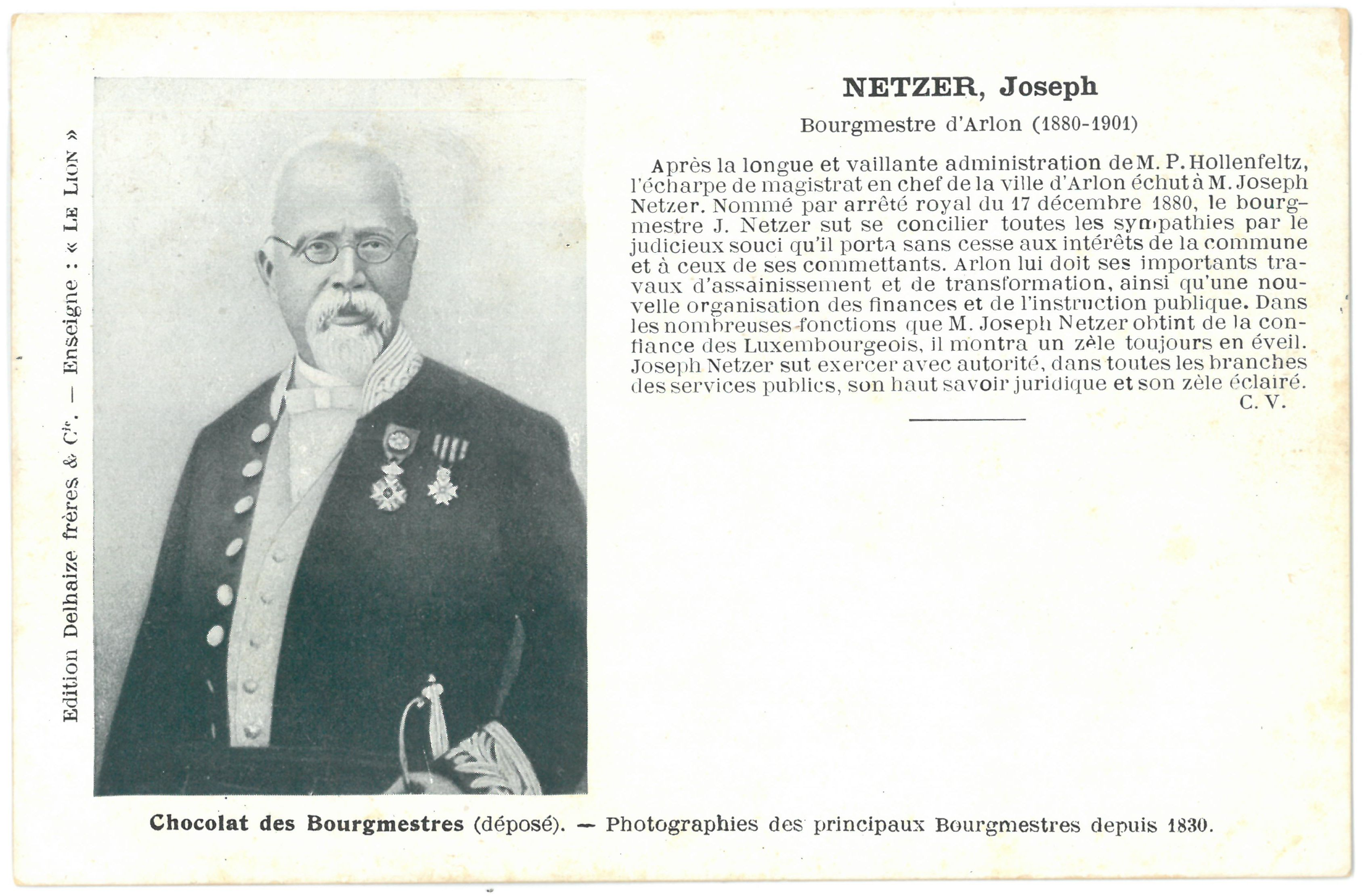
Joseph Netzer

Joseph Netzer (born 20 February 1826 in Martelange; died 21 June 1901 in Arlon) was mayor of Arlon from 1880 until 1901. He was married to Élisabeth Delrez and the father of 6 children.

During his term the city hall on Rue Paul Reuter was thoroughly renovated. It was originally designed by Albert-Jean-Baptiste Jamot and had served as a boarding school from 1843 until 1896. On 29 September 1898 Netzer presided the council for the first time in the new city hall.

A street in Arlon was named after him.

He was buried in the Jewish section of the cemetery of Arlon.
