= Tontelange =

Tontelange Tontel (Luxembourgish)
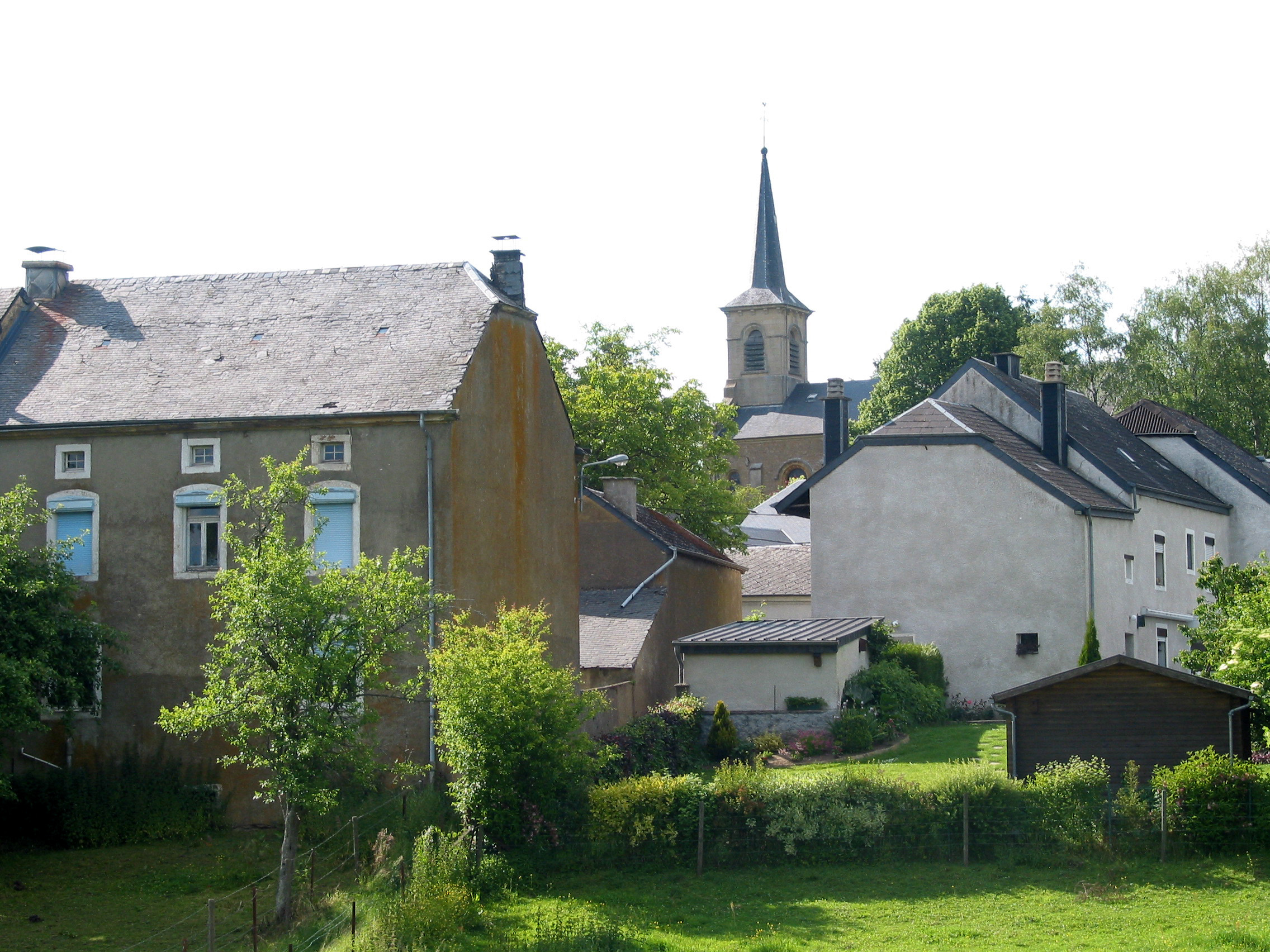
- Tontelange

- Location within Belgium Location within Europe
- Coordinates: 49°43′30″N 05°48′35″E
- Country: Belgium
- Region: Wallonia
- Province: Luxembourg
- Municipality: Attert

Tontelange (French pronunciation: [tɔ̃tlɑ̃ʒ], German: Tontelingen; Luxembourgish: Tontel; Walloon: Tontlindje) is a village of Wallonia and a district of the municipality of Attert, located in the province of Luxembourg, Belgium.

The village is mentioned in written sources in 968 as "Dotlinga". In 1865, it was separated into a municipality of its own, but later merged with several other municipalities into the present municipality of Attert.
