= Arlon =

Capital of Luxembourg province, Wallonia, Belgium

Arlon Arel (Luxembourgish): Aarlen (Dutch)
- City and municipality
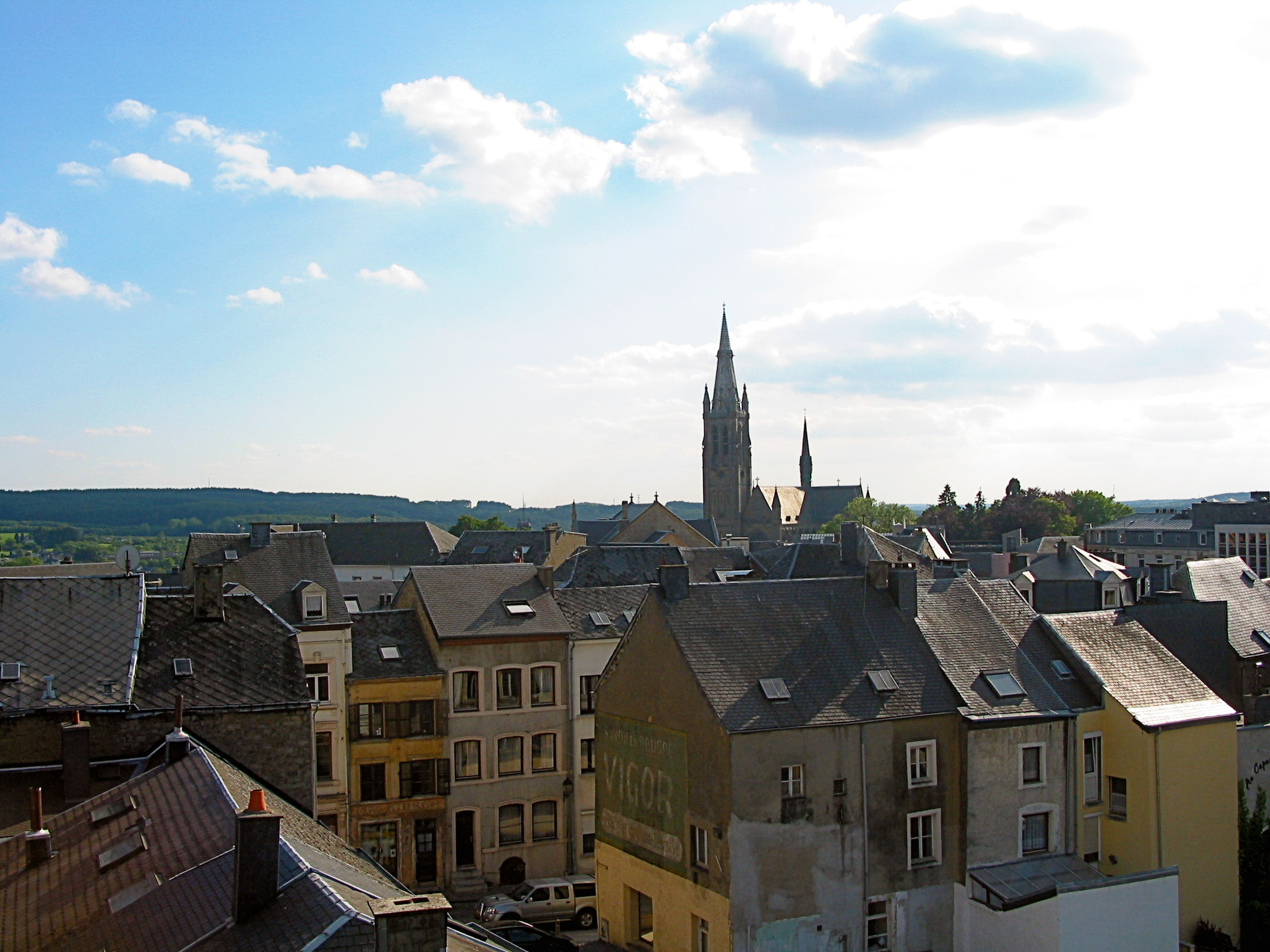
- Arlon centre with bell tower of St. Martin's Church

- Flag Coat of arms

- Location of Arlon in Luxembourg province
- Interactive map of Arlon
- Location in Belgium
- Coordinates: 49°41′N 05°49′E
- Country: Belgium
- Community: French Community
- Region: Wallonia
- Province: Luxembourg
- Arrondissement: Arlon

Government
  - Mayor: Vincent Magnus (cdH, ARLON 2030)
  - Governing party: MR-ARLON 2030

Area
  - Total: 119.06 km^{2} (45.97 sq mi)

Population (2022-01-01)
  - Total: 30,818
  - Density: 258.84/km^{2} (670.40/sq mi)
- Postal codes: 6700, 6704, 6706
- NIS code: 81001
- Area codes: 063
- Website: www.arlon.be (in French)

Arlon (French pronunciation: [aʁlɔ̃]; Walloon: Årlon; Dutch: Aarlen [ˈaːrlə(n)]; Luxembourgish: Arel [ˈaːʀəl]) is a city and municipality of Wallonia, and the capital of the province of Luxembourg in Belgium. With a population of just over 28,000, it is the smallest provincial capital in Belgium. Arlon is also the capital of its cultural region: the Arelerland (Land of Arlon in Luxembourgish).

The municipality consists of the following sub-municipalities: Arlon proper, Autelbas, Bonnert, Guirsch, Heinsch, and Toernich. Other population centers include: Autelhaut, Clairefontaine, Fouches, Frassem, Freylange, Hachy, Heckbous, Rosenberg, Sampont, Schoppach, Sesselich, Seymerich, Stehnen, Sterpenich, Stockem, Udange, Viville, Waltzing, Weyler, and Wolberg.

== History ==
=== Origins ===
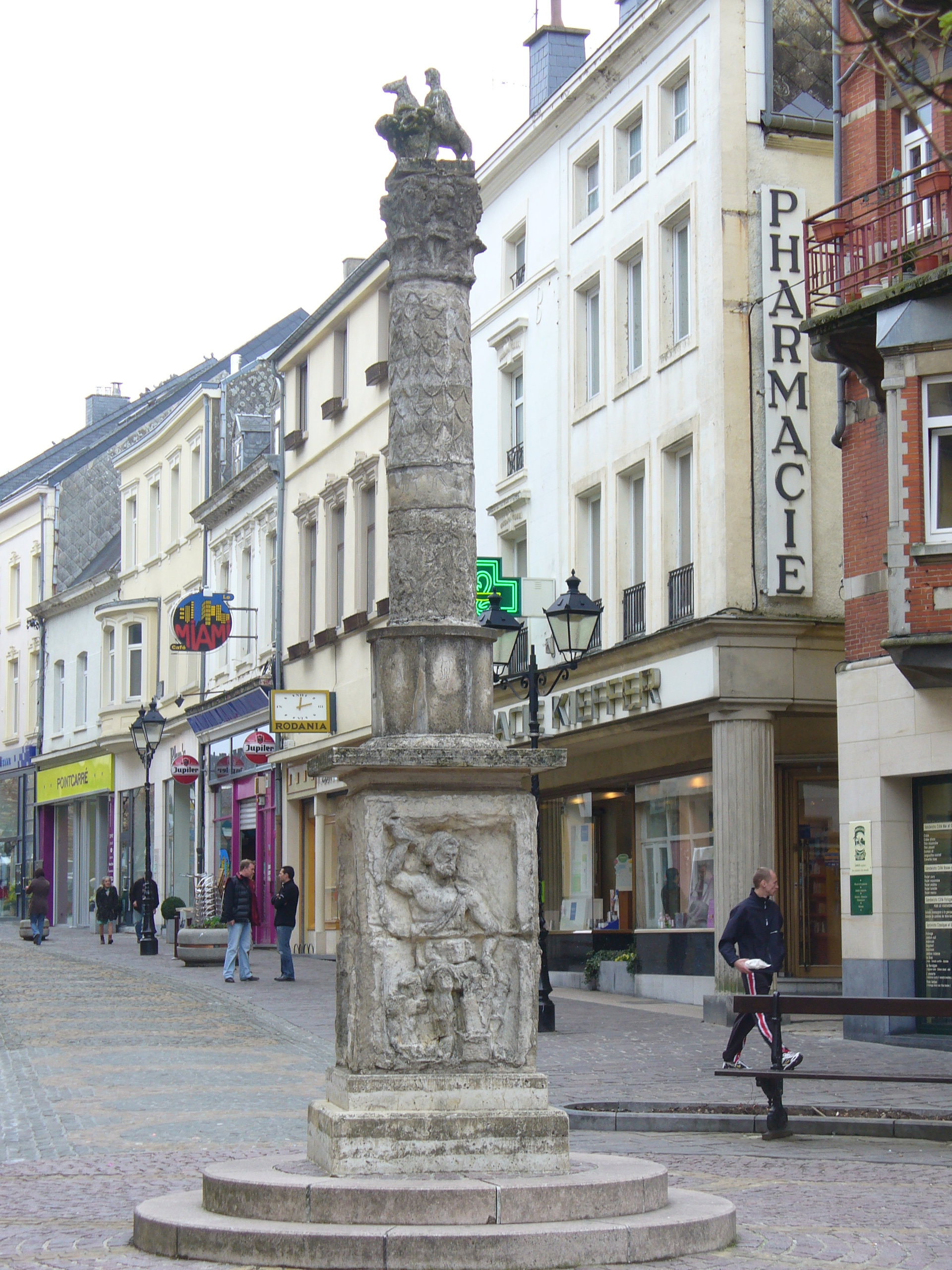
Gallo-Roman column of Jupiter in the Grand rue

Before the Roman conquests of Gaul, the territory of Arlon and a vast area to the southeast were settled by the Treveri, a Celtic tribe. The local population adapted relatively easily to Roman culture. The number and quality of sculpted stones and monuments that have been unearthed in the area demonstrate that the vicus of Orolaunum quickly became a commercial and administrative centre of Roman civilization. The Germanic invasions of the 3rd century destroyed most of these early advances, despite the defensive walls that had been built on the Knipchen hill to protect the vicus.

=== Middle Ages ===
During most of the Middle Ages, the population still used the earlier buildings such as the thermae. In 1060, Waleran I of Limburg, Count of Arlon, built a castle on the Knipchen hill in the centre of the town.

A dynasty of counts of Arlon began with Waleran I, Duke of Limburg. On the death of Duke Waleran III in 1226, Arlon passed to his son from the second marriage, Henry V the Fair, Count of Luxembourg, and became part of the county of Luxembourg. Thus, in the Tournament of Chauvency, his son Henry the Lion bore the title of Marquis of Arlon.

In the 13th century, the only women's Cistercian abbey known to date was built in Clairefontaine.

=== 15th–18th centuries ===
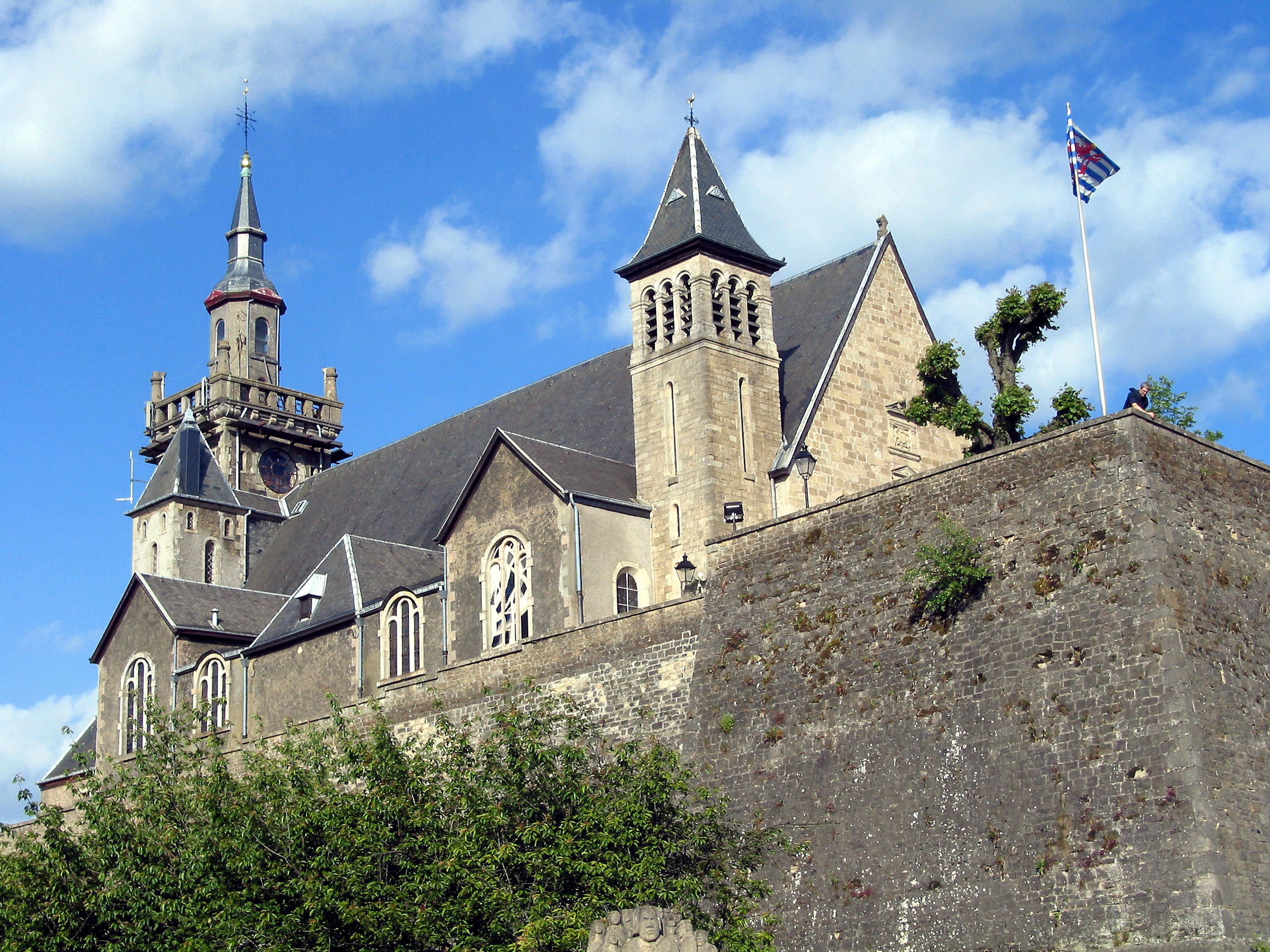
St Donat's church, Arlon

The Duchy of Luxembourg itself, of which Arlon was dependent, became part of the Burgundian Netherlands under Philip the Good in 1441. After Charles V's abdication of his empire to his son Philip II of Spain in 1556, a troubled period started for the whole region with continuous wars involving France, Spain and the Southern Netherlands. In 1558, nearly half of the city, including its castle, was destroyed by the French troops of Francis, Duke of Guise.

In the 17th century, Capuchin friars built a convent on the ruins of the castle and the French strengthened the defensive walls according to Vauban's designs. An accidental fire destroyed a large part of the city again in 1785.

On 9 June 1793, the French Revolutionary troops opposed the Austrians just outside Arlon. The French emerged victorious and took over the city from Austrian rule. They expelled the Capuchin friars and used their convent as a hospital.

=== 19th and 20th centuries ===
In June 1815, after the defeat of Napoleon in the Battle of Waterloo, Arlon went back to government of the Duchy of Luxembourg. By the Treaty of London in 1839, the Duchy became fully sovereign as Grand Duchy and in turn the geographically larger western part of the duchy, i.e. the province de Luxembourg including Arlon city was given to newly created Kingdom of Belgium.

Arlon was one of the first victims of the German invasion in 1914 as 121 inhabitants were executed on 26 August, on the orders of Colonel Richard Karl von Tessmar.

Its territory was again among the first to be invaded at the onset of World War II. Allies moved into Belgium on 10 May 1940 and Arlon was defended by French troops, but they were not able to stop the German invasion.

=== Arlon today ===
Being situated very close to the border with the Grand Duchy of Luxembourg, Arlon has continued to expand with new residential areas and commercial development zones, and many people cross the border everyday to work in the Grand Duchy. All international express trains make a stop in Arlon, as it is the last station on the main Brussels—Luxembourg City railway line.

== Sights ==
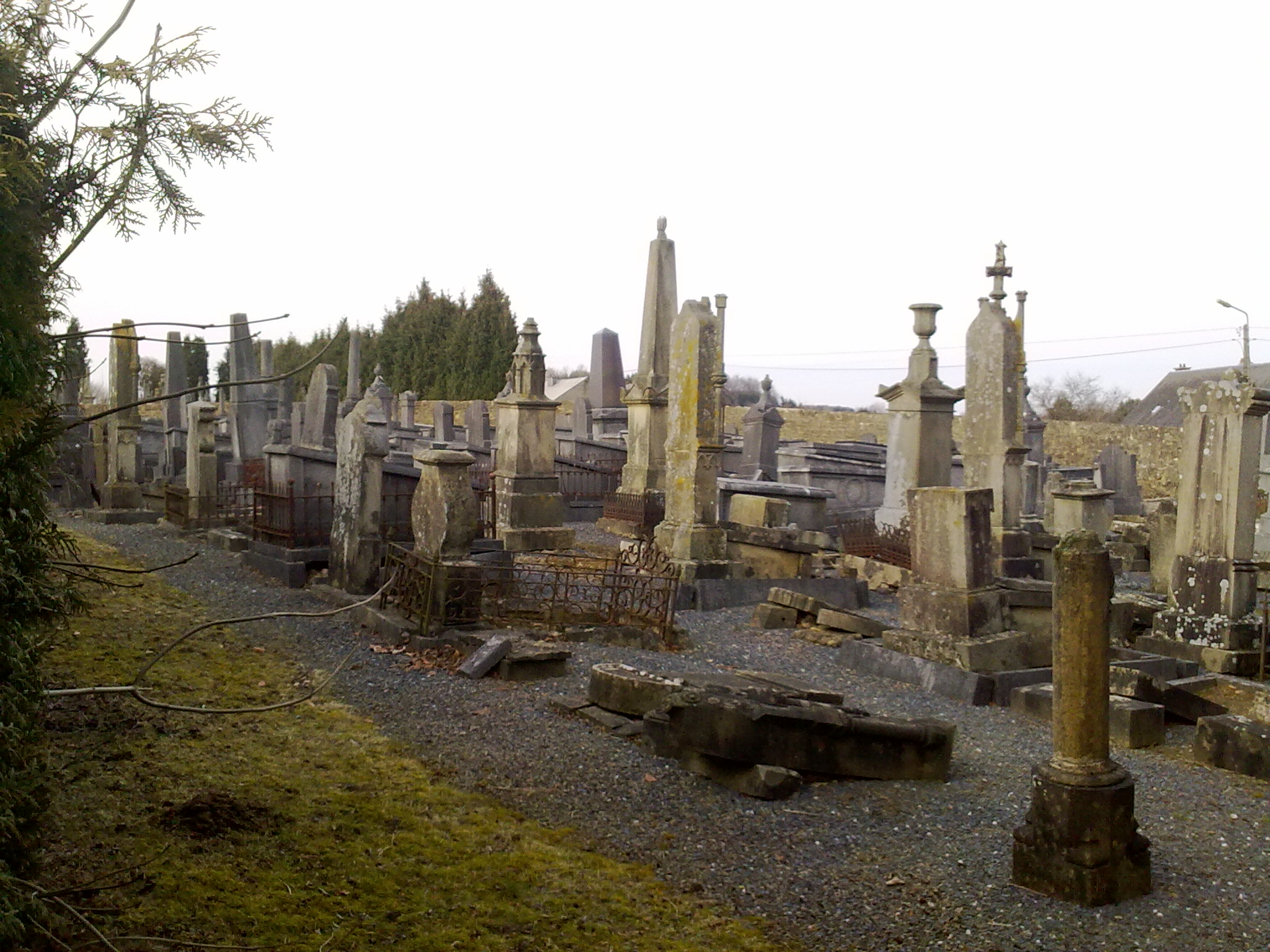
The Jewish cemetery

- Arlon is best known for holding one of the richest archeological museums in Belgium. It houses numerous examples of Roman sculpture and Merovingian funerary art.
- A fragment of the Gallo-Roman defensive wall that was built in the 3rd century still stands in Arlon.
- The Gaspar Museum is dedicated to the art of Jean-Marie Gaspar and Charles Gaspar, and also holds a collection of regional art including the Fisenne altarpiece, an altarpiece from the 16th century originally located in the village Fisenne.
- Saint Donat's church now stands on the Knipchen hill, where Waleran I of Limburg once built his castle and the Capuchin friars built their convent.
- Arlon cemetery has the largest Jewish section of all Walloon cemeteries.

== Local customs ==
- The carnival of Arlon takes place at mid-Lent. It includes the traditional handing of the city keys to the carnival prince and a colourful parade composed of various folk dance groups.
- The Maitrank (German for "drink of May") is the city's most popular refreshment. It is made of white wine in which a local flower, the Asperula odorata, has macerated. Some recipes also add cognac or substitute woodruff for the Asperula. The Maitrank festivities take place in the city every fourth Sunday of May.

== Climate ==
Climate data for Arlon(1991-2020)
| Month | Jan | Feb | Mar | Apr | May | Jun | Jul | Aug | Sep | Oct | Nov | Dec | Year |
|---|---|---|---|---|---|---|---|---|---|---|---|---|---|
| Mean daily maximum °C (°F) | 4.0 (39.2) | 5.3 (41.5) | 9.7 (49.5) | 14.1 (57.4) | 18.0 (64.4) | 21.2 (70.2) | 23.3 (73.9) | 22.9 (73.2) | 18.7 (65.7) | 13.4 (56.1) | 7.8 (46.0) | 4.6 (40.3) | 13.6 (56.5) |
| Daily mean °C (°F) | 1.4 (34.5) | 1.9 (35.4) | 5.2 (41.4) | 8.6 (47.5) | 12.6 (54.7) | 15.8 (60.4) | 17.8 (64.0) | 17.3 (63.1) | 13.5 (56.3) | 9.5 (49.1) | 5.1 (41.2) | 2.2 (36.0) | 9.2 (48.6) |
| Mean daily minimum °C (°F) | −1.3 (29.7) | −1.5 (29.3) | 0.7 (33.3) | 3.1 (37.6) | 7.1 (44.8) | 10.4 (50.7) | 12.2 (54.0) | 11.8 (53.2) | 8.4 (47.1) | 5.6 (42.1) | 2.4 (36.3) | −0.3 (31.5) | 4.9 (40.8) |
| Average precipitation mm (inches) | 121.4 (4.78) | 93.5 (3.68) | 80.3 (3.16) | 63.1 (2.48) | 75.7 (2.98) | 79.4 (3.13) | 79.4 (3.13) | 82.8 (3.26) | 78.2 (3.08) | 100.5 (3.96) | 103.9 (4.09) | 146.9 (5.78) | 1,105.1 (43.51) |
| Average precipitation days (≥ 1.0 mm) | 14.3 | 12.6 | 11.9 | 9.7 | 10.9 | 10.2 | 10.8 | 10.5 | 10.0 | 12.2 | 14.2 | 15.8 | 143.1 |
| Mean monthly sunshine hours | 49 | 73 | 132 | 196 | 208 | 222 | 234 | 214 | 162 | 103 | 49 | 41 | 1,683 |
| Mean daily sunshine hours | 1.6 | 2.6 | 4.3 | 6.2 | 6.7 | 7.4 | 7.6 | 6.9 | 5.4 | 3.3 | 1.6 | 1.3 | 4.6 |
Source: KMI

== Demography ==
The town of Arlon is the most populated of the municipalities in the province of Luxembourg, ahead of Marche-en-Famenne and Aubange. On the other hand, it is the least populated of the country's ten provinces. On 31 December 2019, the city of Arlon had a total population of 30,047 inhabitants.

| Group of origin | Year | | Year | | Year | | Year | |
| Group of origin | 2000 | | 2010 | | 2020 | | 2026 | |
| Group of origin | Number | % | Number | % | Number | % | Number | % |
| Belgians with Belgian background | 20,732 | 83.6 | 20,376 | 73,4 | 18,656 | 62 | 16,771 | 53,3 |
| Belgians with foreign background | 2,273 | 9.2 | 4,267 | 15,4 | 6,232 | 20,7 | 7,251 | 23,1 |
|---|---|---|---|---|---|---|---|---|
| Neighboring country | 1,140 | 4.59 | 1,590 | 5.72 | 1,829 | 6,08 | 1,967 | 6,25 |
| EU27 (excluding neighboring country) | 633 | 2.55 | 1,015 | 3,65 | 1,360 | 4,52 | 1,425 | 4,53 |
| Outside EU 27 | 500 | 2.01 | 1,662 | 5,98 | 3,043 | 10,11 | 3,859 | 12,27 |
| Non-Belgians | 1,786 | 7.2 | 3,120 | 11.2 | 5,193 | 17,3 | 7,418 | 23,6 |
| Neighboring country | 912 | 3,67 | 1,432 | 5,15 | 1,912 | 6,35 | 2,281 | 7,25 |
| EU27 (excluding neighboring country) | 575 | 2,31 | 990 | 3,56 | 2,132 | 7,08 | 3,326 | 10,57 |
| Outside EU 27 | 299 | 1,20 | 694 | 2,50 | 1,149 | 3,81 | 1,811 | 5,76 |
| Total | 24,793 | 100 | 27,763 | 100 | 30,081 | 100 | 31,440 | 100 |

== Transport ==
The nearest airport is Luxembourg Airport, which is located 47 km (29 mi) south east of Arlon, in the neighbouring country of Luxembourg. Other nearby major airports include Charleroi Airport, located 161 km (100 mi) northwest and Brussels Airport, located 190 km (118 mi) northwest both serving as convenient options for travel to and from the region.

== Politics ==
List of mayors:

- Pierre Hollenfeltz
- 1880–1901: Joseph Netzer
- 1901–1921: Numa Ensch-Tesch
- 1921–1949: Paul Reuter
- 1949–1958: Jules Massonnet
- 1958–1976: Charles Simon
- 1977–1988: Jean Goffinet
- 1989–1992: Guy Larcier
- 1993–1994: Jean Goffinet
- 1995–2006: Guy Larcier
- 2007–2012: Raymond Biren
- 2013–...: Vincent Magnus

== People born in Arlon ==
- Jeroen van Busleyden, humanist (1470–1517)
- Johann Kaspar Basselet von La Rosée, Bavarian general (1710–1795)
- Godefroid Kurth, historian (1847–1916)
- Jean-Marie Gaspar, sculptor (1861–1931)
- Benoît Lamy, film director (1945–2008)
- Ingrid Lempereur, swimmer (1969)
- Anthony Moris, Luxembourgish footballer (1990)
- Timothy Castagne, Belgian footballer (1995)
- Norman Bassette, Belgian footballer (2004)

== Twin towns – sister cities ==
Arlon is twinned with:

- Saint-Dié-des-Vosges, France since 1962
- Diekirch, Luxembourg
- Bitburg, Rhineland-Palatinate, Germany since 1965
- Sulphur, Louisiana, United States
- Hayange, France
- Alba, Italy since 1 March 2004
- (United Kingdom) Market Drayton, England, UK

== See also ==
- List of protected heritage sites in Arlon
