= Arrondissement of Arlon =

Arrondissement in Wallonia, Belgium

Arrondissement of Arlon Arrondissement d'Arlon
- Arrondissement
- Location of the arrondissement in Luxembourg
- Coordinates: 49.7°N 5.8°E
- Country: Belgium
- Region: Wallonia
- Province: Luxembourg
- Municipalities: 5

Area
  - Total: 317.28 km^{2} (122.50 sq mi)

Population (1 January 2017)
  - Total: 61,899
  - Density: 195.09/km^{2} (505.29/sq mi)
- Time zone: UTC+1 (CET)
  - Summer (DST): UTC+2 (CEST)

The Arrondissement of Arlon (French: Arrondissement d'Arlon; Dutch: Arrondissement Aarlen; German: Bezirk Arlon) is one of the five administrative arrondissements in the Walloon province of Luxembourg, Belgium. It is an administrative arrondissement not to be confused with the exctint judicial arrondissement of Arlon, also comprising the municipalities of the Arrondissement of Virton.

== Municipalities ==
The Administrative Arrondissement of Arlon consists of the following municipalities:

- Arlon
- Attert
- Aubange
- Martelange
- Messancy

== See also ==
- Arelerland
