= Hubert Pierlot =

Prime Minister of Belgium from 1939 to 1945

Count Hubert Pierlot
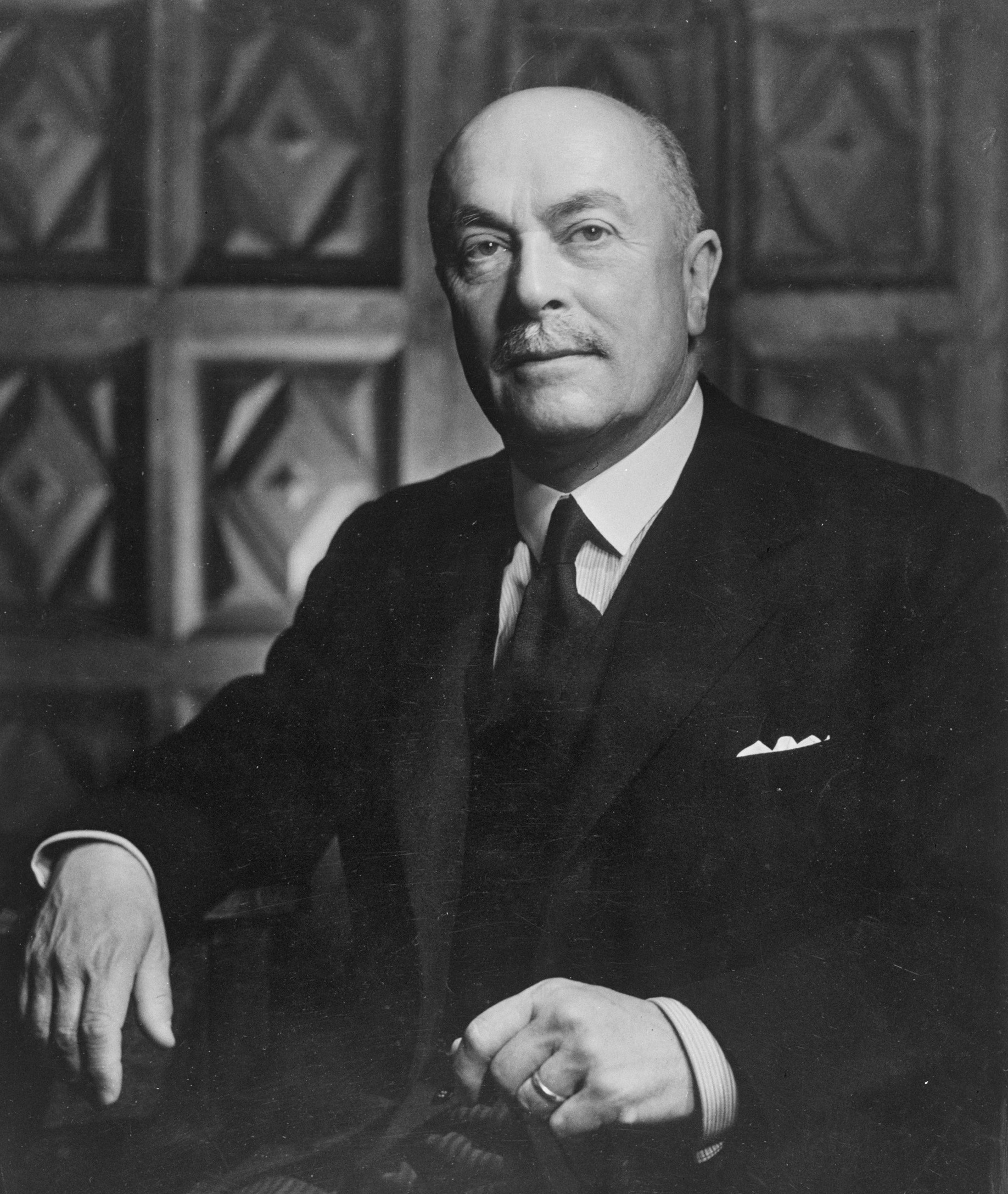
- Pierlot in 1943

Prime Minister of Belgium
- In office 22 February 1939 – 12 February 1945
- Monarch: Leopold III
- Regent: Prince Charles (1944–45)
- Preceded by: Paul-Henri Spaak
- Succeeded by: Achille Van Acker

Personal details
- Born: 23 December 1883 Cugnon, Luxembourg Province, Belgium
- Died: 13 December 1963 (aged 79) Uccle, Brussels, Belgium
- Party: Catholic Party; Christian Social Party
- Education: Catholic University of Louvain (Lic.)

Military service
- Allegiance: Belgium
- Branch/service: Belgian Army
- Years of service: 1914–1918
- Rank: Lieutenant
- Unit: 20th Regiment of the Line
- Battles/wars: World War I; German invasion of Belgium; Battle of the Yser

Count Hubert Marie Eugène Pierlot (pronounced [ybɛʁ maʁi øʒɛn pjɛʁlo], 23 December 1883 – 13 December 1963) was a Belgian politician and Prime Minister of Belgium, serving between 1939 and 1945. Pierlot, a lawyer and jurist, served in World War I before entering politics in the 1920s. A member of the Catholic Party, Pierlot became Prime Minister in 1939, shortly before Belgium entered World War II. In this capacity, he headed the Belgian government in exile, first from France and later Britain, while Belgium was under German occupation.

During the German invasion of Belgium in May 1940, a violent disagreement broke out between Pierlot and King Leopold III over whether the King should follow the orders of his ministers and go into exile or surrender to the German Army. Pierlot considered Leopold's subsequent surrender a breach of the Constitution and encouraged the parliament to declare Leopold unfit to reign. The confrontation provoked a lasting animosity between Pierlot and other conservatives, who supported the King's position and considered the government's exile to be cowardly.

While in exile in London between 1940 and 1944, Pierlot served as both the prime minister of Belgium and minister of Defence and played an important role in wartime negotiations between the Allied powers, laying the foundation for Belgian post-war reconstruction. After the liberation of Belgium in September 1944, Pierlot returned to Brussels where, against his wishes, he headed a fresh government of national unity until February 1945. Criticism from the political left and the failure of the new government to deal with the serious issues facing the country following the liberation led to the fall of the government in February 1945 and he was replaced by the socialist Achille Van Acker. Pierlot's stance against Leopold III during the war made him a controversial figure during his lifetime and he was widely disliked in the same royalist and conservative circles from which his own Catholic Party (later the Christian Social Party) drew most of its support.

He retired from politics in 1946 amid the crisis of the Royal Question, surrounding whether Leopold could return to the Belgian throne, and died peacefully in 1963. After his death, Pierlot's reputation improved as the decisions he took during the war were reconsidered by historians.

== Birth and early career ==
Pierlot was born in Cugnon, a small village between Bertrix and Bouillon, in the Belgian Province of Luxembourg on 23 December 1883. His parents belonged to an eminent and wealthy Catholic family which was part of the Belgian conservative establishment. His brother, Jean Pierlot, would later become a member of the Belgian Resistance during the war and died in a German concentration camp in 1944.

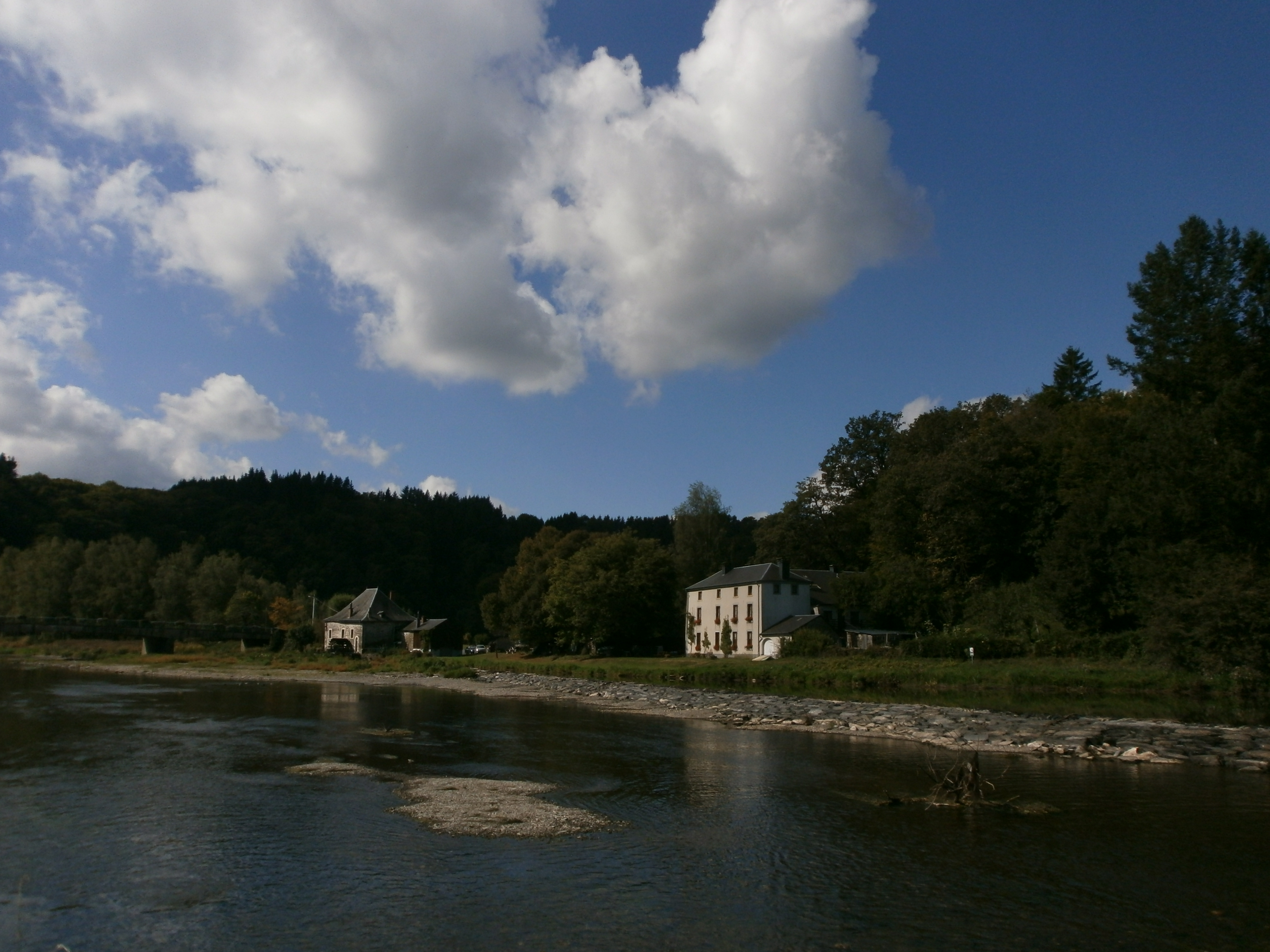
View of the village of Cugnon where Pierlot was born in 1883

Hubert Pierlot was educated in religious schools in Maredsous and later attended the prestigious Jesuit Collège Saint-Michel secondary school in Brussels. He studied at the Catholic University of Louvain where he received a licence in Political Science and a doctorate in Law. During his early life, he travelled to the United States, Canada and the United Kingdom. He later married Marie-Louise (née De Kinder) and had seven children. With the German invasion of Belgium in August 1914, he volunteered for the Belgian infantry as a private. He served at the Battle of the Yser and on the Yser Front where he was decorated for valour. By the end of the war, he had reached the rank of Lieutenant and was serving in the 20th Regiment of the Line.

After the war, Pierlot joined the Catholic Party (Parti catholique), the main centre-right party in Belgium and one of the three that dominated Belgian political life. The Catholic Party, which was considered the party of stability and the establishment, was extremely electorally successful during the interwar period and headed a series of coalition governments. On 23 December 1925, Pierlot entered parliament as a member of the Chamber of Deputies representing Neufchâteau-Virton but left just a week later to become a senator. He served as provincial senator for Luxembourg from 1926 to 1936 and as directly elected senator for the same province between 1936 and 1946. He received a reputation for his oratorical abilities and for personal sincerity during the late 1920s.

In the successive Catholic government of the interwar period, he served as the minister of Internal Affairs (1934–35), minister of Agriculture (1934–35; 1936–39), and minister of Foreign Affairs (1939). He first led a coalition of Catholics and Socialists, and then one of Catholics and Liberals.

== As Prime Minister ==
During the interwar period, Belgium pursued a policy of political neutrality and attempted to avoid confrontation with Nazi Germany. When the Phoney War broke out, Pierlot became the leader of a tripartite national government of Catholics, Liberals and Socialists which stayed in power until the German invasion in May 1940.

=== Break with Leopold III ===
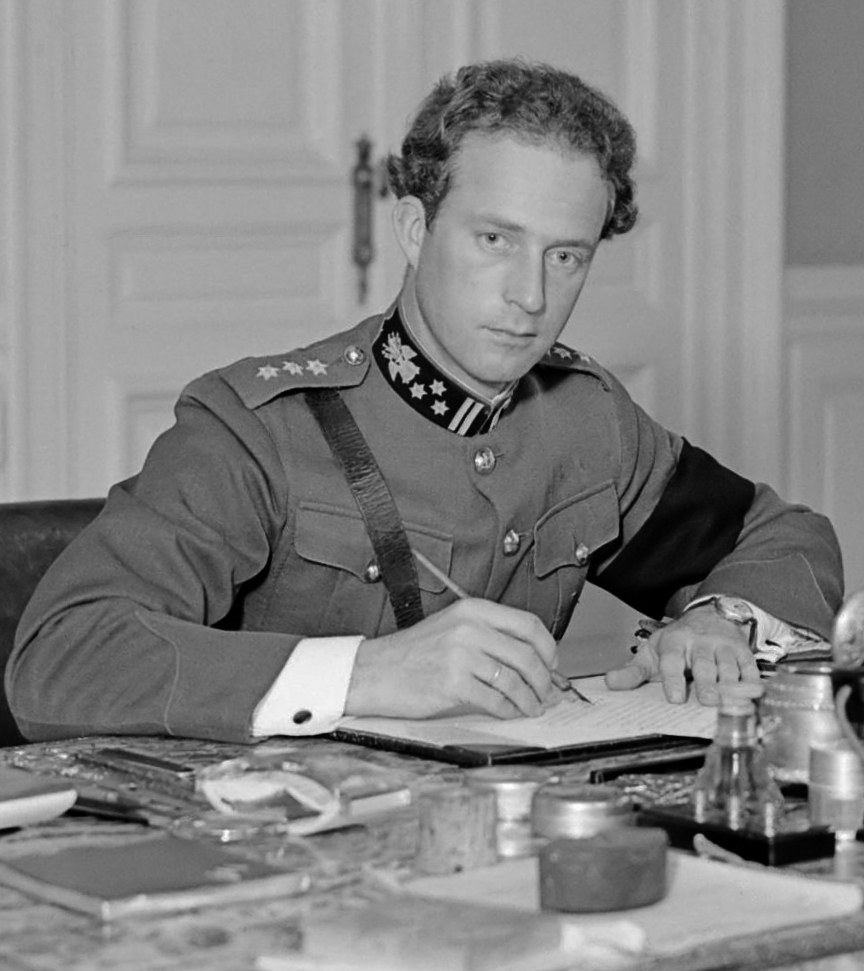
The break between Pierlot and King Leopold III (pictured) during the fighting in Belgium created a political crisis and lasting personal animosity.

During the fighting in May 1940, the Pierlot government came into conflict with King Leopold III who had taken personal command of the Belgian Army. The first confrontation between the government and the King occurred on 10 May, when the King, against the wishes of the government, left for his military headquarters without addressing the Chamber of Representatives like his father, Albert I, had done in 1914. Contact between the King and the government became sporadic while the government feared that the King was acting beyond his constitutional powers. Like his father, Leopold was subject to Article 64 of the constitution which specified that no act of the King was valid unless counter-signed by a government minister, yet also given supreme power in military matters under Article 68. The two clauses appeared to contradict each other and gave all the king's acts in military-political matters an unclear constitutional footing.

As the Belgian forces, together with their French and British allies, were forced to retreat, Leopold decided that surrendering the army was the only viable course of action. On 24 May, as the government was leaving the country for exile in France, a group of ministers including Pierlot held a final meeting with Leopold at the Kasteel van Wijnendale. They called for him to follow the example of the Norwegian king, Haakon VII, and join them in exile as a symbol of continued resistance. Leopold refused, believing that as commander, he should surrender alongside his army, provoking real animosity. He also believed that, by leaving for France, the Belgian government would surrender its neutrality and become a puppet government. He also believed that, as a neutral power with no formal treaty of alliance with France or Britain, the Belgian army was not obliged to hold out as long as it possibly could if it incurred huge casualties and had no chance of defending its own territory. On 28 May, after a brief attempt to form a new government of sympathetic politicians under Henri de Man and after denouncing Pierlot and his government, Leopold surrendered to the Germans and was made a prisoner of war.

"Casting aside the unanimous and formal advice of the Government, the King has opened separate negotiations and is dealing with the enemy. Belgium will be stupefied that the King has broken the bond that united him with his people...the King, having put himself under the control of the enemy, is unfit to reign..."

— Pierlot's Radio Paris speech of 28 May 1940

Leopold's decision to surrender was seized on by the British and French press who blamed him for the military situation. The Belgian government met in Paris on 26 May and invoked Article 82 of the Constitution, declaring the monarch unable to reign (dans l'impossibilité de régner), and resolved to continue the fight against Germany. The following day, Pierlot held an important meeting with the French Prime Minister, Paul Reynaud, in which the French premier called for the Belgian government to publicly denounce the King and his surrender. Following the meeting, Pierlot gave a radio speech denouncing the King whom he accused of acting unconstitutionally and in sympathy with the Germans. Before being broadcast, Pierlot's speech was heavily edited by the French minister Georges Mandel to ensure a position favorable to the French. The denunciation of the King, who was popular across most strata of Belgian society and supported by the church, led to a big loss of public support and alienated Pierlot from his supporters and party.

=== Exile government in France ===
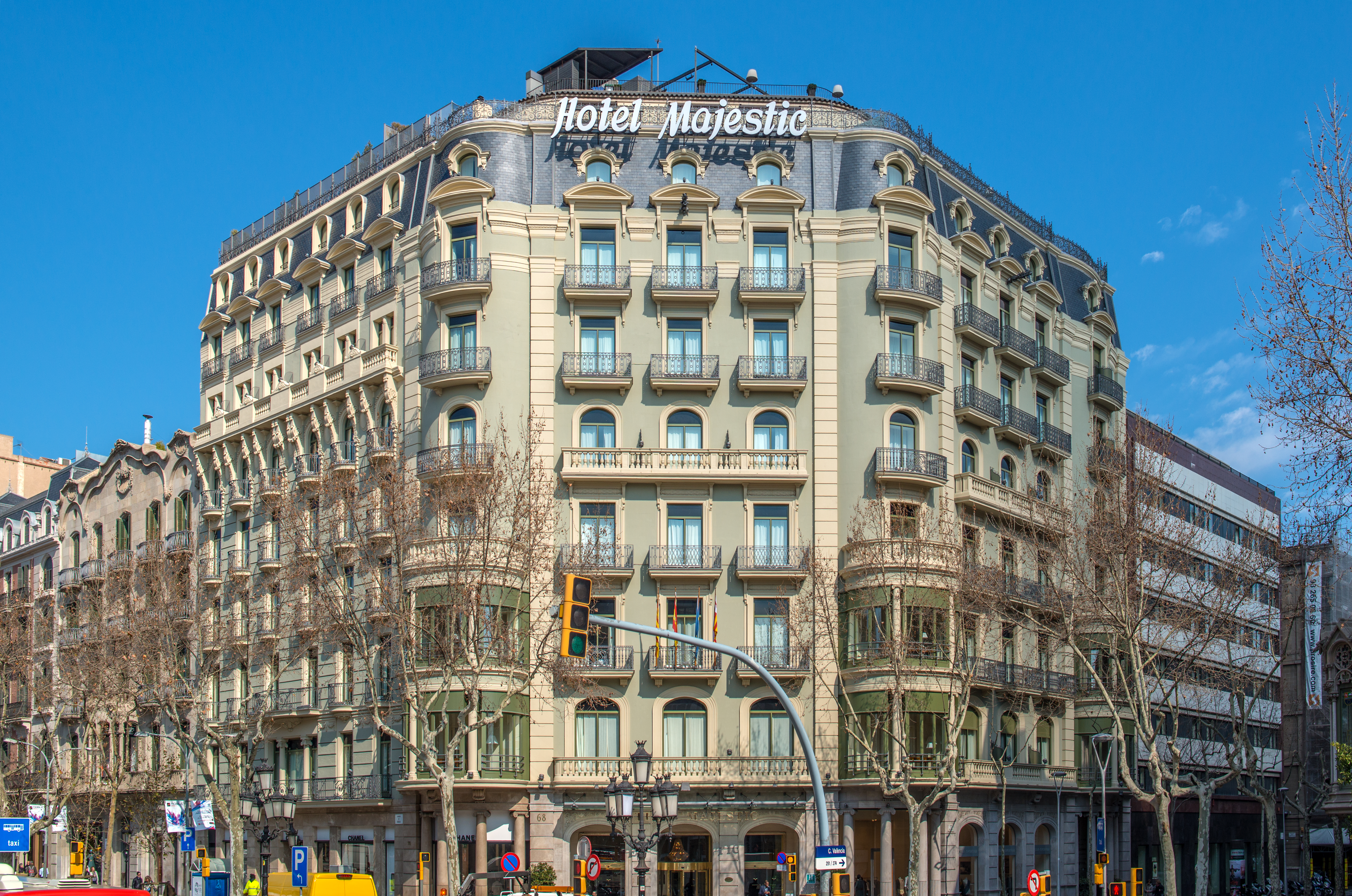
The Hotel Majestic in Barcelona. Pierlot and Spaak escaped from the Spanish police in the hotel to come to Britain in the autumn of 1940. This is commemorated by a plaque on the building.

The government met in Limoges and then withdrew to Poitiers and Bordeaux, but as the French military situation deteriorated, became split over what should happen. The government was split between those who supported staying in France or staying with the French government and those who supported withdrawing to the United Kingdom. Pierlot supported retreating to London, but was keen to preserve the unity of his government, most of which supported remaining in France. Hoping to keep the Belgian Congo under Belgian sovereignty, Pierlot allowed the Minister of the Colonies, Albert de Vleeschauwer, to leave France while the government met to consider whether it should resign to make way for a new constitutional authority in occupied Brussels.

Fearing a surrender to the Germans, Marcel-Henri Jaspar, a junior minister, left France for London where, together with Camille Huysmans, he appeared to form a rebel government or Belgian National Committee (Comité national belge) condemned by the official government. De Vleeschauwer arrived in London, where he was joined by Camille Gutt, the Minister of Finances, to deal with the threat. Pierlot remained in France. De Vleeschauwer travelled to neutral Spain where, at Le Perthus on the French-Spanish border, he met with Pierlot and Paul-Henri Spaak, the Minister of Foreign Affairs, to attempt to persuade them to join him in London. Pierlot refused. Continued negotiations with the new Vichy government of Philippe Pétain proved fruitless. In August 1940, under pressure from the Germans, the French broke off diplomatic relations with the Belgian government and ordered it to disband. On 22 August, Pierlot and Spaak received the permission of the government to leave for London while the rest of the government remained in France.

Pierlot and Spaak, together with Pierlot's family, crossed into Francoist Spain with an official visa, but were arrested in Barcelona and held under house arrest in a hotel. On 18 October, they escaped from confinement and headed for Portugal where the regime of António de Oliveira Salazar, although neutral, was more sympathetic to the Allied cause than Spain. They finally arrived in London on 22 October.

=== Exile government in London ===
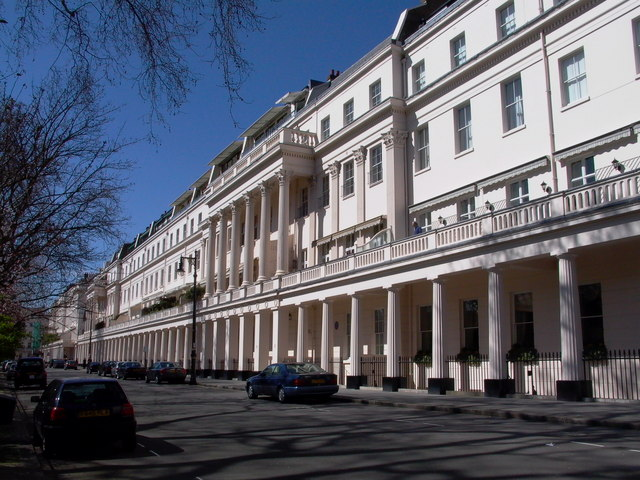
View of Eaton Square in London, where the government in exile was based through much of the war

Shortly after his arrived in London, during the middle of the Blitz, Pierlot narrowly avoided being killed when the Carlton Hotel, where he was staying, was destroyed in bombing in November 1940.

The arrival of Pierlot and Spaak officially began the period of the "Government of Four" (Pierlot, Spaak, Gutt and De Vleeschauwer) which formed the core of the Belgian government in exile. Nonetheless, the Foreign Office distrusted Pierlot for not leaving France sooner. The Foreign Minister, Anthony Eden, is said to have remarked that "Pierlot is not impressive, but he is legitimate". Pierlot's status as the last elected Prime Minister did however provide sufficient legitimacy for the official government to undermine the Jaspar-Huysmans government in the eyes of the British government and achieve officially-approved status.

The government in exile received full diplomatic recognition from the Allied countries. The bulk of the Belgian government was installed in Eaton Square in the Belgravia area of London, which before the war had been the location of the Belgian Embassy. Other government departments were installed in nearby Hobart Place, Belgrave Square and in Knightsbridge. By May 1941, there were nearly 750 people working in the government in London in all capacities. The government in exile directed the formation of the Free Belgian Forces and was negotiated with the Resistance and other Allied governments. The government in exile also controlled much of Belgium's gold reserves, which had been evacuated before the defeat, which it loaned to the British and American governments. It was also involved in coordinating the war effort of the Belgian Congo which was an important source of raw materials, like uranium, to the Allies. From early in the war, the government was able to make contact with Leopold, through various intermediaries, but was unable to create a full reconciliation between the royal and Pierlot factions.

On 28 April 1941, Pierlot's two eldest children were travelling to their boarding school when the train they were on caught fire near Westborough, Lincolnshire. Both were killed.

Pierlot was one of the chief supporters of the Benelux Customs Union negotiated with both the Dutch and Luxembourgish governments in exile and signed in September 1944. Unlike Spaak, who was a staunch supporter of greater cooperation between states in Western Europe, Pierlot supported a transatlantic alliance with the United States to guarantee Belgian independence after the end of the war.

==== Defence ministry crisis ====
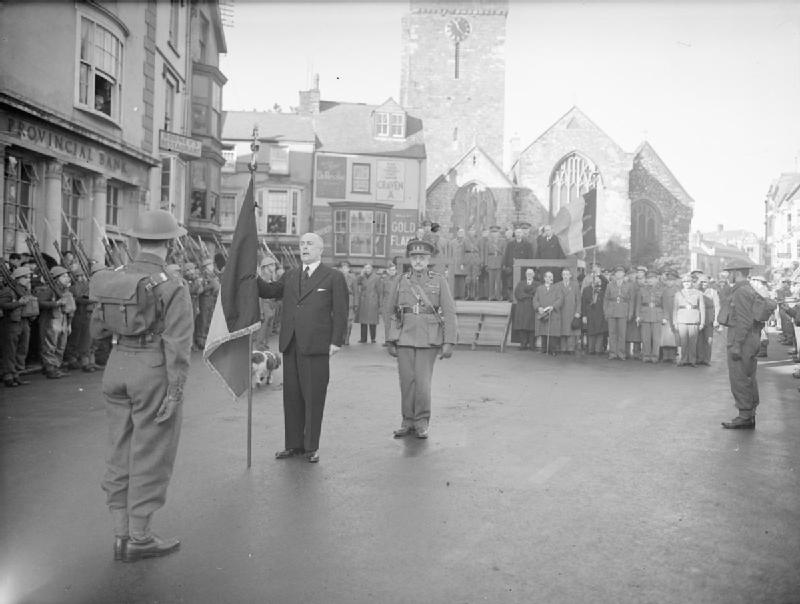
Pierlot addresses a parade of Belgian soldiers at Tenby, Wales in 1940

From its inception, the position of Minister of Defence in the government in exile was heavily contested. The appointment of Henri Rolin, an academic, to the position was particularly resented. In October 1942, Pierlot dismissed Rolin who he accused of involving himself in factional internal politics of the army, parts of which had begun to behave mutinously about their perceived inaction. To resolve the deadlock, Pierlot decided to take on the position personally. He began a major restructuring of the command structure of the infantry in an ultimately successful attempt to resolve the situation. A minor mutiny among soldiers from an artillery battery was quickly suppressed in November 1942, but Pierlot was widely criticised by the British press during the soldiers' court martial in January 1943.

In 1944, Pierlot began drawing up plans for the reorganization of the Belgian Army after the liberation, known as the Pierlot Plan (Plan Pierlot). The plan called for the formation of two brigades of infantry, six battalions of fusiliers, logistics and support units in Belgium immediately after liberation in order to fight alongside Allied troops during an invasion of Germany. In the longer term, these troops would form the core of a new division around which more troops could be raised.

=== Liberation governments ===
The liberation of Belgium begun in September 1944 as Allied forces moved eastwards. Brussels was liberated on 3 September. On 8 September, Pierlot and the government in exile arrived in the city by aeroplane. The return of the government was met with general indifference by the population, which felt the government had been indifferent to the plight of the population during the occupation.

"Nobody had been warned of our arrival. The cars, which took us into town, were preceded by a jeep. One of our colleagues stood in it, shouting to the few citizens we passed: 'Here is your Government'. I must confess that this produced no reaction at all, neither hostility nor enthusiasm, just total indifference"

— Paul-Henri Spaak, on the government's return to Brussels

Parliament met for the first time since 1940 on 19 September 1944 in which Pierlot presented a summary of the government's actions in Britain during the occupation. One of the first acts of the government was to make Prince Charles, Leopold's brother, the prince regent on 20 September. On 26 September, a new liberation government of national unity was created. Because of a shortage of candidates, Pierlot continued to head it. The new government included members of the Communist Party of Belgium (PCB-KPB) for the first time. It presided over the eventual liberation of all of Belgium, delayed by a German offensive in the Ardennes in the winter of 1944. The government was weakened by continued problems with the national food supply in the winter of 1944 which caused popular discontent.

During this period, the government was involved in launching Gutt's monetary reform plan as well as the disarming of the resistance as part of the transition to stability. A major crisis emerged within the government over the refusal of the Front de l'Indépendance (FI-OF) and the Partisans Armés (PA), two large left-wing resistance groups, to disband and disarm. Pierlot, suspicious of their motivations, came into confrontation with the Communists. The three Communist ministers resigned from the government, and the party began agitating against Pierlot. Amid fears of a Communist coup d'état, parliament voted through emergency powers allowing the Gendarmerie to forcibly disarm the resistance though sporadic strikes continued. The government also voted through important social security reforms.

Continued problems with the food supply, coupled the unpopularity of some of the government's measures, led to widespread press criticism of the Pierlot government. Strikes across the country in February 1945 further destabilised the government. On 7 February 1945, Pierlot publicly defended the actions of the government in parliament, but failed to make a significant impression. The government fell in February, and was replaced by a new, short-lived national union government under Achille Van Acker while the polemic surrounding the possible dismissal or restatement of Leopold III were considered.

== Later life and death ==
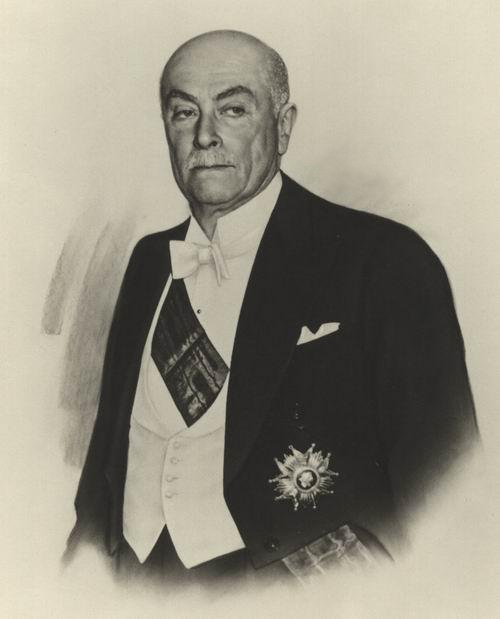
Portrait of Pierlot in old age

After the fall of his government, Pierlot returned to his position as senator of the arrondissements of Arlon, Marche-en-Famenne, Bastogne, Neufchâteau and Virton until the elections of February 1946. In September 1945, Pierlot was appointed to the honorary role of Minister of State by Charles and, shortly after the 1946 election, was awarded the title of Count. Because he was considered an anti-Leopoldist during the crisis surrounding the Royal Question, he was ostracised by the pro-Leopoldist successor to the Catholic Party, the Christian Social Party (Parti social-chrétien or PSC-CVP).

Retiring from politics, Pierlot returned to practicing law in Brussels. In 1946, a book entitled the Livre Blanc (White Book) was published at the request of Leopold, defending the King and attacking the exile government's record. Responding to the criticism, Pierlot published a widely distributed series of articles in the newspaper Le Soir. He remained a controversial figure. King Baudouin, replacing his father as King in 1950, also refused to receive Pierlot at the palace. After 1947, he refused to return to politics or to respond publicly to criticism from his political enemies.

Pierlot died in Uccle, a wealthy suburb of Brussels, on 13 December 1963, ten days before his 80th birthday. He is buried in Cugnon. A charitable organisation, the Fondation Hubert Pierlot (Hubert Pierlot Foundation), was established by friends of Pierlot in 1966. His wife Marie-Louise died in 1980 aged 85.

== Posthumous rehabilitation ==
After his death, Pierlot's political reputation was reappraised by historians who reconsidered the decisions he took during his wartime government. He was notably praised by his colleague, Paul-Henri Spaak who later became first President of the United Nations General Assembly, Secretary General of NATO, and one of the founding fathers of the European Union. In his 1969 memoires, Spaak praised Pierlot as "serious to the point of severity, honest to the point of scrupulosity, a tireless worker, a devout Christian, a patriot, a model of civic, professional, and family virtues, he was an exceptional man."

== Bibliography ==
- Conway, Martin; Gotovitch, José, eds. (2001). Europe in Exile: European Exile Communities in Britain, 1940–45 (1st ed.). New York: Berghahn. ISBN 1-57181-503-1.
- Conway, Martin (2012). The Sorrows of Belgium: Liberation and Political Reconstruction, 1944-1947. Oxford: Oxford University Press. ISBN 978-0-19-969434-1.
- Van den Dungen, Pierre (2011). Hubert Pierlot (1883–1963). Brussels: Le Cri. ISBN 978-2-8710-6542-5.
- Grosbois, Thierry (2007). Pierlot, 1930–1950. Brussels: Racine. ISBN 978-2873864859.
- Laporte, Christian (1 September 1994). "Quatre ans à Londres: Eaton Square, Petite Belgique". Le Soir.
- Spaak, Paul-Henri (1969). Combats inachevés. Vol. I: De l'indépendance à l'alliance. Paris: Fayard. OCLC 435827449.
- Veranneman, Jean-Michel (2014). Belgium in the Second World War. Barnsley: Pen and Sword. ISBN 978-1-78337-607-0.
- Yapou, Eliezer (2006). "Belgium: Disintegration and Resurrection". Governments in Exile, 1939–1945. Jerusalem.

Political offices
Preceded by Paul-Henri Spaak	Prime Minister of Belgium; 1939–1945	Succeeded by Achille Van Acker
