= Mersey-class trawler =

1918 class of minesweeper trawler of the Royal Navy

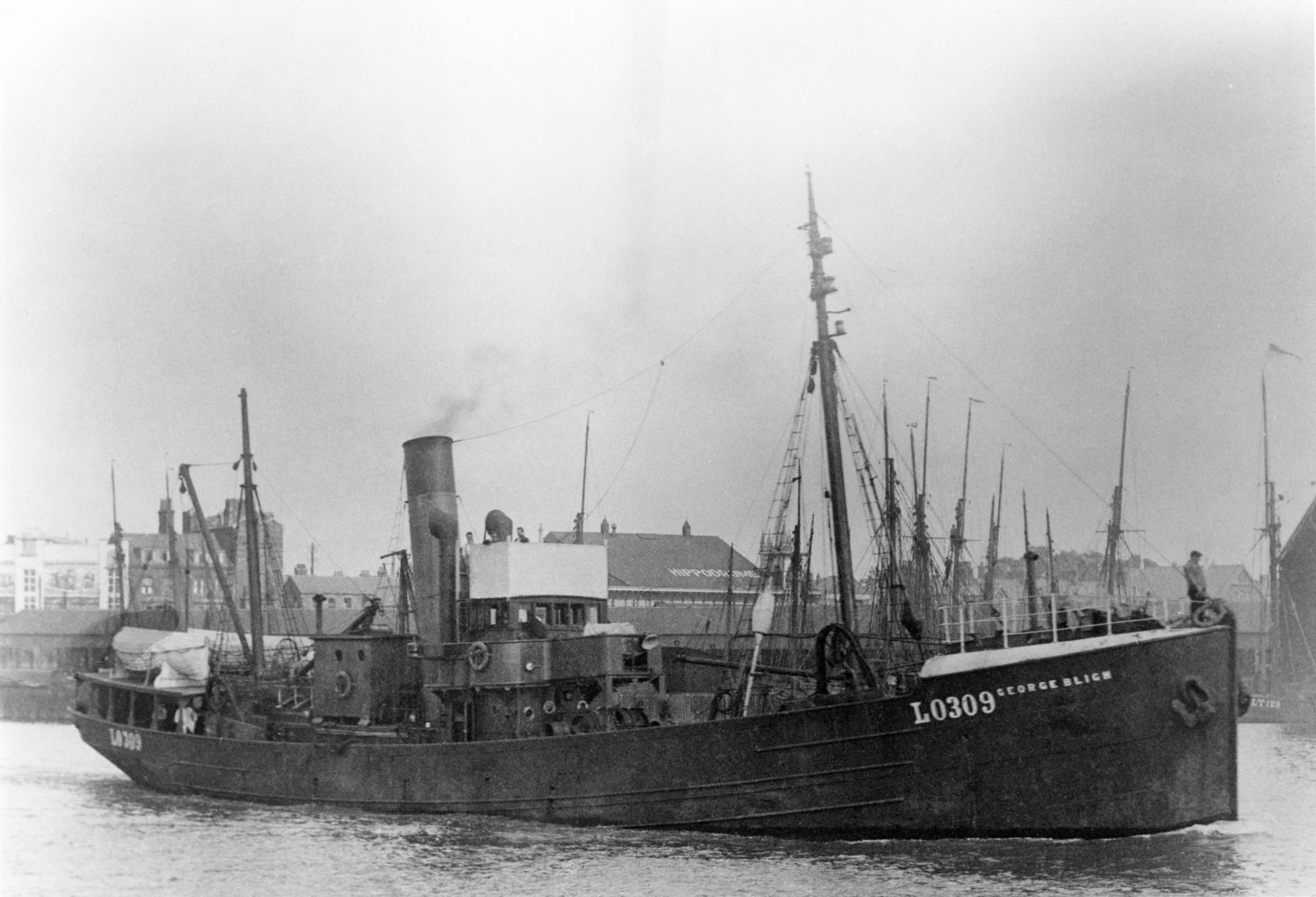
- HMT George Bligh in later use as fisheries research vessel

Class overview
- Name: Mersey class
- Builders: Goole Shipbuilding & Repairing Company; Cochrane & Sons; Cook, Welton & Gemmell; Ferguson Brothers; Lobnitz & Company
- Operators: Royal Navy; subsequently, many other Allied navies
- In service: 1916–1946 (Royal Navy)
- Planned: 156
- Completed: 105 standard and 7 non-standard
- Canceled: 44

General characteristics (standard build)
- Type: Admiralty trawler
- Tonnage: 330 GRT
- Displacement: 438 tons standard
- Length: 148 ft (45 m)
- Beam: 23 ft 9 in (7.24 m)
- Draught: 13 ft (4.0 m)
- Installed power: 87 nhp 600 ihp (450 kW)
- Propulsion: 1 × 3 cyl. triple-expansion engine, single shaft, 1 screw, 1 boiler
- Speed: 11 knots (20 km/h; 13 mph) maximum
- Complement: 15–20 men
- Armament: Varied depending on vessel.
- Notes: Fuel: Coal 184 t:

The Mersey class was a class of Admiralty naval trawlers built for the Royal Navy (or other government institutions) prior to the First World War. Admiralty meant they were built for military service as opposed to conversions of existing boats. The majority of the vessels were built to a standard design but a few included in the class were built differently.

Some were completed as fishing vessels rather than for military service. Many went on to be used in various roles during World War II.

== Design ==
The Mersey-class trawlers were purpose-built to a standard Admiralty design intended for patrol, anti-submarine and minesweeping roles. HMT John Quilliam, delivered in June 1917, was the first of the standard completions.

Propulsion was a three-cylinder triple expansion steam engine, powered from a single boiler, and delivering nominal 87 horsepower (600 indicated horsepower)

The smallest of the non-standard ships measured 36.8 metres (120 ft 9 in) in length with a 6.71 m (22 ft 0 in) beam.

=== Armament ===
- 1x QF 12-pounder 12 cwt naval gun: John Edmund, John Highland, John Jacobs, John Johnson, John Pasco, John Quilliam, John Welstead, John Yule, Richard Bulkeley, Richard Colliver, Robert Double, Robert Drummond, Samuel Jameson, Thomas Jarvis, Thomas Johns, Thomas Whipple, William Doak, William Honnor, William Inwood, William Jackson, William Johnson, William Ram
- 1 × QF 12-pdr 12 cwt gun and mechanical minesweeping gear: Cornelius Buckley, William Abrahams, Andrew King, George Andrew, Henry Cramwell, Henry Ford, Isaac Chant, James Buchanan, Lewis Roatley, Michael Clements, Robert Barton, Robert Bookless, Thomas Atkinson, Thomas Bailey, Thomas Thresher, William Jones, William Rivers
- 2 × QF 12-pdr 12 cwt gun and mechanical minesweeping gear: William Westenburgh
- 1x QF 4-inch gun, 1 × QF 12-pounder 12 cwt, 1x depth-charge thrower (also known as "bomb thrower"): Fraser Eaves
- 1 × QF 12-pdr 12 cwt gun, 1x depth-charge thrower: George Bligh, James Adams, John Ebbs, John Felton, John Jefferson, Lewes Reeves, Nicholas Dean, Samuel Dowden, Thomas Cornwall
- 1x QF 6-pounder Hotchkiss: Richard Jewell
- 1 × QF 4-inch gun: Thomas Jago

== Ships of class ==
Records for steam trawler "Lord Mersey" says she was built by Cochrane as a prototype for the Mersey class naval trawlers. She was launched 11 October 1916 (probably 1915), 137.8 foot long and 326 tons. She was completed in February, 1916 and requisitioned for minesweeping in April, 1916.

For the Mersey-class the HMT prefix meant "His Majesty’s Trawler" but HMT was also used for vessels taken into Sea Transport Service as transports ("Hired Military Transport", though often referred to as “His Majesty’s Troopship”) and His Majesty's Tug.

Standard Mersey
Name	Admiralty number	Launch date	Shipbuilder	Notes	Fate
HMT Alexander Hills	3549	22 May 1917	Cochrane	138 × 23 × 13 ft. Armament: 1x QF 12-pounder 12 cwt naval gun Crew: 15, up to 18 with wireless. Renamed Moy September 1920.	Sold January 1946, renamed Coral Island 1947.
HMT Alexander Macbeth	4241	14 July 1919	Cochrane	Completed as fishing vessel.	Sold 1919, renamed John W. Johnson.
HMT Andrew Jewer	3844	4 December 1918	Cochrane	138 × 23 × 13 ft. Armament: 1 × QF 12-per 12 cwt gun Crew: 15, up to 18 with wireless. Gunnery tender. Renamed Nith September 1920, Excellent June 1922.	Sold 1946, renamed Malvern.
HMT Andrew King	3545	19 April 1917	Cochrane	138 × 23 × 13 ft. Armament: 1 × 12-pdr. Crew: 15, up to 18 with wireless. Hydrophone vessel, then minesweeper. Renamed Ouse September 1920.	Mined 20 February 1941 off Tobruk.
HMT Benjamin Hawkins	3858	7 February 1920	Goole SB	Completed as fishing vessel.	Sold 17 October 1919. Delivered February 1920, named Frobisher. Purchased June 1933 as boom defence vessel, renamed Fastnet.
HMT Charles Adair	3551	7 June 1917	Cochrane	Armament: 1 × QF 12-per 12 cwt gun. Crew: 15, up to 18 with wireless. Hydrophone vessel.	Sold 1923, renamed Sleaford 1924. Served as French Saint Benoit in WWII
HMT Charles Hammond	3830	26 February 1918	Cochrane	138 × 23 × 13 ft. Armament: 1 × QF 12-per 12 cwt gun. Crew: 15, up to 18 with wireless.	Sunk 2 November 1918 in collision with destroyer HMS Marksman off Kirkcaldy.
HMT Christopher Dixon	3563	4 September 1917	Cochrane	138 × 23 × 13 ft. Armament: 1 × QF 12-per 12 cwt gun. Crew: 15, up to 18 with wireless.	To Irish Government 1922, same name. Served as Lord Gainford in WWII.
HMT Daniel Fearall	3571	2 November 1917	Cochrane	138 × 23 × 13 ft. Armament: 1 × QF 12-per 12 cwt gun, 1x Depth-charge thrower and mechanical minesweeping gear: Crew: 15, up to 18 with wireless. Training ship. Renamed Stour September 1920, Pembroke September 1922, Stour 1939.	Sold July 1946, renamed Storesse 1947.
HMT Daniel Mcpherson	4242	16 August 1919	Cochrane	Completed as fishing vessel	Sold 1919, renamed Lord Halifax.
HMT Daniel Munro	4239	20 June 1919	Cochrane	Completed as fishing vessel	Sold 1919, renamed Estrella do Norte and served as such in WWII.
HMT Degara Lerosa	4237	6 June 1919	Cochrane	Completed as fishing vessel	Sold 1919, renamed James Johnson. Served as Greek Axios in WWII.
HMT Edward Druce	3736	30 July 1918	Goole SB	138 × 23 × 13 ft. Armament: 1 × QF 12-per 12 cwt gun Crew: 15, up to 18 with wireless. Hydrophone vessel.	Sold 1920, renamed Girard and served as such in WWII.
HMT Edward Mcguire	4251	17 May 1919	Cochrane	Completed as fishing vessel.	Sold 1920, renamed Cape St. Vincent. Served as Korowa (RAN) in WWII.
HMT Edward Williams	3547	8 May 1917	Cochrane	138 × 23 × 13 ft. Armament: 1 × QF 12-pdr 12 cwt gun, 1x Depth-charge thrower and mechanical minesweeping gear: Crew: 15, up to 18 with wireless. Minesweeper.	Sold 1922, renamed Cape Trafalgar 1923 and served as such in WWII.
HMT Fraser Eaves	3567	2 October 1917	Cochrane	138 × 23 × 13 ft. Armament: × 4 in, 1 × 12-pdr AA, 1 × 7.5 in BT. Crew: 15, up to 18 with wireless. Renamed Doon September 1920.	Sold 1946, renamed Donesse.
HMT George Andrew	3556	23 Jul 1917	Cochrane	138 × 23 × 13 ft. Armament: 1 × 12-pdr AA. Crew: 15, up to 18 with wireless. Minesweeper.	Sold 1921, renamed Lord Astor. Served as Cranefly in WWII.
HMT George Bligh	3542	24 February 1917	Cochrane	138 × 23 × 13 ft. Armament: 1 × 12-pdr, 1 × 7.5 in BT. Crew: 15, up to 18 with wireless.	Sold 1921, same name. Became fisheries research vessel. Served in WWII.
HMT George Brown	3548	10 May 1917	Cochrane	138 × 23 × 13 ft. Armament: 1 × QF 12-per 12 cwt gun. Crew: 15, up to 18 with wireless. Renamed William Dogherty December 1919.	Sold 1922, renamed Rosedale Wyke.
HMT George Fenwick	3568	10 January 1918	Cochrane	138 × 23 × 13 ft. Armament: 1 × QF 12-per 12 cwt gun. Crew: 15, up to 18 with wireless. Renamed William Dogherty December 1919.	Sold 1923, renamed Cape Otway. Served as Greek Strymon in WWII
HMT George Westphall	3575	7 February 1918	Cochrane	138 × 23 × 13 ft. Armament: 1 × QF 12-per 12 cwt gun. Crew: 15, up to 18 with wireless.	Sold 1921, renamed Estelle Yvonne. Lost 1923.
HMT Henry Cramwell	3705	24 December 1918	Lobnitz	138 × 23 × 13 ft. Armament: 1 × 12-pdr. Crew: 15, up to 18 with wireless. Minesweeper	Sold 1922 to Spain, renamed Xauen.
HMT Henry Ford	3569	18 October 1917	Cochrane	138 × 23 × 13 ft. Armament: 1 × 12-pdr. Crew: 15, up to 18 with wireless. Minesweeper. Renamed Boadicea II February 1919, Henry Ford February 1920.	Sold 1921, renamed Duperre and served as such for France in WWII.
HMT Henry Lancaster	4231	8 Apr 1919	Cochrane	138 × 23 × 13 ft. Armament: usually 1 × 12-pdr & BT. Crew: 15, up to 18 with wireless. Marker buoy vessel	Sold August 1921, same name. Served as Longtow in WWII.
HMT Henry Marsh	4253	31 May 1919	Cochrane	Completed as fishing vessel.	Sold 1920, renamed Springbok.
HMT Isaac Chant	3704	1 October 1918	Lobnitz	138 × 23 × 13 ft. Armament: 1 × 12-pdr. Crew: 15, up to 18 with wireless. Minesweeper. Renamed Colne September 1920.	Sold 1949.
HMT James Adams	3555	7 July 1917	Cochrane	138 × 23 × 13 ft. Armament: 1 × 12-pdr AA, 1 × 7.5 in BT. Crew: 15, up to 18 with wireless.	Sold 1920 renamed Pilote 5 and served as such for Belgium in WWII.
HMT James Buchanan	3565	18 September 1917	Cochrane	Armament: 1 × 12-pdr AA. Crew: 15, up to 18 with wireless. Hydrophone vessel, then minesweeper.	Sold 1922, renamed Stoneferry. Served as Force in WWII.
HMT James Caton	3703	26 August 1918	Lobnitz	Armament: 1 × 12-pdr AA. Crew: 15, up to 18 with wireless. Minesweeper.	Sold 1921, renamed Emilie Pierre. Served as French St. Pierre d'Alcantara in WWII
HMT James Hayes	3859	27 June 1919	Goole SB	138 × 23 × 13 ft. Completed as fishing vessel.	Sold 1919, renamed Viscount Grey. Stranded 11 February 1920, total loss.
HMT James Hulbert	3799	9 Sep 1919	Lobnitz	138 × 23 × 13 ft. Completed as fishing vessel.	Sold 1919, renamed M. J. Reid. Served as Jean Frederic in WWII.
HMT James Jones	3842	9 Nov 1918	Cochrane	138 × 23 × 13 ft. Armament: 1 × QF 12-per 12 cwt gun:. Crew: 15, up to 18 with wireless. Renamed Cherwell September 1920.	Sold 1948 with same name.
HMT James Ludford	4232	1 May 1919	Cochrane	138 × 23 × 13 ft. Armament: usually 1 × 12-pdr & BT. Crew: 15, up to 18 with wireless. Served as marker buoy vessel	Mined 14 December 1939 off the Tyne.
HMT James Mansell	4238	26 June 1919	Cochrane	Completed as fishing vessel.	Sold 1919, renamed Snorri Sturluson, James Mansell 1922.
HMT James Mcdonald	4244	9 September 1919	Cochrane	Completed as fishing vessel.	Sold 1919, renamed Grand Fleet. Served as Barbara Robertson in WWII.
HMT James Mclaughlin	4250	1 May 1919	Cochrane	Completed as fishing vessel.	Sold 1919, renamed General Birdwood and served as such in WWII.
HMT James Wright	3576	15 February 1918	Cochrane	138 × 23 × 13 ft. Armament: 1 × QF 12-per 12 cwt gun:. Crew: 15, up to 18 with wireless.	Sold 1921, renamed Lord Ancaster. Served as Loch Moidart in WWII.
HMT James Young	4235	8 May 1919	Cochrane	Completed as fishing vessel.	Sold 1919, same name.
HMT Jeremiah Lewis	4234	25 February 1918	Cochrane	138 × 23 × 13 ft. Armament: usually 1 × 12-pdr & BT. Crew: 15, up to 18 with wireless.	Sold 1920, renamed Field Marshal Robertson.
HMT John Cormack	3562	4 September 1917	Cochrane	138 × 23 × 13 ft. Armament: 1 × QF 12-per 12 cwt gun:. Crew: 15, up to 18 with wireless.	Sold 1922, renamed Lord Pirrie. Served as Chiltern in WWII.
HMT John Cottrell	4463	1 November 1919	Goole SB	Completed as fishing vessel.	Sold 1919, renamed St. Endellion. Served as Blighty in WWII.
HMT John Dunn	3741	27 February 1918	Ferguson	138 × 23 × 13 ft. Armament: 1 × QF 12-per 12 cwt gun:. Crew: 15, up to 18 with wireless. Hydrophone vessel.	Sold 1923, same name. Served as Florence Brierley in WWII.
HMT John Dutton	3739	17 January 1918	Ferguson	138 × 23 × 13 ft. Armament: 1 × QF 12-per 12 cwt gun:. Crew: 15, up to 18 with wireless.	Sold 1921, later renamed Karlsefni.
HMT John Ebbs	3566	2 October 1917	Cochrane	138 × 23 × 13 ft. Armament: 1 × 12-pdr, 1 × 3.5 in BT. Crew: 15, up to 18 with wireless. Hydrophone vessel.	Sold 1920, renamed Pilote 4. Served as Belgian ship A4 in WWII.
HMT John Edmund	3738	22 October 1918	Goole SB	138 × 23 × 13 ft. Armament: 1 × 12-pdr. Crew: 15, up to 18 with wireless. Renamed Foyle 9.1920. Loaned September 1921 to June 1934 to South African Navy as Sonneblom.	Sold 1946, renamed Cramond Island.
HMT John Felton	3570	1 Nov 1917	Cochrane	138 × 23 × 13 ft. Armament: 1 × 12-pdr AA, 1-6in BT. Crew: 15, up to 18 with wireless.	Sold 1920, same name.
HMT John Highland	3797	23 September 1918	Ferguson	138 × x 23 × 13 ft. Armament: 1 × 12-pdr. Crew: 15, up to 18 with wireless.	Sold 1920, renamed Ocean Ensign.
HMT John Jacobs	3833	15 April 1918	Cochrane	138 × x 23 × 13 ft. Armament: 1 × 12-pdr. Crew: 15, up to 18 with wireless.	Sold 1922, renamed Castlenau and served as such in WWII.
HMT John Jefferson	3834	23 April 1918	Cochrane	Hydrophone vessel.	Sold 1920, renamed St. Amant. Served as Lady Enid in WWII.
HMT John Johnson	3832	19 April 1918	Cochrane	138 × 23 × 13 ft. Armament: 1 × 12-pdr. Crew: 15, up to 18 with wireless.	Sold 1922, renamed Cloughton Wyke and served as such in WWII.
HMT John Mann	4245	6 September 1919	Cochrane	Completed as fishing vessel.	Sold 1920, renamed Earl Haig. Purchased 1933, renamed Barnet. Sold 1947. In 1950 employed by salvors of HMS Warspite off Penzance.
HMT John Pasco	3544	19 April 1917	Cochrane	138 × 23 × 13 ft. Armament: 1 × 12-pdr. Crew: 15, up to 18 with wireless. Escort.	Sold 1922, renamed Arin Bjorn Hersir.
HMT John Quilliam	3541	12 February 1917	Cochrane	138 × 23 × 13 ft. Armament: 1 × 12-pdr. Crew: 15, up to 18 with wireless. Hydrophone vessel.	Sold 1921. Converted to Danish research vessel Dana II
HMT John Welstead	3573	15 February 1918	Cochrane	138 × 23 × 13 ft. Armament: 1 × 12-pdr. Crew: 15, up to 18 with wireless.	Sold 1922, renamed Lord Harewood. Served as Myrland in WWII.
HMT John Yule	3543	24 March 1917	Cochrane	138 × 23 × 13 ft. Armament: 1 × 12-pdr. Crew: 15, up to 18 with wireless. Hydrophone vessel.	Sold 1921 renamed Notre Dame de Lorette.
HMT Jonathan Clarke	4465	24 March 1920	Goole SB	Completed as fishing vessel.	Sold 1920, renamed St. Keverne.
HMT Jonathan Collins	4464	26 November 1919	Goole SB	Completed as fishing vessel.	Sold 1919, renamed St. Minver and served as such in WWII.
HMT Langdon Mackennon	4243	21 October 1919	Cochrane	Completed as fishing vessel.	Sold 1919, renamed Douglas H. Smith. Lost 1921.
HMT Lewis Mackenzie	4240	26 June 1919	Cochrane	Completed as fishing vessel.	Sold 1919, renamed Florence Johnson.
HMT Lewis Reeves	3553	23 June 1917	Cochrane	138 × 23 × 13 ft. Armament: 1 × 12-pdr AA, 1 × 7.5 in BT. Crew: 15, up to 18 with wireless.	Sold 1922, renamed Lord Hawke. Lost 1922.
HMT Lewis Roatley	3554	7 Jul 1917	Cochrane	138 × 23 × 13 ft. Armament: 1 × 12-pdr AA, 1 × 7.5 in BT. Crew: 15, up to 18 with wireless. Minesweeper	Sold 1922 renamed STALWART.
HMT Michael Clements	3561	21 Aug 1917	Cochrane	138 × 23 × 13 ft. Armament: 1 × 12-pdr AA, 1 × 7.5 in BT. Crew: 15, up to 18 with wireless. Minesweeper	Sunk 8.8-18 in collision off St. Catherines Point.
HMT Michael Mcdonald	4252	17 May 1919	Cochrane	Completed as fishing vessel.	Sold 1919, renamed Kanuck.
HMT Nicholas Couteur	4236	20 May 1919	Cochrane	Completed as fishing vessel.	Sold 1919, renamed Mary A. Johnson. Lost November 1920.
HMT Nicholas Dean	3740	11 March 1918	Ferguson	Hydrophone vessel.	Sold 1921, renamed Notre Dame de France.
HMT Patrick Mitchell	4248	16 April 1919	Cochrane	138 × 23 × 13 ft. Completed as fishing vessel.	Sold 1919, renamed Kelvin.
HMT Peter Hoffman	3798	8 July 1919	Lobnitz	138 × 23 × 13 ft. Completed as fishing vessel.	Sold 1919, renamed K. M. Hardy. Served as French Imbrin in WWII.
HMT Peter Magee	4249	1 May 1919	Cochrane	138 × 23 × 13 ft. Completed as fishing vessel.	Sold 1919, renamed Lord Ernle.
HMT Richard Bulkeley	3560	21 August 1917	Cochrane	138 × 23 × 13 ft. Armament: 1 × 12-pdr. Crew: 15, up to 18 with wireless.	Mined 12 July 1919 in the North Sea while on loan to US Navy.
HMT Richard Colliver	3701	26 February 1918	Lobnitz	138 × 23 × 13 ft. Armament: 1 × 12-pdr. Crew: 15, up to 18 with wireless.	Sold 1922, renamed Laurette.
HMT Richard Jewell	3836	6 August 1918	Cochrane	138 × 23 × 13 ft. Armament: 1 × 12-pdr. Crew: 15, up to 18 with wireless.	Sold 1922 renamed, Lord Knaresborough. Served as Fairway in WWII.
HMT Robert Barton	3559	28 August 1917	Cochrane	Minesweeper.	Sold 1922 renamed HAY BURNWYKE. Served as HAYBURN WYKE in WWII.
HMT Robert Bookless	3557	23 July 1917	Cochrane	138 × x 23 × 13 ft. Armament: 1 × 12-pdr. Crew: 15, up to 18 with wireless. Minesweeper.	Sold 1921 renamed GRIZ NEZ. Served as German M.4005 in WWII.
HMT Robert Cahill	4468	13 April 1921	Goole SB	Completed as fishing vessel.	Sold 1921, renamed Pierre Andre and served as such in WWII.
HMT Robert Double	3735	5 June 1918	Goole SB	Hydrophone vessel.	Sold 1922, same name, renamed Wolborough 1925.
HMT Robert Drummond	3742	4 May 1918	Ferguson	138 × 23 × 13 ft. Armament: 1 × 12-pdr. Crew: 15, up to 18 with wireless.	Sold 1922, same name, renamed Salmonby 1924. Lost 23 March 1926.
HMT Robert Finlay	3857	23 May 1919	Goole SB	Completed as fishing vessel.	Sold 1919, renamed Viscount Allenby.
HMT Robert Murray	4256	30 June 1919	Cochrane	Completed as fishing vessel.	Sold 1923, same name. Served as Northlyn in WWII.
HMT Samuel Dowden	3564	18 September 1917	Cochrane	138 × 23 × 13 ft. Armament: 1 × 12-pdr. 1 × 3.5 in BT. Crew: 15, up to 18 with wireless. Hydrophone vessel.	Sold 1922, renamed Royal Regiment. Served as Sea Mist in WWII.
HMT Samuel Jameson	3839	10 October 1918	Cochrane	138 × 23 × 13 ft. Armament: 1 × 12-pdr. Crew: 15, up to 18 with wireless. Renamed Ettrick September 1920.	Sold 1926, renamed Loughrigg. Served as Phyllisia in WWII.
HMT Samuel Martin	4255	28 June 1919	Cochrane	Completed as fishing vessel.	Sold 1920, renamed Field Marshal Plumer.
HMT Simeon Moon	4254	31 May 1919	Cochrane	Completed as fishing vessel.	Sold 1920, renamed General Rawlinson.
HMT Thomas Atkinson	3546	8 May 1917	Cochrane	138 × 23 × 13 ft. Armament: 1 × 12-pdr. Crew: 15, up to 18 with wireless. Minesweeper.	Sold 1923, renamed Cavendish. Served as Erith in WWII.
HMT Thomas Bailey	3558	4 August 1917	Cochrane	Minesweeper.	Sold 1922, renamed Pamxon.
HMT Thomas Cornwall	3702	10 June 1918	Lobnitz	138 × 23 × 13 ft. Armament: 1 × 12-pdr, 1 × 3.5 in BT. Crew: 15, up to 18 with wireless.	Sunk 29 October 1918 in collision off Flamborough Head.
HMT Thomas Cruize	3706	30 January 1919	Lobnitz	Completed as fishing vessel.	Sold 1919, renamed Celerina. Lost 11 December 1922.
HMT Thomas Jago	3835	31 July 1918	Cochrane	138 × 23 × 13 ft. Armament: × 4 in. Crew: 15, up to 18 with wireless. Escort.	Sold 1922, renamed St. Valery. Served as Lady Eleanor in WWII.
HMT Thomas Jarvis	3840	24 October 1918	Cochrane	138 × 23 × 13 ft. Armament: × 4 in. Crew: 15, up to 18 with wireless. Special Service Vessel. Renamed Exe September 1920.	Sold 1928, renamed Jan Volders.
HMT Thomas Johns	3837	3 September 1918	Cochrane	138 × 23 × 13 ft. Armament: × 4 in. Crew: 15, up to 18 with wireless. Renamed Eden September 1920, to South African Navy 1921–1934, renamed Immortelle.	Sold 1945.
HMT Thomas Maloney	4247	14 June 1919	Cochrane	Completed as fishing vessel.	Sold 1919, renamed St. Neots. Served as Adam in WWII.
HMT Thomas Matthews	4246	6 October 1919	Cochrane	Completed as fishing vessel.	Sold 1919, renamed Earl Beatty.
HMT Thomas Thresher	3572	9 February 1918	Cochrane	138 × 23 × 13 ft. Armament: 1 × 12-pdr. Crew: 15, up to 18 with wireless. Minesweeper.	Sold 1922, same name. Served as Syrian in WWII.
HMT Thomas Whipple	3574	4 February 1918	Cochrane	138 × 23 × 13 ft. Armament: 1 × 12-pdr. Crew: 15, up to 18 with wireless.	Sold 1922, renamed Lord Lascelles.
HMT William Chatwood	4467	24 February 1921	Goole SB	138 × 23 × 13 ft. Completed as fishing vessel.	Sold 1921, renamed Blanc Nez.
HMT William Courtney	4466	2 February 1921	Goole SB	Completed as fishing vessel.	Sold 1921, renamed Ternoise.
HMT William Doak	3737	23 September 1918	Goole SB	138 × 23 × 13 ft. Armament: 1 × 12-pdr. Crew: 15, up to 18 with wireless. Hydrophone vessel.	Sold 1922 to Spain, renamed Arcila.
HMT William Forbes	3856	25 May 1919	Goole SB	138 × 23 × 13 ft. Completed as fishing vessel.	Sold 1919, renamed Syrian.
HMT William Honnor	3796	26 August 1918	Ferguson	138 × 23 × 13 ft. Armament: 1 × 12-pdr. Crew: 15, up to 18 with wireless. Escort.	Sold 1922, renamed Grimurkamban.
HMT William Inwood	3841	30 October 1918	Cochrane	138 × 23 × 13 ft. Armament: 1 × 12-pdr. Crew: 15, up to 18 with wireless. Escort. Renamed Blackwater September 1920.	Sold 1946, renamed Spleis.
HMT William Jackson	3831	29 February 1918	Cochrane	138 × 23 × 13 ft. Armament: 1 × 12-pdr. Crew: 15, up to 18 with wireless.	Sold 1921, renamed Lord Byng. Served as Evelyn Rose in WWII.
HMT William Johnson	3843	22 November 1918	Cochrane	138 × 23 × 13 ft. Armament: 1 × 12-pdr. Crew: 15, up to 18 with wireless. Loaned to US Navy 1919.	Sold 1921, renamed Lord Birkenhead.
HMT William Jones	3838	8 September 1918	Cochrane	Minesweeper. Renamed Boyne September 1920.	Sold 1946, renamed Nypuberg.
HMT William Leech	4233	12 February 1919	Cochrane	138 × 23 × 13 ft. Armament: usually 1 × 12-pdr & BT. Crew: 15, up to 18 with wireless. Renamed Excellent February 1919.	Sold 1922, renamed William Leech. Served as French Excellent in WWII.
HMT William Ram	3550	7 June 1917	Cochrane	138 × 23 × 13 ft. Armament: 1 × 12-pdr. Crew: 15, up to 18 with wireless. Escort.	Sold 1921, renamed Lord Carson. Served as Welbeck in WWII.
HMT William Rivers	3552	9 June 1917	Cochrane	138 × 23 × 13 ft. Armament: 1 × 12-pdr. Crew: 15, up to 18 with wireless. Minesweeper.	Sold 1921, renamed Mont Cassel and served as such for France in WWII

Non-standard vessels
Name	Admiralty number	Launch date	Shipbuilder	Notes	Fate
				All: From 248 to 324 grt, Length from 117 to 125 ft Beam and draught 22 ft x 23 ft. Approx. TE 480ihp, 10.5 kts. Armament: 1x QF 12-pounder 12 cwt naval gun, 1x Depth-charge thrower and mechanical minesweeping gear: Crew: 15, up to 18 with wireless.	
HMT Anthony Aslett	3579	22 February 1917	Cochrane	Minesweeper. Renamed Rother September 1920.	Sold 1922 to Spain, renamed Uad Quert.
HMT Charles Astie	3578	25 January 1917	Cochrane		Mined 26 June 1917 off Lough Swilly.
HMT Cornelius Buckley	3581	24 February 1917	Cochrane	Minesweeper.	Sold 1922, renamed Aria.
HMT John Appleby (ex-Corinthia)	3612	30 January 1917	Cook, Welton & Gemmell	Hydrophone vessel.	Sold 1923, renamed Lois and served as such in WWII.
HMT John Arthur (ex-Sannyrion)	3613	10 February 1917	Cook, Welton & Gemmell	Hydrophone vessel.	Sold 1922, renamed Gladys and served as such in WWII.
HMT William Abrahams	3580	24 February 1917	Cochrane	Minesweeper.	Sold 1922, renamed Santini.
HMT William Westenburgh	3577	25 January 1917	Cochrane	Minesweeper.	Sold 1921, renamed Lord Talbot. Served as Star of the Realm in WWII.

A further 44 vessels were ordered, but were cancelled before delivery.
