= HNLMS Notre Dame de France =

World War II Dutch patrol ship

History

Netherlands
- Name: Notre Dame de France
- Namesake: Notre Dame
- Builder: Smith's Dock Company Limited, Stockton-on-Tees
- Laid down: 1930
- Launched: 3 February 1931
- Commissioned: 25 November 1940
- Fate: Decommissioned and returned to Royal Navy service 15 January 1942.

General characteristics
- Type: Anti-submarine naval trawler
- Displacement: 458.3 t (451.1 long tons) standard
- Length: 45.96 m (150 ft 9 in)
- Beam: 8 m (26 ft 3 in)
- Draught: 4.8 m (15 ft 9 in)
- Installed power: 690 hp (510 kW)
- Propulsion: 1 × triple expansion
- Speed: 12 knots (22 km/h; 14 mph)
- Complement: 33
- Sensors & processing systems: Asdic, unknown type
- Armament: 4 × 7.5 cm (3.0 in) cannons; 4 × 7.7 mm (0.30 in) Hotchkiss guns

HNLMS Notre Dame de France was originally a French trawler. Upon the outbreak of World War II it was requisitioned by the French Navy in September 1939 and was commissioned as a patrol boat. It was captured by the Royal Navy after the fall of France after which it was loaned to the Royal Netherlands Navy. There the ship was known as Her Netherlands Majesty's French Ship (HNMFS) Notre Dame de France, although it would officially be referred to as Her Netherlands Majesty's Ship (HNLMS) Notre Dame de France. It sailed with both the Netherlands and French flags.

== Service history ==
Notre Dame de France was commissioned into the Royal Netherlands Navy on 25 November 1940. Initially it served as a patrol ship near the British coast before receiving Asdic after which it was used as convoy escort vessel, serving as anti-submarine naval trawler. It often served alongside the other Netherlands-operated French trawler, HNLMS Jean Frederic.

The ship was returned to the Royal Navy on 15 January 1942 where it was re-commissioned as HMS Notre Dame de France on 25 January 1942. It continued its service in the Royal Navy until December 1945 upon which it was returned to its pre-war owner.
