= Cugnon =

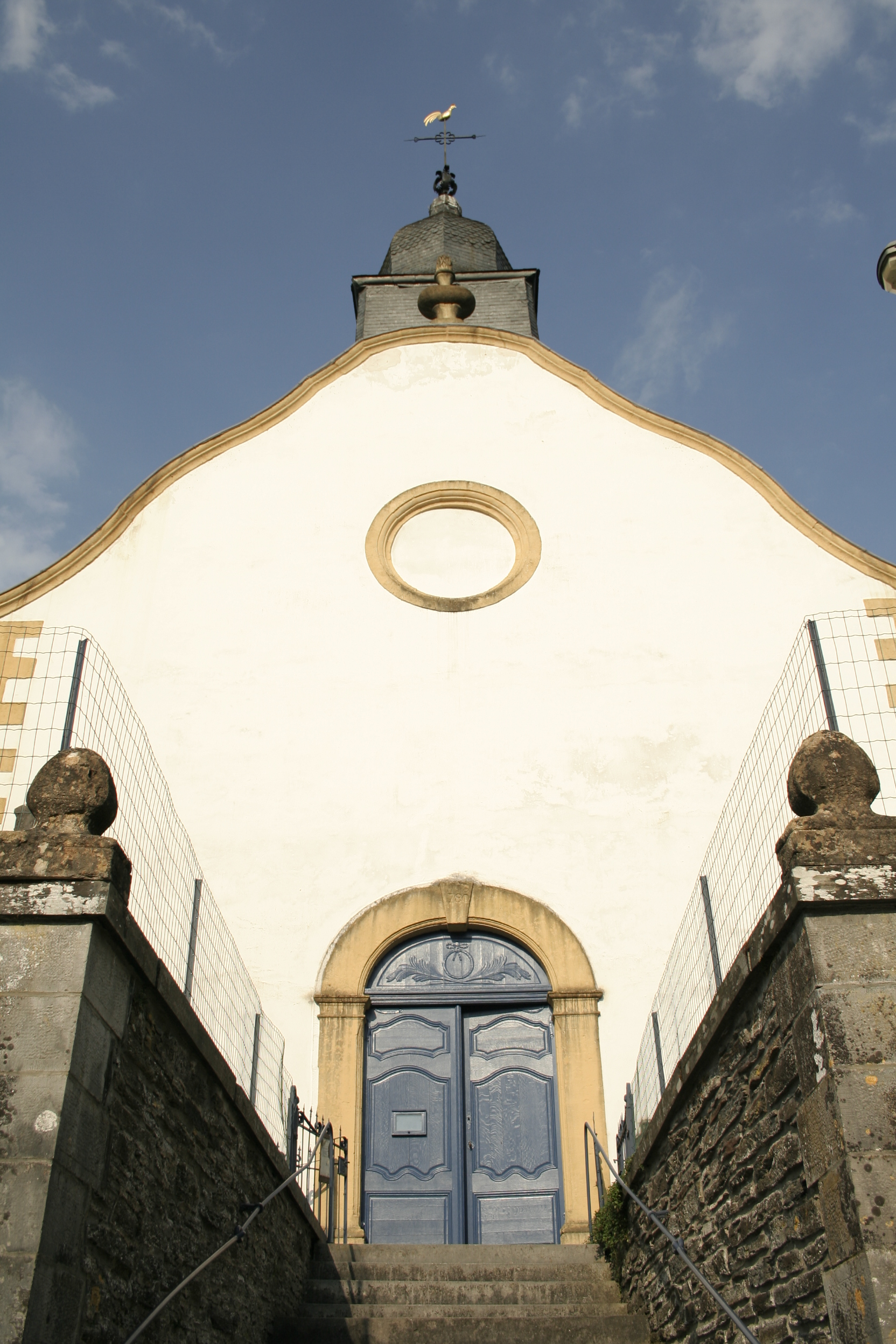

- Location in Belgium
- Country: Belgium
- Region: Wallonia
- Province: Luxembourg
- Municipality: Bertrix
- Postal codes: 6880
- Area codes: 087

Cugnon (French pronunciation: [kyɲɔ̃]) is a village of Wallonia and a district of the municipality of Bertrix, located in the province of Luxembourg, Belgium.

== History ==
It was a municipality in its own right before a merger in 1977. Cugnon merged under the French regime with Auby-sur-Semois, Géripont and Mortehan. It was separated from Auby-sur-Semois on 30 July 1899 and in 1964 annexed the hamlet of Thibauroche, detached from Muno.

== Etymology ==
Cugnon comes from the following:

Chez (Latin casae “at home” = French chez) Congidunus (Celtic surname, cf. the Breton king Cogidunus cited by Tacitus in Agricola, or the Gallic Conconnetodunnus, cited by L. Roger; this name contains the Gallic duno “pregnant” and the Celtic adjective connios “clever, end”).

== Notable people ==
- Hubert Pierlot was born in Cugnon
