= Jehonville Air Base =

- IATA: none; ICAO: EBBX

Summary
- Airport type: Military
- Operator: Belgian Air Force
- Location: Bertrix, Belgium
- Elevation AMSL: 1,503 ft (458 m)
- Coordinates: 49°53′30″N 005°13′26″E

Map
- Location in Belgium

Runways
Direction	Length		Surface
Direction	m	ft	Surface
06/24	2,825	9,268	Concrete
- Sources: Belgian AIP

Jehonville Air Base, also known as Bertrix Air Base, (ICAO: EBBX) is a NATO reserve airfield located 4 km (2.5 miles) north of Bertrix, in Belgium. It is operated by the Belgian Air Force even though there are no regular operations at that field, and it is home to the Belgian Air Cadets. The base was constructed in 1958 to meet a NATO desire to increase its force dispersal to be able to resist massive unexpected aerial attack and retain the ability to launch a retaliatory attack. It was one of four European bases that was assigned to the No. 422 Squadron RCAF of the 1 Canadian Air Division under NATO plan MC 60, and the airfield became operational on 29 August 1958. Aviation operations started on 31 December 1958, despite construction not being completed until the next year. The base was constructed to NATO standards of 2,400 metres (7,900 ft), and was later extended by another 200 metres (660 ft) on each end, making the total length 2,800 metres (9,200 ft).

The Royal Canadian Air Force deployed 422 Sqn to the base, which operated the Canadair Sabre aircraft, along with a 16-person security detachment. It was used as a Deployed Operating Base by the squadron, and in 1963 the squadron replaced the Sabres with the Canadair CF-104 Starfighter.

In February 1966, France withdrew from the NATO Military Command Structure but remained within the organization. De Gaulle also ordered all foreign military personnel to leave France within a year. As a result of this, the RCAF was forced to leave the airfield. They provided a one-year notice of departure to the Belgian Government, ceased flying operations, and reduced their security forces at the site. After the Canadians left the field, it was returned to the Belgian Armed Forces.

Upgrades continued to be made to the base even though there have not been units regularly deployed there. In 1991, the United States Army constructed an ammunition depot on the eastern side of the base, and in 1994 the depot was returned to the Belgian Armed Forces, who manages the site with the 260th Ammunitions Company (260 Cie Mun) based nearby.

A military railroad connects the base to the national rail network, and the airfield is primarily used for training, including night helicopter operations and tactical landing trainings of the Airbus A400M Atlas military transport aircraft.

== See also ==
- List of airports in Belgium
