= HNLMS Jean Frederic =

World War II Dutch patrol ship

History

Netherlands
- Name: Jean Frederic
- Builder: Lobnitz & Company
- Laid down: 1919
- Launched: 9 September 1919
- Commissioned: 25 November 1940 (Royal Netherlands Navy)
- Out of service: 1 May 1941
- Renamed: HMT James Hulbert (1919) (Royal Navy service); James Hulbert (1919–1920); M.J.Reid (1920–1922)
- Fate: Sunk from near misses during air attack

General characteristics
- Type: Anti-submarine naval trawler
- Displacement: 329 t (324 long tons) standard
- Length: 42.30 m (138 ft 9 in)
- Beam: 7.22 m (23 ft 8 in)
- Draught: 4.8 m (15 ft 9 in)
- Installed power: 600 hp (450 kW)
- Propulsion: 1 × triple expansion
- Speed: 10.5 knots (19.4 km/h; 12.1 mph)
- Complement: 39
- Sensors & processing systems: Asdic, unknown type
- Armament: 4 × 7.5 cm (3.0 in) cannons; 4 × 7.7 mm (0.30 in) Hotchkiss guns; 2 x 0.5 mm (0.020 in) Machine Guns

HNLMS Jean Frederic was originally a Mersey-class naval trawler constructed for use in the First World War. The ship would however not be completed before the war's end and get completed as a fishing trawler instead, soon thereafter being sold off.

== Service history ==
Upon the outbreak of the Second World War Jean Frederic was requisitioned by the French Navy in September 1939 and was commissioned as a patrol boat. It was captured by the Royal Navy after the fall of France after which it was loaned to the Royal Netherlands Navy. There the ship was known as Her Netherlands Majesty's French Ship (HNMFS) Jean Frederic, although it would officially be referred to as Her Netherlands Majesty's Ship (HNLMS) Jean Frederic. It sailed with both the Netherlands and French flags.

Jean Frederic was commissioned into the Royal Netherlands Navy on 25 November 1940. Initially it served as a patrol ship near the British coast before receiving asdic after which it was used as convoy escort vessel, serving as anti-submarine naval trawler. It often served alongside the other Netherlands-operated French trawler, HNLMS Notre Dame de France, and was also serving alongside her at the time of its loss.

On 1 May 1941, the ship noted an asdic contact while escorting a convoy of 17 merchant ships together with HNLMS Notre Dame de France. Jean Frederic pursued this contact for approximately five minutes before losing contact and returning to the convoy. While underway the ship was singled out and attacked by a Luftwaffe dive bomber aircraft dropping four bombs and strafing the ship with its machine guns. While none of the bombs were direct hits, the proximity of the explosions was enough to cause the ship to start sinking. The convoy steamed on, unknowingly abandoning Jean Frederic and its crew. Only the next day rescue would arrive, too late for 25 of the crew which had perished from wounds and exhaustion by that point. Only 14 of the crew of 39 survived. Among those killed was the ship's commanding officer.
