= List of protected heritage sites in Bertrix =

This table shows an overview of the protected heritage sites in the Walloon town Bertrix. This list is part of Belgium's national heritage.

Object	Year/architect	Town/section	Address	Coordinates	Number^{?}	Image
Laundry ^{(nl)} ^{(fr)}		Bertrix	rue de Bruhaimont, tegenwoordig rue des Fanges	49.863943°N 5.252657°E	84009-CLT-0001-01 Info	
rural building ^{(nl)} ^{(fr)}		Bertrix	rue du Terme 21	49.814660°N 5.184772°E	84009-CLT-0003-01 Info	
Public washing place near the church ^{(nl)} ^{(fr)}		Bertrix		49.815377°N 5.182315°E	84009-CLT-0004-01 Info	
Church of Saint-Remi and the ensemble of the church, the graveyard around the church and its surrounding churchyard wall, town hall, an area with trees, situated between the road and the cemetery, rectory and garden around back ^{(nl)} ^{(fr)}		Bertrix		49.801976°N 5.203014°E	84009-CLT-0005-01 Info	Kerk Saint-Remi en het ensemble van de kerk, het kerkhof rond de kerk en zijn omringende kerkhofmuur, het raadhuis, een terrein met bomen, gelegen tussen de weg en de begraafplaats, pastorie en tuin er rond heen
Building Roussel, currently a farm ^{(nl)} ^{(fr)}		Bertrix	rue de la Semois n°2	49.800564°N 5.210316°E	84009-CLT-0009-01 Info	Gebouw Roussel, momenteel boerderij
Rural building situated on the Semois, currently a farm ^{(nl)} ^{(fr)}		Bertrix	rue de la Semois, n°s 9-11	49.800705°N 5.209713°E	84009-CLT-0012-01 Info	
Agricultural operation in the hamlet Mortehan, now a farm ^{(nl)} ^{(fr)}		Bertrix	rue de l'Eglise n° 30	49.799823°N 5.210025°E	84009-CLT-0014-01 Info	
Buildings are an extension of the agricultural operation ^{(nl)} ^{(fr)}		Bertrix	rue de l'Eglise n° 32, uitbreiding van n° 30	49.799889°N 5.210138°E	84009-CLT-0015-01 Info	
rural building ^{(nl)} ^{(fr)}		Bertrix	rue de Linglé n° 34, tegenwoordig rue de Linglé n° 7	49.800683°N 5.210872°E	84009-CLT-0016-01 Info	Ruraal gebouw
Building, now a farm ^{(nl)} ^{(fr)}		Bertrix	rue du Moulin n°7, tegenwoordig n° 14	49.800940°N 5.202067°E	84009-CLT-0017-01 Info	Gebouw, tegenwoordig boerderij
Agricultural operation called "sous l'Eglise" ^{(nl)} ^{(fr)}		Bertrix	rue de Linglé n° 3	49.800932°N 5.211091°E	84009-CLT-0019-01 Info	
rural building ^{(nl)} ^{(fr)}		Bertrix	place Chanoine Jean Pierlot 14	49.802415°N 5.202372°E	84009-CLT-0020-01 Info	
Rural building, now a farm ^{(nl)} ^{(fr)}		Bertrix	rue de la Chapelle 29, tegenwoordig n° 4	49.802336°N 5.203917°E	84009-CLT-0022-01 Info	
The cross and the wall of the old cemetery and the ensemble formed by the wall, the cross and the land on which they are located ^{(nl)} ^{(fr)}		Bertrix		49.800949°N 5.208853°E	84009-CLT-0023-01 Info	Het kruis en de muur van het oude kerkhof en het ensemble gevormd door de muur, het kruis en het terrein waarop zij zijn gesitueerd
Former bed of Semois area known as "la Noue" ^{(nl)} ^{(fr)}		Bertrix		49.800903°N 5.209200°E	84009-CLT-0024-01 Info	Voormalig logies van Semois en omgeving, geheten "la Noue"
The crosses of the Franco-German war cemetery and the ensemble of the cemetery and its surroundings ^{(nl)} ^{(fr)}		Bertrix		49.885381°N 5.265768°E	84009-CLT-0025-01 Info	
Totality of the castle of Gerlache, its outbuildings and the ensemble of the castle and its surroundings ^{(nl)} ^{(fr)}		Bertrix	rue de Rossart, Biourge	49.842217°N 5.325639°E	84009-CLT-0026-01 Info	
Ponds Luchy ^{(nl)} ^{(fr)}		Bertrix		49.891428°N 5.314607°E	84009-CLT-0027-01 Info	
Church of Saint Jean-Baptiste and the ensemble of the church, an avenue of beech trees and the environment ^{(nl)} ^{(fr)}		Bertrix		49.815900°N 5.181470°E	84009-CLT-0028-01 Info	Kerk Saint Jean-Baptiste en het ensemble van de kerk, de laan an beuken en de omgeving
Rural building, now a farm ^{(nl)} ^{(fr)}		Bertrix	rue de la Forteresse 15, tegenwoordig rue de la Forteresse n° 1	49.802586°N 5.202270°E	84009-CLT-0029-01 Info	
Church of Saint-Hubert ^{(nl)} ^{(fr)}		Bertrix		49.800389°N 5.210273°E	84009-CLT-0030-01 Info	Kerk Saint-Hubert
Building, now a farm ^{(nl)} ^{(fr)}		Bertrix	rue de la Semois 28, tegenwoordig n° 4)	49.800651°N 5.210261°E	84009-CLT-0031-01 Info	Gebouw, tegenwoordig boerderij
Ensemble of the houses, farms today ^{(nl)} ^{(fr)}		Bertrix	rue de la Semois n°s 5 en 7	49.800828°N 5.209602°E	84009-CLT-0032-01 Info	Ensemble van de huizen, tegenwoordig boerderijen
The collection comprising all four Marian chapels in Bertrix (including the artistic works), created by Jacques Dupuis, Roger Bastin and Guy Van Oost	1949-1950-1954-1959 Jacques Dupuis, Roger Bastin et Guy Van Oost	Bertrix			84009-CLT-0036-01 Info	

== See also ==
- List of protected heritage sites in Luxembourg (Belgium)
- Bertrix
