= Bertrix =

Municipality in Wallonia, Belgium

Bertrix Bietris (Walloon)
- Municipality
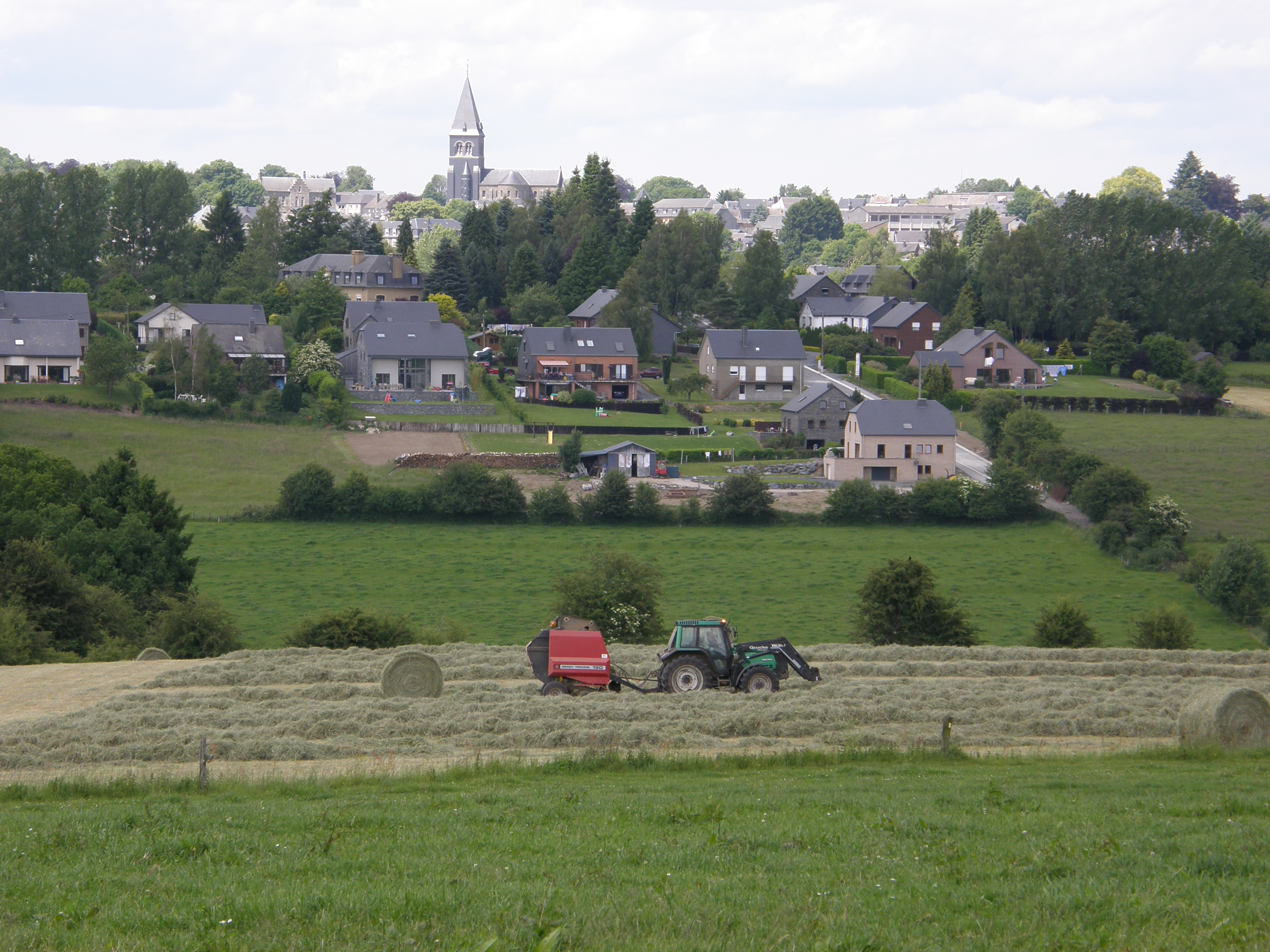

- Flag Coat of arms

- Location of Bertrix in Luxembourg province
- Interactive map of Bertrix
- Location in Belgium
- Coordinates: 49°51.25′N 5°15.2′E
- Country: Belgium
- Community: French Community
- Region: Wallonia
- Province: Luxembourg
- Arrondissement: Neufchâteau

Government
  - Mayor: Matthieu Rossignol
  - Governing party: ACTION (MR-PS)

Area
  - Total: 138.49 km^{2} (53.47 sq mi)

Population (2018-01-01)
  - Total: 8,763
  - Density: 63.28/km^{2} (163.9/sq mi)
- Postal codes: 6880
- NIS code: 84009
- Area codes: 061
- Website: (in French) bertrix.be

Bertrix (French pronunciation: [bɛʁtʁi]; Walloon: Bietris) is a municipality of Wallonia located in the province of Luxembourg, Belgium.

On 1 January 2007 the municipality, which covers 137.7 km^{2}, had 8,164 inhabitants, giving a population density of 59.3 inhabitants per km^{2}.

Bertrix is home to the NATO reserve Jehonville Air Base.

== Geography ==
The municipality consists of the following districts: Auby-sur-Semois, Bertrix, Cugnon, Jehonville, and Orgeo.

Other population centers include:

- Acremont
- Assenois
- Biourge
- Blanchoreille
- Glaumont
- La Flèche
- La Géripont
- Luchy
- Mortehan
- Nevraumont
- Rossart
- Sart
- Thibauroche

=== Climate ===
Climate data for Bertrix
Month	Jan	Feb	Mar	Apr	May	Jun	Jul	Aug	Sep	Oct	Nov	Dec	Year
Mean daily maximum °C (°F)	2 (36)	4 (40)	7 (44)	12 (54)	17 (63)	21 (69)	21 (70)	21 (69)	18 (64)	12 (54)	7 (44)	3 (37)	12 (54)
Mean daily minimum °C (°F)	−4 (24)	−3 (27)	−2 (29)	2 (36)	7 (44)	9 (48)	10 (50)	10 (50)	7 (45)	4 (40)	1 (33)	−3 (26)	3 (38)
Average precipitation mm (inches)	91 (3.6)	41 (1.6)	61 (2.4)	61 (2.4)	58 (2.3)	79 (3.1)	110 (4.4)	81 (3.2)	66 (2.6)	120 (4.7)	84 (3.3)	100 (4.1)	960 (37.8)
Source: Weatherbase

== Transport ==
Bertrix railway station, in the east of the town, has regular train services to Libramont, Dinant and Virton. On week-days trains run via Virton and Aubange to Arlon.

== Twin towns ==
Bertrix is twinned with:

- Charmes (France) (since 1968)
- Rusca Montana (Romania) (since 1990)
- Church Point, Louisiana (United States) (since 1992)

== Image gallery ==
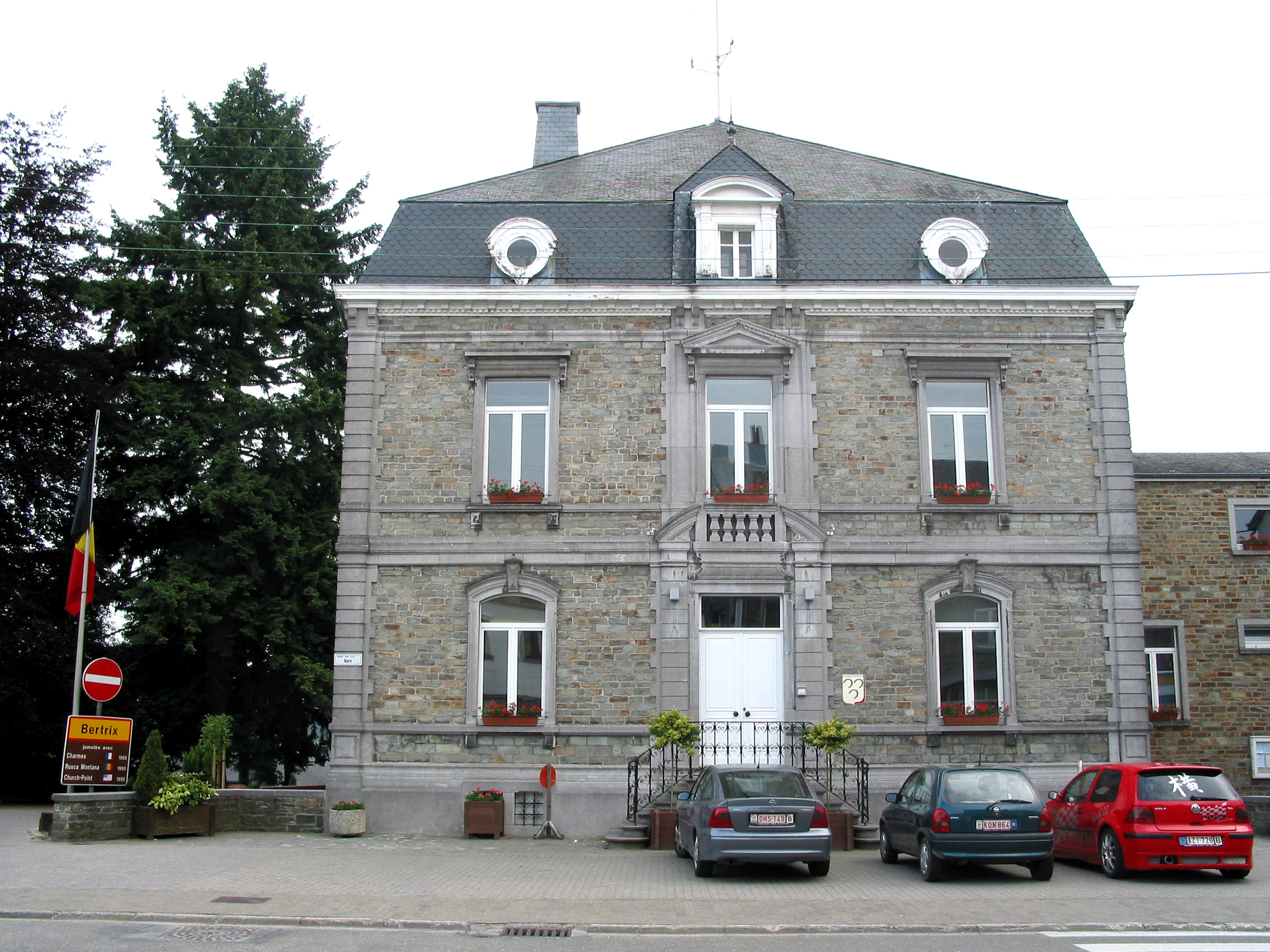
The town hall

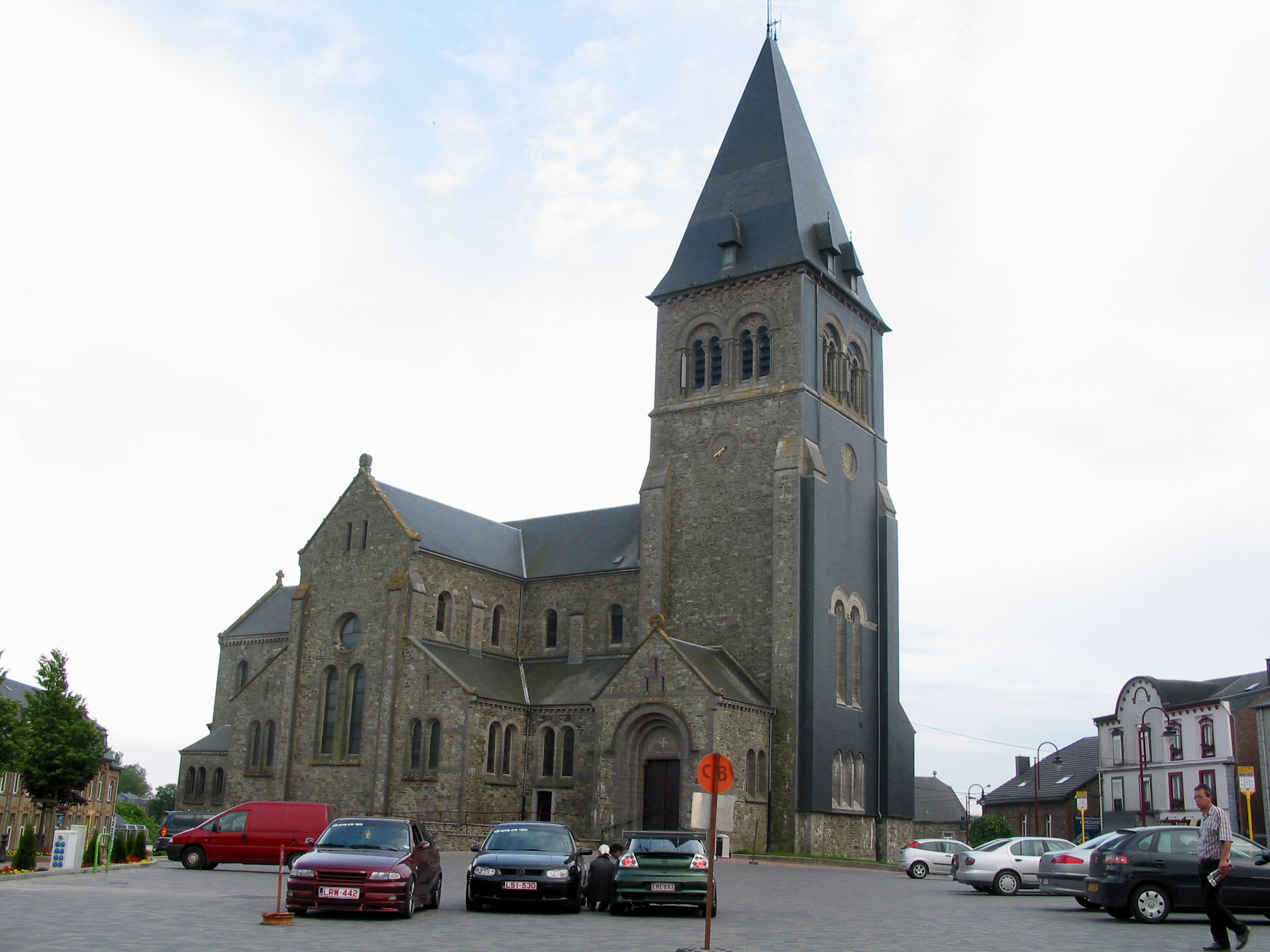
Bertrix: St Stephen's Church

== See also ==
- List of protected heritage sites in Bertrix
