= Belgian ship A4 =

Belgian naval trawler

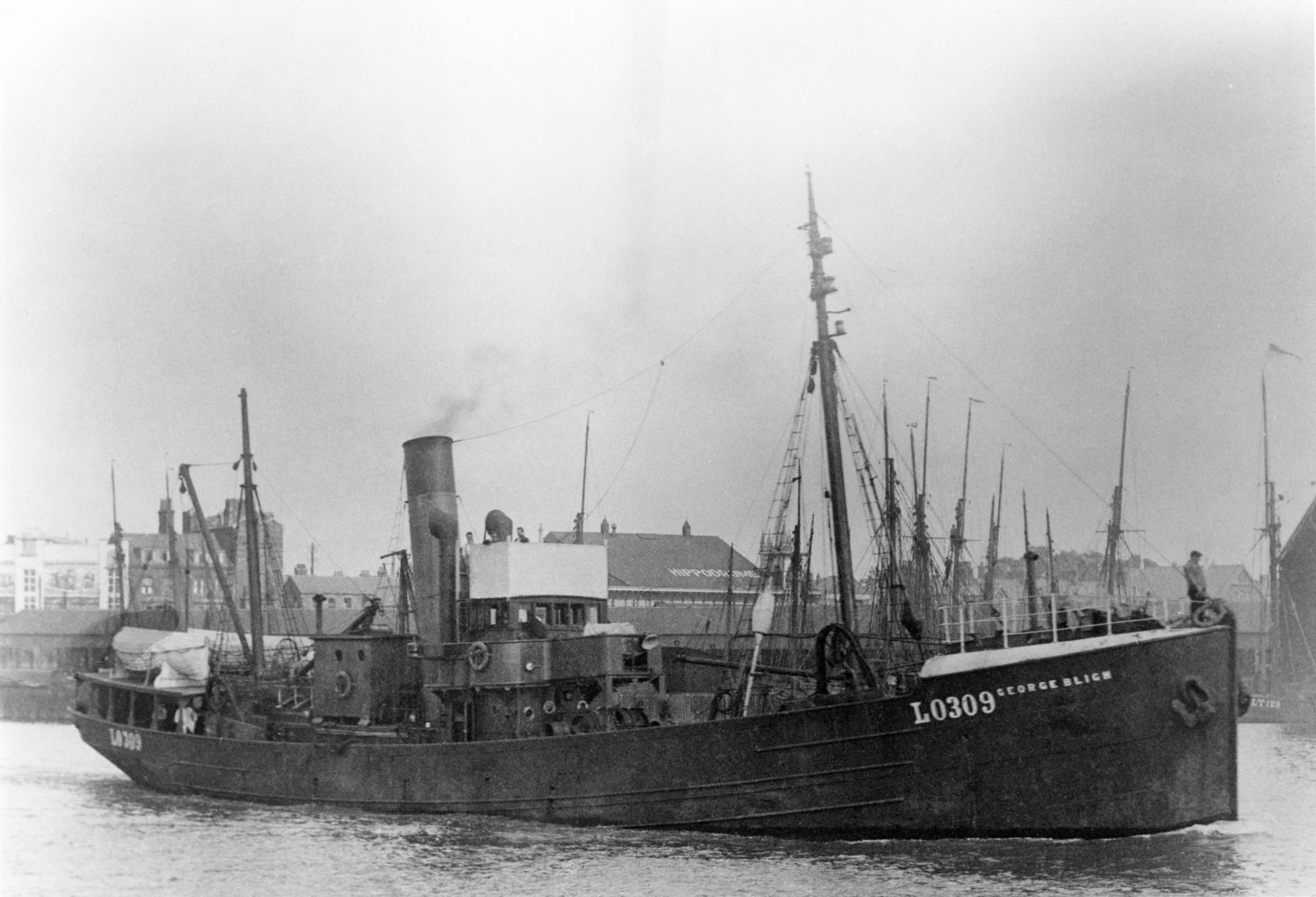
- Sister ship George Bligh

History

United Kingdom
- Name: John Ebbs
- Ordered: 1916
- Builder: Cochranes, Selby
- Launched: 2 October 1917
- Out of service: 1920
- Fate: Sold to Belgium

Belgium
- Name: Pilote 4 (1920–1939, 1946); Patrouilleur A4 (1939–1945)
- Acquired: 1920
- Decommissioned: 1946
- Fate: Scrapped in Spain, 1948

General characteristics
- Class & type: Mersey-class trawler
- Displacement: 339 t (334 long tons)
- Length: 45 m (147 ft 8 in)
- Draught: 4.5 m (14 ft 9 in)
- Installed power: 600 hp (450 kW)
- Speed: 9 to 10 knots (17 to 19 km/h; 10 to 12 mph)

General characteristics Royal Navy
- Armament: 1 × 5.4 kg (12 lb) gun; 1 × 89 mm (3.5 in) bomb thrower

General characteristics Belgian Navy
- Complement: 27
- Armament: 1 × 47 mm (1.9 in) gun; 2 × Maxim machine guns

Patrol vessel A4 (French: Patrouilleur A4) was a small Mersey-class trawler operated by Belgium during the Second World War. Originally built for the British Royal Navy, as HMS John Ebbs, the ship is notable for her role in evacuating Belgian gold reserves to England during the Battle of Belgium in May 1940. The success of the operation not only allowed the Belgian government in exile to fund its operations but deprived the German occupiers of an important asset to support their war effort. After the Belgian surrender, the vessel and her crew interned themselves in neutral Spain. Both crew and vessel were released in 1946 and A4 was scrapped soon afterwards.

== Construction ==
Pilote 4 (later renamed Patrouilleur A4) was purchased by the Belgian Corps de Marine in 1920, having previously served in the British Royal Navy during the First World War as HMS John Ebbs (FY3566). She was a Mersey-class naval trawler, built by Cochranes in Selby, North Yorkshire, and was launched on 2 October 1917.

== Specifications and design ==
Displacing 339 tonnes (334 long tons), the vessel was 45 metres (147 ft 8 in) long, and had a draught of 4.5 metres (14 ft 9 in). Fitted with engines that were capable of producing 600 horsepower (450 kW), she could travel at between 9 and 10 knots (17 and 19 km/h; 10 and 12 mph). With a complement of 27, the Belgians armed the ship with two Maxim machine guns on the bridge and a 47 mm (1.9 in) gun at the stern.

== Service history ==
In 1939, A4 was waiting to be scrapped, but the deteriorating international situation caused by German expansionism led to her reactivation by the Ministry of National Defence.

Because of Belgium's neutral status in the early stages of the Second World War, A4 had large Belgian tricolours painted on each side of the hull, as well as the word "BELGIË" (Dutch for "Belgium") in white, to prevent her being mistaken for a belligerent ship. After Belgium was invaded by German forces on 10 May 1940, she was not repainted.

During the interwar period, Belgium had created a gold-based currency, called the Belga, which ran parallel to the Belgian franc. The Belga was intended for international trading and meant that the National Bank of Belgium amassed considerable gold reserves, amounting to some 600 tonnes (590 long tons; 660 short tons) by 1940.

During the escalating international tensions in the 1930s, the Belgian government began moving large amounts of gold to the United States, Great Britain and Canada, but was forced to retain some gold in the country to maintain the Belga's value.

By the time the Germans invaded Belgium in May 1940, there were still 40 tonnes (39 long tons; 44 short tons) of gold left in Belgium, held at the bank's offices in the port of Ostend. The only ship available in the area was A4, commanded by Lieutenant Van Vaerenbergh. On 19 May 1940, she was loaded with the gold and, avoiding Dunkirk which was being bombed by the Luftwaffe, headed for the British coast, accompanied by the ship P16 which was carrying refugees. After being transferred from port to port because of concerns for the safety of the cargo during unloading, the gold was landed at Plymouth on 26 May, two days before the Belgian surrender. The gold was finally deposited at the Bank of England. A4 also carried Hubert Ansiaux, the civil servant charged with overseeing the evacuation of the gold to England and the future Governor of the National Bank.

The fact that so much Belgian gold had been rescued before the German occupation allowed the Belgian government in exile to finance its own operations, unlike most other exiled governments which had to rely on British financial support.

Since Belgium had officially surrendered on 28 May and no official Belgian government yet existed in England, the crew of A4 took their ship to Bilbao in neutral Spain to avoid having to return to Belgium and become German prisoners of war. They arrived in Spain on 26 June and spent the rest of the war interned. Control of the ship was returned to Belgium in 1946 and she was scrapped in 1948.

For his role in the evacuation of the gold, Vaerenbergh was awarded the Order of Leopold II.
