= Gravatt =

Gravatt may refer to:

== People ==
- Eric Gravatt, American jazz drummer
- George Gravatt (1815–1843), officer in the British Army
- John Segar Gravatt (1909–1983), American lawyer and judge

== Geography ==
- Mount Gravatt, Queensland, a town and hill in Queensland, Australia

== See also ==
- Cravat (disambiguation)
- Gravatal
- Gravatar
- Gravataí
- Gravati
- Gravatá
- Gravit
