= Cravat =

Cravat, cravate or cravats may refer to:

- Cravat (early), forerunner neckband of the modern necktie
- Cravat, British name for what in American English is called an ascot tie
- Cravat bandage, a triangular bandage
- Cravat (horse) (1935–1954), an American Thoroughbred racehorse
- Cravat Regiment, a guard of honour in Croatia
- Croats (military unit), 17th-century light cavalry forces also known as Cravats
- La Cravate, 1957 French short film also known as Les têtes interverties
- Nick Cravat, stage name of American actor and stunt performer Nicholas Cuccia (1912–1994)
- The Cravats, an English punk rock band formed in 1977
- Yancey and Sabra Cravat, protagonists of the Edna Ferber novel Cimarron and its two film adaptations

== See also ==
- Cravath, surname
