= Gravett =

Gravett is a surname. Notable people with the surname include:

- Christopher Gravett, British historian
- Emily Gravett, English children's author and illustrator
- Hassani Gravett, American basketball player
- Mark Gravett (1865–1938), English cricketer
- Paul Gravett, London-based journalist, curator, writer and broadcaster
- Robb Gravett (born 1956), British racing driver and team owner

== See also ==
- Garravet
- Gravit
- Grivet
- Kravet
