= Radelange =

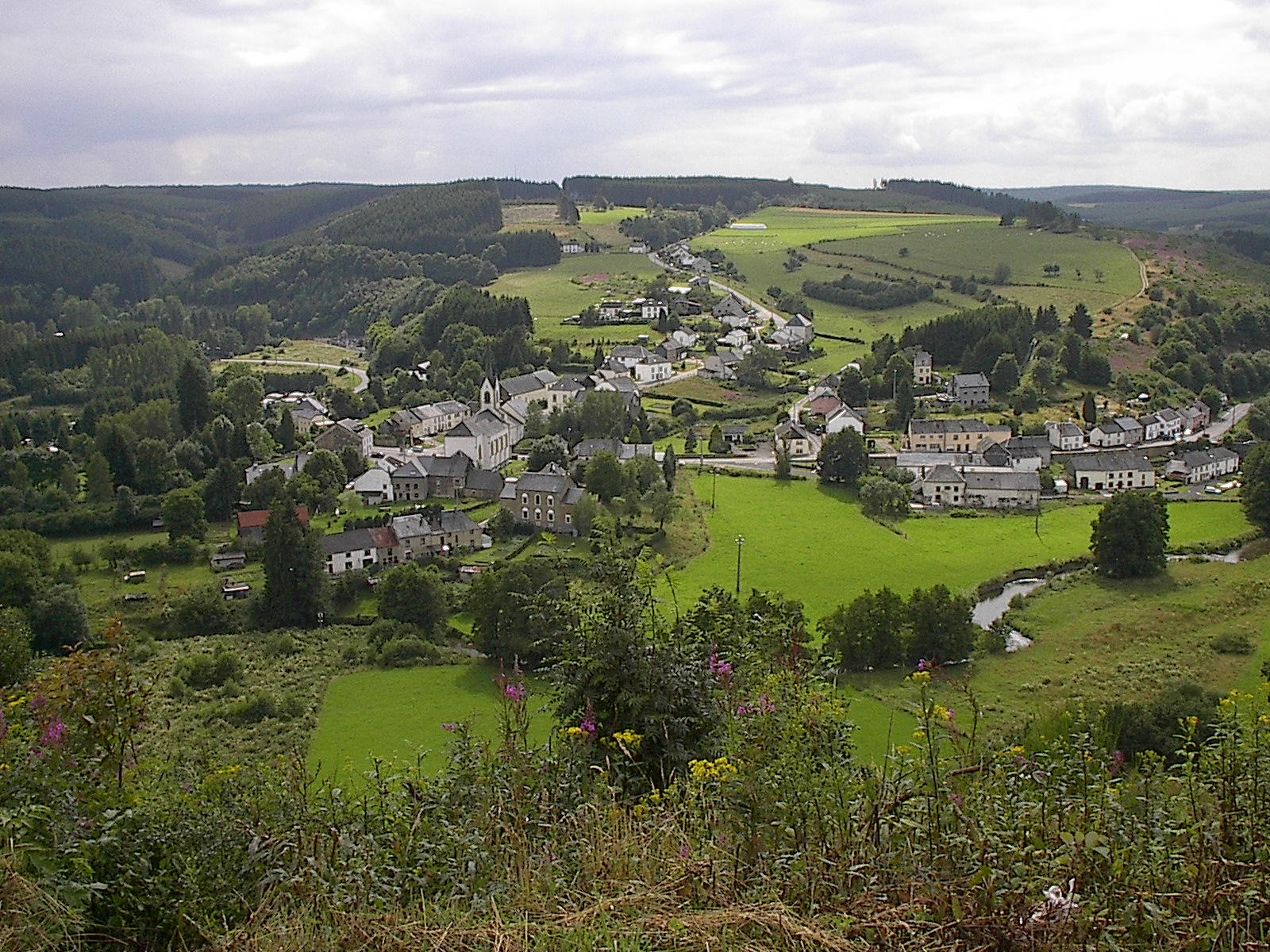
- Radelange

- Location within Belgium Location within Europe
- Coordinates: 49°50′34″N 05°43′22″E
- Country: Belgium
- Region: Wallonia
- Province: Luxembourg
- Municipality: Martelange

Radelange (French pronunciation: [ʁadlɑ̃ʒ]; German: Radelingen/Redel; Luxembourgish: Réidel) is a village of Wallonia in the municipality of Martelange, located in the province of Luxembourg, Belgium.

The village history goes back to at least 1636, when it was completely destroyed during the Thirty Years' War by Croatian mercenaries. Until the late 19th century, the village was considered poor and the inhabitants lived off agriculture and the keeping of livestock. In the 1870s, the opening of nearby quarries created more jobs. The village lies at a bend in the river Sûre. The village church dates from 1860 to 1862. There are two war memorials in the village, one commemorating the Belgian Chasseurs Ardennais, and another in memory of the first French soldiers to die on Belgian soil here during World War I, on 7 August 1914.
