= Martelange =

Municipality in Wallonia, Belgium

Martelange Måtlindje (Walloon) Maartel (Luxembourgish): Martelingen (German)
- Municipality
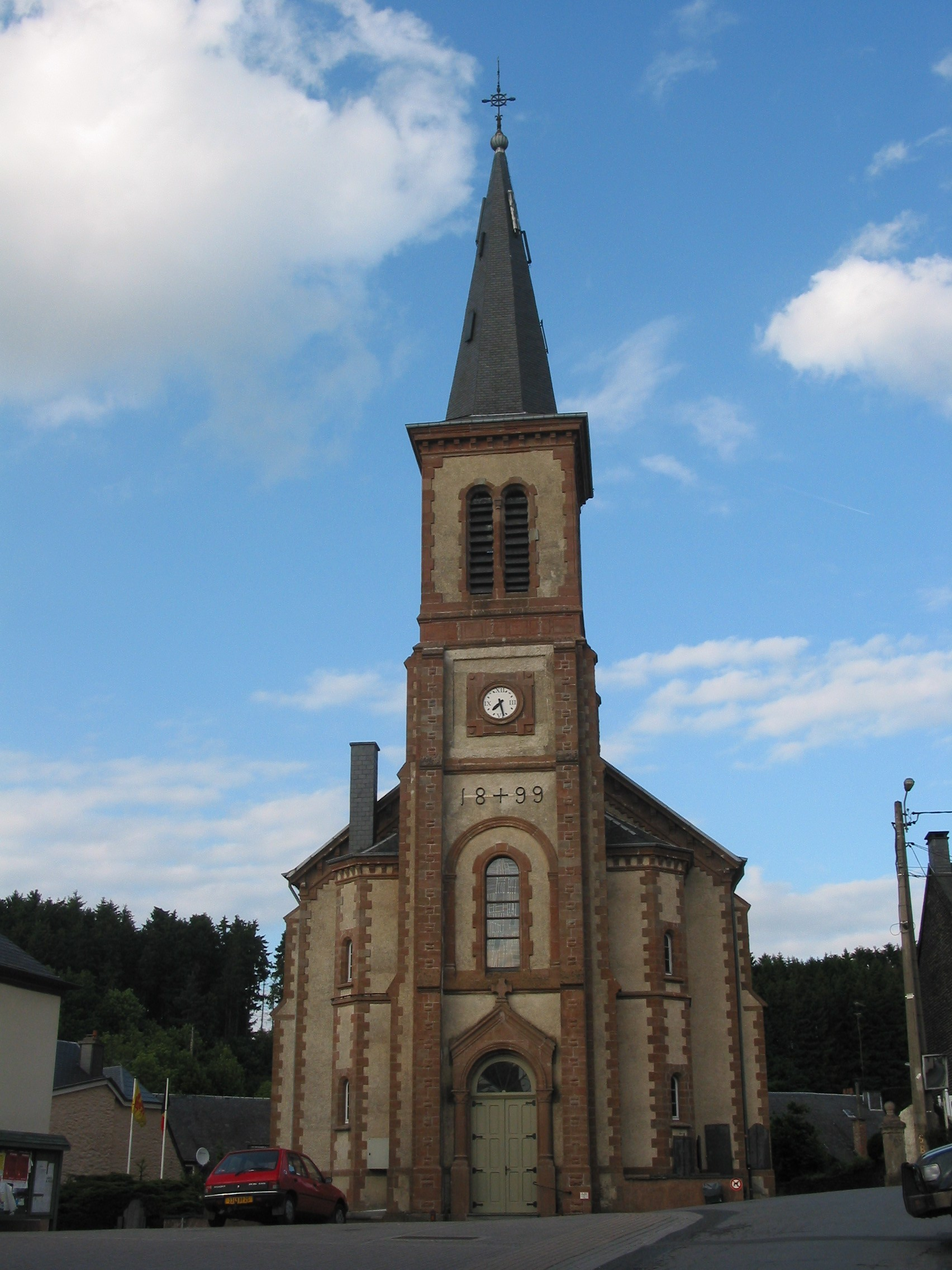
- St. Martin's church

- Location of Martelange in Luxembourg province
- Interactive map of Martelange
- Location in Belgium
- Coordinates: 49°50′N 05°44′E
- Country: Belgium
- Community: French Community
- Region: Wallonia
- Province: Luxembourg
- Arrondissement: Arlon

Government
  - Mayor: Daniel Waty (cdH, UC)
  - Governing party: UC

Area
  - Total: 29.98 km^{2} (11.58 sq mi)

Population (2018-01-01)
  - Total: 1,820
  - Density: 60.7/km^{2} (157/sq mi)
- Postal codes: 6630
- NIS code: 81013
- Area codes: 063
- Website: www.martelange.be

Martelange (French pronunciation: [maʁtəlɑ̃ʒ]; German: Martelingen [ˈmaʁtəlɪŋən]; Luxembourgish: Maartel [ˈmaːχtəl]; Walloon: Måtlindje) is a municipality of Wallonia located in the province of Luxembourg, Belgium.

On 1 January 2007 the municipality, which covers 29.67 km^{2}, had 1,584 inhabitants, giving a population density of 53.4 inhabitants per km^{2}. Besides Martelange itself, the municipality includes the villages of Grumelange and Radelange.

For some 1.8 kilometres (1.1 mi), the N4 Brussels to Arlon road, which passes through the village, forms the border with the Grand Duchy of Luxembourg. Because fuel, tobacco, and alcohol taxes are lower in Luxembourg than in Belgium, the eastern, Luxembourgish side of this stretch of road has become lined with numerous petrol stations and liquor stores.

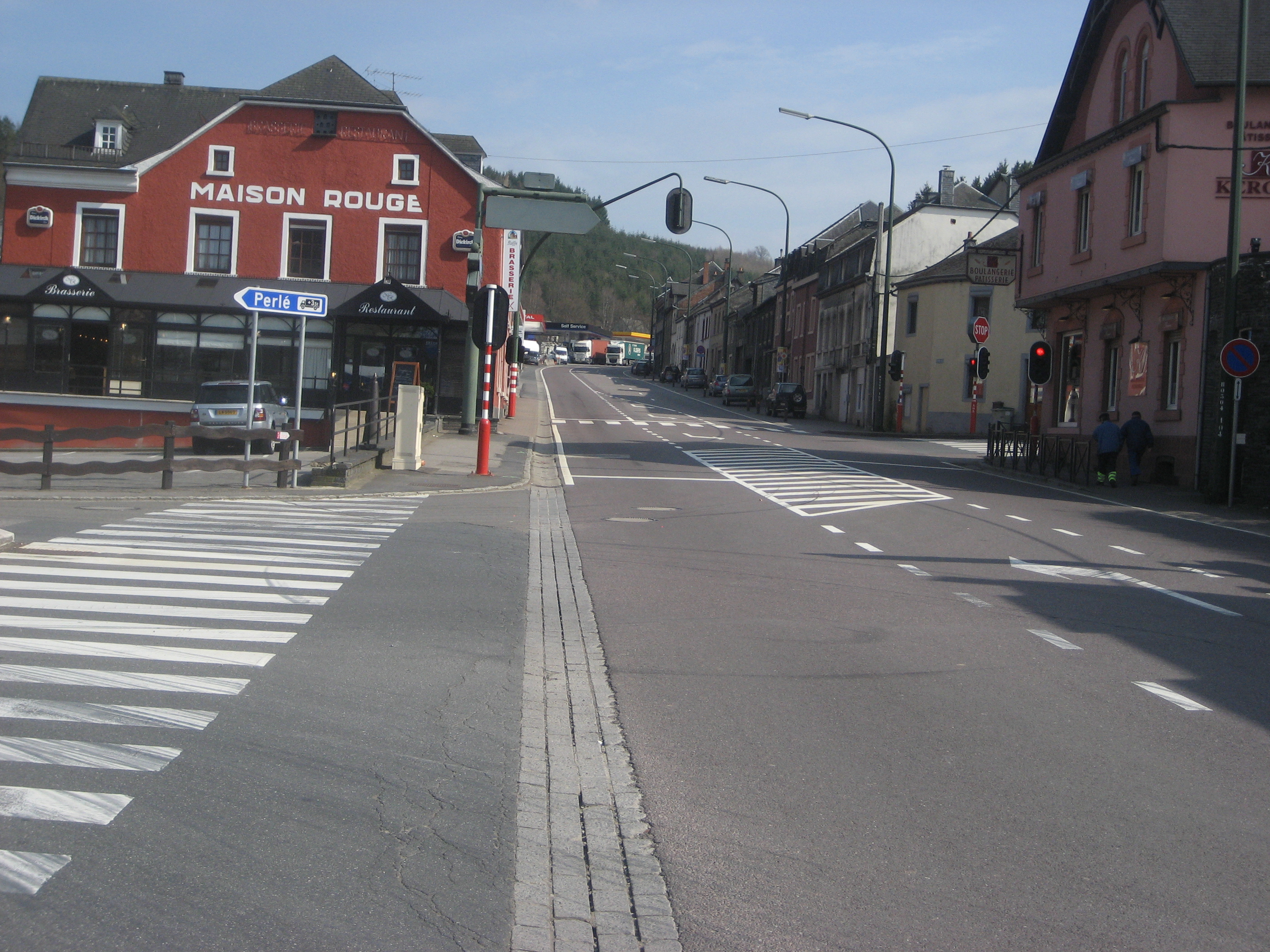
The street itself and the houses on the right side belong to Belgium, the red house and all the gas stations are on Luxembourg territory.

== History ==
Between 1830 and 1947, the town was a major slate quarrying centre, though the industry has now completely disappeared.

On 21 August 1967, a French tanker lorry containing 45,000 litres of Liquefied petroleum gas suffered from failing brakes while driving downhill. It exploded in the middle of the village, killing 22 people and injuring 54. Dozens of houses were completely destroyed.

== See also ==
- List of protected heritage sites in Martelange
