= List of protected heritage sites in Martelange =

This table shows an overview of the protected heritage sites in the Walloon town Martelange. This list is part of Belgium's national heritage.

Object	Year/architect	Town/section	Address	Coordinates	Number^{?}	Image
Brushwood, "in der Wolsch" ^{(nl)} ^{(fr)}		Martelange		49.853025°N 5.743753°E	81013-CLT-0001-01 Info	
Washing place, Grand'Rue ^{(nl)} ^{(fr)}		Martelange		49.830820°N 5.738182°E	81013-CLT-0002-01 Info	
Totality of the chapel St. Joseph de Grumelage: interior and exterior protection ^{(nl)} ^{(fr)}		Martelange		49.846297°N 5.754984°E	81013-CLT-0003-01 Info	

== See also ==
- List of protected heritage sites in Luxembourg (Belgium)
- Martelange
