= Cravat (early) =

Long strip of fine cloth wound around the neck and tied in front into a bow or knot

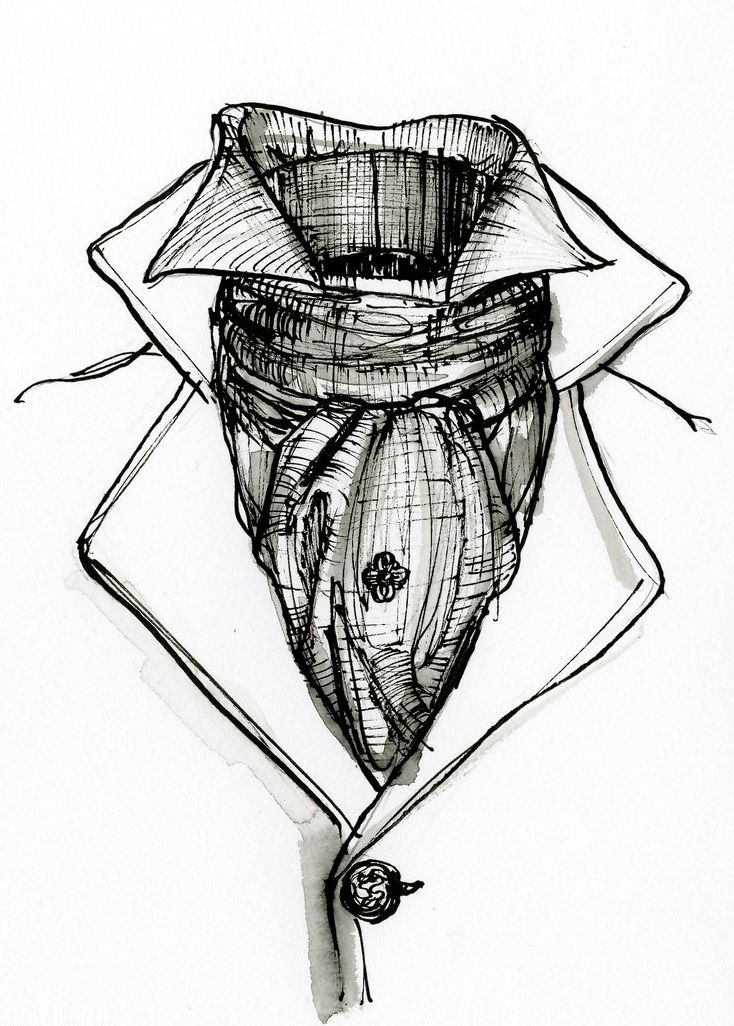
Cravat as worn in the 19th century

The cravat (/krəˈvæt/) is a neckband, the forerunner of the modern tailored necktie and bow tie, originating from a style worn by members of the 17th century military unit known as the Cravats. The modern British "cravat" is called an "ascot tie" in American English.

From the end of the 16th century, the term band applied to any long-strip neckcloth that was not a ruff. The ruff, a starched, pleated white linen strip, originated earlier in the 16th century as a neckcloth (readily changeable, to minimize the soiling of a doublet), as a bib, or as a napkin. A band could be either a plain, attached shirt collar or a detachable "falling band" that draped over the doublet collar. It is possible that initially cravats were worn to hide soil on shirts.

== History ==
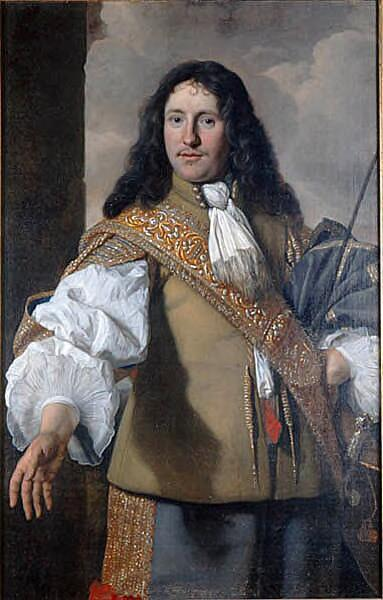
Emanuel de Geer wearing a military sash over a buff jerkin and sporting a cravat with it in 1656, portrait by Bartholomeus van der Helst

According to 1828 encyclopedic The Art of Tying the Cravat: Demonstrated in Sixteen Lessons, the Romans were the first to wear knotted kerchiefs around their necks, but the modern version of the cravat (French: la cravate) originated in the 1660s. During the Thirty Years' War, King Louis XIV of France enlisted Croatian mercenaries known for wearing a necktie called a tour de cou. The traditional Croat military kit aroused Parisian curiosity about the unusual, picturesque scarves distinctively knotted at the Croats' necks:

In 1660 a regiment of Croats arrived in France — a part of their singular costume excited the greatest admiration, and was immediately and generally imitated; this was a tour de cou, made (for the private soldiers) of common lace, and of muslin or silk for the officers; the ends were arranged en rosette, or ornamented with a button or tuft, which hung gracefully on the breast. This new arrangement, which confined the throat but very slightly, was at first termed a Croat, since corrupted to Cravat. The Cravats of the officers and people of rank were extremely fine, and the ends were embroidered or trimmed with broad lace; those for the lower classes were subsequently made of cloth or cotton, or at the best of black taffeta, plaited: Which was tied round the neck by two small strings.

An early type of cravat was already present in 16th-century Venice. It was notably worn by professional soldiers from Dalmatia. These men, called Schiavoni or Oltramarini, served as naval infantry and as a guard unit to the Doge of Venice. As part of their uniform, they wore a cravat-like scarf referred to as a fazzoletto in Venetian military archives.

Often the Dubrovnik poet Ivan Gundulić is credited with the invention of the cravat, due to a portrait hanging in the Rector's Palace, Dubrovnik. The scholar depicted in the painting looks very much like the frontispiece to his Osman published in 1844. However, considering the hairstyle, this portrait is more probably a later portrait of his namesake Dživo (Ivan) Šiškov Gundulić, also a Dubrovnik poet. In their honor, Croatia celebrates Cravat Day on October 18.

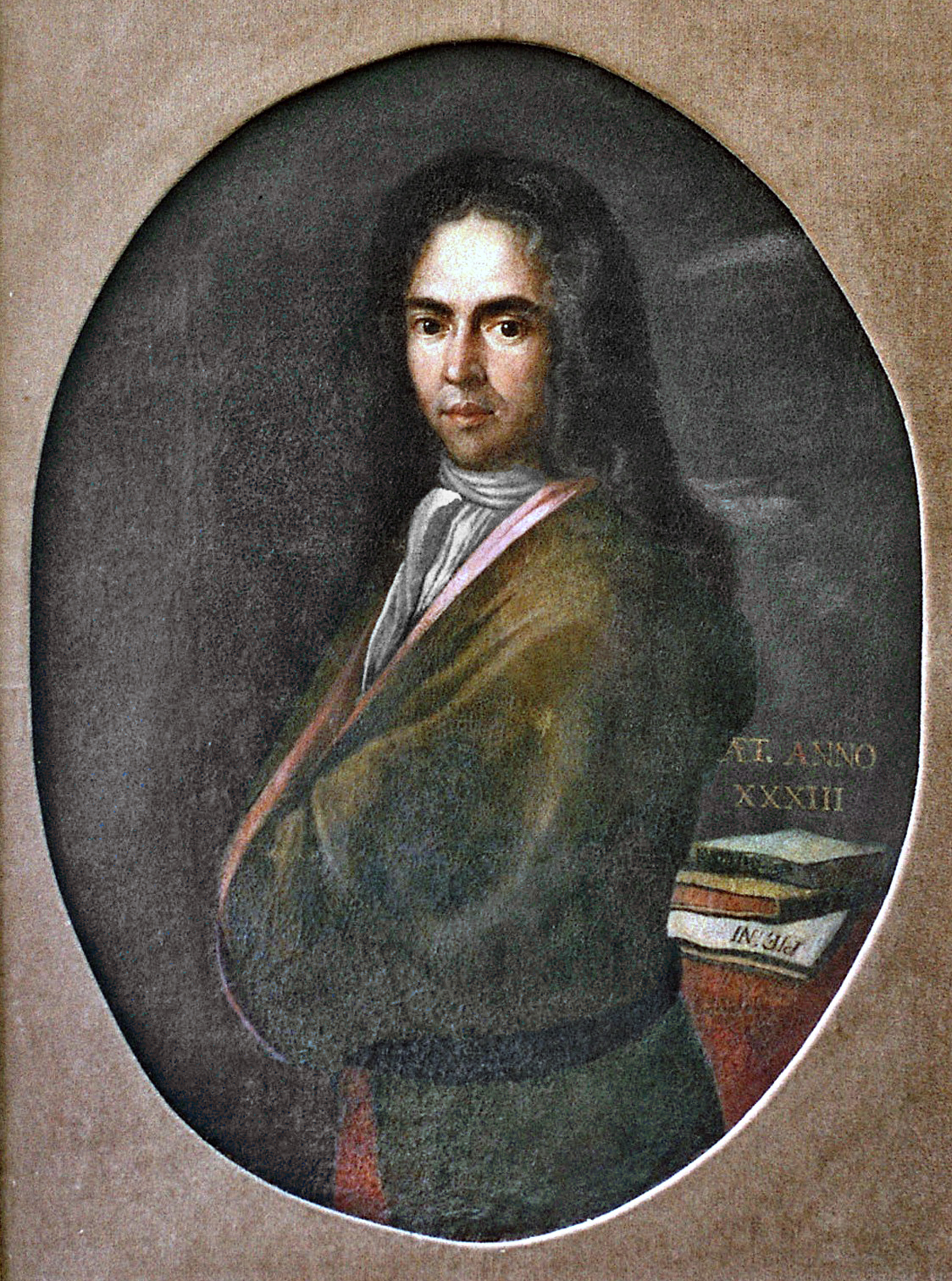
Portrait of Ivan Gundulić (1622–1630)

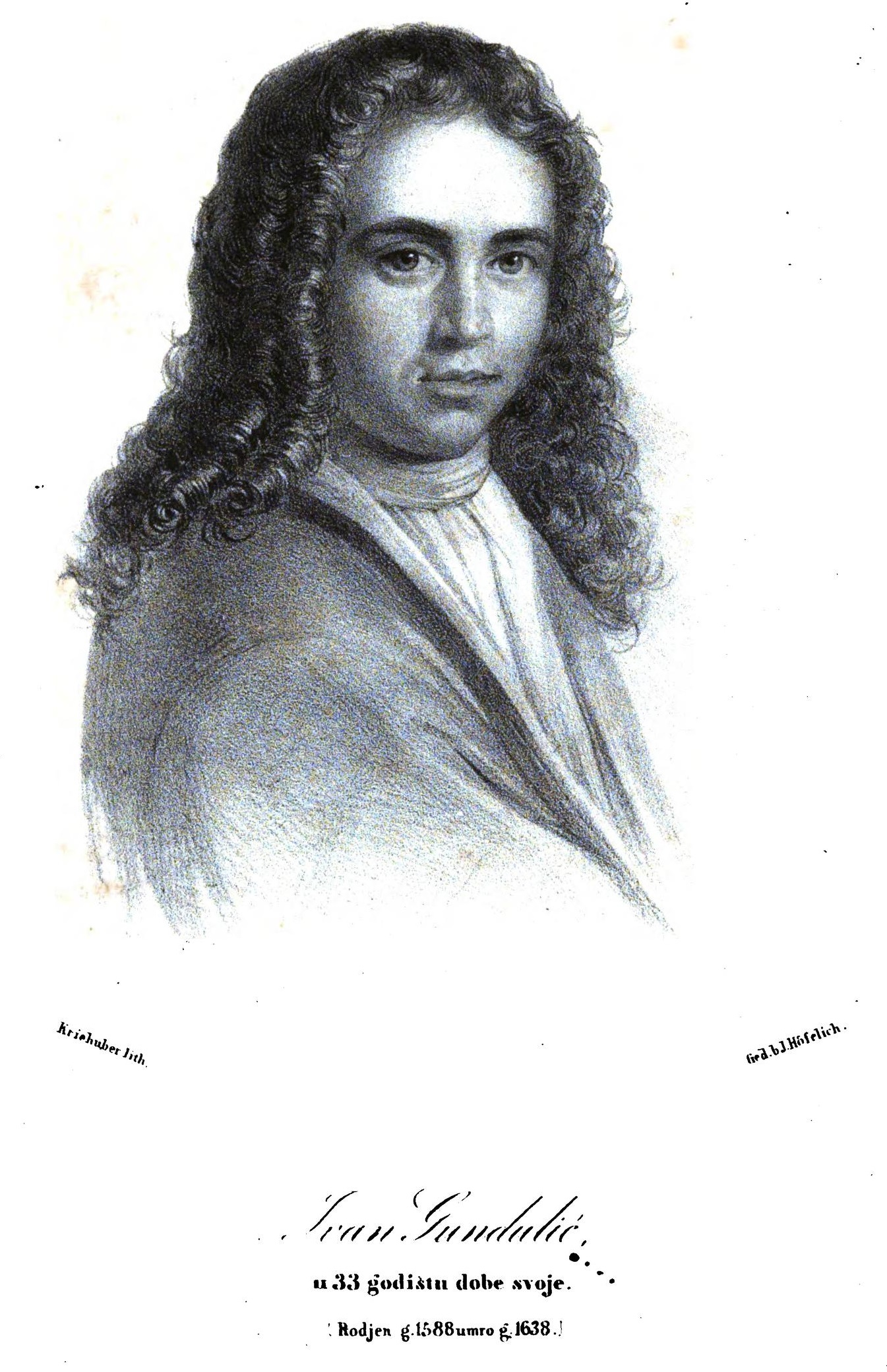
Frontispiece for Osman, 1844

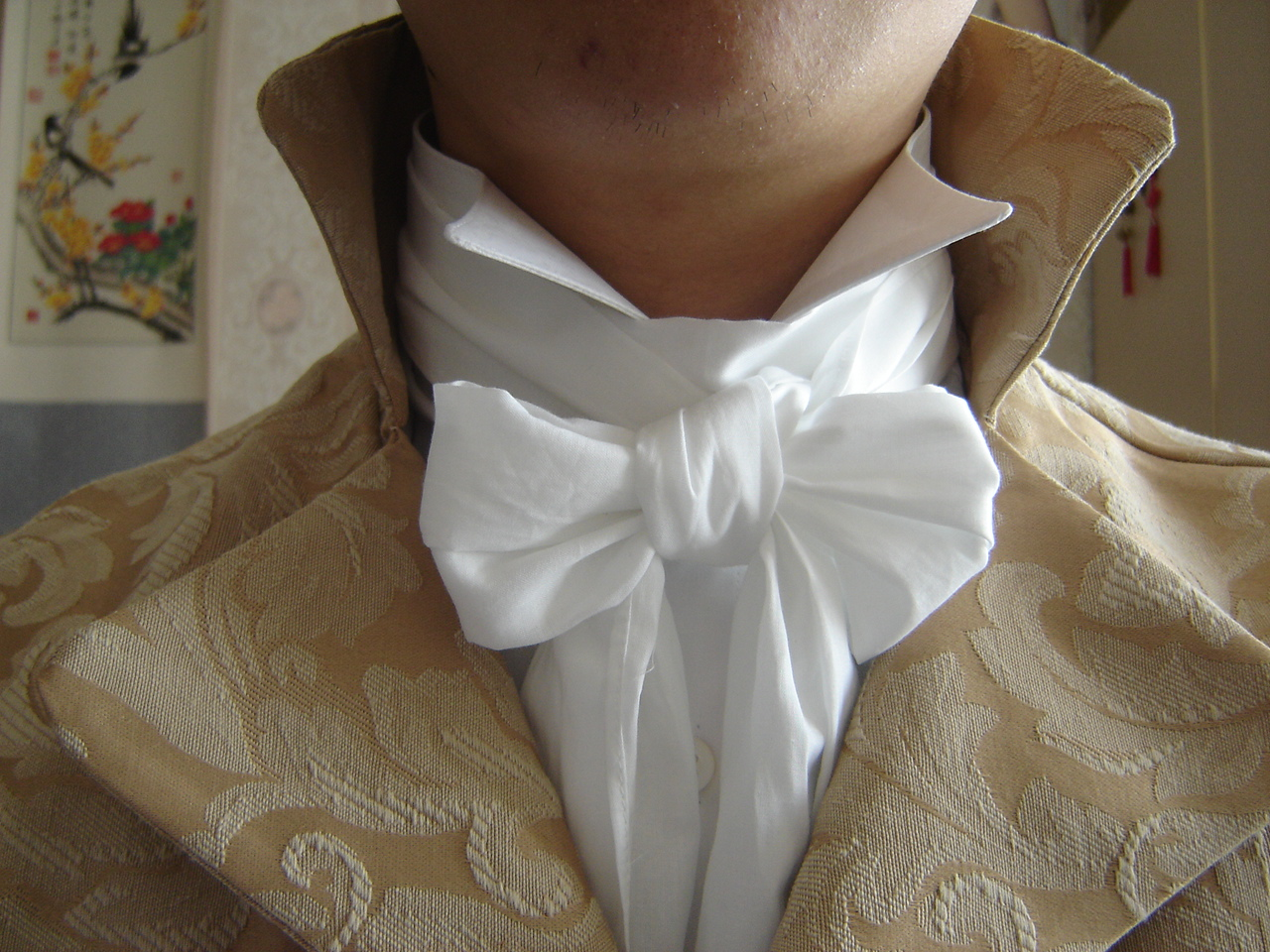
A Regency-style neckcloth tied in a bow on a Grafton collar

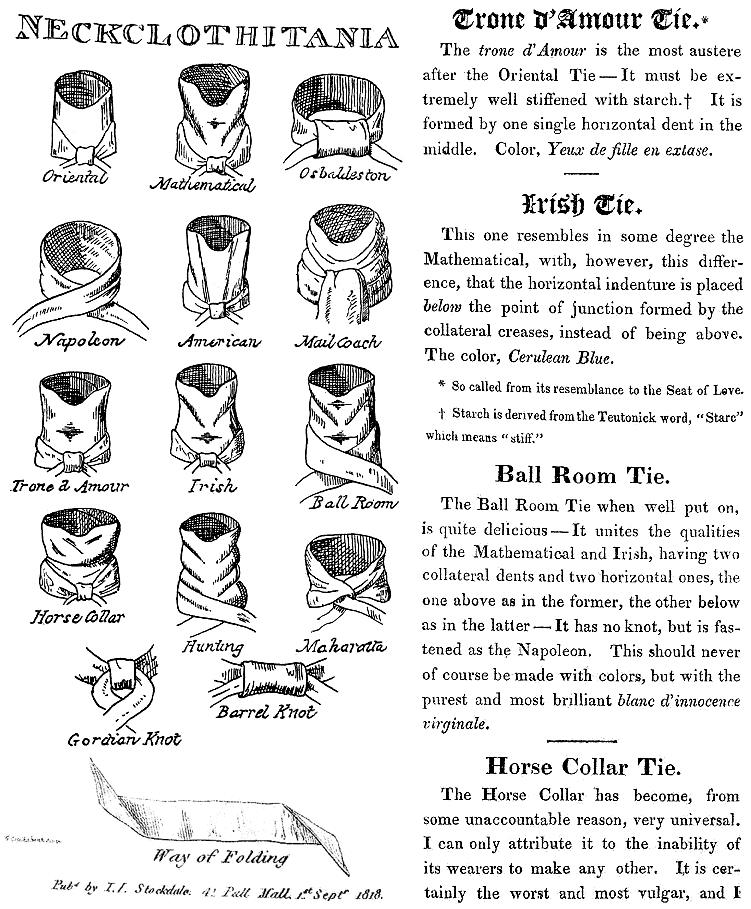
This image from the 1818 Neckclothitania shows what 14 different cravat knots look like, but includes no instructions on how to tie them.

On returning to England from exile in 1660, Charles II imported with him the latest new word in fashion: "A cravatte is another kind of adornment for the neck being nothing else but a long towel put about the Collar, and so tyed before with a Bow Knott; this is the original of all such Wearings; but now by the Art and Inventions of the seamsters, there is so many new ways of making them, that it would be a task to name, much more to describe them".

During the Nine Years' War (1688–1697), except for court, the flowing cravat was replaced with the more current, and equally military, "Steinkirk", named after the Battle of Steenkerque in 1692. The Steinkirk was a long, narrow, plain or lightly-trimmed neckcloth worn with military dress, wrapped once about the neck in a loose knot, with the lace of fringed ends twisted together and tucked out of the way into a button-hole, either of the coat or the waistcoat. It was designed to be worn in deliberate disarray. The fashion apparently began after troops at the Battle of Steenkerque had no time to tie their cravats properly before going into action. The Steinkirk was popular with men and women until the 1720s. Colley Cibber's play The Careless Husband (1704) had a famous Steinkirk Scene.

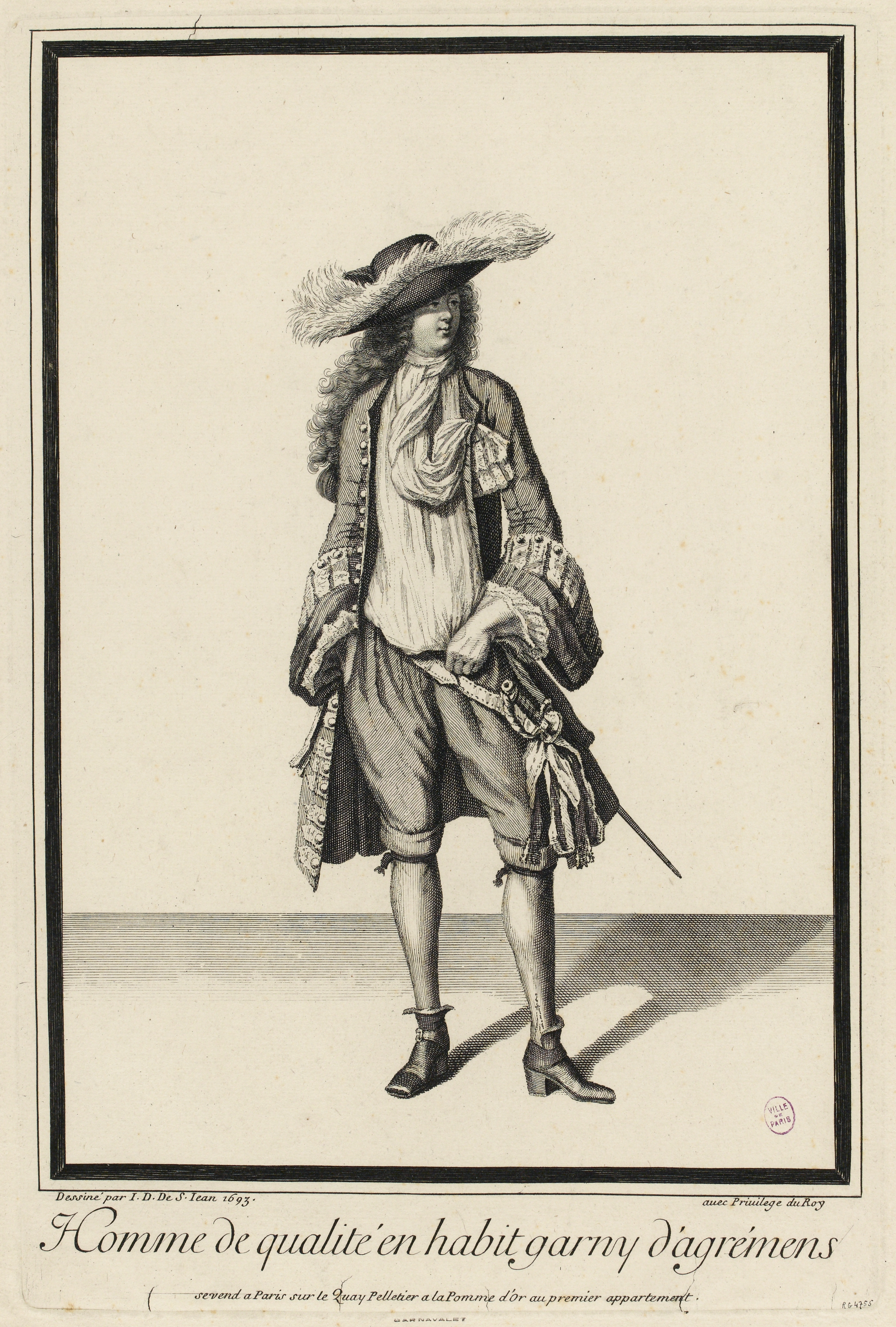
Men's Steinkirk, 1693

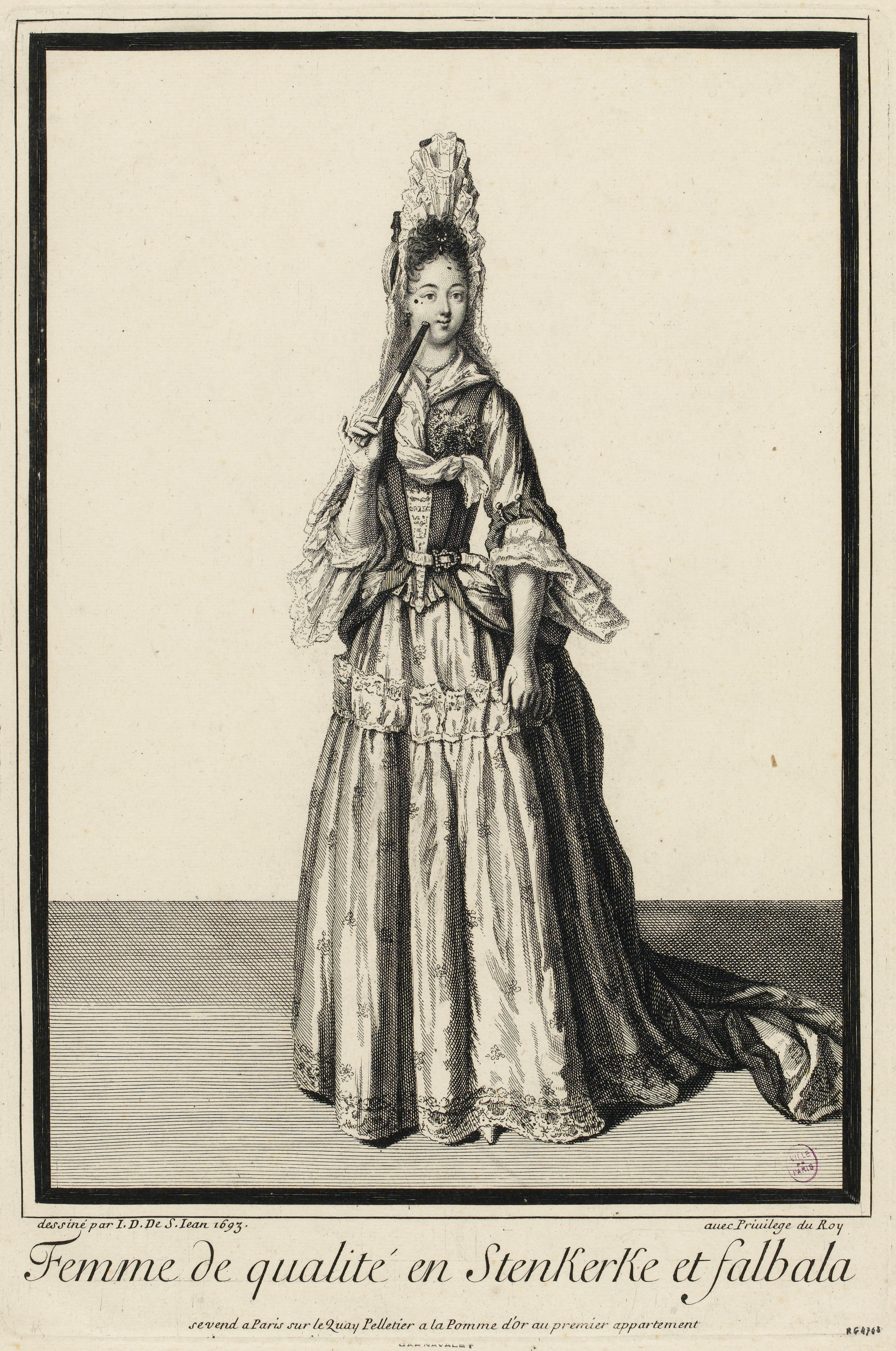
Women's Steinkirk, 1693

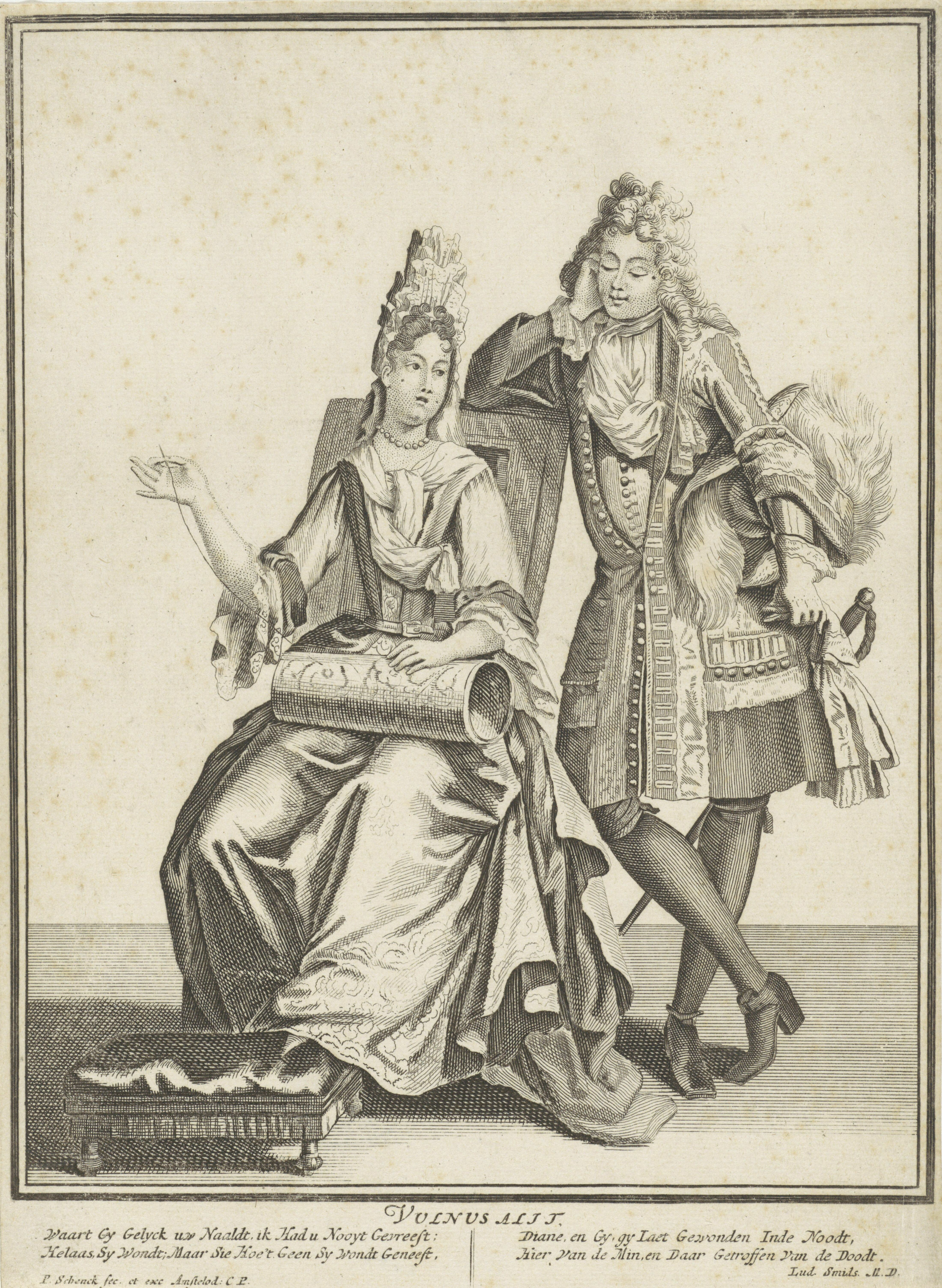
Steinkirk cravats worn by both sexes, dated circa 1690 by the museum, but more likely from circa 1692-1695

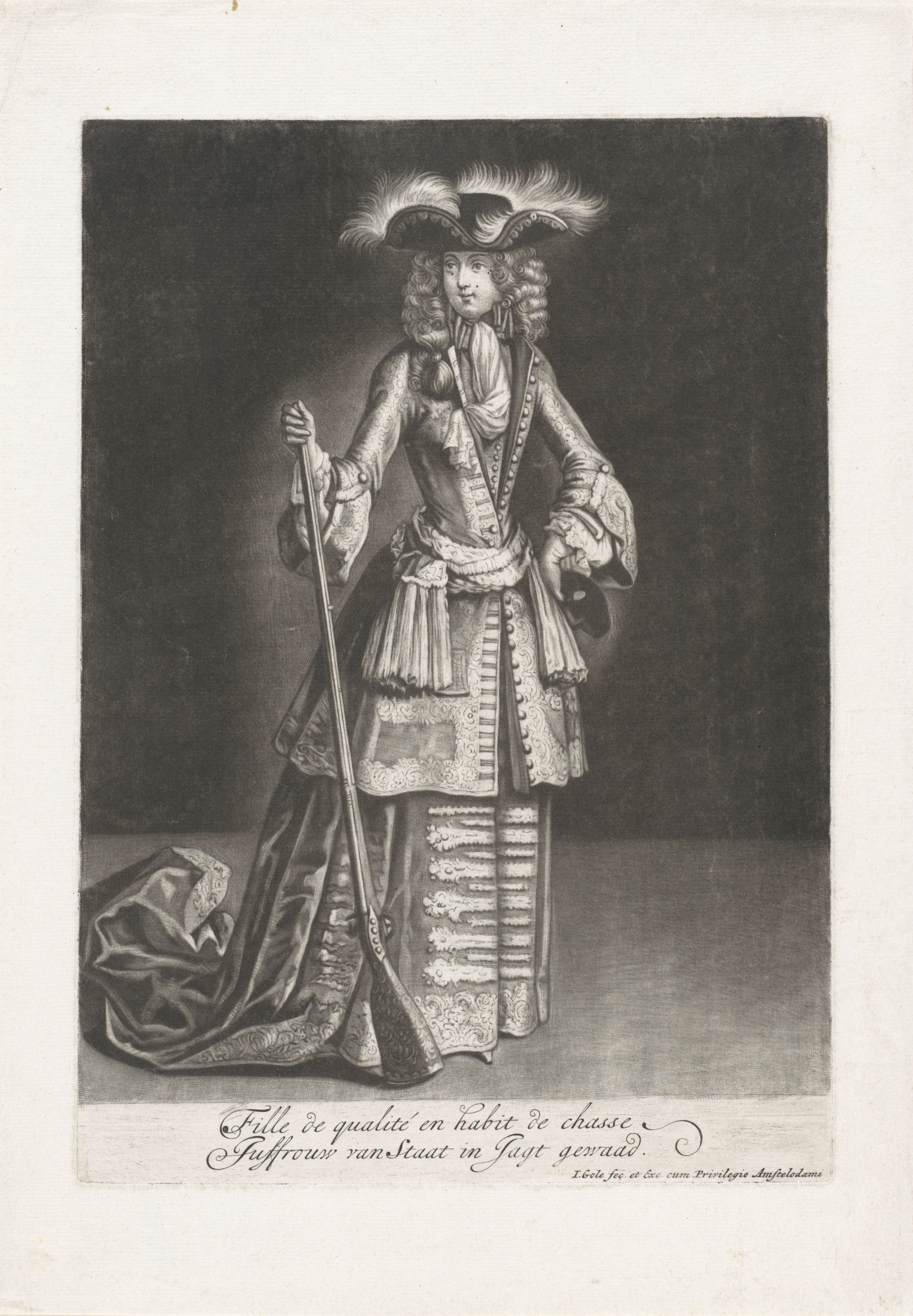
Women's Steinkirk worn with a hunting costume, 1692-1700

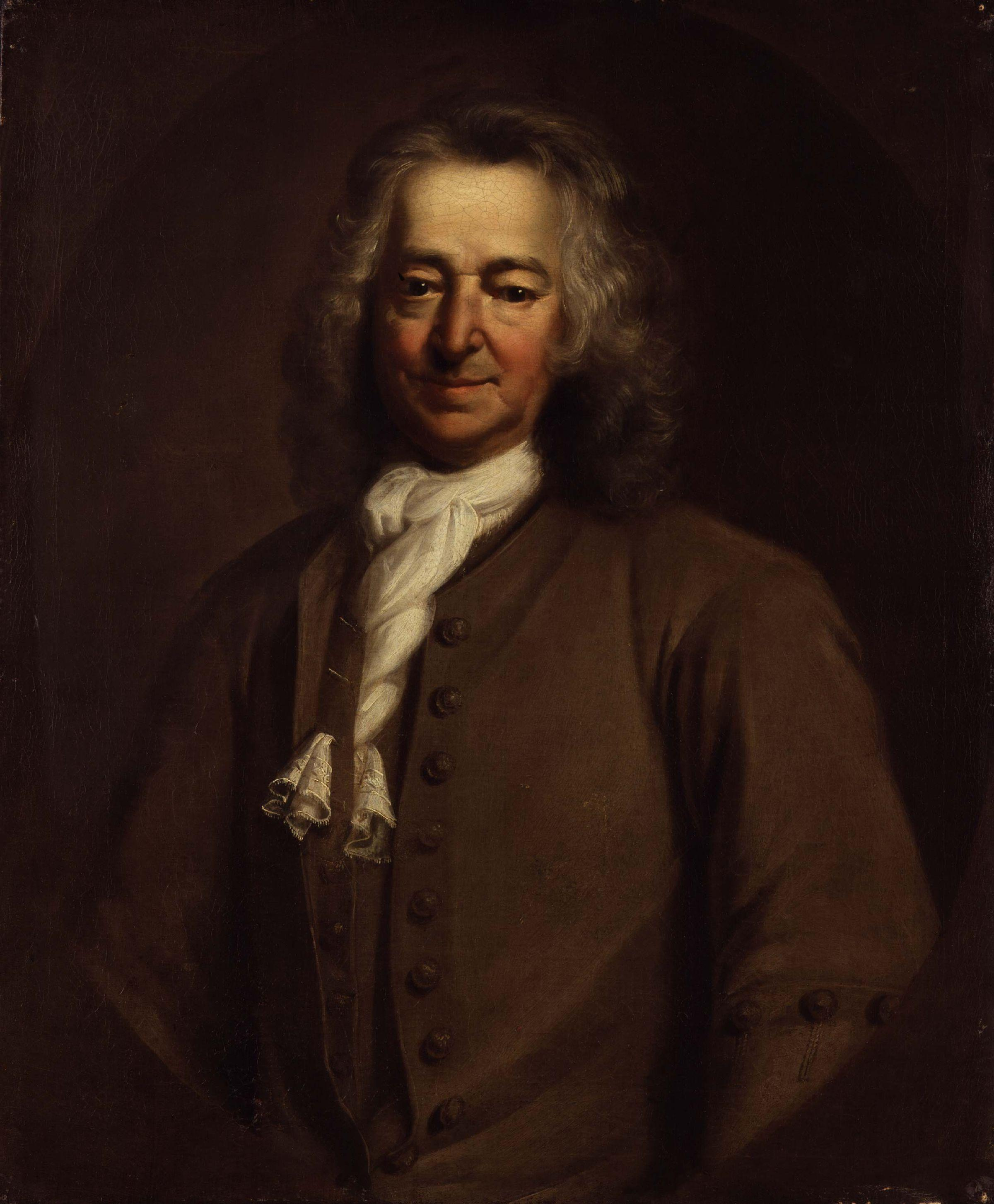
1720s

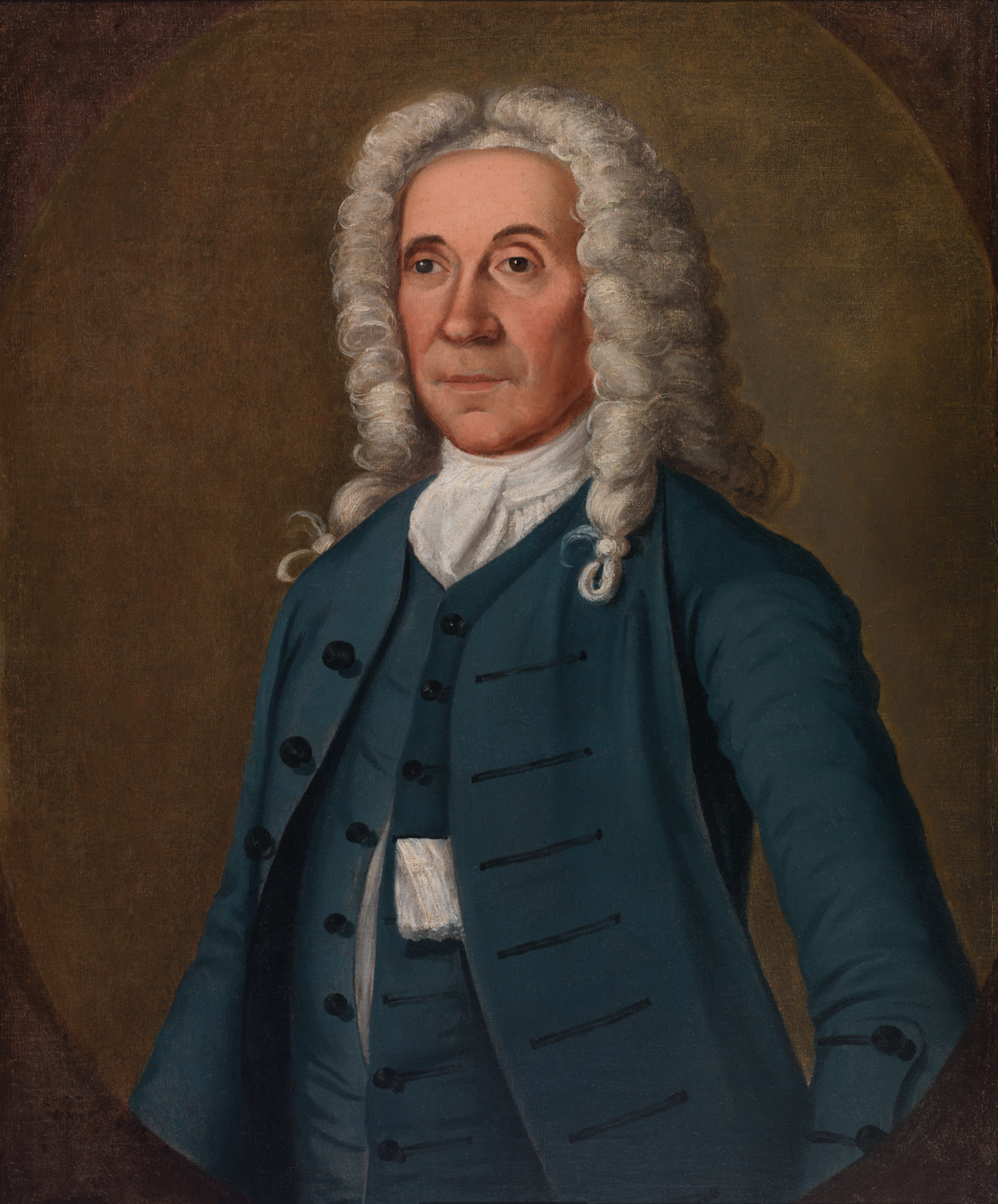
1751

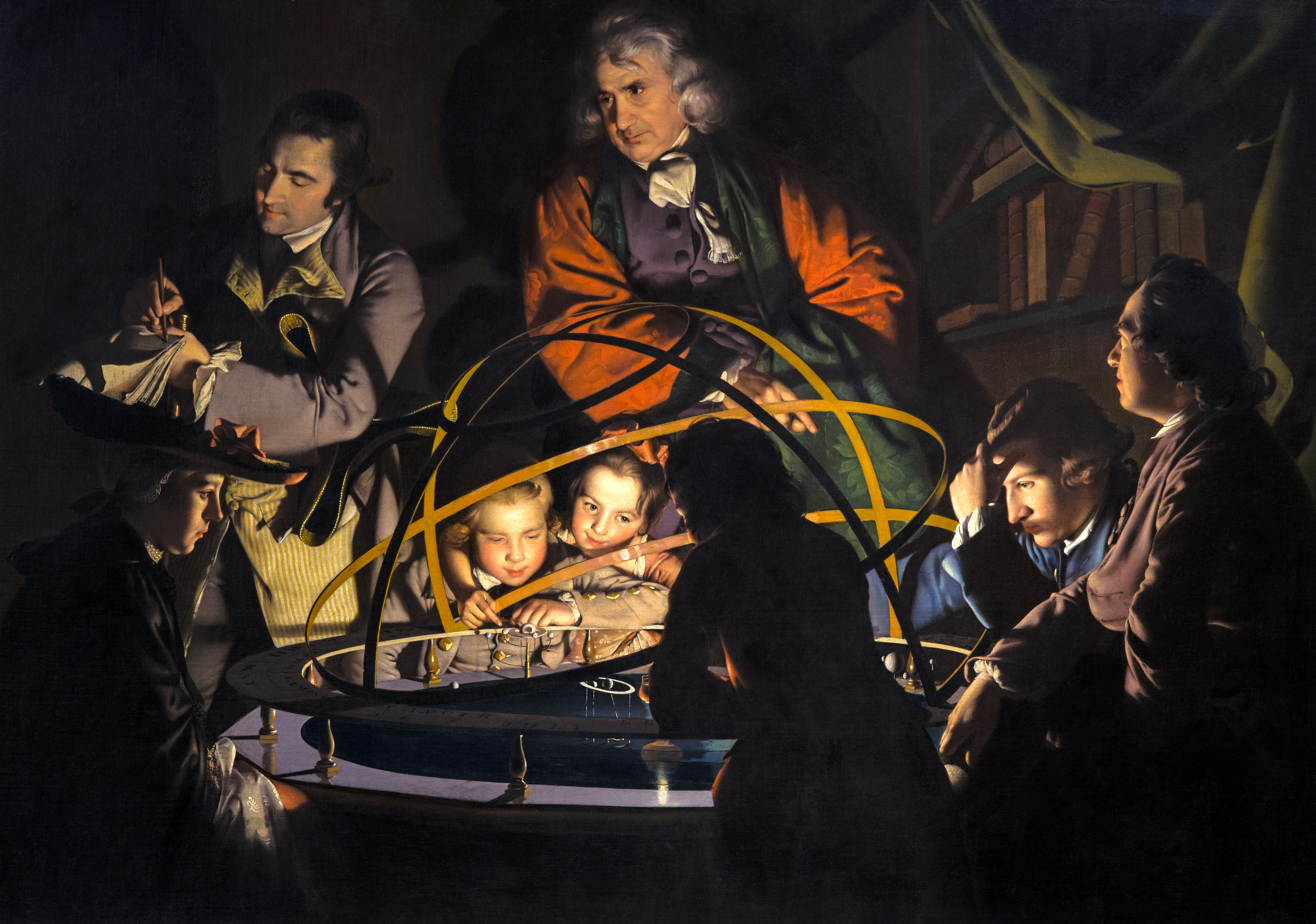
circa 1766

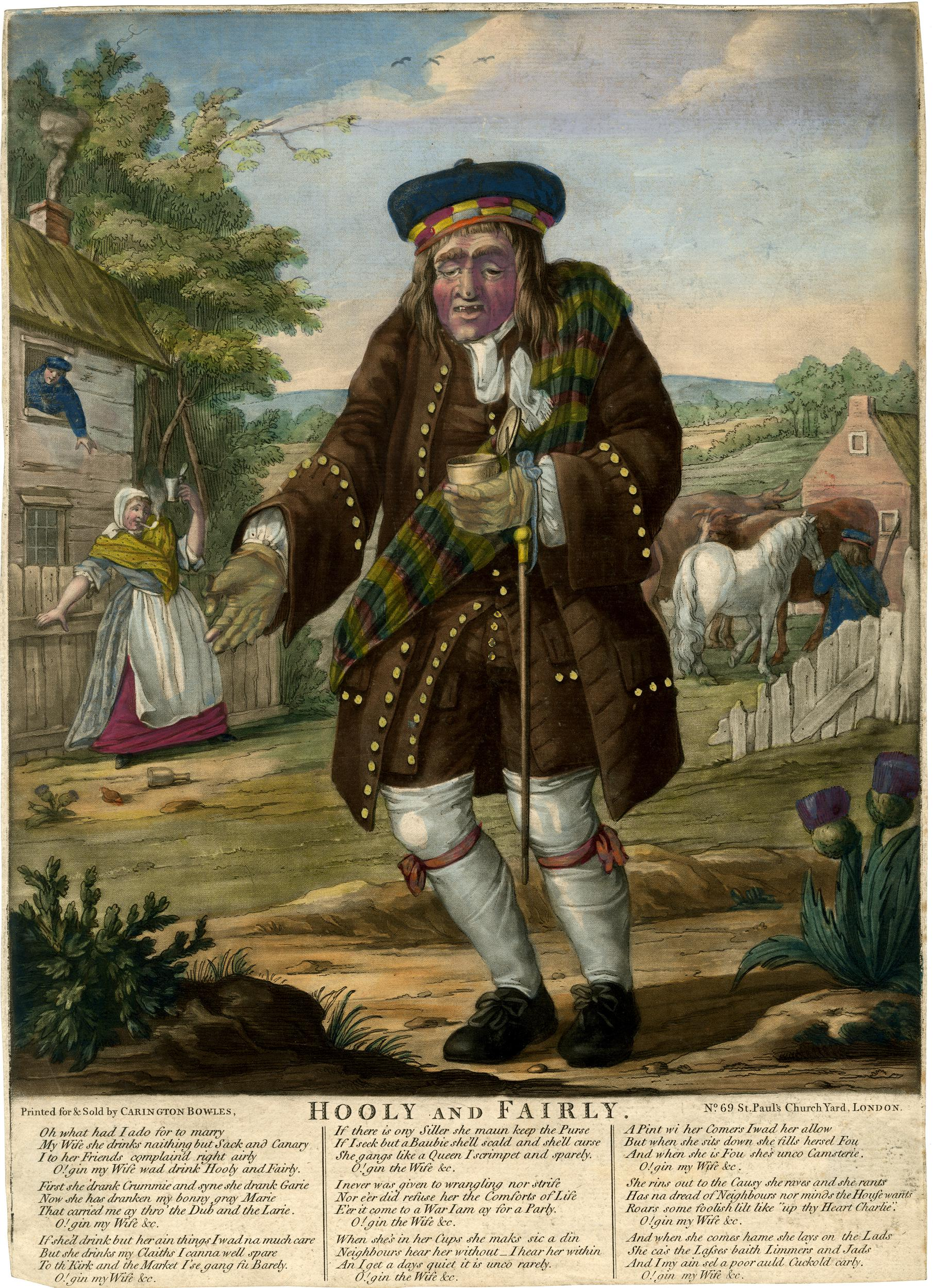
Steinkirk cravat worn as part of rural conservative costume almost 100 years after its introduction, circa 1787

The maccaronis reintroduced the flowing cravat in the 1770s, and the manner of a man's knotting became indicative of his taste and style, to the extent that after the Battle of Waterloo (1815) the cravat began to be referred to as a "tie".

== Gallery ==
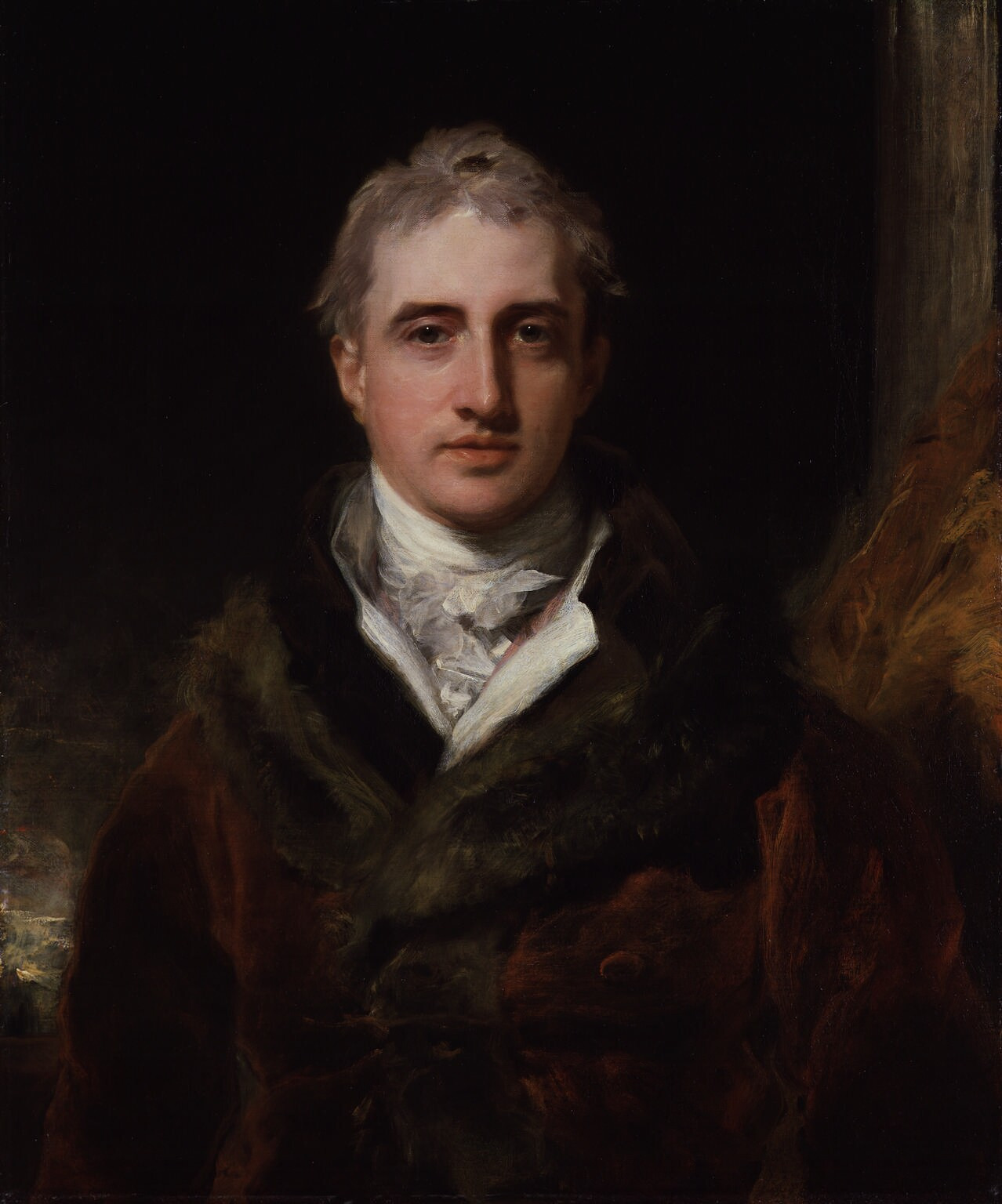
Robert Stewart, Viscount Castlereagh, wearing a cravat

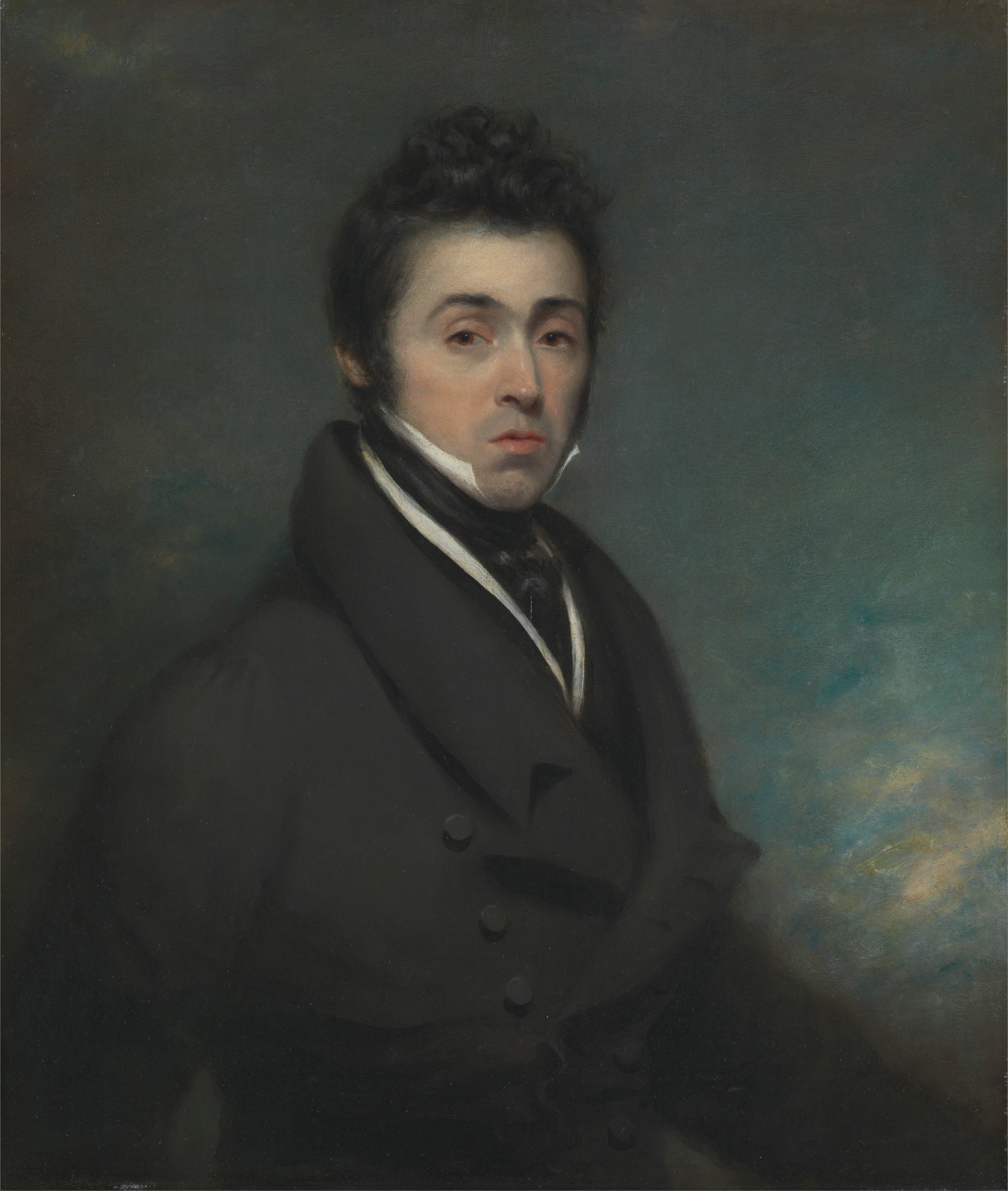
An unknown man wearing a cravat in the early 19th century

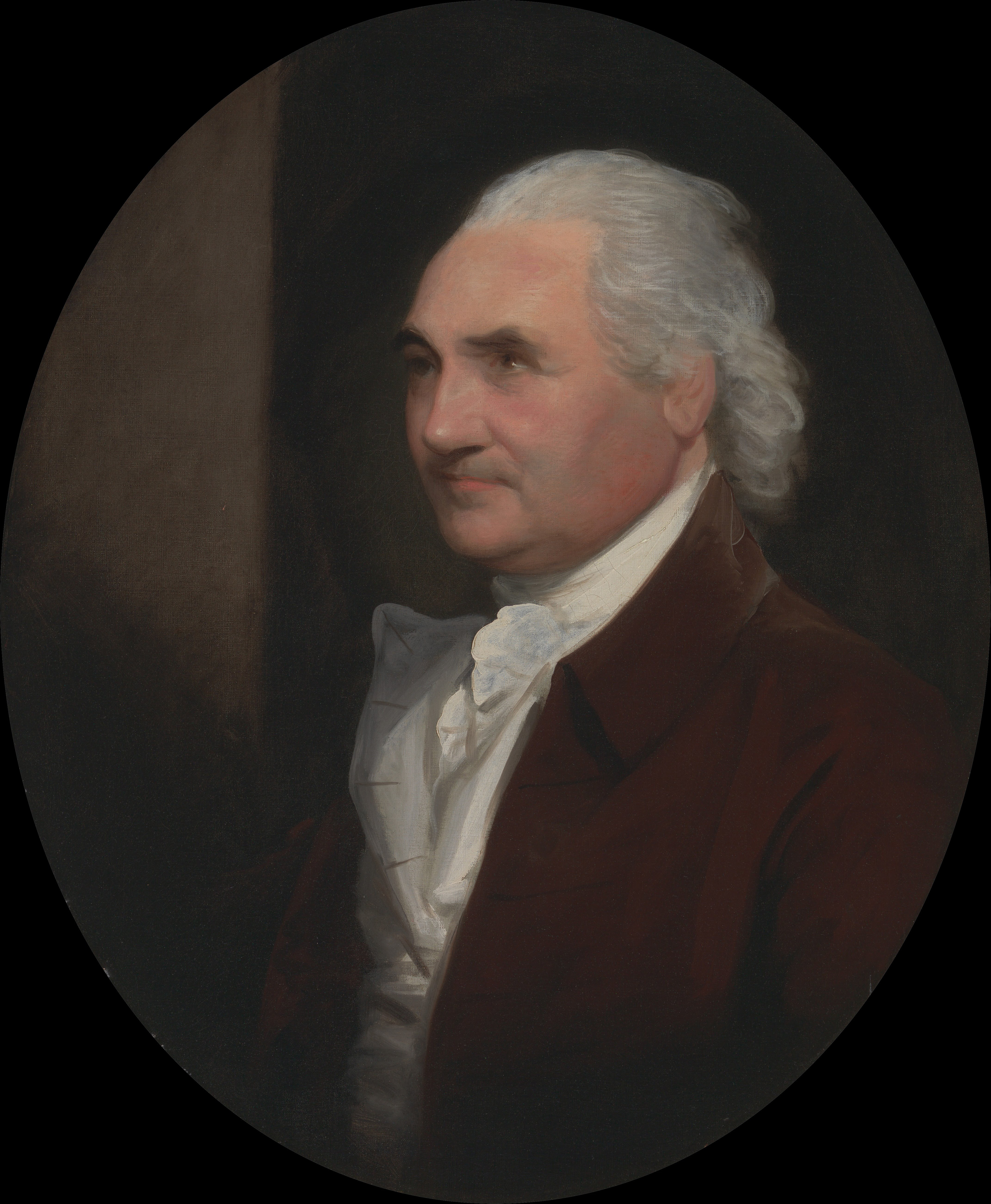
Colonel Isaac Barre wearing a cravat in the mid-18th century

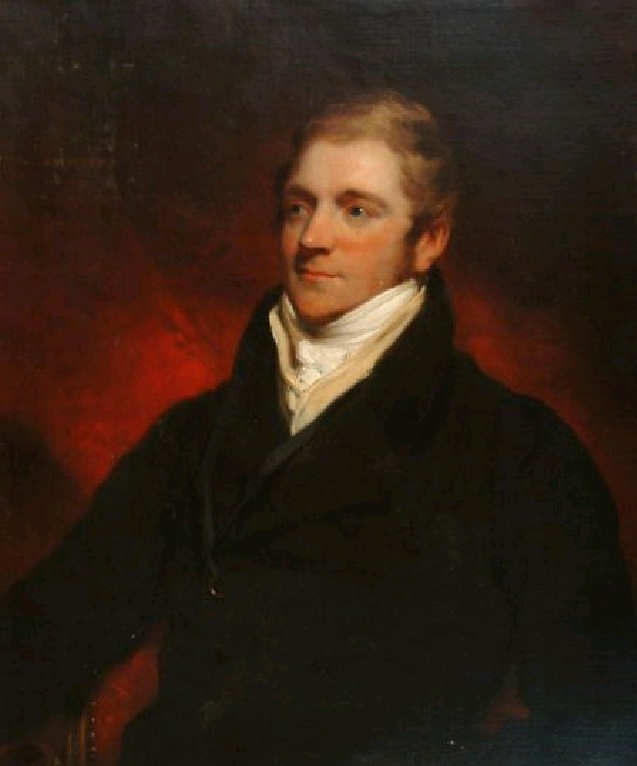
Thomas Tooke wearing a cravat in the late 18th century

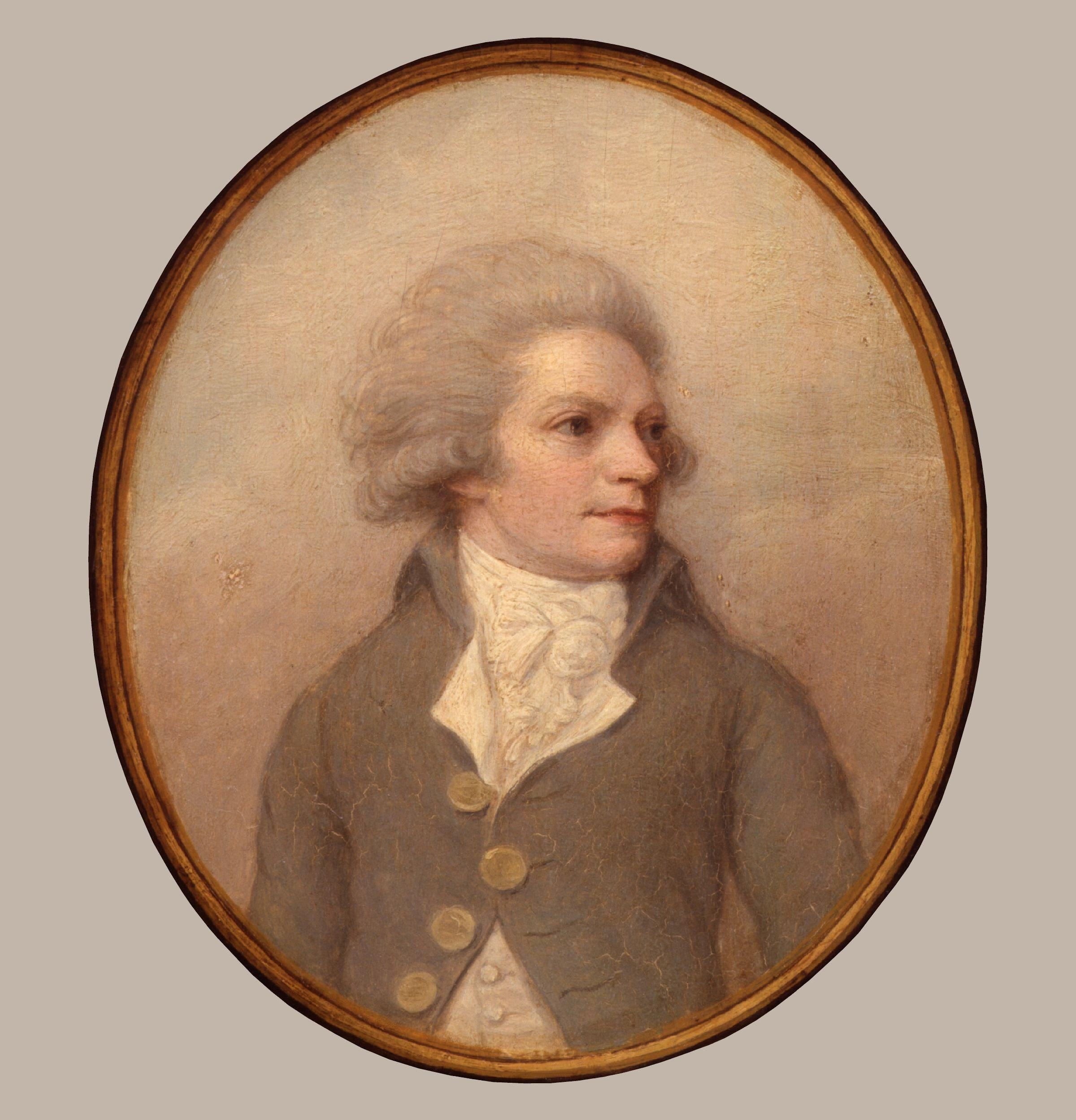
Richard Cosway, the Macaroni Artist

== See also ==
- Cravat Regiment
- Pussy bow

== Sources ==
- Frucht, Richard C. (2004). Eastern Europe: An introduction to the people, lands, and culture. Vol. 2. ABC-CLIO. ISBN 978-1-57607-800-6.
