= Cravat Regiment =

Guard of honour based in Zagreb, Croatia

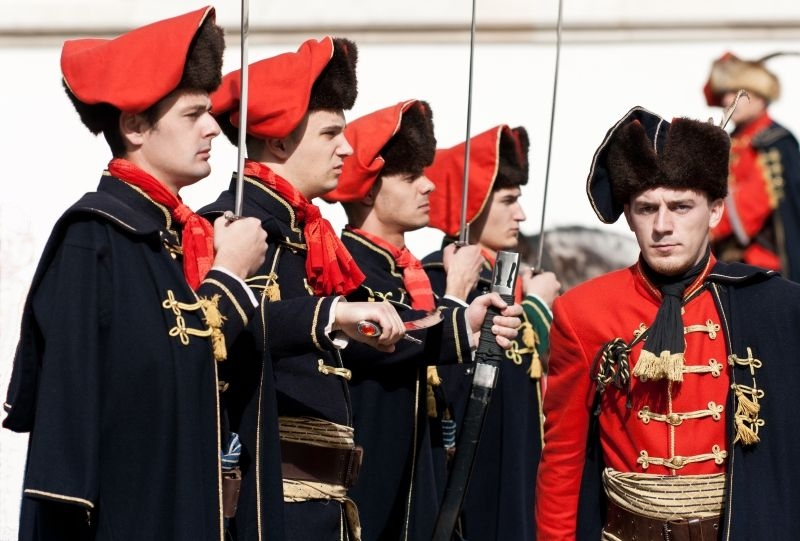
The Cravat Regiment at St Mark's Square

The Cravat Regiment (Croatian: Kravat pukovnija) is a guard of honour based in Zagreb, Croatia. Beginning in 2010, the regiment has regularly performed a march in the Upper Town of Zagreb which culminates in a changing of the guard at St Mark's Square. The regiment wears uniforms that are replicas of those worn by the military forces called the Croats which fought during the Thirty Years' War.

== Schedule ==
The changing of the guard is performed every Saturday and Sunday at noon, from April to October. Aside from weekends, the changing of the guard also takes place on special occasions such as Zagreb City Day (31 May), Cravat Day (18 October) and New Year's Day (1 January).

== See also ==
- Cravat
