= Gravit =

Free and open-source gravity simulator

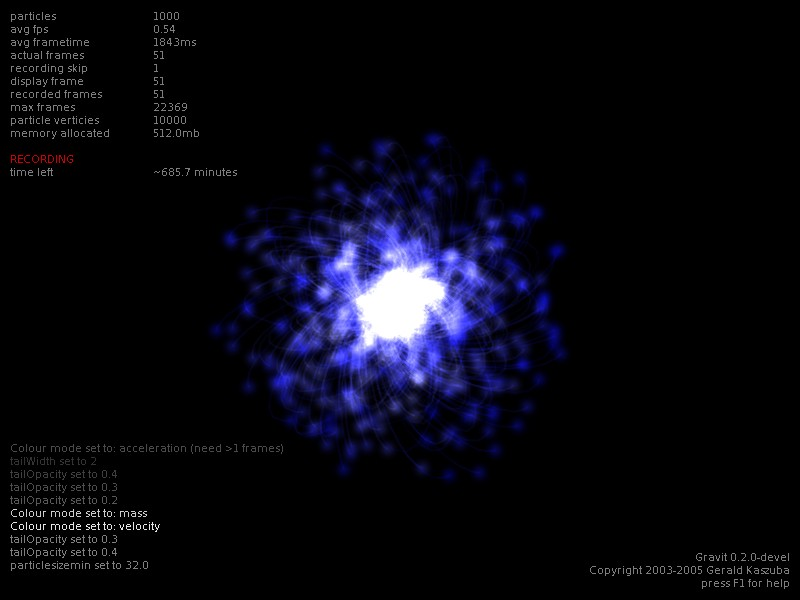
- Gravit screenshot
- Developer(s): Gerald Kaszuba
- Initial release: 2005; 20 years ago
- Stable release: 0.5.1 / 5 March 2014; 11 years ago
- Repository: github.com/gak/gravit
- Written in: C
- Operating system: Cross-platform
- Available in: English
- Type: Educational software
- License: GPL
- Website: gravit.slowchop.com

Gravit is a free and open-source gravity simulator distributed under the GNU General Public License. The program is available for all major operating systems, including Linux and other Unix-like systems, Microsoft Windows and Mac OS X.

Gravit uses the Barnes–Hut algorithm to simulate the n-body problem.

== Description ==
Gravit is a gravity simulator which runs under Linux, Windows and Mac OS X. It is released under the GNU General Public License which makes it free. It uses Newtonian physics using the Barnes-Hut N-body algorithm. Although the main goal of Gravit is to be as accurate as possible, it also creates beautiful looking gravity patterns. It records the history of each particle so it can animate and display a path of its travels. At any stage you can rotate your view in 3D and zoom in and out. Gravit uses OpenGL with Lua, SDL, SDL_ttf and SDL_image.

Features

- View the simulation in 3D, optionally using stereoscopic imaging
- Can be installed as a screen saver in Windows
- Record a simulation, then play back at any speed
- Load / Save a recorded simulation
- Mouse controllable rotation
- Console with script execution
- See an octtree being created in real-time
- Colours can be based on mass, velocity, acceleration, momentum or kinetic energy
- Initial particle locations are scriptable (Lua)

== Status ==
As of some time in 2017, the website is dead, though the GitHub repository remains alive.

== See also ==
- Galaxy- A similar open source stellar simulator
- Gravitation
- Newtonian mechanics
