= Croats (military unit) =

- Active: 17th century
- Country: Habsburg monarchy
- Allegiance: (Holy Roman Empire) Imperial Army
- Branch: light cavalry
- Type: auxiliary
- Role: off-battlefield
- Equipment: Carbine and pistols
- Engagements: Thirty Years' War; Stadtlohn; Magdeburg; Breitenfeld; Lützen; Nördlingen

Commanders
- Initial structures: Count of Tilly
- First regular regiments: Albrecht von Wallenstein

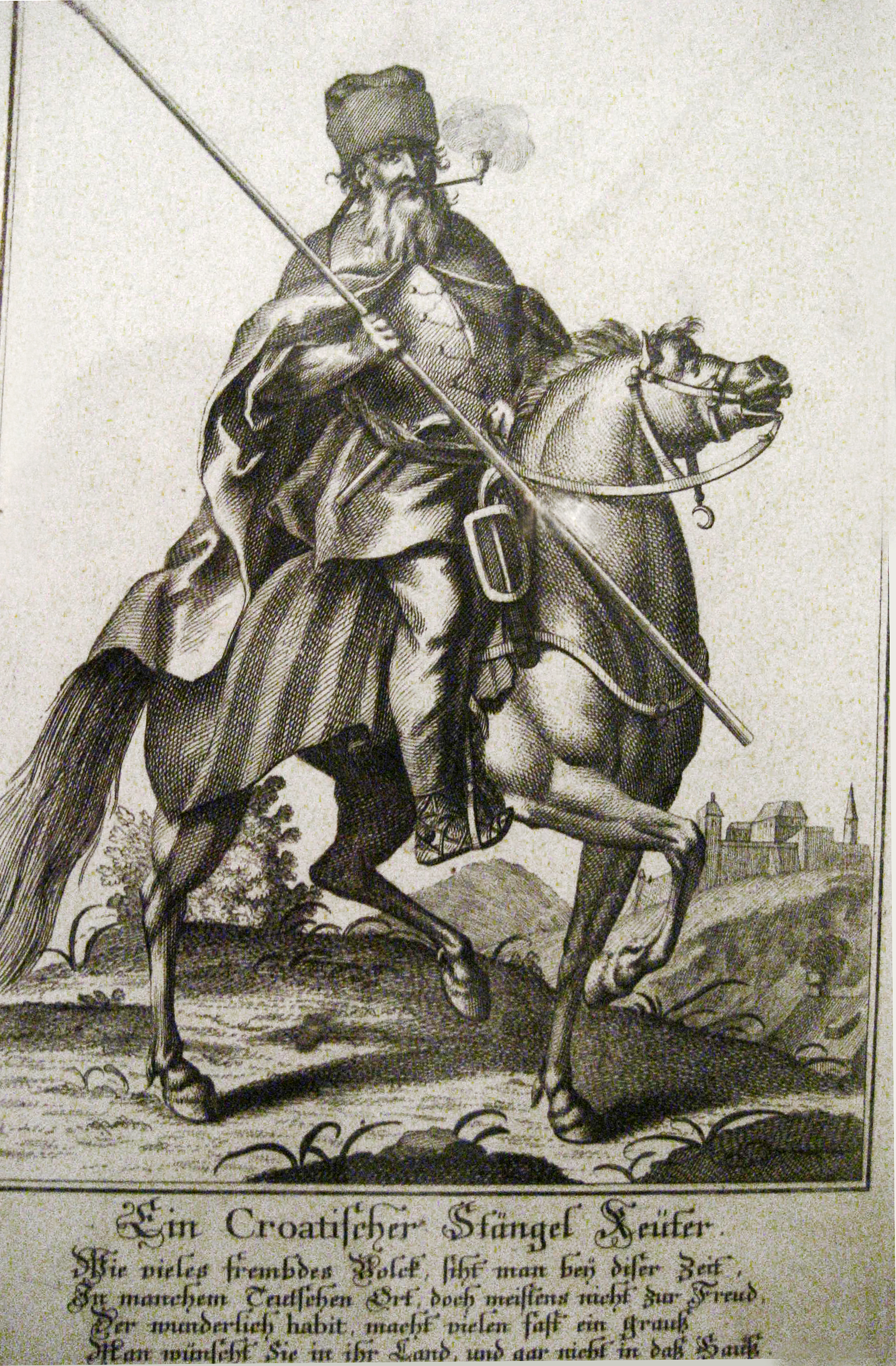
17th-century depiction of a Croatian cavalryman (Ein Croatischer Stängel Reüter)

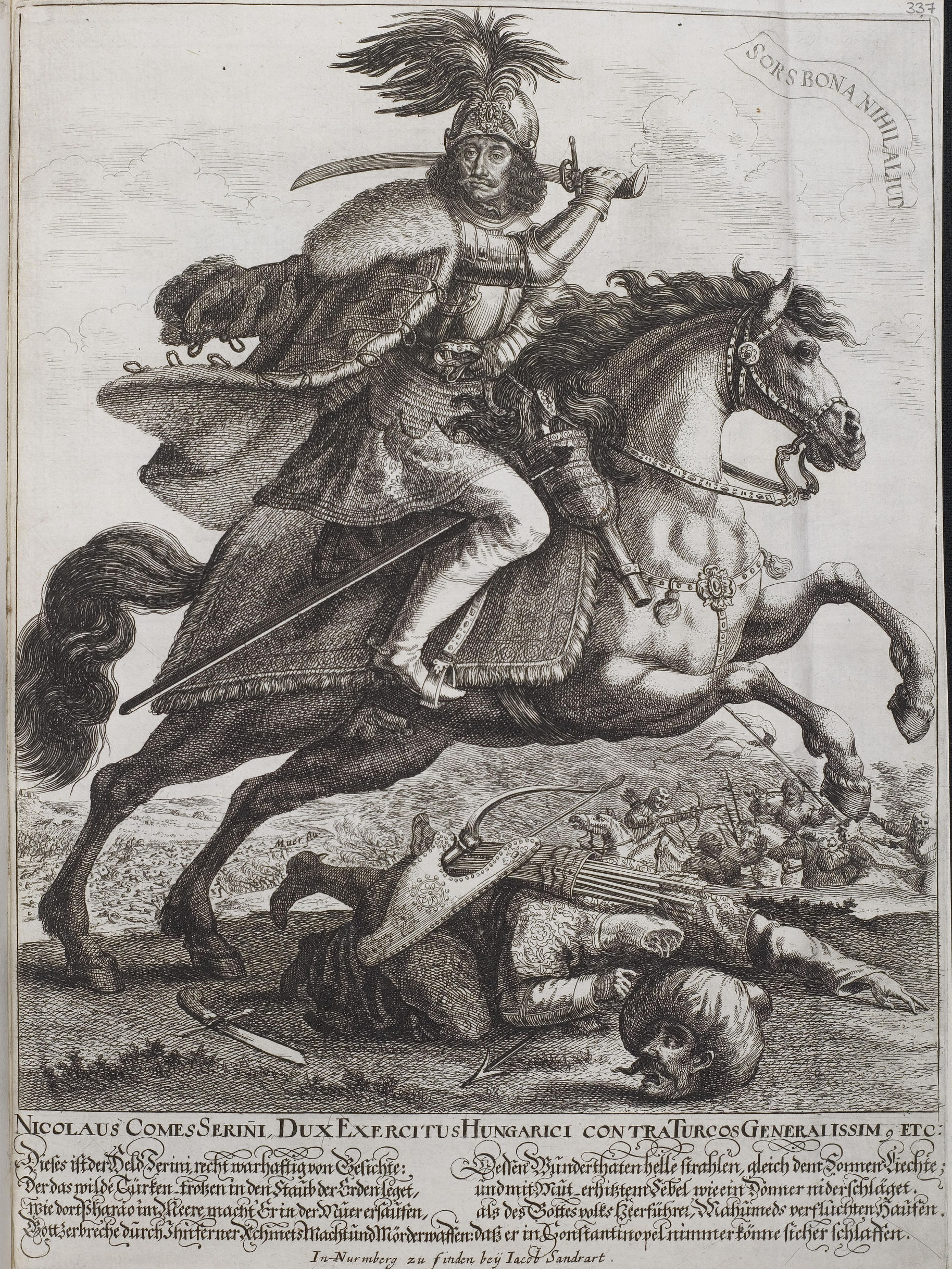
Nikola Zrinski in a battle against the Ottomans

The Croats, also known as Cravats or Crabats, were 17th-century light cavalry forces in Central Europe, comparable to the hussars. The Croats were initially irregular units loosely organized in bands. The first regular Croat regiment was established in 1625.

The most notable engagement of the Croats was their participation on the Habsburg side in the Thirty Years' War, serving in the Imperial Army or within the troops of the Catholic League. At the height of the Thirty Years' War, as many as 20,000 Croatian cavalry were in the service of the Imperial Army, including the majority of Wallenstein's harquebusiers.

The name came to be used as a generic term for light cavalry from the area of the Habsburg Military Frontier rather than an ethnic designation, and included ethnic Croats, Hungarians, Serbs, Wallachians, Poles, Cossacks, Albanians and Tatars.

== Initial structure ==
The Croats were initially recruited by generals of the Habsburg monarchy. The soldiers who joined Croats signed contracts which expired after the military campaign would be over, most often for any booty and sometimes for a fee. At the beginning, their bands were loosely organized. They were dismissed after the military campaign was finished and returned in the spring to be recruited by their old commanders.

In 1623, the size of the Croat units under command of Count of Tilly was reduced from 172 hearths to 72. They participated in the 1623 Battle of Stadtlohn under Tilly's command. Denmark hired in Croat troops during both the Swedish Wars (1657-1660) and the Scanian War (1676-79).

== Establishment of the regular units ==
The first regular Croat regiment was established in 1625 by Johann Ludwig Hektor von Isolani, a military officer in service of Albrecht von Wallenstein. They were engaged to confuse the enemy flanks by attacking their wings. In many historical works the Croats are criticized for their cruel methods. It has been reported that the worst atrocities during the Sack of Magdeburg were committed by the Croats and Walloons. By the end of 1633, the Croats began their service in the army of the Kingdom of France.

== Equipment and uniform ==
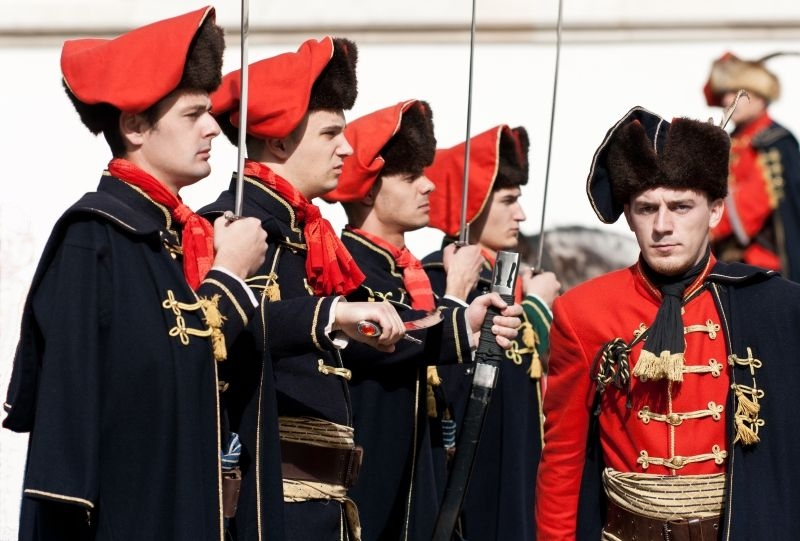
The Cravat Regiment in Zagreb (2012 photograph)

The Croats wore hats made of fur and long red cloaks. Their primary arms were carbines. Besides the carbine the Croat arms included two pistols. The Croats wore scarves around their necks, probably for hygienic purposes. During the Thirty Years' War the Croats came in contact with French who were impressed by their outfit and soon adopted the scarf, naming it after the Croats, cravat (French: cravate), which evolved into the modern-day cravat and necktie. The Cravat Regiment is a guard of honour established in 2010 in Zagreb, Croatia, which wears uniforms that are replicas of those worn by the Croats.

== Legacy ==
The influence of the Croat military unit was so strong that between 1631 and 1638 similar units were established in Bavaria, Spain and France. At the beginning of the 20th century mothers still scared their children with tales about the 1631 Sack of Magdeburg in which Croats took part. The population of eastern France compared all invasions after the Thirty Years' War with stories about Croats and Swedes who ravaged their territory in the 1630s. The Croats are mentioned in Grimmelshausen's Simplicissimus and in Friedrich Schiller's Wallenstein.

== General and cited references ==
- Van Antwerp Fine, John Jr. (1 January 2006). When Ethnicity Did Not Matter in the Balkans: A Study of Identity in Pre-Nationalist Croatia, Dalmatia, and Slavonia in the Medieval and Early-Modern Periods. University of Michigan Press. ISBN 0-472-02560-0.
- Brnardic, Vladimir (2010). Imperial Armies of the Thirty Years' War (2): Cavalry. Osprey Publishing. ISBN 978-1-84603-997-3.
- Schiller, Friedrich (1861). Complete works. Ed. with careful rev. and new tr., by C.J. Hempel.
- Lederer, David (2012). "Fear of the Thirty Years War". In Laffan, Michael; Weiss, Max (eds.). Facing Fear: The History of an Emotion in Global Perspective. Princeton University Press. pp. 10–30. ISBN 978-0-691-15360-5.
- Kortüm, Hans-Henning (1 January 2006). Transcultural Wars: from the Middle Ages to the 21st Century. Walter de Gruyter. ISBN 978-3-05-004995-3.
- Lunde, Henrik O. (10 September 2014). A Warrior Dynasty: The Rise and Decline of Sweden as a Military Superpower. Casemate. ISBN 978-1-61200-243-9.
- Wilson, Peter Hamish (2009). The Thirty Years War: Europe's Tragedy. Harvard University Press. ISBN 978-0-674-03634-5. Archived from the original on 2020-07-09.
- Brzezinski, Richard (2001). Lützen 1632: Climax of the Thirty Years War. Osprey Publishing. ISBN 978-1-85532-552-4. Archived from the original on 2021-10-28.
- Morris, John E. (4 July 2013). A History of Modern Europe: From the Middle of the Sixteenth Century. Cambridge University Press. ISBN 978-1-107-62077-3.
- Brady, Thomas A. Jr. (13 July 2009). German Histories in the Age of Reformations, 1400–1650. Cambridge University Press. ISBN 978-1-139-48115-1.
- Guthrie, William P. (2002). Battles of the Thirty Years War: From White Mountain to Nordlingen, 1618–1635. Greenwood Press. ISBN 978-0-313-32028-6.
- Weir, William (1 October 2006). Fatal Victories. Pegasus Books. ISBN 978-1-933648-12-5.
- Urban, William (1 July 2007). Bayonets For Hire: The U.S. Artillery from the Civil War to the Spanish–American War, 1861–1898. Frontline Books. ISBN 978-1-85367-742-7.
- Frucht, Richard C. (2004). Eastern Europe: an introduction to the people, lands, and culture. Vol. 2. ABC-CLIO. ISBN 978-1-57607-800-6. Archived from the original on 2020-07-29.
- Stanić, Damir (20 September 2022). A Conversation with Michael Weise about Croatian Soldiers during the Thirty Years' War. historiografija.hr. ISSN 1848-1728.
