= Automobile graveyard =

Place where abandoned or discarded vehicles are present

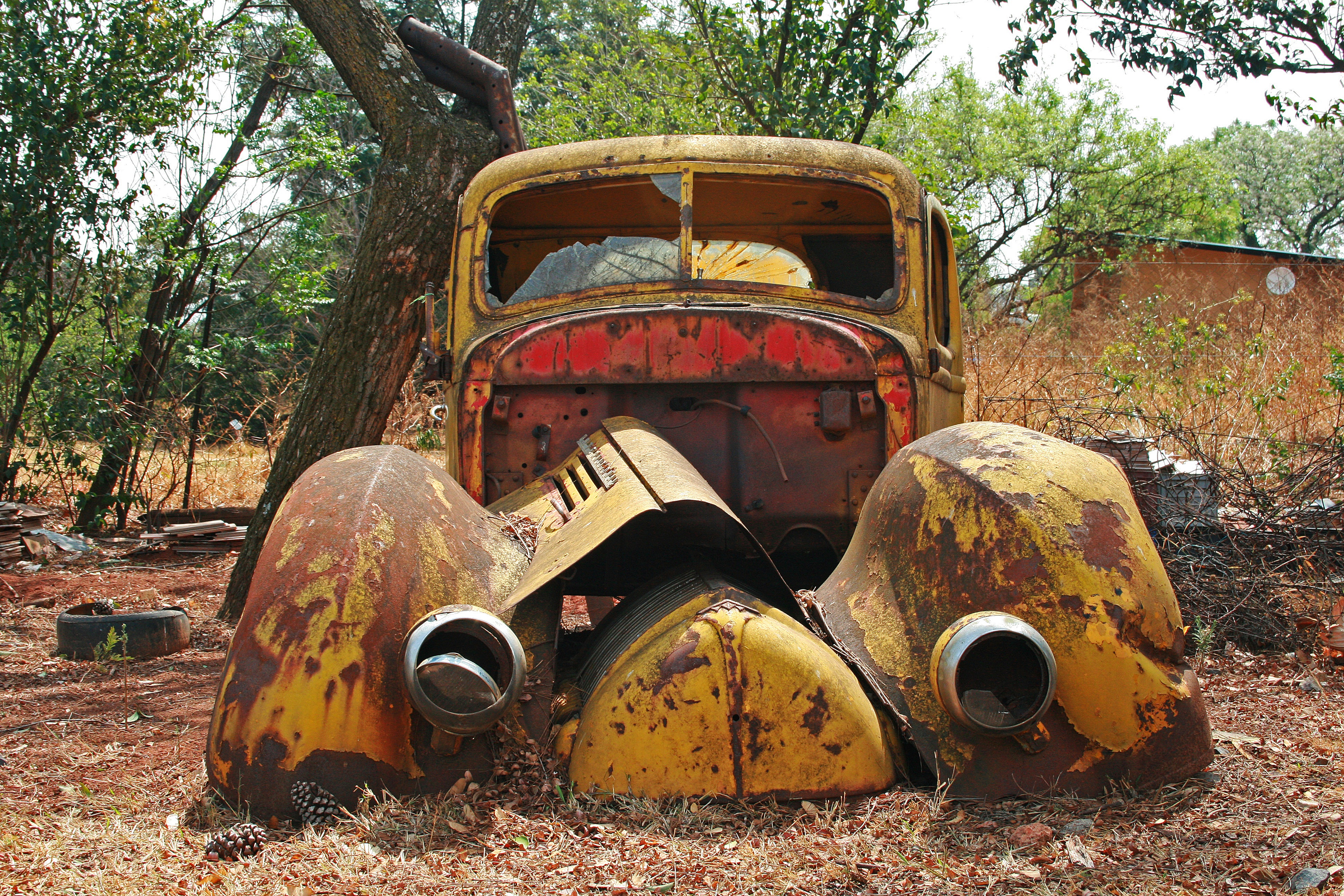
An abandoned vintage automobile

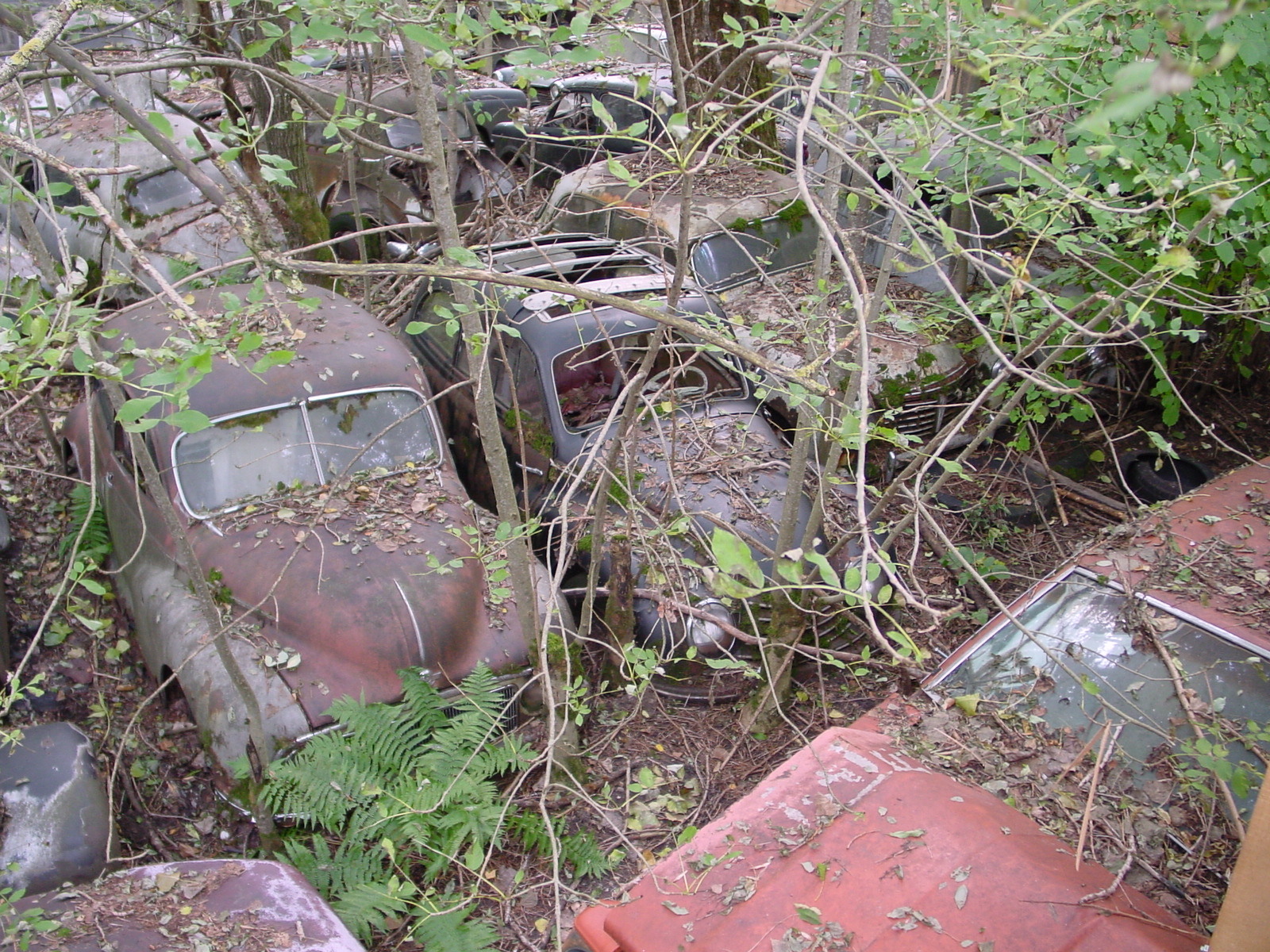
A car graveyard in Kaufdorf, September 2008, before it was cleared

An automobile graveyard or car cemetery is a place in which decrepit road vehicles reside while waiting to be destroyed or recycled or are left abandoned and decaying.

== Locations and purposes ==
There are numerous automobile graveyards that can be found around the world. The purpose of each location varies. Just outside Victorville, California there are hundreds of thousands of cars that were bought back by Volkswagen after the 2015 emissions scandal and they are awaiting recycling or destruction. Some cemeteries operate in a manner similar to scrapyards where rare spare parts can be found. The Historischer Autofriedhof Gürbetal in Kaufdorf comprised hundreds of cars, mostly from the 1930s to 1960s. The cars went untouched for more than 30 years. They were collected with the hope of salvaging useful and rare parts. However, time and nature led to the vehicles' decay. Overgrown with rare flora and fauna, the site had to be cleared when environmental concerns were raised in 2009.

Sites containing such cemeteries can become public attractions. In the U.S. state of Georgia, Wade Alonso's Auto Parts & Wrecker Service is colloquially known as "The School Bus Graveyard". Looking for a way to reduce theft from his property, Alonso built a large wall using school buses and RVs. Many of the state's artists came to paint the sides of the buses, creating a colourful and unusual art gallery around which people are freely welcome to wander. Also in Georgia is Old Car City USA, world's largest car junkyard, a site which began in 1931 as a car dealership but now serves as a 6-mile trail for visitors to discover over 4,000 cars. While many automobile graveyards are easily accessible, others are much less welcoming. The automobile graveyard in the Karhunkorpi area in Nurmijärvi, Finland is a notorious and nature-overtaken collection of abandoned vehicles located in a private area, hidden deep in the forest around an abandoned house, dozens or even hundreds of scrap cars have been lying around for decades, while the area has long been in the teeth of environmental authorities. In 2016 urban explorers found a "mountain of vehicles" in an abandoned Welsh mine. The cars were piled up at the bottom of the slate mine and are believed to have been there since the 1970s. Such sites can also be popular amongst photographers.

Some automobile cemeteries do not contain civilian vehicles such as cars and motorbikes, but specialized vehicles instead. French authorities set up a warehouse to help preserve firefighting history, storing fire engines that date back to the early 20th century. The vehicles, though covered in dust, were protected from the elements, but after an urban explorer published photographs of the site they were all moved to a new, secret location. There are also sites with numerous armoured vehicles, sometimes referred to as tank graveyard. Another notable specialized vehicle graveyard is the race car graveyard located in North Carolina owned by NASCAR driver Dale Earnhardt Jr., which became the final resting place for cars such as Juan Pablo Montoya's 2012 Daytona 500 car that collided with a jet dryer during the race.

== See also ==
- Châtillon, Belgium, location of a car cemetery
- Car crusher
  - Automotive shredder residue
- Vehicle recycling
