= Mutilated Coin Redemption Program =

The Mutilated Coin Redemption Program was a program of the United States Mint that allowed holders of damaged United States coins to exchange them for usable money.

Clients could redeem large quantities (tons) of coins that are recovered from scrapping, vehicle recycling, and car shredding operations overseas.

The large volume and a growth of that volume suggested possible vulnerabilities in the program. Counterfeit mutilated coins could be redeemed for real money. A high percentage of undamaged coins suggested the possibility that the program could be misused for money laundering. Silver coins were absent (as required), and the percentages of pennies and nickels was low (suggesting local melting rather than redemption).

The Mint shut the program down for two years before resumption was announced on January 23, 2018. In September 2024 the Mint announced the end of the Mutilated Coin Redemption Program.
