= Scrap =

Recyclable materials left over from manufactured products after their use

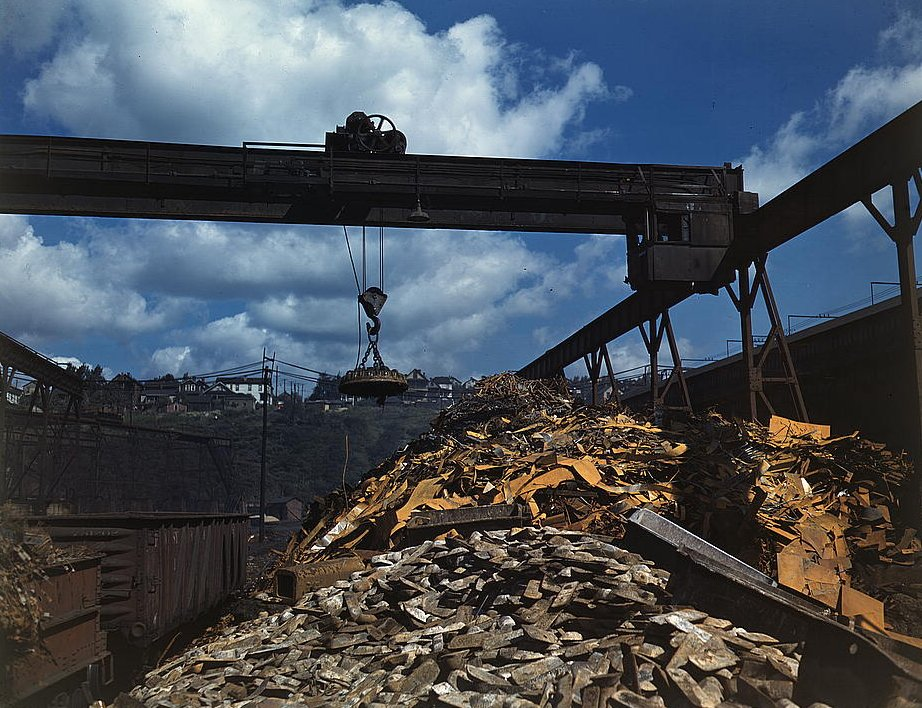
Piles of scrap metal collected for the World War II effort, c. 1941

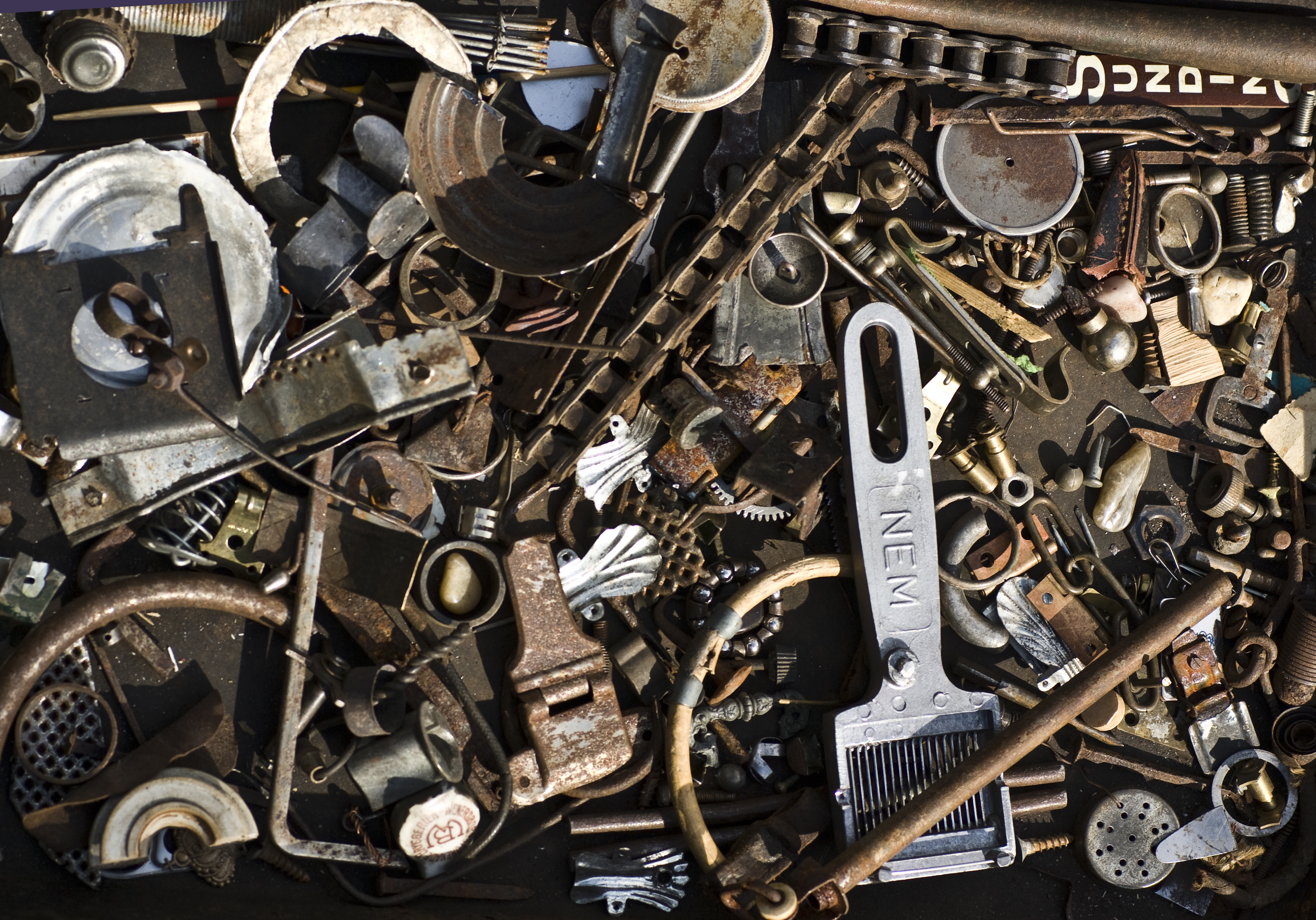
Collection of leftover scrap metal items

Scrap consists of recyclable materials, usually metals, left over from product manufacturing and consumption, such as parts of vehicles, building supplies, and surplus materials. Unlike waste, scrap can have monetary value, especially recovered metals, and non-metallic materials are also recovered for recycling. Once collected, the materials are sorted into types – typically metal scrap will be crushed, shredded, and sorted using mechanical processes.

Metal recycling, especially of structural steel, ships, used manufactured goods, such as vehicles and white goods, is an industrial activity with complex networks of wrecking yards, sorting facilities, and recycling plants. The industry includes both formal organizations and a wide range of informal roles such as waste pickers who help sorting through scrap.

== Processing ==
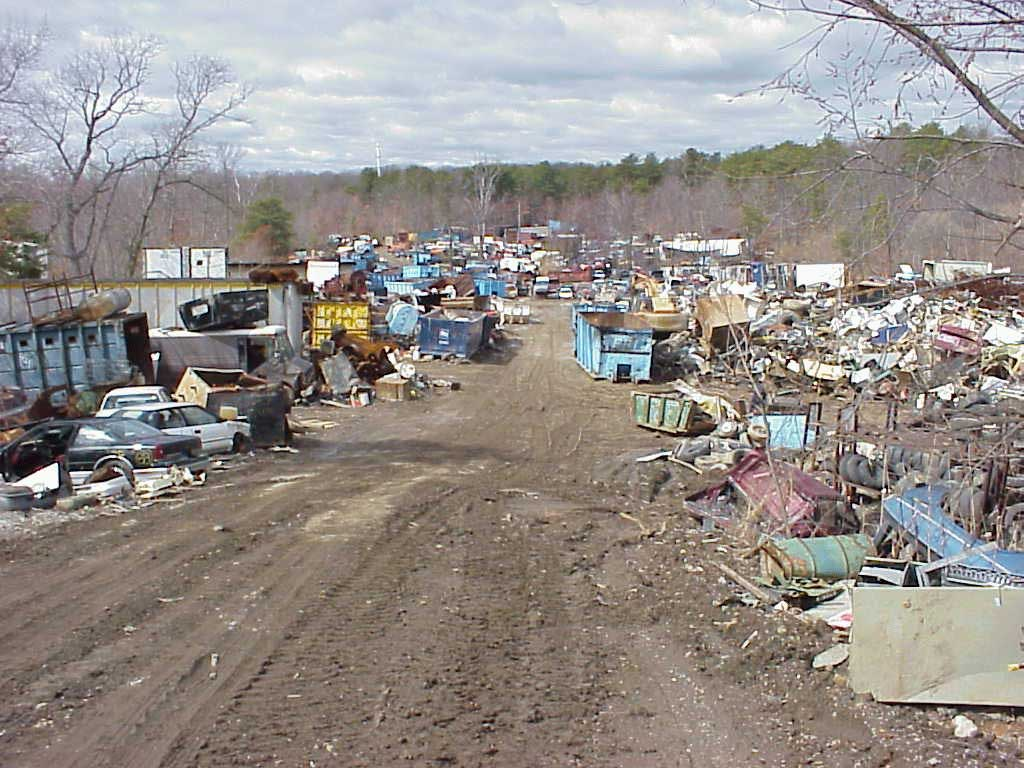
The "organized chaos" of a scrapyard

Scrap metal originates both in business and residential environments. Typically a "scrapper" will advertise their services to conveniently remove scrap metal for people who don't need it.

Scrap is often taken to a wrecking yard (also known as a scrapyard, junkyard, or breaker's yard), where it is processed for later melting into new products. A wrecking yard, depending on its location, may allow customers to browse their lot and purchase items before they are sent to the smelters, although many scrap yards that deal in large quantities of scrap usually do not, often selling entire units such as engines or machinery by weight with no regard to their functional status. Customers are typically required to supply all of their own tools and labor to extract parts, and some scrapyards may first require waiving liability for personal injury before entering. Many scrapyards also sell bulk metals (stainless steel, etc.) by weight, often at prices substantially below the retail purchasing costs of similar pieces.

A scrap metal shredder is often used to recycle items containing a variety of other materials in combination with steel. Examples are automobiles and white goods such as refrigerators, stoves, clothes washers, etc. These items are labor-intensive to manually sort things like plastic, copper, aluminum, and brass. By shredding it into relatively small pieces, the steel can easily be separated out magnetically. The non-ferrous waste stream requires other techniques to sort.

In contrast to wrecking yards, scrapyards typically sell everything by weight, instead of by item. To the scrapyard, the primary value of the scrap is what the smelter will give them for it, rather than the value of whatever shape the metal may be in. An auto wrecker, on the other hand, would price exactly the same scrap based on what the item does, regardless of what it weighs. Typically, if a wrecker cannot sell something above the value of the metal in it, they would then take it to the scrapyard and sell it by weight. Equipment containing parts of various metals can often be purchased at a price below that of either of the metals, due to saving the scrapyard the labor of separating the metals before shipping them to be recycled.

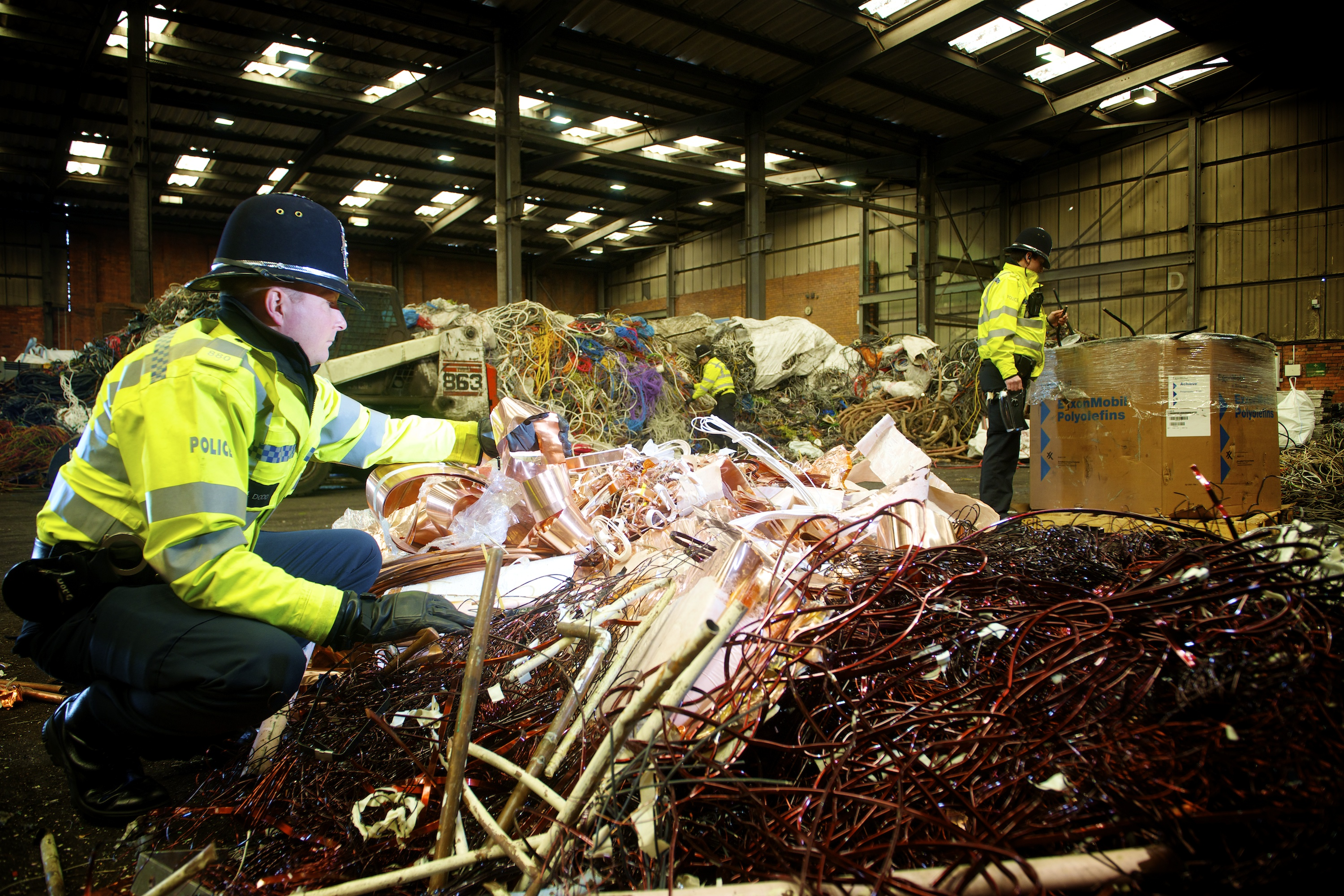
British police investigating possibly-stolen metal at a scrapyard

Thieves sometimes sell stolen items to scrapyards. Copper pipes and wiring, bronze monuments and aluminium siding have all been targets of metal theft, with the number of thefts increasing as prices rise. Manhole covers have also been stolen. In the 1970s, the term "newsjacking" was coined to describe the theft of newspapers for sale to scrap dealers.

The UK Scrap Metal Dealers Act 2013 further regulated the sale/purchase of scrap metal by obligating metal dealers ensure vendors provide proof of I-D for traceability purposes, usually though not exclusively vehicle driver's registration details. Payment in cash also ceased.

== Resources ==
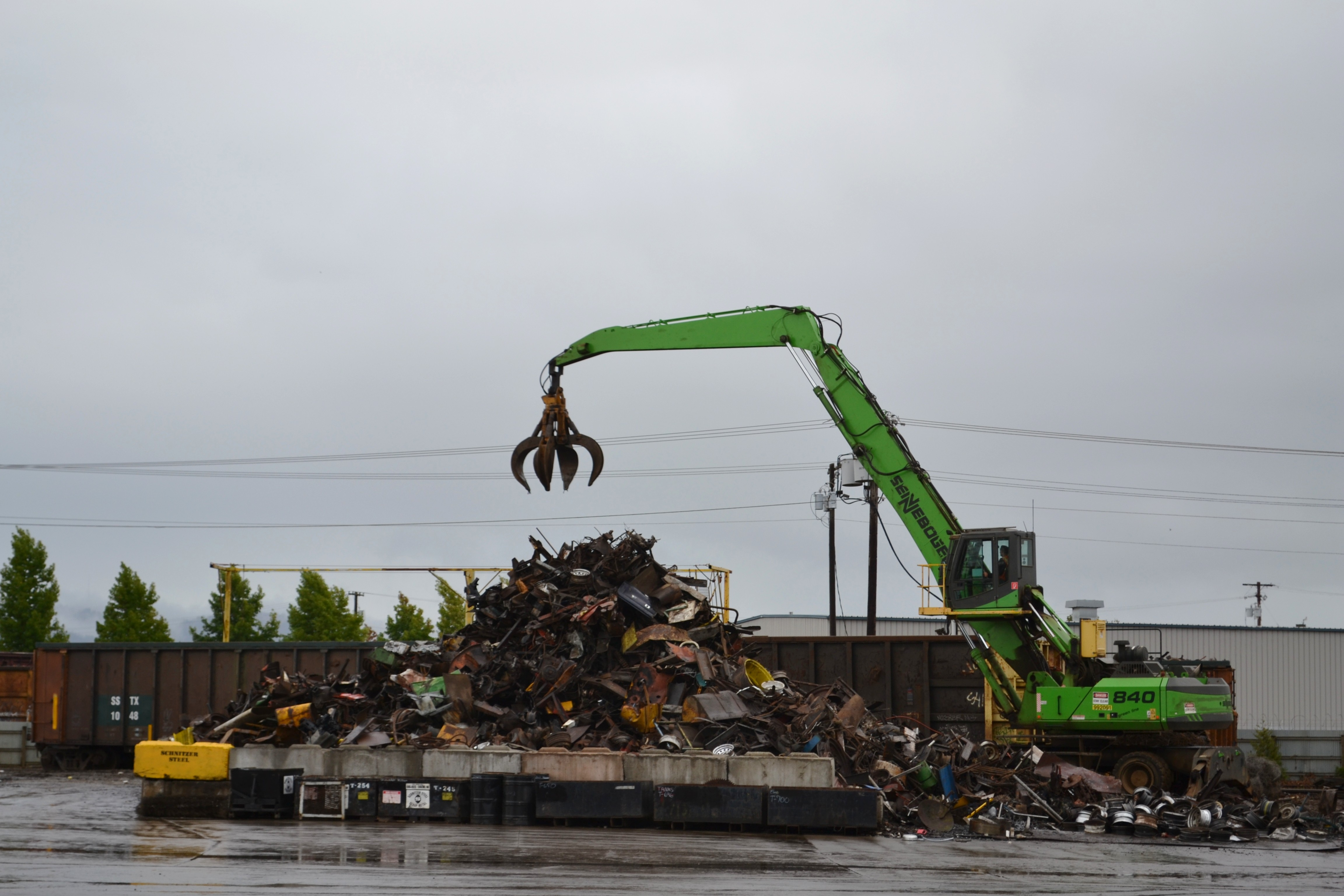
Loading scrap gondolas in Eugene, Oregon

Scrap prices may vary markedly over time and in different locations. Prices are often negotiated between buyers and sellers directly or indirectly over the Internet. Prices displayed as the market prices are not the prices that recyclers will see at the scrap yards. Other prices are ranges or older and not updated frequently. Some scrap websites have updated scrap prices.

In the US, scrap prices are reported in a handful of publications, including American Metal Market, based on confirmed sales as well as reference sites such as Scrap Metal Prices and Auctions. Non-US domiciled publications, such as The Steel Index, also report on the US scrap price, which has become increasingly important to global export markets. Scrap yards directories are also used by recyclers to find facilities in the US and Canada, allowing users to get in contact with yards.

With resources online for recyclers to look at for scrapping tips, like websites, blogs, and search engines, scrapping is often referred to as a hand and labor-intensive job. Taking apart and separating metals is important to making more money on scrap, tips like using a magnet to determine ferrous and non-ferrous materials can help recyclers make more money on their metal recycling. When a magnet sticks to the metal, it will be a ferrous material, like steel or iron. This is usually a less expensive item that is recycled but usually is recycled in larger quantities of thousands of pounds. Non-ferrous metals like copper, aluminum, and brass do not stick to a magnet. Some cheaper grades of stainless steel are magnetic, other grades are not. These items are higher priced commodities for metal recycling and are important to separate when recycling them. The prices of non-ferrous metals also tend to fluctuate more than ferrous metals so it is important for recyclers to pay attention to these sources and the overall markets.

== Urban mining ==
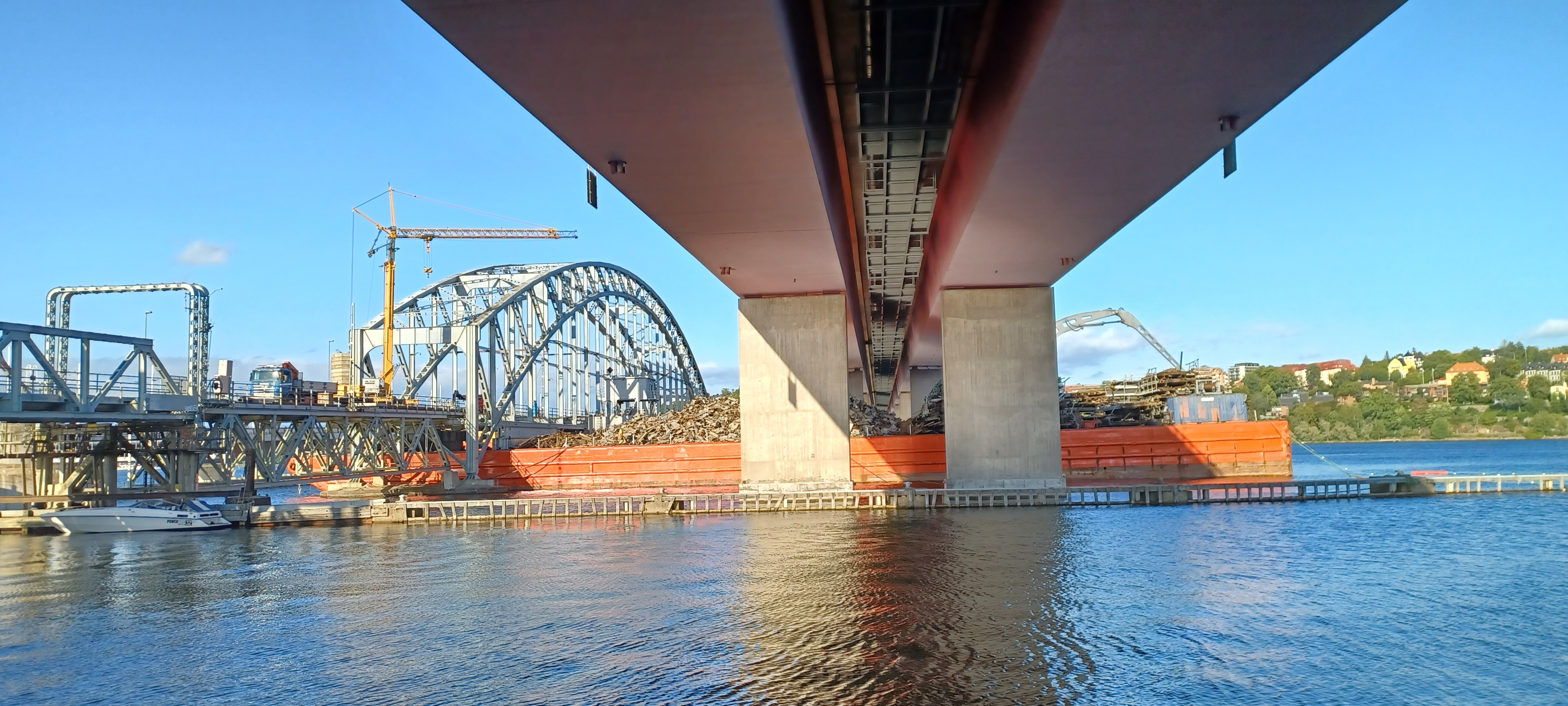
Collected scrap metal on barge in Stockholm in course of water transportation and recycling (2023)

This term is used to describe the recovery of "dormant" materials that once served a purpose in society but have become disused since. For example, large amounts of metal are buried underground as part of the provision of basic services including telecoms. Infrastructure, buildings and equipment stored or lying dormant in this way accounted for 28% of Sweden's copper use in 2021. In the same period, one sixth of the cables installed in Sweden's telecoms came from harvesting via urban mining. In particular this involved copper, aluminium, iron and steel. Figures for this are issued by SGU, a Swedish government body responsible for geological survey of bedrock, soil and groundwater.

== Hazards ==
Great potential exists in the scrap metal industry for accidents in which a hazardous material present in scrap causes death, injury, or environmental damage. A classic example is radioactivity in scrap; the Goiânia accident and the Mayapuri radiological accident were incidents involving radioactive materials. Toxic materials such as asbestos, and toxic metals such as beryllium, cadmium, lead and mercury may pose dangers to personnel, as well as contaminating materials intended for metal smelters.

Many specialized tools used in scrapyards are hazardous, such as the alligator shear, which cuts metal using hydraulic force, compactors, scrap metal shredder, and vacuum.

A Kawasaki Heavy Industries C151 train car being transported to the scrapyard for upcycling

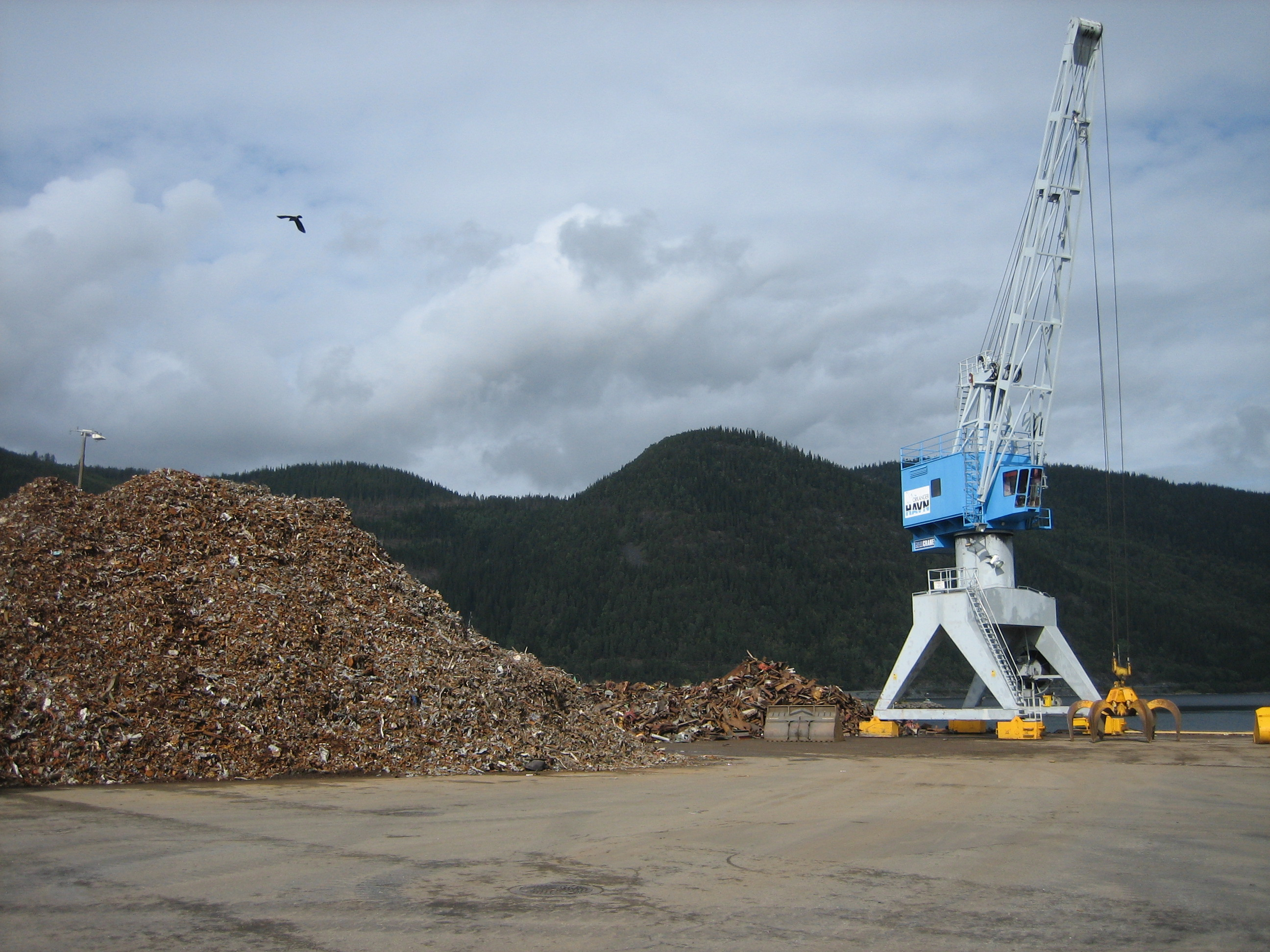
Pile of shredded scrap in Norway

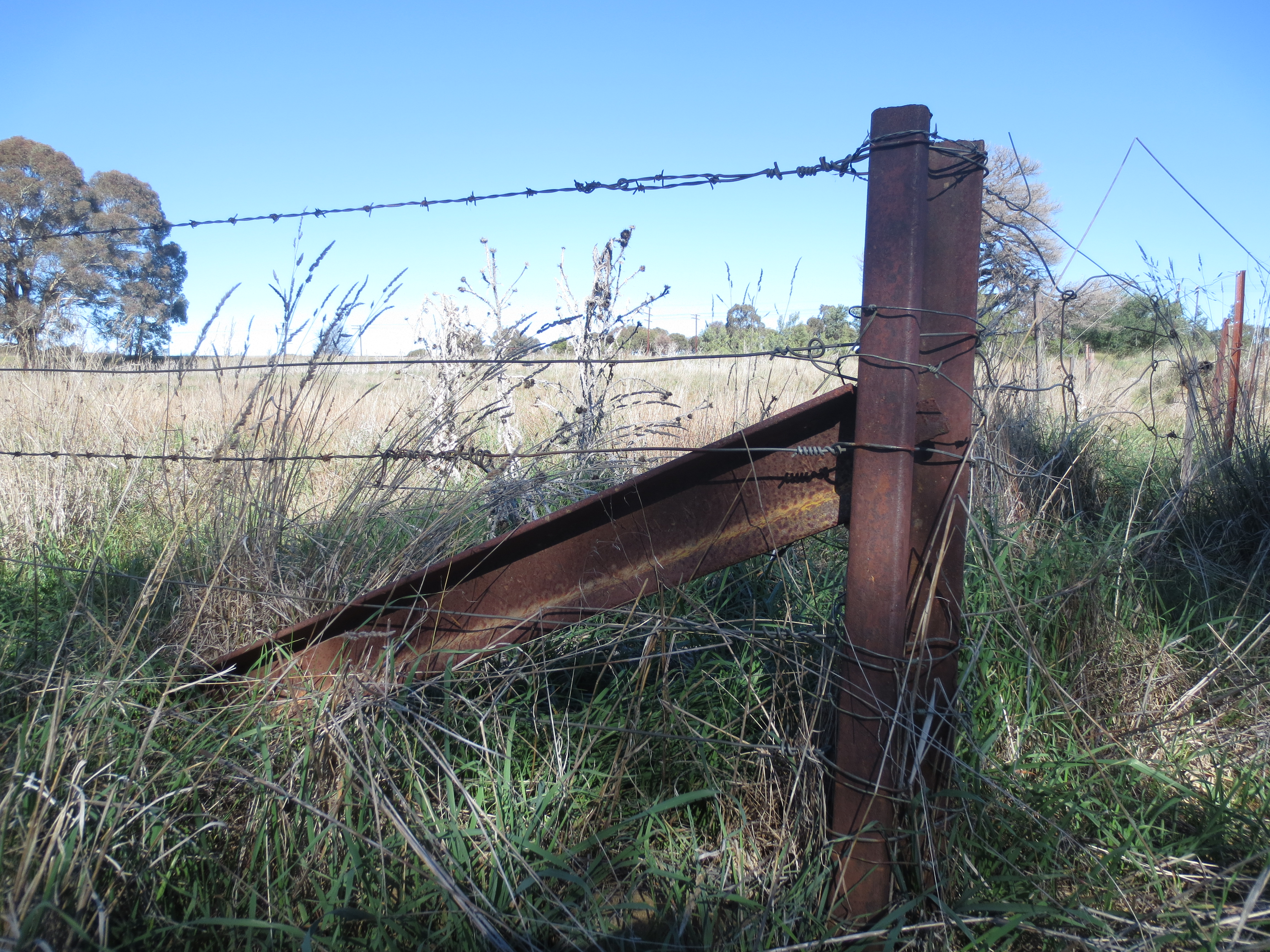
Scrap railway line repurposed as farm fencing corner post

== Metal recycling industry ==
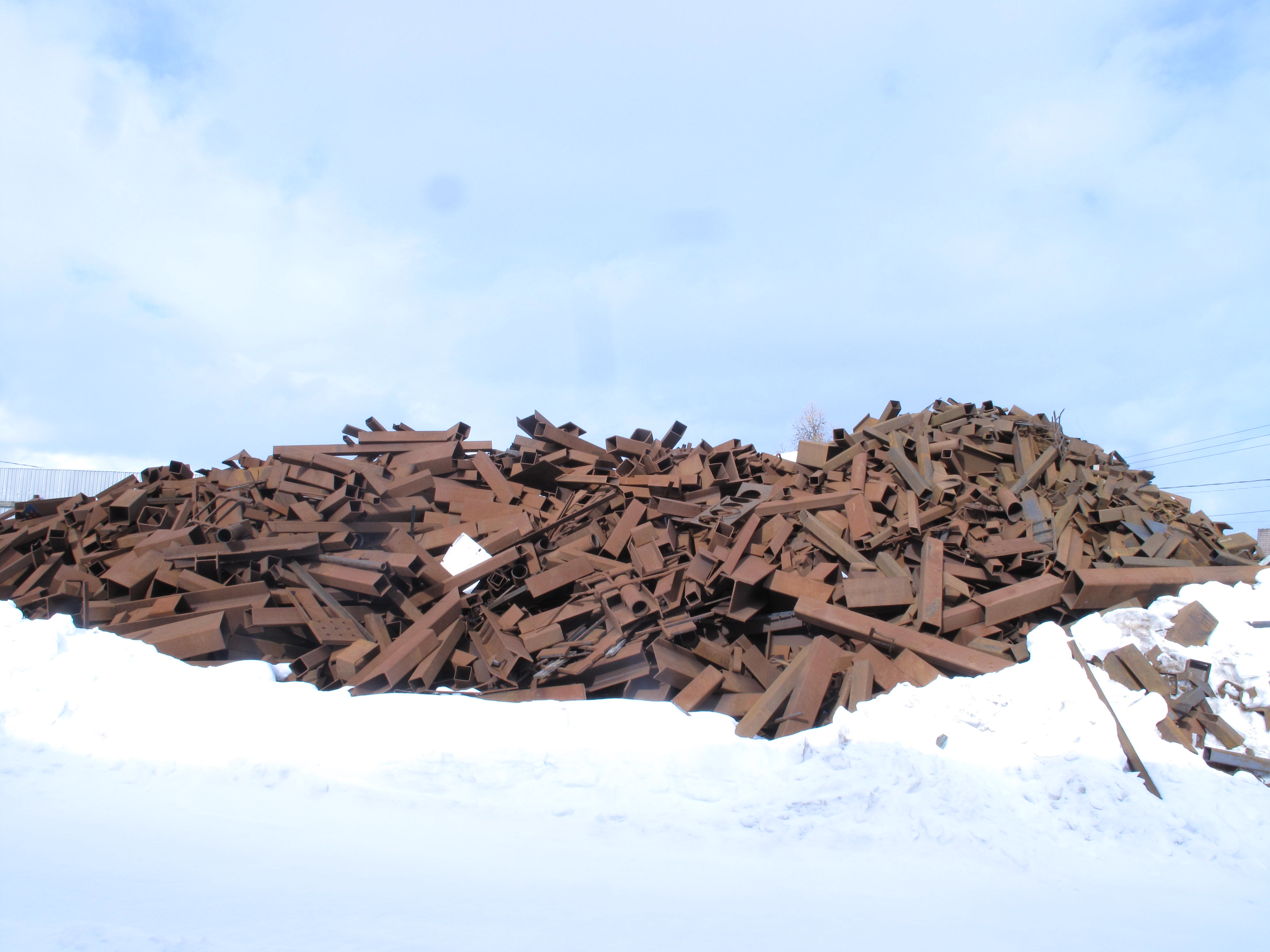
Scrap metal rusts in the snow (Finland)

The metal recycling industry encompasses a wide range of metals. The more frequently recycled metals are scrap steel, iron (ISS), lead, aluminum, copper, stainless steel, and zinc. Steel is the most recycled due to its sustainable properties. There are two main categories of metals: ferrous and non-ferrous. Metals that contain iron in them are known as ferrous.

Metals without iron are non-ferrous.

- Common non-ferrous metals are copper, brass, aluminum, zinc, magnesium, tin, nickel, and lead.
- Usable coins can be deposited in banks. Damaged US coins can be redeemed for money via the Mutilated Coin Redemption Program.

Non-ferrous metals also include precious and exotic metals:

- Precious metals are metals with a high market value in any form, such as gold, silver, and platinum group metals.
- Exotic metals contain rare elements such as cobalt, mercury, titanium, tungsten, arsenic, beryllium, bismuth, cerium, cadmium, niobium, indium, gallium, germanium, lithium, selenium, tantalum, tellurium, vanadium, and zirconium. Some types of metals are radioactive. These may be "naturally occurring" or formed by nuclear reactions. Metals that have been exposed to radioactive sources may also become radioactive in settings such as medical environments, research laboratories, and nuclear power plants.

In the United States, OSHA guidelines should be followed when recycling any type of scrap metal to ensure safety.

== Ferrous metal recycling ==
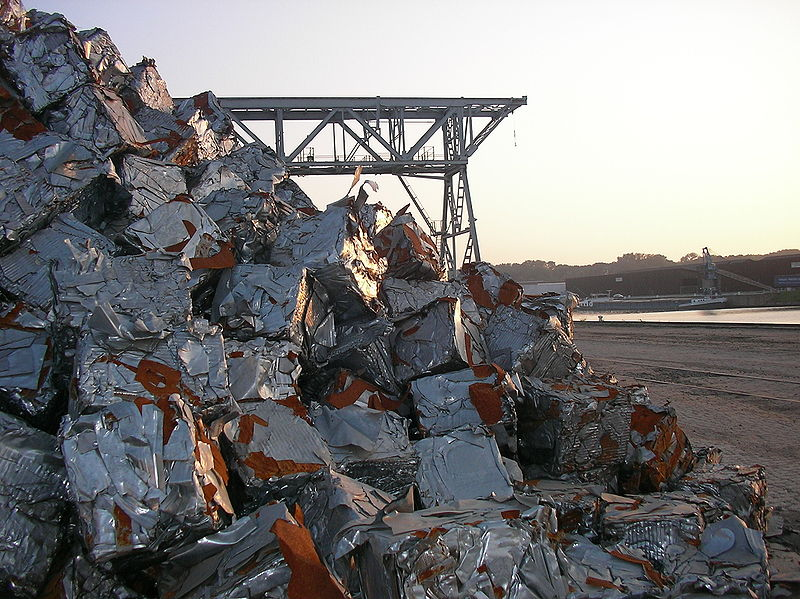
A pile of steel scrap in Brussels, waiting to be recycled

Ferrous metals are able to be recycled, with steel being one of the most recycled materials in the world. Ferrous metals contain an appreciable percentage of iron and the addition of carbon and other substances creates steel. Iron is also commonly recycled, since it is a ferrous metal.

=== Description ===
The Universal Symbol for Recyclable Steel

The CEN Symbol for Recyclable Steel

In the United States, steel containers, cans, automobiles, appliances, and construction materials contribute the greatest weight of recycled materials. For example, in 2008, more than 97% of structural steel and 106% of automobiles were recycled, comparing the current steel consumption for each industry with the amount of recycled steel being produced (the late 2000s recession and the associated sharp decline in automobile production in the US explains the over-100% calculation). A typical appliance is about 75% steel by weight and automobiles are about 65% steel and iron.

The steel industry has been actively recycling for more than 150 years, in large part because it is economically advantageous to do so. It is cheaper to recycle steel than to mine iron ore and manipulate it through the production process to form new steel. Steel does not lose any of its inherent physical properties during the recycling process, and has drastically reduced energy and material requirements compared with refinement from iron ore. The energy saved by recycling reduces the annual energy consumption of the industry by about 75%, which is enough to power eighteen million homes for one year. According to the International Resource Panel's Metal Stocks in Society report, the per capita stock of steel in use in Australia, Canada, the European Union EU15, Norway, Switzerland, Japan, New Zealand, and the US combined is 7,085 kilograms (15,620 lb) (about 860 million people in 2005).

Basic oxygen steelmaking (BOS) uses 25–35% recycled steel to make new steel. BOS steel usually contains lower concentrations of residual elements such as copper, nickel, and molybdenum, and is, therefore more malleable than electric arc furnace (EAF) steel, and is often used to make automotive fenders, tin cans, industrial drums, or any product with a large degree of cold working. EAF steelmaking uses almost 100% recycled steel. This steel contains greater concentrations of residual elements that cannot be removed through the application of oxygen and lime. It is used to make structural beams, plates, reinforcing bar, and other products that require little cold working. Downcycling of steel by hard-to-separate impurities such as copper or tin can only be prevented by well-aimed scrap selection or dilution by pure steel. Recycling one metric ton (1,000 kilograms) of steel saves 1.1 metric tons of iron ore, 630 kilograms of coal, and 55 kilograms of limestone.

=== Types of scrap used in steelmaking ===
- Heavy melting steel – Industrial or commercial scrap steel greater than 6 mm thick, such as plates, beams, columns, channels; may also include scrap machinery or implements or certain metal stampings
- Old car bodies – Vehicles with or without interiors and their original wheels
- Cast iron – Cast iron bathtubs, machinery, pipe, and engine blocks
- Pressing steel – Domestic scrap metal up to approx. 6 mm (0.24 in) thick. Examples – "White goods" (fridges, washing machines, etc.), roofing iron, water heaters, water tanks, and sheet metal offcuts
- Reinforcing bars or mesh – Used in the construction industry within concrete structures
- Turnings – Remains of drilling or shaping steels. Also known as "borings" or "swarf"
- Manganese steel – Non-magnetic, hardened steel used in the mining industry, cement mixers, rock crushers, and other high-impact and abrasive environments.
- Rails – Rail or tram tracks

=== Ship breaking ===
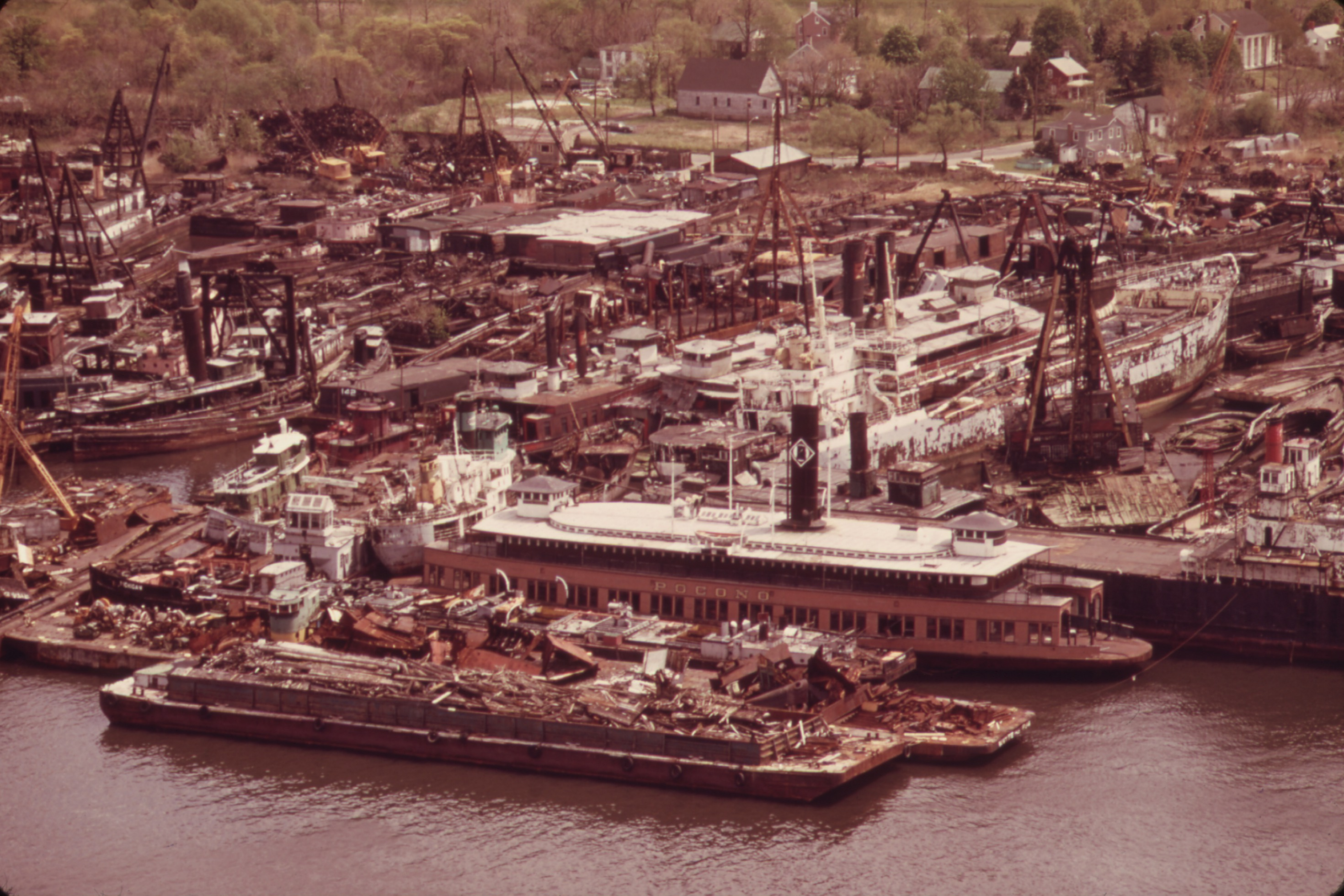
Ship breaking operations on Staten Island (c. 1973)

The hulls of ships, with any usable equipment salvaged and removed, can be broken up to provide scrap steel. For a time countries in south Asia carried out most shipbreaking, often using manual methods that were hazardous to workers and the environment. International regulations now dictate the treatment of old ships as sources of hazardous waste, so shipbreaking has returned to ports in more developed countries. In 2013, about 29 million tons of scrap steel were recovered from broken ships. Some of the scrap can be reheated and rolled to make products such as concrete reinforcing bars, or the scrap may be melted to make new steel.

== Economic role ==
=== United States ===
The scrap industry was valued at more than $90 billion in 2012, up from $54 billion in 2009 balance of trade, exporting $28 billion in scrap commodities to 160 countries. Since 2010, the industry has added more than 15,000 jobs and supports 463,000 workers, both directly and indirectly. In addition, it generates more than $10 billion in revenue for federal, state, and local governments.

Scrap recycling also helps reduce greenhouse gas emissions and conserves energy and natural resources. For example, scrap recycling diverts 135 million short tons (121,000,000 long tons; 122,000,000 t) of materials away from landfills. Recycled scrap is a raw material feedstock for nearly 60% of steel made in the US, almost 50% of the copper and copper alloys produced in the US, more than 75% of the US paper industry's needs, and for 50% of US aluminum. Recycled scrap helps keep air and water cleaner by removing potentially hazardous materials and keeping them out of landfills.

=== Canada ===
The Canadian scrap recycling industry is a cornerstone of the economy, processing over 16 million tonnes of metal annually, valued at more than $10 billion, according to the Canadian Association of Recycling Industries (CARI). Covering metals, paper, plastics, and e-waste, the industry supports over 34,000 direct jobs and drives significant exports, with the United States accounting for 92% of scrap trade under the USMCA.

Environmentally, it diverts 28% of solid waste from landfills (265 kg per capita in 2022) and supplies recycled materials for approximately 45% of global steel production, over 40% of copper production (with scrap prices ranging from CAD 0.75 to 5.15 per lb), and 33% of aluminum production (with scrap rates ranging from USD 0.85 to 1.10 per lb), thereby reducing greenhouse gas emissions by up to 90% compared to virgin material extraction. Investments in AI-based sorting technologies and Extended Producer Responsibility programs in provinces such as Ontario and British Columbia, along with CARI's advocacy to classify scrap as a commodity, are expected to fuel industry growth through 2030.

== See also ==
- Aircraft graveyard
- Aluminium recycling
- British Metals Recycling Association
- Heavy metals
- Metal prices
- Metal swarf
- Particulate matter
- Recycling by material
- Slag
- Ship breaking
- Vehicle recycling
- Wrecking yard
