= Alligator shear =

Demolition tool

An alligator shear, historically known as a lever shear and sometimes as a crocodile shear, is a metal-cutting shear with a hinged jaw, powered by a flywheel or hydraulic cylinder. Alligator shears are generally set up as stand-alone shears; however, there are types for excavators. The jaw size can range from 4 to 36 in (100 to 910 mm) long. They are generally used to cut ferrous members, such as rebar, pipe, angle iron, or I-beams.

== Operation ==
Older alligator shears were powered by a flywheel. These shears ran continuously, which posed a safety hazard. Now alligator shears are hydraulically actuated. When actuated, the piston arm extends and slowly closes the upper jaw of the alligator shear, which passes alongside the bed or lower jaw of the shear to perform the cut.

== Uses ==
Alligator shears are used for cutting long metal stock or scrap, generally where accuracy is not an important consideration, and the size or shape of the material makes other cutting or shearing options (such as a cutting torch) impractical. Alligator shears are often used in conjunction with large metal shredders in the metal recycling industry, to 'clean' or prepare scrap for shredding by removing unwanted fittings and other parts the shredder will not accept.

== Safety ==
The safety requirements for other powered metalworking shears are contained in ANSI B11.4, but alligator shears are specifically exempted from that standard. Federal OSHA and various state OSHA programs have requirements for guarding alligator shears, and newly manufactured alligator shears are provided with guards that adjust to the size of the stock or scrap being cut. The purpose of this guard, however, is to prevent pieces of metal from being ejected during cutting. Such a guard also prevents inadvertent exposure of the operator's hands, but does not conform to more stringent 'point of operation' guarding requirements.

In an interpretive letter dated June 24, 1981, Federal OSHA discussed the guarding dilemma presented by the alligator shear.

In instances where the shear is exclusively used for routine cuts on standardized stock, safeguarding of the point of operation is definable. In other instances, the operator is safeguarded from exposure to the point of operation by the physical size and configuration of the material being cut.

These practical considerations for guarding are not exclusive to alligator shears. A much more common type of equipment, the press brake, also requires a point of operation guarding when used with standardized stock, but not with large-dimension stock.
