= Châtillon, Belgium =

Place in Belgium

Châtillon
- Village
- Location in Belgium
- Coordinates: 49.6247991°N 5.6878152°E
- Country: Belgium
- Province: Luxembourg
- Municipality: Saint-Léger
- Region: Wallonia

Châtillon (French pronunciation: [ʃatijɔ̃]; Tchekion in the Gaume dialect, Schättljong or Schasteljong in Luxembourgish) is a village in the Belgian municipality of Saint-Léger, located in the Walloon region of the province of Luxembourg. Prior to a 1977 reorganization of municipalities, Châtillon was a municipality in its own right.

== Geography ==
Châtillon is located seven miles southwest of Arlon, on national highway 82 Arlon-Virton.

== Landmarks ==
Landmarks in Châtillon include the village fountain, old sawmills, 18th-century homes, the birthplace of Belgian writer Édouard Ned, and the limestone formations in the Lahage River (Ruisseau de Lahage) Valley. Stories continue to circulate of the well-known "Car Cemetery," an automobile graveyard of American-made cars brought by American and Canadian NATO troops to a mechanic in Châtillon. After France's 1966 withdrawal from NATO, the mechanic was left with hundreds of scrap cars that gradually became overgrown until a television documentary brought light to the "illegal dump." The cars were removed and crushed in October 2010.

== Famous People Born in Châtillon ==
Prominent natives of Châtillon include Belgian poet, novelist and essayist Athanase-Camille Glouden (known by his pen name Édouard Ned), and Belgian priest and World War II freedom fighter Constant Bilocq (1912-1945).

== Emigration ==
During the 19th century, several villagers of Châtillon immigrated to the United States, settling in such places as Big Spring Township, Seneca County, Ohio. Many of the Warnement families of the United States trace back to these immigrants from Châtillon.
