= Scrap metal shredder =

Machine used for reducing the size of scrap metal

A scrap metal shredder, also sometimes referred to as a metal scrap shredder, is a machine used for reducing the size of scrap metal. Scrap metal shredders come in many different variations and sizes.

== Applications ==
Some examples of scrap metal materials that are commonly shredded are:

- Tin cans
- Aluminum cans/Aluminum waste
- Tin box containers
- Tin
- Iron
- Copper tube
- Coins
- Computer recycling
- Bulk drums
- Home appliance recycling
- Television sets
- Washing machines
- Waste electrical

Car crushers are large machines that turn a car into a large bucket of scrap steel and the rest of the car into non-ferrous materials, plastics and waste called automotive shredder residue. The glass, fabric, plastic, and all other non-ferrous materials are separated by eddy current magnets in place of heavy media separation. The non-ferrous materials may be referred to as "zorba". Often the profit from the non-ferrous materials covers the operating cost for the shredder.

When a metal shredder starts, the material enters into the tear box through the feeding system. The tear blade is loaded on the box. The material is torn into small pieces through the tear, extrusion and shear of the tear blade, and is discharged from the lower part of the box.

Metal scrap recycling, also called secondary metal processing, is a large industry that processes, in the U.S. alone, 56 million tons of scrap iron and steel (including 10 million tons of scrap automobiles), 1.5 million tons of scrap copper, 2.5 million tons of scrap aluminum, 1.3 million tons of scrap lead, 300,000 tons of scrap zinc and 800,000 tons of scrap stainless steel, and smaller quantities of other metals, on a yearly basis.

== Types ==
Scrap metal shredders can be equipped with different types of cutting systems: horizontal shaft, vertical shaft, single-shaft, two-shaft, three-shaft and four-shaft cutting systems. These shredder designs can be high speed, medium speed and sometimes slow-speed systems, they always include hammermills of a vertical and horizontal shaft design, and can also include in contrast to hammer mills slow speed technology which are also used to process or shred metal and plastic and other waste materials encountered in the scrap metal industry.

The largest scrap metal shredders in the world often have 10,000 horsepower (hp) and are made by a wide range of companies. The designs originate from the 1966 patent applications of the Newell Group and the Williams Group for auto shredding or scrap metal shredding. One example is the 9,200 hp shredder from the Lynxs group at the Sims plant at the mouth of the River Usk in Newport Wales. This Lynxs shredder can process 450 cars per hour. However, the Lynxs shredders are not unique in this high hp range design. The Schnitzer Steel group installed their own custom made 10,000 hp unit in 1980, and there are many Newell Shredders that have these high hp designs. A 9,000 horsepower Mega Shredder at Sims Metal Management's Claremont Terminal in Jersey City, New Jersey processes 4,000 tons of metal a day.

== Impacts on humans and environment ==
An engineered enclosure may be used to contain noise and dust. In 2018, the California Department of Toxic Substances Control requested public comment on plans to implement enforceable operating requirements for scrap metal shredders.

In Houston, the carcinogenic substance hexavalent chromium was identified as an emission from a scrap recycling facility.

Modern large-scale scrap metal shredders are required to use air-pollution control systems—such as cyclone separators, afterburners, and baghouses—to reduce emissions of particulate matter and volatile organic compounds (VOCs), which can be generated during the shredding of coated or composite materials.

== See also ==
- Crusher
- Pollution
- Pulverizer
