= Vehicle recycling =

Dismantling of vehicles for spare parts

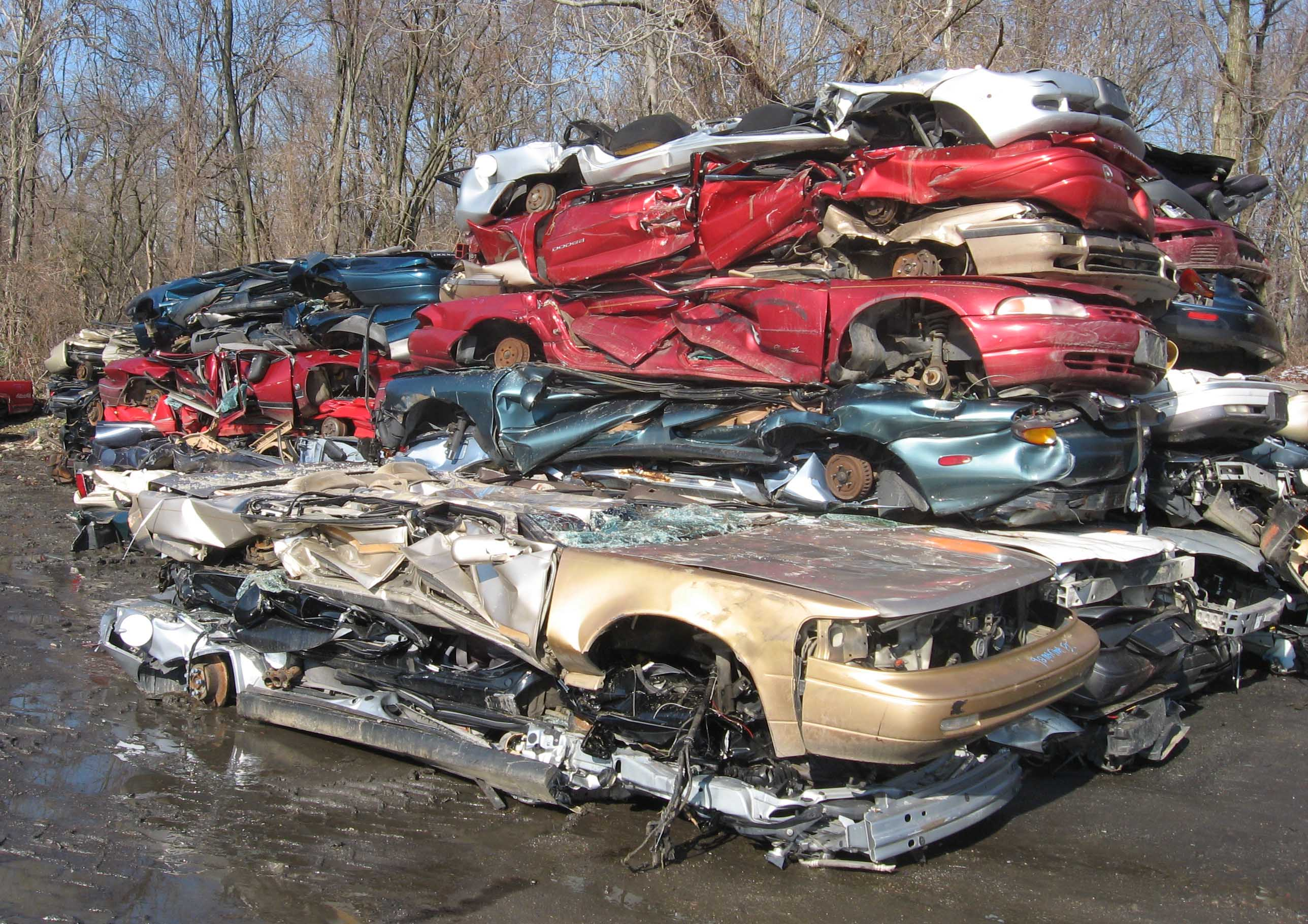
Crushed vehicles ready for transportation to a steel mill in the US

Vehicle recycling or automobile scrapping is the dismantling of vehicles for spare parts. At the end of their useful life, vehicles have value as a source of spare parts and this has created a vehicle dismantling industry. The industry has various names for its business outlets including wrecking yard, auto dismantling yard, car spare parts supplier, and recently, auto or vehicle recycling. Vehicle recycling has always occurred to some degree but in recent years manufacturers have become involved in the process. A car crusher is often used to reduce the size of scrapped vehicles for simplified transportation to a steel mill.

Approximately 12-15 million vehicles reach the end of their useful life each year in just the United States alone. These automobiles, although no longer roadworthy, can still have a purpose by giving back the metal and other recyclable materials that are contained in them. The vehicles are shredded and the metal content is recovered for recycling, while in many areas, the rest is further sorted by machine for recycling of additional materials such as glass and plastics. The remainder, known as automotive shredder residue, is put into a landfill.

The shredder residue that is not recovered for metal contains many other recyclable materials; 30% of it may be polymers, and 5-10% of it residual metals. Modern vehicle recycling attempts to be as cost-effective as possible in recycling those residual materials. Currently, 75% of the materials can be recycled, with the remaining 25% ending up in landfill. As the most recycled consumer product, end-of-life vehicles provide the steel industry with more than 14 million tons of steel per year.

== Process ==
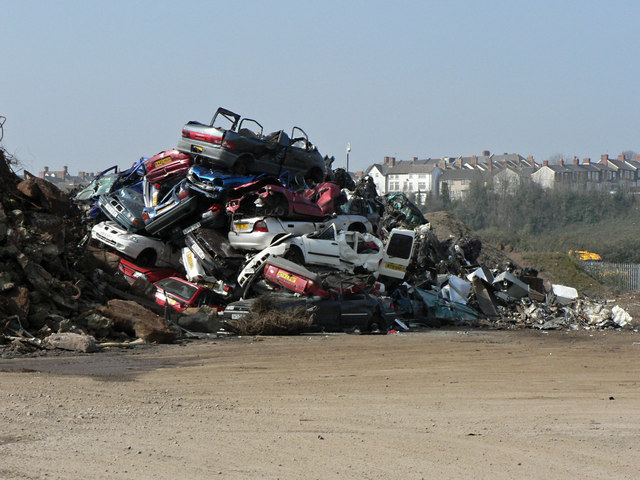
Scrap vehicles at Barry Docks

The process of recycling a vehicle is extremely complicated, as there are many parts to be recycled and many hazardous materials to remove. Briefly, the process begins with incoming vehicles being inventoried for parts. The wheels, tires, battery, and catalytic converter are removed. Fluids, such as engine coolant, oil, transmission fluid, air conditioning refrigerant, and gasoline, are drained and removed. Certain high value parts such as electronic modules, alternators, starter motors, infotainment systems - even complete engines or transmissions - may be removed if they are still serviceable and can be profitably sold in either "as-is" used condition or to a remanufacturer for restoration. The high value rare-earth magnets in electric car motors are also recyclable.

This process of removing higher value parts from the lower value vehicle body shell has traditionally been done by hand. As the process is labor intensive, it is often uneconomical to remove many of the parts. Self-serve junkyards address this in part by having customers remove parts from vehicles themselves. In this business model, cars often sit in a dedicated yard for anywhere from a few weeks to several months, and patrons can bring their own tools and remove any parts they want to buy. Once a vehicle has been in the yard for a sufficient period of time, the facility will proceed with the end-of-life vehicle scrapping and recycling process.

A technique that is on the rise is the mechanical removal of these higher value parts via machine based vehicle recycling systems (VRS). An excavator or materials handler equipped with a special attachment allows these materials to be removed quickly and efficiently. Increasing the amount of material that is recycled and increasing the value the vehicle dismantler receives from an end-of-life vehicle (ELV). Other hazardous materials such as mercury and sodium azide (the propellant used in air bags) may also be removed.

After all of the parts and products inside are removed, the remaining shell of the vehicle is sometimes subject to further processing, which includes removal of the air conditioner evaporator and heater core, and wiring harnesses. The remaining shell is then crushed flat, or cubed, to facilitate economical transportation in bulk to an industrial shredder or hammer mill, where the vehicles are further reduced to fist-sized chunks of metal. Glass, plastic and rubber are removed from the mix, and the metal is sold by multiple tons to steel mills for recycling.

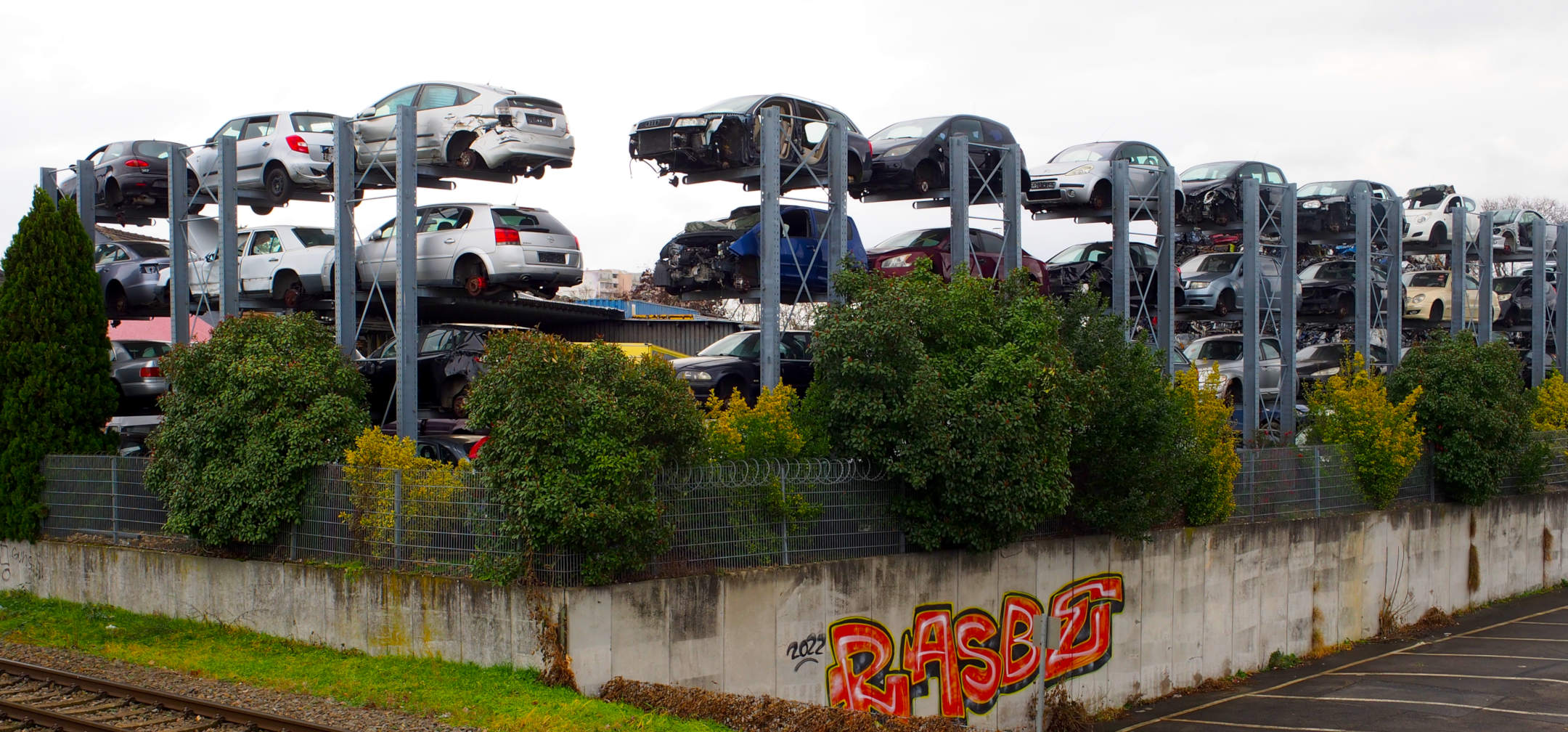
Cars waiting to be recycled

== Benefits ==
Recycling steel saves energy and natural resources. The steel industry saves enough energy to power about 18 million households for a year, on a yearly basis. Recycling metal also uses about 74 percent less energy than making metal. Thus, recyclers of end-of-life vehicles save an estimated 85 million barrels of oil annually that would have been used in the manufacturing of other parts. Likewise, car recycling keeps 11 million tons of steel and 800,000 non-ferrous metals out of landfills and back in consumer use.

Before the 2003 model year, some vehicles that were manufactured were found to contain mercury auto switches, historically used in convenience lighting and antilock braking systems. Recyclers remove and recycle this mercury before the vehicles are shredded to prevent it from escaping into the environment. In 2007, over 950 kilograms (2,100 lb) of mercury were collected by 6,265 recyclers.

Consumers can also financially benefit from recycling certain car parts such as tires and catalytic converters.

== Policies ==
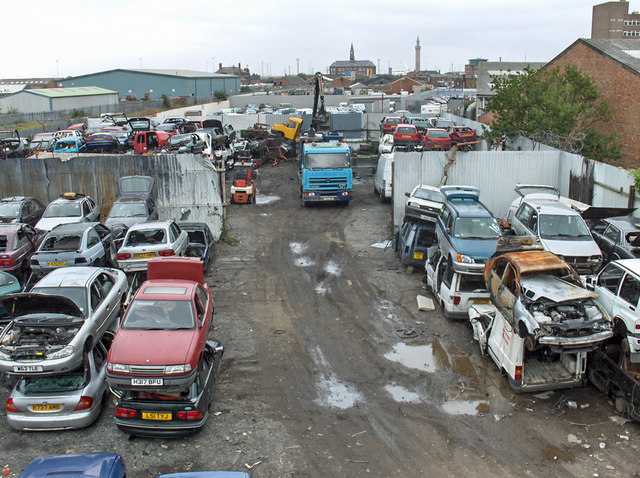
Car scrapyard in Grimsby, UK

=== European Union ===
In 1997, the European Commission adopted a Proposal for a Directive which aims at making vehicle dismantling and recycling more environmentally friendly by setting clear targets for the recycling of vehicles. This proposal encouraged many in Europe to consider the environmental impact of end-of-life vehicles. In September 2000, the End of Life Vehicles Directive was officially adopted by the EP and Council. Over the next decade, more legislation would be adopted in order to clarify legal aspects, national practices, and recommendations.

A number of vehicle manufacturers collaborated on developing the International Dismantling Information System to meet the legal obligations of the End of Life Vehicles Directive.

In 2018 the EC published a study Assessment of ELV Directive with emphasis on the end of life vehicles of unknown whereabouts. This study demonstrates that each year the whereabouts of 3 to 4 million ELVs across the EU is unknown and that the stipulation in the ELV Directive are not sufficient to monitor the performance of single Member States for this aspect. The study proposed and assessed a number of options to improve the legal provisions of the ELV Directive.

=== United States ===
On 2 July 2009 and for the next 55 days, the Car Allowance Rebate System, or “Cash for Clunkers”, was an attempt at a green initiative by the United States Government in order to stimulate automobile sales and improve the average fuel economy of the United States. Many cars ended up being destroyed and recycled in order to fulfill the program, and even some exotic cars were crushed. Ultimately, as carbon footprints are of concern, some will argue that the “Cash for Clunkers” did not reduce many owners’ carbon footprints. A lot of carbon dioxide is added into the atmosphere to make new cars. It is calculated that if someone traded in an 18 mpg clunker for a 22 mpg new car, it would take five and a half years of typical driving to offset the new car's carbon footprint. That same number increases to eight or nine years for those who bought trucks.

If a vehicle is abandoned on the roadside or in empty lots, licensed dismantlers in the United States can legally obtain them so that they are safely converted into reusable or recycled commodities.

=== Canada ===
In early 2009, a voluntary program, called Retire Your Ride, was launched by the Government of Canada to encourage motorists across the country to give up their old vehicles that emit pollutants. A total of 50,000 vehicles manufactured in 1995 or in years prior were targeted for permanent retirement.

Recyclers offer $150- $1000 for the cars with an original catalytic converter. These prices are influenced by metal rates, location, make/model of the vehicle.

=== United Kingdom ===
Between 2009–10, the United Kingdom introduced the scrappage incentive scheme that paid GBP2,000 in cash for cars registered on or before 31 August 1999. The high payout was to help old-vehicle owners purchase new and less-polluting ones.

In the United Kingdom the term cash for cars also relates to the purchase of cars immediately for cash from car buying companies without the need of advertising. There are however legal restrictions to level of cash that can be used within a business transaction to buy a vehicle. The EU sets this at 10,000 euros or currency equivalent as part of its Money Laundering Regulations.

In the UK it is no longer possible to purchase scrap cars for cash with the introduction of the Scrap Metal Dealers Act in 2013. As a result, firms in the scrap my car industry can no longer pay cash for cars. Instead, these firms now pay by bank transfer.

=== Australia ===
In Australia, the term cash for cars is also synonymous with car removal. Only in Victoria, companies must acquire a LMCT and other relevant processing licenses before the procurement of vehicles. Some time it takes to check every vehicles history and After that It can be processed for wrecking and recycling purposes. Both Cash For Cars and Car Removals services are asked for cars coming to the end of their road life.

=== New Zealand ===
New Zealand motor vehicle fleet increased 61 percent from 1.5 million in 1986 to over 2.4 million by June 2003. By 2015 it almost reached 3.9 million. This is where scrapping has increased since 2014. Cash For Cars is a term used for Car Removal/Scrap Car where wreckers pay cash for old/wrecked/broken vehicles depending on age/model.

== See also ==
- Automotive oil recycling
- Automotive shredder residue
- Car battery recycling
- Circular economy#Automotive industry
- Transport and the environment
- Vehicle recovery (military)
