= Automotive shredder residue =

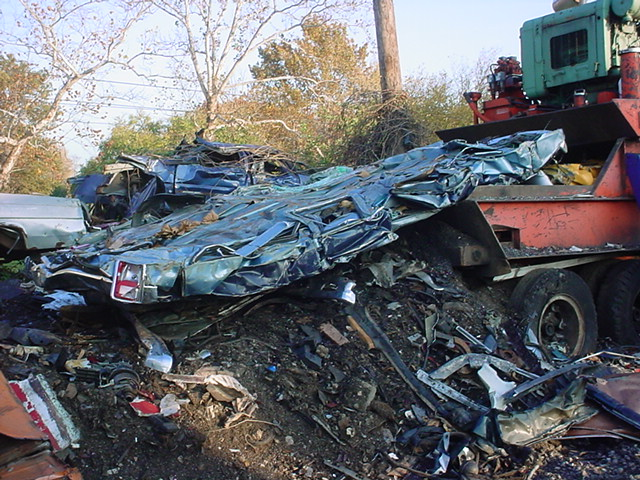
a blue 1990s Lincoln Town Car after crushing, with residue visible beneath

The shredding of automobiles and major household appliances is a process where a hammermill acts as a giant tree chipper by grinding the materials fed into it to fist-size pieces. The shredding of automobiles results in a mixture of ferrous metal, non-ferrous metal (e.g. alloys of copper and aluminium) and shredder waste, called automotive shredder residue or automobile shredder residue (ASR). ASR consists of glass, fiber, rubber, automobile liquids, plastics and dirt. ASR is sometimes differentiated into shredder light fraction and dust. Sometimes these residual materials are called "car-fluff".

ASR often contains hazardous substances such as lead, cadmium, and PCB. Therefore, some countries have classified ASR as hazardous waste and have established legislative controls.

== Recycling ==
It is estimated that every year in EU nations nearly 3 million tonnes of automotive shredder residue (ASR) are generated. While half of the waste which contains rubber, textiles and plastics can be transferred into alternative fuels or recycled, the remaining portion is primarily land-filled. The European Draft directive 2000/53/CE states that by the year 2015, only 5% of the vehicle's weight can be disposed of at landfill sites.

=== Recycling techniques ===
ASR waste contains 30% organic matter and inorganic compounds such as lead, zinc, quartz, calcite, magnetite, anhydrite and hematite. Some of the methods to recycle ASR are:

- Using as a retarder for ordinary Portland cement by transformation into aggregates after thermal treatment followed by chemical treatment.
- Conversion of automobile plastic residue into synthetic crude oil. This technology is patented by Agilyx.
- Recycling thermoplastic materials from residue plastic which can be used in construction and agriculture sector.
- Use of thermo-chemical processes, such as pyrolysis or gasification.

== See also ==
- Car crusher
- Bulky waste
- Industrial shredder
