= Car crusher =

Industrial device used to reduce size of cars

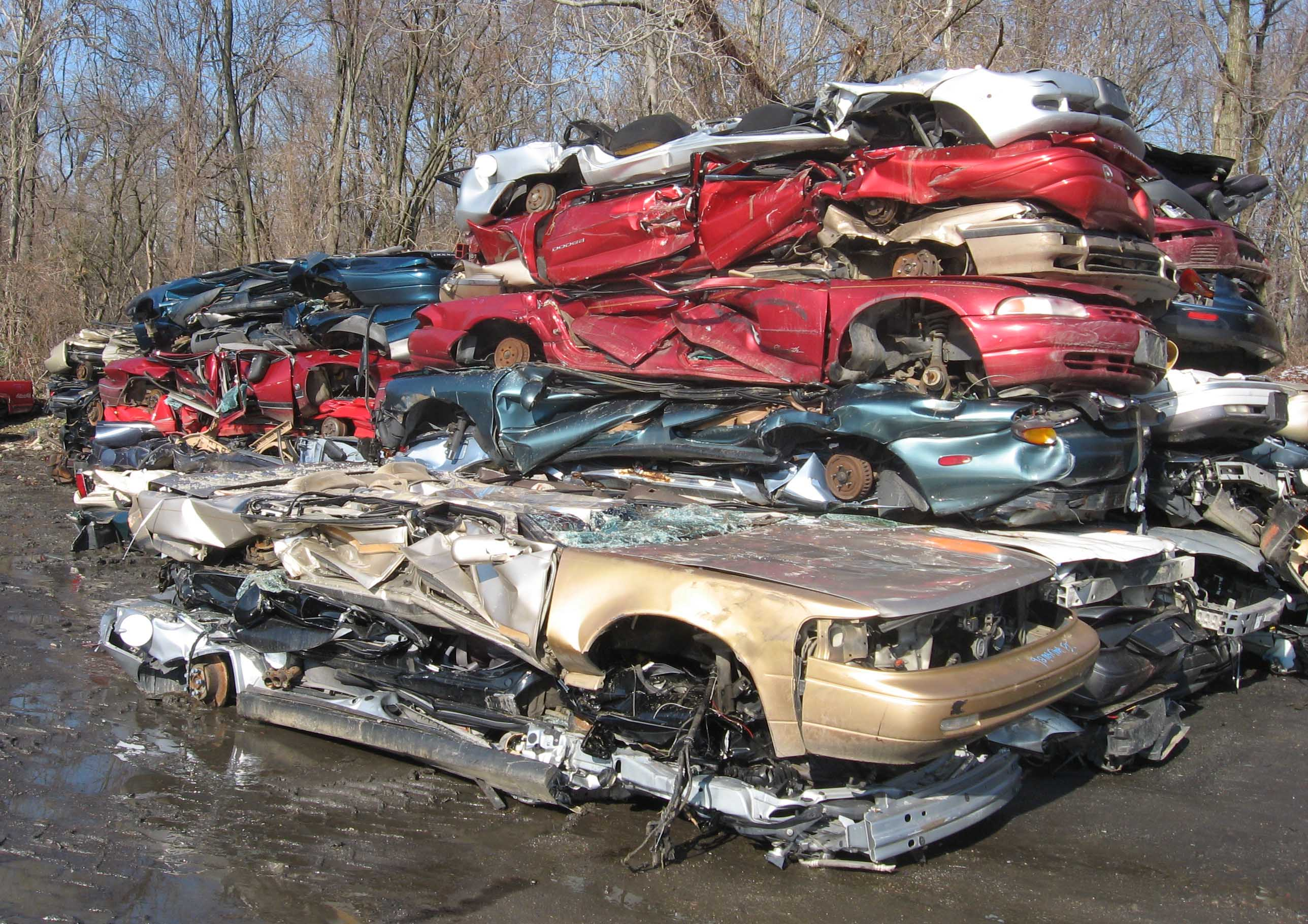
Stacks of crushed cars

A car crusher is an industrial device used to reduce the dimensions of derelict (depreciated) cars prior to transport for recycling.

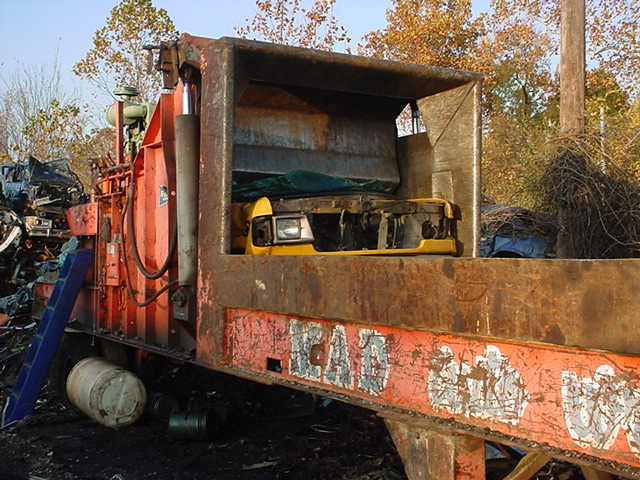
A Ford van being crushed in St. Louis, Missouri

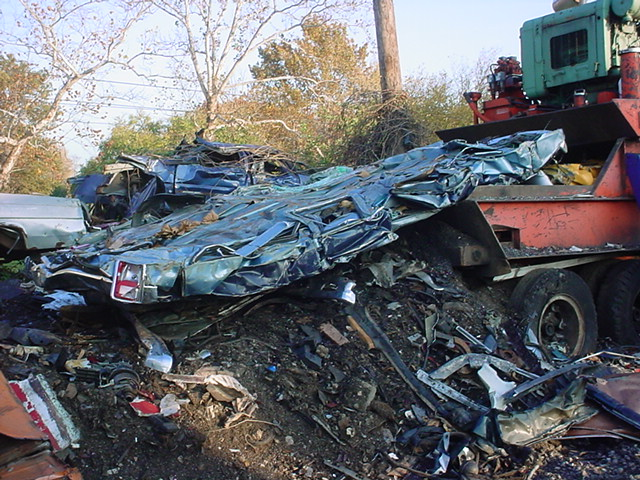
A blue 1990s Lincoln Town Car that has been crushed

Historically, scrap cars were too large and bulky to transport to the sites that turned them into reusable material, and the cost to transport them outweighed their value, because transportation costs were determined by weight. Since uncrushed cars were less dense and took up more space, even for a short haul, the scrap cars were worth less than it cost to deliver them.

A Mitsubishi Pajero SUV being crushed by a grapple crane

Cars can be crushed by dropping heavy weights onto them, or by using an excavator bucket or mechanical grab, but these rudimentary means can be time-consuming and produces inconsistent scrap sizes. By contrast, having a dedicated car-crushing machine speeds up the compacting process and results in more uniform scrap bundles.

== Types of car crushers ==
Car crushers are essentially a type of hydraulic compactor and subdivide into two basic types; the pancake crusher where the vehicle is flattened vertically into a slab, or the baler which crushes and compresses the vehicle from several directions into a dense rectangular cube or "bale".

Both types can be mounted onto a semi trailer – the transportable mobile car crusher – to allow it to crush and collect vehicles from multiple junkyards who do not own their own machine.

Shredding machines also have a crushing action which will reduce the height of the vehicle before it is finally pulverized into fragments by spinning rotors.

=== Car crushing machine ===
One of the first car crushing machines was invented by Allen B. Sharp and Richard A. Hull, both assignors to Al-Jon Incorporated located in Ottumwa, Iowa. The patent for the machine was filed on March 22, 1965, and patented on August 16, 1966. This United States patent was primarily examined by Walter A. Scheel.

With this car crushing machine, a car is fed through a hydraulically powered jaw and is slowly flattened as it goes through, similar to how a pasta machine flattens pasta dough. The car scraps are flattened into dimensions of six inches tall by five to six feet wide, similar to the length of its original size. The machine's portable design allows it to be transported to any location where cars have been collected, as it is within legal highway transport size limits. The machine can be operated by a single person.

=== Mobile car crusher ===
The mobile car crusher was invented by Charlie Roy Hall in the city of Wadley, Georgia, in 1996, and was patented on August 12, 1997. The primary examiner of this United States patent was Stephen F. Gerrity. As a condensed version of a standard car crusher, a mobile car crusher has a smaller opening with lower output, so it can crush only smaller sized, C-segment cars. This machine's mobility stems from its dual functionality: a travel mode for highways, where the hydraulic cylinder guiding posts are lowered, and a working mode, where they are raised. Two guiding posts, one on each side of the machine, house the hydraulic cylinders. These posts shield the cylinders from external interference. The hydraulic cylinders apply pressure to the car, with a crusher hood distributing the force evenly to crush the entire vehicle. A heavy-duty lowboy trailer, attached to the bottom, allows transport only by semi-trailer trucks. Increased car production created a high demand for scrap metal, so the mobile car crusher was developed to increase the efficiency of gathering it. Decreasing car lifespans also meant more vehicles were being sent to large, centralized crushing facilities. Consequently, these facilities needed to outsource to mobile car crushers to manage the increased volume of automobiles.

=== Baling press ===
Baling presses are used for the compaction of general scrap material, but are popularly used for automobile body shells. They generally consist of two hydraulically-powered hinged "wings", which fold the vehicle in half, pressing it into a rectangular "log". Once the wings are fully closed, pusher plates, again powered by hydraulics, squeeze the log along its axis from one or both ends until a dense cube or "bale" is formed, which is then either ejected from a door at the end of the machine or removed by a crane. Some baling presses have a guillotine shear which chops the bale or log into smaller pieces. Baling presses, like mobile car crushers, can be mounted on a semi-trailer so that it can be transported between automobile recycling yards. The bales are then forwarded on to an automobile shredding plant for further processing.

As the compacted bales can be too dense for shredding plants to handle, they are often fed through a pre-shredder or "bale breaker". The bale is sent through two large contrarotating spiked wheels which literally pull the bale apart and shear it into smaller pieces. Entire cars can be fed through a pre-shredding plant as an alternative to baling. This is done at some metal processing yards.

=== Scrap shredder ===
Shredders are normally the final stage in the destruction of a derelict automobile, pulverizing it into fist-sized pieces. Sometimes called fragementisers they are essentially hammermills built on an industrial scale. Other types of shredder are essentially scaled-up versions of conventional paper shredders with two rotors that turn continuously in opposite directions, shearing the vehicle and tearing it into pieces. These types of shredders are often called pre-shredders or bale breakers as they can tear apart flattened or baled (cubed) vehicles from primary crushing processes so that they can be more easily handled by hammermill/fragementiser-type shredders. Pre-shredding plants can also accept uncrushed vehicles directly.

== Car crushers in popular culture ==
Car crushers have been popular in films as devices of murder or humour. They have appeared in such well known films as Goldfinger (destroying a Lincoln Continental with a body inside), Cleopatra Jones, National Lampoon's Vacation, I'll Never Forget What's'isname, Kick-Ass, Superman III, Gone in 60 Seconds, Pulp Fiction, Strul, and Mickey One.

They have also appeared in several television shows including Mathnet's The Case of the Great Car Robbery. Joe Howard's character, George Frankly hid in a to-be-stolen car, and the other characters thought he was still in the car after it was flattened by the crusher.

A car crusher was used to dispose of Walt and Jesse's RV containing a mobile meth lab in season three of Breaking Bad.

A car crusher appeared in the junkyard scene of the Kushner-Locke/Disney film The Brave Little Toaster.

A car crusher also appears in the video games Grand Theft Auto 2 where it generates power-ups depending on car model and is also used in an assassination mission. It also appears in Grand Theft Auto III, Grand Theft Auto: Liberty City Stories, and Mafia II where the player can make money from stealing cars and taking them to the crusher.

A car crusher also featured in Need for Speed: The Run, where the protagonist is seen tied to the steering wheel of his Porsche 911 (997), which is in a junkyard and dropped into a crusher as a method of being killed by a criminal organization known as "The Mob". He is about to be crushed to death, but he manages to untie himself and escape the crusher. He sneaks out and steals an Audi RS4 in order to escape, but he is chased by multiple Porsche Cayennes in use by The Mob, from which he is able to escape.

A car crusher also appeared in the Drake music video of "Family Matters." As part of the Drake–Kendrick Lamar feud, the car crusher in the video is shown crushing a red van that matches the van on the cover artwork of Kendrick Lamar's album, Good Kid, M.A.A.D City.

== See also ==
- César Baldaccini, a baled car artist, now deceased
- James Squillante, a mobster reputedly crushed in his own car
- Scrap metal shredder
- Vehicle recycling
