= List of castles and châteaux in Belgium =

This is an incomplete list of castles and châteaux in Belgium. (Note: There are about 3,000 castles in Belgium (Eupedia.com 2014).) The Dutch word kasteel and the French word château refer both to fortified defensive buildings (castles proper) and to stately aristocratic homes (châteaux, manor houses or country houses). As a result, it is common to see the name of both types of building translated into English as 'castle', which can sometimes be misleading. Combined with the complication that some aristocratic homes were once intended for defence, here they have not been separated into two groups, and most buildings of both types are labelled as 'castles' in this list. Many members of the old Belgian noble families still live in castles (see Belgian nobility).

== Brussels-Capital Region ==
Name	Location	Note	Image
Belvédère Château; Château du Belvédère / Kasteel Belvédère	Laeken	Residence of King Albert II	
Château de la Solitude (Kasteel La Solitude)	Auderghem		
Château Malou (Maloukasteel)	Woluwe-Saint-Lambert		
Château of Stuyvenberg; Château du Stuyvenberg / Kasteel van Stuyvenberg	Laeken	Official Residence of the Archduke and Archduchess of Austria-Este	
Château of Trois-Fontaines; Château de Trois-Fontaines / Kasteel Dry Borren	Auderghem		
Château of Val Duchesse; Château de Val Duchesse / Kasteel van Hertoginnedal	Auderghem		
Château Sainte-Anne (Sint-Annakasteel)	Auderghem		
Egmont Palace; Palais d'Egmont / Egmontpaleis	City of Brussels		
Karreveld Castle; Château de Karreveld / Kasteelhoeve van Karreveld	Molenbeek		
Palace of Coudenberg; Palais du Coudenberg / Coudenbergpaleis	City of Brussels	Destroyed in 1731, parts visible underneath the modern city	
Rivieren Castle; Château de Rivieren / Kasteel ter Rivieren	Ganshoren		
Royal Castle of Laeken; Château royal de Laeken / Koninklijk Kasteel van Laken	Laeken	Residence of the King of the Belgians	
Royal Palace of Brussels; Palais royal de Bruxelles / Koninklijk Paleis van Brussel	City of Brussels	Official residence of the Belgian Court	
Stoclet Palace; Palais Stoclet / Stocletpaleis	Woluwe-Saint-Pierre		

== Flanders ==
=== Antwerp province ===
Name	Location	Note	Image
Altena Castle (Kasteel van Altena)	Kontich		
Arendsnest Castle (Kasteel Arendsnest)	Edegem		
Battenbroek Castle (Kasteel Battenbroek)	Walem, Mechelen		
Bautersemhof Castle (Kasteel Bautersemhof)	Zandhoven		
Hof ter Beke	Wilrijk		
Befferhof Castle (Kasteel Befferhof)	Bonheiden		
Berentrode Castle (Kasteel Berentrode)	Bonheiden		
Berlaarhof Castle (Kasteel Berlaarhof)	Berlaar		
Beukenhof Castle (Kasteel Beukenhof)	Kapellen		
De Bist Castle (Ekeren) (Kasteel de Bist)	Ekeren		
De Bist Castle (Kessel) (Kasteel de Bist)	Kessel		
De Bocht Castel (Kasteel De Bocht)	Willebroek		
Boeckenberg Castle (Kasteel Boeckenberg)	Deurne		
Hof ter Borght	Westmeerbeek		
Borrekens Castle (Kasteel Borrekens)	Vorselaar		
Hof ten Bos	Heist-op-den-Berg		
Bossenstein Castle (Kasteel Bossenstein)	Broechem		
Bouwel Castle (Kasteel van Bouwel)	Bouwel		
Kasteel van de hertogen van Brabant	Turnhout		
Bouckenborgh Castle (Kasteel Bouckenborgh)	Merksem		
Hof van Bouwel	Bouwel		
Brasschaat Castle (Kasteel van Brasschaat)	Brasschaat		
Broydenborg Castle (Kasteel Broydenborg)	Hoboken		
Buerstede Castle (Kasteel de Buerstede)	Aartselaar		
Hof van Busleyden	Mechelen		
Cantecroy Castle (Kasteel Cantecroy)	Mortsel		
Cappenberg Castle (Kasteel Cappenberg)	Hove		
Cleydael Castle (Kasteel Cleydael)	Aartselaar		
Couwelaer Castle (Kasteel de Couwelaer)	Deurne		
Doggenhout Castle (Kasteel Doggenhout)	Ranst		
Baron Dufour Castle (Kasteel Baron Dufour)	Retie		
Dulft Castle (Kasteelmotte De Dulft)	Bornem		
Hof ter Elst	Edegem		
Ter Elst Castle (Kasteel ter Elst)	Duffel		
Ertbrugge Castle (Kasteel Ertbrugge) or Hof van Franck	Deurne		
Fruithof Castle (Kasteel Fruithof)	Boechout		
Hof van Savoye	Mechelen		
Gestelhof Castle (Kasteel Gestelhof)	Gestel, Berlaar		
Ginhoven Castle (Kasteel Ginhoven)	Wuustwezel		
Gravenhof Castle (Kasteel Gravenhof)	Hoboken		
Het Gravenkasteel	Lippelo		
's Gravenwezel Castle (Kasteel 's Gravenwezel)	's-Gravenwezel		
Groenendaal Castle (Kasteel Groenendaal)	Merksem		
Groeningenhof Castle (Kasteel Groeningenhof)	Kontich		
Hallehof Castle (Kasteel Hallehof)	Halle, Zoersel		
Hemelhof Castle (Kasteel Hemelhof)	Bornem		
Hemiksemhof Castle (Kasteel Hemiksemhof)	Hemiksem		
Herlaar Castle (Kasteel Herlaar)	Herenthout		
Heuvelhof	Boechout		
Hof-en-Berg Castle (Kasteel Hof-en-Berg)	Puurs		
Hof ter Vijvers Castle (Kasteel Hof ter Vijvers)	Kapellen		
Hollaken Castle (Kasteel van Hollaken)	Rijmenam		
Hoogstraten Castle (Kasteel van Hoogstraten)	Hoogstraten		
Hovorst Castle (Kasteel Hovorst)	Viersel		
Hulgenrode Castle (Kasteel Hulgenrode)	Wommelgem		
Hof d'Intere	Wechelderzande		
Irishof Castle (Kasteel Irishof)	Kapellen		
Hof van Kalesberg	Schoten		
Kijkuit Castle (Kasteel Kijkuit)	Wijnegem		
Klaverblad Castle (Kasteel Klaverblad)	Wilrijk		
Koolhem Castle (Kasteel Koolhem)	Puurs		
Hof ter Laken	Booischot		
Hof van Lasson	Stabroek		
Hof van Liere	Zandhoven		
Hof ter Linden	Edegem		
Castle De Lindenhof	Lint		
Hof van Massenhoven	Massenhoven		
Meerlaar Castle (Kasteel Meerlaar)	Vorst		
Meerlenhof Castle (Kasteel Meerlenhof)	Hoboken		
Hof te Melis	Lippelo		
Mikhof Castle (Kasteel Mikhof)	Brasschaat		
Nieuw Laarhof Castle (Kasteel Nieuw Laarhof)	Ekeren		
Bornem Castle (Kasteel de Marnix de Sainte-Aldegonde)	Bornem		
Maxburg Castle (Kasteel Maxburg)	Meer, Hoogstraten		
De Meeus d'Argenteuil Castle (Kasteel de Meeus d'Argenteuil)	Westerlo		
Castle de Merode (Kasteel de Merode)	Westerlo		
Kasteel van gravin Jeanne de Merode or Nieuw Kasteel	Westerlo		
Monnikkenhof	Hemiksem		
Mussenborg Castle (Kasteel Mussenborg)	Edegem		
Nielerbroek Castle (Kasteel Nielerbroek)	Niel		
Pelgrimhof	Heist-op-den-Berg		
Planckendael Castle (Kasteel Planckendael)	Muizen, Mechelen		
Pulhof Castle (Kasteel Pulhof)	Wijnegem		
Gemeentehuis Putte	Putte		
Rameyen Castle (Hof van Rameyen)	Gestel, Berlaar		
Rattennest Castle (Kasteel Rattennest)	Hove		
Ravenhof Castle (Kasteel Ravenhof)	Stabroek		
Hof van Reet	Reet		
Renesse Castle (Kasteel van Renesse)	Oostmalle		
Rethy Castle (Kasteel van Rethy)	Retie		
Hof van Riemen	Heist-op-den-Berg		
Hof van Ringen	Lier		
Hof van Roosendaal	Merksem		
Ruisbroek Castle (Kasteel van Ruisbroek)	Ruisbroek, Puurs		
Runcvoort Castle (Kasteel Runcvoort)	Merksem		
Schilde Castle (Kasteel van Schilde)	Schilde		
Schoonselhof	Wilrijk		
Schoten Castle (Kasteel van Schoten)	Schoten		
Schravenhage Castle (Kasteel Schravenhage)	Noorderwijk		
Selsaette Castle (Kasteel Selsaete)	Wommelgem		
Solhof Castle (Kasteel Solhof)	Aartselaar		
Sorghvliedt Castle (Kasteel Sorghvliedt)	Hoboken		
Spokenhof	Boechout		
Het Steen	Antwerp	medieval castle	
Sterckshof	Deurne		
Steytelinck Castle (Kasteel Steytelinck)	Wilrijk		
Terdonck Castle (Kasteel Terdonck)	Muizen, Mechelen		
Tielen Castle (Kasteel van Tielen)	Tielen		
Turnhout Castle (Kasteel van Turnhout)	Turnhout		
D'Ursel Castle (Kasteel d'Ursel)	Hingene		
Ter Varent Castle (Kasteel ter Varent)	Mortsel		
Hof van Veltwijck	Ekeren		
Vorselaar Castle (Kasteel van Vorselaar)	Vorselaar		
Vorst-Meerlaer Castle (Kasteel van Vorst-Meerlaer)	Laakdal		
Veerle Castle (Kasteel van Veerle)	Laakdal		
Vredenborch Castle (Kasteel Vredenborch)	Boechout		
Vredestein Castle (Kasteel Vredestein)	Bonheiden		
Vrieselhof	Oelegem		
Westmalle Castle (Kasteel van Westmalle)	Westmalle		
Weyninckhove Castle (Kasteel Weyninckhove)	Hove		
Zellaer Castle (Kasteel van Zellaer)	Bonheiden		
Zoerselhof	Zoersel		
Zwarte Arend Castle (Kasteel Zwarte Arend)	Deurne		

=== East Flanders ===
Name	Location	Note	Image
Achtendries Castle (Kasteel Achtendries)	Oostakker		
Acker Castle (Kasteel van Acker)	Destelbergen		
Altena Castle (Kasteel van Altena)	Kruibeke		
Astene Castle (Kasteel van Astene)	Astene		
Aveschoot Castle (Kasteel van Aveschoot)	Lembeke		
Boelare Castle (Kasteel van Boelare)	Geraardsbergen		
Baudries Castle (Kasteel Baudries)	Gavere		
Beerlegem Castle (Kasteel van Beerlegem)	Beerlegem		
Beervelde Castle (Kasteel van Beervelde)	Beervelde		
Berlare Castle (Kasteel van Berlare)	Berlare		
Ten Bieze Castle (Kasteel Ten Bieze)	Beerlegem		
Bueren Castle (Kasteel de Bueren)	Melle-Kwatrecht		
Blauwendael Castle (Kasteel Blauwendael)	Waasmunster		
Blauw Huys Castle (Kasteel Blauw Huys)	Drongen		
de Blondel de Beauregard Castle (Kasteel van Blondel de Beauregard)	Viane		
Ten Boekel Castle (Kasteel Ten Boekel)	Evergem		
Borgwal Castle (Kasteel Borgwal)	Gavere		
Borluut Castle (Kasteel Borluut)	Sint-Denijs-Westrem		
Bosdam Castle (Kasteel Bosdam)	Beveren		
Braem Castle (Braemkasteel)	Gentbrugge		
Breivelde Castle (Kasteel Domein Breivelde)	Grotenberge		
Goed ten Broeke	Evergem		
Claeys-Bouüaert Castle (Kasteel Claeys-Bouüaert)	Mariakerke		
Coninxdonk Castle (Kasteel Coninxdonk)	Gentbrugge		
Cortewalle Castle (Kasteel Cortewalle)	Beveren-Waas		
Crabbenburg Castle (Kasteel Crabbenburg)	Destelbergen		
De Campagne Castle (Kasteel De Campagne)	Drongen		
Diepenbroeck Castle (Kasteel Diepenbroeck)	Lovendegem		
Doornzele Castle (Kasteel Doornzele)	Doornzele, Evergem		
Dreefkasteel	Vinderhoute		
Geeraard de Duivelsteen	Ghent	medieval castle	
Egmont Castle (Egmontkasteel)	Zottegem		
Elslo Castle (Kasteel te Elslo)	Evergem		
Eremyten Hof	Evergem		
Gaverkracht Castle (Kasteel Gaverkracht)	Vinderhoute		
de Gerlache Castle (Kasteel de Gerlache)	Mullem		
Gravensteen	Ghent	medieval castle	
Graventoren Castle (Burchtruïne Graventoren)	Rupelmonde		
Groeneveld Castle (Kasteel Groeneveld)	Evergem		
Hansbeke Castle (Kasteel van Hansbeke)	Hansbeke		
Herzele Castle (Kasteelruïne van Herzele)	Herzele		
Heylwegen Castle (Kasteel Heylwegen)	Evergem		
Hof ter Kruizen	Kaprijke		
Kruishoutem Castle (Kasteel van Kruishoutem)	Kruishoutem		
Laarne Castle (Kasteel van Laarne)	Laarne		
Landegem Castle (Kasteel van Landegem)	Landegem		
Laresteen Castle (Kasteel Laresteen)	Lovendegem		
Leeuwergem Castle (Kasteel van Leeuwergem)	Leeuwergem		
Ter Leyen Castle (Kasteel Ter Leyen)	Boekhoute		
Hof van Lier Castle (Kasteel Hof van Lier)	Zandbergen		
Lippens Castle (Kasteel Lippens)	Moerbeke-Waas		
Lozer Castle (Kasteel Lozer)	Lozer, Kruishoutem		
Mariahoeve Castle (Kasteel Mariahoeve)	Bellem		
Maaltebrugge Castle (Maaltebruggekasteel)	Ghent		
Mesen Castle (Kasteel van Mesen)	Lede		
Moorsel Castle (Kasteel van Moorsel)	Moorsel		
Nazareth Castle (Kasteel van Nazareth)	Nazareth		
Neigem Castle (Kasteel van Neigem)	Ninove		
Nokere Castle (Kasteel van Nokere)	Nokere		
Notax Castle (Kasteel Notax)	Destelbergen		
Ocket Castle (Kasteel Ocket)	Heusden		
Olsene Castle (Kasteel van Olsene)	Olsene, Zulte		
Ooidonk Castle (Kasteel van Ooidonk)	Bachte-Maria-Leerne		
Ortegat Castle (Kasteel Ortegat)	Waasmunster		
Oudeberg Castle (Kasteel Oudeberg)	Geraardsbergen		
de Oude Kluis Castle (Kasteel de Oude Kluis)	Gentbrugge		
Oudenwal Castle (Kasteel Oudenwal)	Lovendegem		
de Pélichy Castle (Kasteel de Pélichy)	Gentbrugge		
New Petegem-aan-de-Schelde Castle (Nieuw Kasteel van Petegem-aan-de-Schelde)	Wortegem-Petegem		
Poeke Castle (Kasteel van Poeke)	Poeke		
Puttenhove Castle (Kasteel Puttenhove)	Sint-Denijs-Westrem		
Puyenbroek Castle (Kasteel Puyenbroek)	Wachtebeke		
Regelsbrugge Castle (Kasteel van Regelsbrugge)	Aalst		
Reijvissche Castle (Kasteel Reijvissche)	Zwijnaarde		
Rezinghe Castle (Kasteel Rezinghe)	Maldegem		
Roborst Castle (Kasteel van Roborst)	Roborst		
De Rozerie Castle (Kasteel De Rozerie)	Aalst		
Ronse Castle (Kasteel van Ronse)	Ronse		
De Roode Poort Castle (Kasteel de Roode Poort)	Lovendegem		
Roos Castle (Kasteel Roos)	Waasmunster		
De Rozerie Castle (Kasteel De Rozerie)	Aalst		
Ruffo de Bonneval Castle (Kasteel Ruffo de Bonneval)	Nokere		
Hof ter Saksen Castle (Kasteel Hof ter Saksen)	Beveren-Waas		
Schelderode Castle (Kasteel van Schelderode)	Schelderode		
Scheldevelde Castle (Kasteel Scheldevelde)	De Pinte		
Schaubroek Castle (Kasteel Schaubroek)	Vinderhoute		
Slotendries Castle (Kasteel Slotendries)	Oostakker		
Smissebroeck Castle (Kasteel Smissebroeck)	Oosterzele		
Sombeke Castle (Kasteel van Sombeke)	Waasmunster		
Castle Stas de Richelle (Kasteel Stas de Richelle)	Heusden		
Succa Castle (Kasteel Succa)	Destelbergen		
Tieghem de Ten Berghe Castle (Kasteel van Tieghem de Ten Berghe)	Mariakerke		
Ten Velde Castle (Kasteel Ten Velde)	Vinderhoute		
Goed Ten Velde	Lovendegem		
Ten Velde Castle (Kasteel Ten Velde)	Merendree		
Ter Beken Castle (Kasteel Ter Beken)	Mariakerke		
Viteux Castle (Kasteel Viteux)	De Pinte		
Voane Castle (Kasteel Viane)	Geraardsbergen		
Voorde Castle (Kasteel van Voorde)	Voorde		
Het Vurstje Castle (Kasteel het Vurstje)	Evergem		
Walburg Castle (Kasteel Walburg)	Sint-Niklaas		
Ter Wallen Castle (Kasteel Ter Wallen)	Merendree		
Wannegem-Lede Castle (Kasteel van Wannegem-Lede)	Wannegem-Lede		
Wedergrate Castle (Kasteel Van Wedergrate)	Ninove		
Welden Castle (Kasteel van Welden)	Zevergem		
Ter Weiden Castle (Kasteel Ter Weiden)	Evergem		
Wippelgem Castle (Kasteel van Wippelgem)	Wippelgem		
Wissekerke Castle (Kasteel Wissekerke)	Bazel		
Wit Kasteel	Vinderhoute		

=== Flemish Brabant ===
Name	Location	Note	Image
Arenberg Castle (Kasteel van Arenberg)	Heverlee		
Ter Balken Castle (Kasteel Ter Balken)	Kampenhout		
Beaulieu Castle (Kasteel Beaulieu)	Machelen		
Beersel Castle (Kasteel van Beersel)	Beersel	medieval castle	
Bouchout Castle (Kasteel van Bouchout)	Meise	medieval castle	
Buizingen Castle (Kasteel van Buizingen)	Buizingen		
Castelhof Castle (Kasteel Castelhof)	Sint-Martens-Bodegem		
Cleerbeek Castle (Kasteel van Cleerbeek)	Sint-Joris-Winge		
Diependael Castle (Kasteel Diependael)	Elewijt		
Coloma Castle (Kasteel van Coloma)	Sint-Pieters-Leeuw		
Diepensteyn Castle (Kasteel Diepensteyn)	Steenhuffel		
Dilbeek Castle (Kasteel van Dilbeek)	Dilbeek		
de Eiken Castle (Kasteel de Eiken)	Humbeek		
de Kerckhove d'Exaerde Castle (Kasteel de Kerckhove d'Exaerde)	Steenokkerzeel		
Gaasbeek Castle (Kasteel van Gaasbeek)	Gaasbeek		
Gravenhof Castle (Kasteel Gravenhof)	Dworp		
Groeneveld Castle (Kasteel Groeneveld)	Grimbergen		
Groenhoven Castle (Kasteel Groenhoven)	Malderen		
Groot-Bijgaarden Castle (Kasteel van Groot-Bijgaarden)	Groot-Bijgaarden		
Ham Castle, Belgium (Kasteel van Ham)	Steenokkerzeel		
Heerlijckyt van Elsmeren	Geetbets		
Heetvelde Castle (Kasteel van Heetvelde)	Gooik		
Hoogpoort Castle (Kasteel Hoogpoort)	Asse		
Horst Castle (Kasteel van Horst)	Sint-Pieters-Rode	medieval castle	
Huldenberg Castle (Kasteel van Huldenberg)	Huldenberg		
Huizingen Castle (Kasteel van Huizingen)	Beersel		
Humbeek Castle (Kasteel van Humbeek)	Humbeek		
Imde Castle (Kasteel van Imde)	Meise		
Isque Castle (Kasteel Isque)	Overijse		
Kruikenburg Castle (Kasteel Kruikenburg)	Ternat		
Lint Castle (Lintkasteel)	Grimbergen		
Leefdaal Castle (Kasteel van Leefdaal)	Leefdaal		
Loonbeek Castle (Kasteel van Loonbeek)	Loonbeek		
Marnix Castle (Kasteel de Marnix)	Overijse		
Castle de Man (Kasteel de Man)	Hoeilaart		
Margapavilioen	Diegem		
Castle de Maurissens (Kasteel de Maurissens)	Lubbeek		
Castle de Merode (Kasteel de Merode)	Everberg		
De la Motte Castle (Kasteel de la Motte)	Sint-Ulriks-Kapelle		
Neerijse Castle (Kasteel van Neerijse)	Huldenberg		
Nieuwermolen Castle (Kasteel Nieuwermolen)	Sint-Ulriks-Kapelle		
Nieuwland Castle (Kasteel Nieuwland)	Aarschot		
Oorbeek Castle (Kasteel van Oorbeek)	Oorbeek		
D'Overschie Castle (Kasteel d'Overschie)	Grimbergen		
Pellenberg Castle (Kasteel Pellenberg)	Machelen		
Petegem Castle (Kasteel van Petegem)	Wortegem-Petegem		
Prinsenkasteel	Grimbergen		
Quirini Castle (Landhuis de Quirini)	Hoeilaart		
Rampelberg Castle (Kasteel Rampelberg)	Asse		
Rattendaal Castle (Kasteel Rattendaal)	Sint-Pieters-Leeuw		
Ribeaucourt Castle (Kasteel de Ribeaucourt)	Perk		
Rivieren Castle (Kasteel van Rivieren)	Aarschot		
Red Castle (Rood Kasteel)	Linden		
Schiplaken Castle (Kasteel van Schiplaken)	Boortmeerbeek		
Schoonhoven Castle (Kasteel van Schoonhoven)	Aarschot		
New Sint-Agatha-Rode Castle (Nieuwe Kasteel van Sint-Agatha-Rode)	Sint-Agatha-Rode		
Hof te Sittaert	Asse		
Het Steen	Elewijt		
Steenhault Castle (Kasteel van Steenhault)	Vollezele		
Ter Meeren Castle (Kasteel Ter Meeren)	Sterrebeek		
Troostenberg Castle (Kasteel van Troostenberg)	Houwaart		
De Viron Castle (Kasteel de Viron)	Dilbeek		
Waalborre Castle (Kasteel Waalborre)	Asse		
Waarbeek Castle (Kasteel van Waarbeek)	Asse		
Walfergem Castle (Kasteel van Walfergem) or Hof te Huseghem	Asse		

=== Limburg province ===
Name	Location	Note	Image
Alden Biesen Castle (Landcommanderij Alden Biesen)	Rijkhoven		
Altembrouck Castle (Kasteel Altembrouck)	's-Gravenvoeren		
Aspremont-Lynden Castle (Kasteel d'Aspremont-Lynden)	Oud-Rekem		
Bellevue Castle (Kasteel Bellevue)	Gors-Opleeuw		
Bergkelder Castle (Burcht van Bergkelder)	Rotem, Dilsen-Stokkem		
Bethania Castle (Bethaniakasteel)	Hoeselt		
Betho Castle (Kasteel Betho)	Tongeren		
Binderveld Castle (Kasteel van Binderveld)	Binderveld		
Blekkom Castle (Kasteel van Blekkom)	Loksbergen		
Bommershoven Castle (Kasteel Bommershoven)	Bommershoven		
Borghoven Castle (Kasteel Borghoven)	Piringen		
Borgitter Castle (Kasteel Borgitter)	Kessenich		
De Borman Castle (Kasteel de Borman)	Bree		
Kasteel de Brouckmans	Hoeselt		
Brustem Castle (Kasteel Brustem)	Brustem		
Brustem Tower (De Torenruïne van Brustem Tower)	Brustem		
De Burg Castle (Kasteel De Burg)	Lummen		
Burghof Castle (Kasteel Burghof)	Hoeselt		
Carolinaberg Castle (Burchtruine van Carolinaberg)	Stokkem		
De Clee Castle (Kasteel de Clee)	Kuttekoven		
Kasteel De Commanderij	Sint-Pieters-Voeren		
Daalbroek Castle (Kasteel Daalbroek)	Rekem		
De Motte Castle (Kasteel De Motte)	Groot-Gelmen		
Dessener Castle (Kasteel Dessener)	Wintershoven		
Diepenbeek Castle (Kasteel van Diepenbeek)	Diepenbeek		
Ter Dolen Castle (Kasteel Ter Dolen)	Helchteren		
De Donnea Castle (Kasteel de Donnea)	Guigoven		
Donnea Castle (Kasteel van Donnea)	Veulen		
Duras Castle (Kasteel Duras)	Duras, Sint-Truiden		
Edelhof Castle (Kasteel Edelhof)	Munsterbilzen		
Engelhof Castle (Kasteel Engelhof)	Houthalen		
Fauconval Castle (Kasteel de Fauconval)	Kortessem		
De Fonteinhof	Gotem		
Gasterbos Castle (Kasteel Gasterbos)	Schulen		
Genebroek Castle (Jachtslot Genebroek)	Achel		
Wijnkasteel Genoels Elderen	Genoelselderen		
De Geuzentempel Castle (Kasteel de Geuzentempel)	Alken		
Gingelom Castle (Kasteel Gingelom)	Gingelom		
Gors Castle (Kasteel van Gors)	Gors-Opleeuw		
Groenendaal Castle (Kasteel Groenendaal)	Waltwilder		
Groot Peteren Castle (Kasteel Groot Peteren)	Alken		
Gruitrode Commandery (Commanderij van Gruitrode)	Gruitrode		
Halbeek Castle (Kasteel van Halbeek)	Herk-de-Stad		
Hamal Castle (Kasteel Hamal)	Rutten, Tongeren		
Het Hamel Castle (Kasteel Het Hamel)	Lummen		
Hamont Castle (Kasteel van Hamont)	Herk-de-Stad		
Hasselbrouck Castle (Kasteel van Hasselbroek)	Hasselbroek, Jeuk		
Heers Castle (Kasteel van Heers)	Heers		
Hex Castle (Kasteel van Heks)	Heks		
Henegouw Castle (Kasteel Henegouw)	Hasselt		
's Herenelderen Castle (Kasteel van 's Herenelderen, Kasteel van Renesse)	's Herenelderen		
Heurne Castle (Kasteel van Heurne)	Vechmaal		
Hocht Castle (Kasteel van Hocht), the former Hocht Abbey	Lanaken		
Hoepertingen Castle (Kasteel van Hoepertingen)	Hoepertingen		
Hoof Castle (Kasteel de Hoof)	Teuven		
Hoogveld Castle (Kasteel Hoogveld)	Vliermaal		
Hulsberg Castle (Kasteel Hulsberg)	Borgloon		
Jongenbos Castle (Kasteel Jongenbos)	Vliermaalroot		
Jonkholtz Castle (Kasteel Jonkholtz)	Hoelbeek		
De Kapelhof	Rekem		
Kaulille Castle (Kasteel Kaulille)	Kaulille		
Keienheuvel Castle (Kasteel Keienheuvel)	Klein-Gelmen		
Kerkom Castle (Kasteel van Kerkom)	Kerkom-bij-Sint-Truiden		
Kewith Castle (Kasteel Kewith)	Lanaken		
De Klee	Borgloon		
Kolmont Castle (Burchtruïne van Kolmont)	Overrepen		
Kolmont Castle (Kasteel van Kolmont)	Overrepen		
Kortenbos Castle (Kasteel van Kortenbos)	Kortenbos		
Lagendal, country house (Kasteel Lagendal)	Lummen		
Landwijk Castle (Kasteel van Landwijk)	Donk, Herk-de-Stad		
Leva Castle (Kasteel Leva)	Alken		
Litzberg Castle (Kasteel Litzberg)	Lanklaar		
Loon Castle (Burcht van Loon)	Borgloon		
Loye Castle (Kasteel van Loye)	Lummen		
Kasteel Luciebos	Houthalen		
Magis Castle (Kasteel Magis)	Sint-Pieters-Voeren		
De Méan Castle (Kasteelhoeve de Méan)	Zichen-Zussen-Bolder		
Meeuwen-Gruitrode Castle	Meeuwen-Gruitrode		
Meldert Castle (Waterburcht van Meldert)	Meldert		
Melveren Castle (Kasteel van Melveren)	Sint-Truiden		
de Menten de Horne Castle (Kasteel de Menten de Horne)	Sint-Truiden		
Meylandt Castle (Kasteel Meylandt)	Heusden		
Millen Castle (Waterburcht Millen)	Millen, Riemst		
Mombeek Castle (Kasteel van Mombeek)	Hasselt		
Ter Mottenhof Castle (Kasteel Ter Mottenhof)	Dilsen		
Nieuwenhoven Castle (Kasteel van Nieuwenhoven)	Sint-Truiden		
Nieuwerkerken Castle (Kasteel van Nieuwerkerken)	Nieuwerkerken		
Nonnenmielen Castle (Kasteel van Nonnenmielen)	Sint-Truiden		
Obbeek Castle (Kasteel van Obbeek)	Heusden		
Ommerstein Castle (Kasteel Ommerstein)	Rotem, Dilsen-Stokkem		
Opleeuw Castle (Kasteel Opleeuw)	Gors-Opleeuw		
Obsinnich Castle (Kasteel van Obsinnich)	Remersdaal		
Ordingen Castle (Kasteel van Ordingen)	Ordingen		
Ottegraven Castle (Kasteel van Ottegraven)	's Gravenvoeren, Voeren		
Peten Castle (Kasteel Peten)	Velm		
De Pierpont Castle (Kasteel de Pierpont)	Herk-de-Stad		
Sint-Pietersheim Castle (Kasteel Sint-Pietersheim) and the ruins of the Merode Castle (Merodekasteel)	Lanaken		
Prinsenhof Castle (Kasteel Het Prinsenhof)	Kuringen		
Printhagen Castle (Kasteel Printhagen)	Kortessem		
Quanonen Castle (Kasteel Quanonen)	Koersel		
Rentmeesterij van Alden Biesen	Diepenbeek		
Repen Castle (Kasteel van Repen)	Neerrepen		
Ridderborn Castle (Kasteel Ridderborn)	Vliermaalroot		
Rijkel Castle (Kasteel van Rijkel)	Rijkel		
Rodenpoel Castle (Kasteel Rodenpoel)	Alken		
Het Rood Kasteel	Guigoven		
Rooi Castle (Kasteel van Rooi)	Neerrepen		
Rootsaert Castle (Kasteel Rootsaert)	Alken		
Rosmeulen Castle (Kasteel Rosmeulen)	Nerem		
Rullingen Castle (Kasteel van Rullingen)	Kuttekoven		
Runkelen Castle (Kasteel Runkelen)	Runkelen		
Schalkhoven Castle (Kasteel van Schalkhoven)	Schalkhoven		
Schans Castle (Kasteel de Schans)	Opoeteren		
Scherpenberg Castle (Kasteel Scherpenberg)	Nerem		
Schoonbeek Castle (Waterkasteel van Schoonbeek)	Beverst		
Kasteel van Sinnich	Teuven		
Saint-Peters-Horne Castle (Kasteel van Sint-Pieters-Horne)	Vechmaal		
Sint Pietersvoeren Castle (Kasteel Sint Pietersvoeren)	Sint-Pieters-Voeren		
Sipernau Castle (Kasteel Sipernau)	Elen, Dilsen-Stokkem		
Stevoort Castle (Het Waterkasteel van Stevoort)	Stevoort		
Terbiest Castle (Kasteel van Terbiest)	Sint-Truiden		
Terhoven Castle (Kasteel Terhoven)	Bommershoven		
Terkoest Castle (Kasteel d'Erckenteel Terkoest)	Alken		
Terlaemen Castle (Kasteel Terlaemen)	Bolderberg		
De Termottenhof	Dilsen		
Trockaert Castle (Kasteel Trockaert)	Ulbeek		
Veulen Castle (Kasteel van Veulen)	Heers		
Vilain XIII Castle (Kasteel Vilain XIIII)	Leut		
Vogelsanck Castle (Kasteel Vogelsanck)	Zolder		
Weyer Castle (Kasteel van Weyer)	Wijer		
Widooie Castle (Kasteel Widooie)	Widooie		
Wimmertingen Castle (Kasteel van Wimmertingen)	Wimmertingen		
Wit Kasteel	Kerkom		
Wurfeld Castle (Kasteel van Wurfeld)	Wurfeld		
Zangerheide Castle (Kasteel Zangerheide)	Eigenbilzen		
Zinnich Castle (Kasteel van Zinnich)	Teuven		

=== West Flanders ===
Name	Location	Note	Image
D'Aertrycke Castle (Kasteel d'Aertrycke)	Torhout		
Ardooie Castle (Kasteel van Ardooie or Kasteel de Jonghe d'Ardoye)	Ardooie		
Beauvoorde Castle (Kasteel Beauvoorde)	Wulveringem		
Beisbroek Castle (Kasteel Beisbroek)	Sint-Andries		
Castle Ten Berghe (Kasteel Ten Berghe)	Bruges		
Kasteel De Blankaart	Diksmuide		
Het Blauwhuis Castle (Kasteel Het Blauwhuis)	Wingene		
Het Blauwhuis Castle (Kasteel Het Blauwhuis)	Vinkem		
Blauw Huis Castle (Kasteel Blauw Huis)	Izegem		
Blauwe Torre Castle (Kasteel Blauwe Torre)	Varsenare		
De Boeverie Castle (Kasteel de Boeverie)	Varsenare		
Ter Borght Castle (Kasteel Ter Borght)	Meulebeke		
Bulskamp Castle (Kasteel Bulskamp)	Beernem		
Reigerlo Castle (Kasteel Reigerlo)	Beernem		
Hontzocht Castle (Kasteel Hontzocht)	Beernem		
Hulstlo Castle (Kasteel Hulstlo)	Beernem		
Bloemendale Castle (Kasteel Bloemendale)	Beernem		
Ten Torre Castle (Kasteel Ten Torre)	Beernem		
De Wapenaer Castle (Kasteel De Wapenaer)	Beernem		
De Lanier Castle (Kasteel de Lanier)	Beernem		
De Vijvers Castle (Kasteel De Vijvers)	Beernem		
Beukenhof Vichte	Vichte		
Bossuit Castle (Kasteel van Bossuit)	Bossuit		
Casier Castle (Kasteel Casier)	Waregem		
Cleyhem Castle (Kasteel Cleyhem)	Zuienkerke		
Diesvelt Castle	Otegem		
Doolbos Castle	Eernegem		
Elverdinge Castle	Elverdinge		
Elzenwalle Castle	Voormezele		
de la Faille Castle	Bruges		
Gaver Castle	Deerlijk		
Gruuthuse	Oostkamp		
De Hernieuwenburg	Wielsbeke		
't Hooghe Castle	Kortrijk		
Hoogveld Castle (Kasteel Hoogveld)	Veldegem		
Ingelmunster Castle (Kasteel van Ingelmunster)	Ingelmunster		
Kasteel Kevergem	Assebroek		
Drie Koningen Castle ("Three Kings Castle"); Kasteel Drie Koningen	Beernem		
Bourgondic Kortrijk Castle	Kortrijk		
Koude Keuken Castle	Sint-Andries		
Lantonnois de Rode Castle	Eernegem		
Loppem Castle (Kasteel van Loppem)	Loppem		
Ter Lucht Castle	Sint-Andries		
De Maere Castle (Kasteel de Maere)	Aartrijke		
Male Castle (Kasteel van Male or Het Grafelijk Slot van Male)	Sint-Kruis		
Santa Maria Castle (Kasteel Santa Maria)	Varsenare		
Marke Castle (Kasteel van Marke)	Marke		
Minnewater Castle (Kasteel Minnewater)	Bruges		
Moere Le bon Séjour Castle	Moere		
Moerkerke Castle (Kasteel van Moerkerke)	Moerkerke		
Moorsele Castle (Waterkasteel van Moorsele)	Moorsele		
Norenburg Castle	Bruges		
Ooigem Castle (Kasteel van Ooigem)	Ooigem		
Oostkerke Castle (Kasteel van Oostkerke)	Oostkerke (Damme)		
Pecsteen Castle	Ruddervoorde		
Ten Poele Castle	Bruges		
Potegem Castle (Kasteel van Potegem)	Waregem		
Proven Castle (Hof van Proven)	Varsenare		
Ravenhof Castle (Torhout)	Torhout		
Rooigem Castle (Kasteel van Rooigem)	Sint-Kruis		
Rosendahl Castle (Kasteel Rosendahl)	Ichtegem		
Rumbeke Castle (Kasteel van Rumbeke)	Rumbeke		
Ryckevelde Castle (Kasteel van Ryckevelde)	Assebroek		
Spiere Castle (Kasteel van Spiere)	Spiere		
Kasteel van Staden	Staden		
Château de Surmont	Kortrijk		
Tillegem Castle (Kasteel van Tillegem)	Sint-Michiels		
De Torelen Castle (Kasteel De Torelen)	Vinkem		
Ten Torre Castle (Kasteel Ten Torre)	Oedelem		
Tudor Castle (Kasteel Tudor)	Sint-Andries		
Vichte Old Castle	Vichte		
Vilain Castle	Reninge		
Ter Waere Castle (Kasteel Ter Waere)	Gistel		
Wakken Castle (Kasteel van Wakken)	Wakken		
Warande Castle (Kasteel de Warande)	Kemmel		
Wielsbeke Castle	Wielsbeke		
Wijnendale Castle (Kasteel van Wijnendale)	Torhout		
Zevekote Castle	Assebroek		

== Wallonia ==
=== Hainaut province ===
Name	Location	Note	Image
Acoz Castle	Acoz, Gerpinnes		
Attre Castle	Attre, Brugelette		
Antoing Castle	Antoing		
Anvaing Castle	Anvaing, Frasnes-lez-Anvaing		
Château des Baudry	Roisin		
Beaulieu Castle	Havré		
Beauregard Castle (Froyennes)	Tournai		
Château de Belœil	Belœil		
La Berlière Castle	Ath		
Saint-Bernard Tower	Brugelette		
Biez Castle	Péruwelz		
Château de Bitremont	Bury, Péruwelz		
Bon Revoir Castle	Ath		
Boussu Castle	Boussu		
Burbant Castle	Ath		
Cartier Castle	Marchienne-au-Pont		
Casteau Castle	Casteau		
La Catoire Castle	Leuze-en-Hainaut		
Castle of the counts of Chastel	Antoing		
Château de Chimay	Chimay		
Château des Comtes	Mouscron		
Château-ferme de Cour-sur-Heure (Note: "The French word for castle is "château", be it for an old medieval fortress ("château fort") or a residential castle. The term "château-ferme" means that a medieval castle has been transformed into a farm..."(Eupedia.com 2014).)	Ham-sur-Heure-Nalinnes		
Château-ferme Curgies	Antoing		
Écaussinnes-Lalaing Castle	Écaussinnes	château fort	
Empain Castle	Enghien		
Château de l'Ernelle	Monceau-sur-Sambre		
Castle of l'Estriverie	Lessines		
Farciennes Castle	Farciennes		
Château de Feluy	Feluy, Seneffe		
Château de la Follie	Écaussinnes		
Fontaine-l'Évêque Castle	Fontaine-l'Évêque		
Fosteau Castle	Leers-et-Fosteau, Thuin	château fort	
Château de Forchies-la-Marche	Forchies-la-Marche, Fontaine-l'Évêque		
Château de Ghlin	Ghlin		
Château de Gougnies	Gougnies, Gerpinnes		
Tour de Gosselies	Gosselies		
Ham-sur-Heure Castle	Ham-sur-Heure		
Havré Castle	Havré	château fort	
Château d'Herchies or Château des comtes d'Egmont	Herchies, Jurbise		
Château d'Imbrechies	Monceau-Imbrechies, Momignies		
Château d'Irchonwelz	Irchonwelz, Ath		
Chateau du Jardin	Chièvres		
Chateau du Jardinde Lassus	Blandain, Tournai		
Château de Louvignies	Soignies		
Château Malaise	Huissignies, Honnelles		
Château de Mariemont	Morlanwelz		
Château de Monceau-sur-Sambre	Monceau-sur-Sambre		
Château de Montignies-sur-Roc	Montignies-sur-Roc		
Château de Moulbaix	Ath		
Château d'Ossogne	Thuillies, Thuin		
Château du Parc	Thieusies		
Château de la Poterie	Frameries		
Château de Prelle	Manage		
Château de Presles	Presles, Aiseau-Presles		
Château-ferme de Quirini	Fleurus		
Le Rœulx Castle, also known as the Château des Princes de Croÿ	Le Rœulx		
Château-ferme de Rampemont	Fayt-le-Franc, Honnelles	château fort	
Château de Rianwelz	Courcelles		
Château de la Rocq	Arquennes, Seneffe		
La Royère Castle	Néchin, Estaimpuis		
Sars-la-Bruyère Castle	Frameries		
Château de Seneffe	Seneffe		
Solre-sur-Sambre Castle	Solre-sur-Sambre, Erquelinnes		
Château-ferme de Taravisée	Les Bons Villers		
Templeuve Castle	Templeuve, Tournai		
Château de Thoricourt	Thoricourt, Silly		
Château de Thuillies	Thuillies, Thuin		
Château de Thieusies	Thieusies		
Trazegnies Castle	Trazegnies, Courcelles		
Château de Vaulx	Tournai		
Château Villegas	Chaussée-Notre-Dame-Louvignies		
Château de Wanfercée	Fleurus		

=== Liège province ===
Name	Location	Note	Image
Château d'Abée	Abée, Tinlot		
Château d'Ahin	Ben-Ahin, Huy		
Château d'Aigremont	Flémalle		
Vieux Château d'Aineffe	Aineffe, Faimes		
Château d'Alensberg	Moresnet, Plombières		
Château d’Alsa	Spa		
Château d'Altena	Saint-Jean-Sart, Aubel		
Château d'Amâs	Ocquier, Clavier		
Château d'Amblève	Aywaille		
Château d'Amcômont	Amcomont, Lierneux		
Haus Amstenrath	Eynatten, Raeren		
Château d'Andrimont	Andrimont, Dison		
Château-Ferme d'Angoxhe	Rotheux-Rimière, Neupré		
Château Antoine	Jemeppe-sur-Meuse, Seraing		
Avouerie de Anthisnes	Anthisnes		
Château d'Argenteau	Liège		
Château-ferme d'Attines	Engis		
Château d'Avin	Avin, Hannut		
Château d'Avionpuits	Esneux		
Château d'Awan	Awan, Aywaille		
Château de Baelen	Welkenraedt		
Château de Bagatelle	Vyle-et-Tharoul, Marchin		
Château de Balmoral (B)	Sart-lez-Spa, Jalhay		
Château de Banneux	Fraipont, Trooz		
Château de Barisart	Spa		
Château de Baugnée	Nandrin		
Château de Beaufort	Ben-Ahin, Huy		
Château de Beaumont	Sclessin, Liège		
Château de Beemont	Béemont, Ouffet		
Château Béemont	Fraineux, Nandrin		
Château de Bellaire-La Motte	Saive, Blegny		
Château Belle-Maison	Marchin		
Château de Bempt	Moresnet, Plombières		
Haus Bergscheid	Raeren		
Château de Berlieren	Hombourg, Plombières		
Château de Bernalmont	Liège		
Prieuré de Bertrée	Bertrée, Hannut		
Château de Beusdael	Plombières		
Château Biron	Comblain-la-Tour, Hamoir		
Château Blanc	Couthuin, Héron		
Château Blanc	Lamalle, Wanze		
Château Blanc	Mortier, Blegny		
Château de Blehen	Blehen, Hannut		
Château Bleu	Trooz, Vesder		
Château de Boëlhe	Boëlhe, Geer		
Château de Boirs	Boirs, Bassenge		
Ferme-château de Bois-Borsu	Bois-et-Borsu, Clavier		
Château de Bolland	Herve (Bolland)		
Château de Bonne-Espérance	Huy (Tihange)		
De Borcht	Dalhem		
Château de Borset	Vaux-et-Borset, Villers-le-Bouillet		
Château-ferme de Borsu	Verlaine		
Château de Bracht	Bracht, Burg-Reuland		
Château de Braives	Braives		
Château de Brialmont	Tilff, Esneux		
Château de Broich	Montzen, Plombières		
Château Brunsode	Tilff, Esneux		
Château des Bruyères	Liège, Liège		
Château de Burdinne	Burdinne, Burdinne		
Reuland Castle	Burg-Reuland		
Château de Chaineux	Chaineux, Herve		
Château de Chaityfontaine	Pepinster		
Château de Chanxhe	Chanxhe, Sprimont		
Château-ferme de la Chapelle	Anthisnes		
Fort de la Chartreuse	Liège		
Château de Chevron	Chevron, Stoumont		
Château de Chokier	Chokier		
Château Cockerill	Seraing		
Château Collée	Roclenge-sur-Geer, Bassenge		
Château Colonster	Liège		
Château Cortils	Mortier, Blegny		
Château Coulon	Bas-Oha, Wanze		
Château de Courtejoie	Jemeppe-sur-Meuse, Seraing		
Château de Cras-Avernas	Cras-Avernas, Hannut		
Château Crawhez	Thimister-Clermont		
Château de Crèvecœur	Battice, Herve		
Château de la Croix-Saint-Hubert	Ivoz-Ramet, Flémalle		
Château fort de Dalhem	Dalhem, Dalhem		
Château de Dieupart	Aywaille		
Château de Donceel	Donceel		
Château Dorman	Ensival, Verviers		
Château Dossin	Hermalle-sous-Argenteau, Oupeye		
Château Dupont	Wandre, Liège		
Château d'Emblève	Aywaille		
Château de l'Enclos	Ligney, Geer		
Château d'Englebermont	Rotheux-Rimière, Neupré		
Château d'Envoz	Couthuin, Héron		
Château Eulenburg	Moresnet, Plombières		
Burg Eyneburg	Kelmis		
Château Fabri	Seny, Tinlot		
Château Le Facqueval	Vierset-Barse, Modave		
Château de Fagne Maron	La Reid, Theux		
Château de Fallais	Fallais, Braives	château fort	
Château de Famelette	Huccorgne, Wanze		
Fanson Castle	Xhoris Ferrières		
Château-ferme du Faweux	Ernonheid, Aywaille		
Château de Fayenbois	Jupille-sur-Meuse		
Château de Fays	Fays, Theux		
La Fenderie	Trooz		
Château de Ferot	Ferrières, Belgium		
Château de Filanneux	Ensival, Spa, Belgium		
Château de la Petite Flémalle	Flémalle		
Château de Fléron	Ben-Ahin, Huy		
Château de Florzé	Florzé, Sprimont		
Château de Fond L'Evêque	Tihange, Huy		
Château de Fontaine	Fontaine, Grâce-Hollogne		
Château Forêt	Trooz		
Château de Fosseroule	Huccorgne, Wanze		
Château de la Fraineuse	Nivezé, Spa, Belgium		
Château de Fraineux	Yernée-Fraineux, Nandrin		
Château de Franchimont	Theux	château fort	
Château Francotte	Dalhem		
Maison de Francquen	Liège		
Château de Froidcourt	Stoumont		
Château de Fumal	Braives		
Château Le Fy	Esneux		
Château des Genêts	Blieberg, Plombières		
Château de Ghorez	Donceel		
Château de Goé	Goé, Limbourg		
Château-ferme des Gofes	Pailhe, Clavier		
Château de Gomzé	Gomzé-Andoumont, Sprimont		
Château de Goreux	Voroux-Goreux, Fexhe-le-Haut-Clocher		
Château-ferme de la Gotte	Saint-Séverin-en-Condroz, Nandrin		
Château de Grand Bru	Sprimont		
Château ferme Grandgagnage	Vaux-et-Bordet, Villers-le-Bouillet		
Château de Grimonster	Grimonster, Ferrières		
Château de Halledet	Clermont-sous-Huy, Engis		
Château de Halleur	Stembert, Verviers		
Maison forte de Haneffe	Haneffe, Donceel		
Château de Hannêche	Hannêche, Burdinne		
Harzé Castle	Harzé, Aywaille		
Château de Hautepenne	Flémalle		
Château de Hautregard	La Reid, Theux		
Château Heptia	Ville-en-Hesbaye, Theux		
Château de Hermalle-sous-Huy	Hermalle-sous-Huy, Engis		
Château d'Herzée	Blehen, Hannut		
Château de Heuseux	Cerexhe-Heuseux, Soumagne		
Château d'Himbe	Himbe, Ouffet		
Château de Hodbomont	Hodbomont, Theux		
Château de Hody	Hody, Anthisnes		
Château de Hoegaerden	Esneux		
Citadel de Huy	Huy		
Château de Hollogne	Hollogne-aux-Pierre, Grâce-Hollogne		
Old castle of de Hollogne-sur-Geer	Hollogne-sur-Geer, Geer		
Château-ferme de Hombroux	Ans		
Château de Horion	Horion, Grâce-Hollogne		
Château de l'Horloge	Wanze		
Château d'Houchenée	Tavier, Anthisnes		
Château-ferme van Housse	Bas-Oha, Blegny		
Château de Hoyoux	Hoyoux, Clavier		
Château d'Inzegottes	Filot, Hamoir		
Jehay-Bodegnée Castle	Amay		
Château du Joncmesnil	Lambermont, Verviers		
Château Knoppenburg	Raeren		
Château-Ferme Là-Bas	Paifve, Juprelle		
Château de Lamalle	Bas-Oha, Wanze		
Lassus Castle	Hamoir		
Château du Lavaux	Esneux		
Manoir de Lébioles	Creppe, Spa, Belgium		
Château de Lexhy	Lexhy, Grâce-Hollogne		
Liberme Castle	Eupen		
Donjon de Limont	Limont, Donceel		
Château de Limont	Donceel		
Château de Lincé	Lincé, Sprimont		
Château de Ferme de Lincent	Lincent		
Château de Logne	Vieuxville, Ferrierès		
Château de Longchamps	Berneau, Dalhem		
Château de Longchamps or Château de Sélys-Longchamps	Waremme		
Lontzen Castle	Lontzen		
Château de la Louvetrie	Limbourg		
Château Lovinfosse	Seraing		
Château de Magnery	Clermont-sous-Huy, Engis		
Château de Mambaye	Spa, Belgium		
Château Del Marmol	Ensival, Verviers		
Château des Marronniers	Chaineux, Herve		
Château de Marsinne	Couthuin, Héron		
Château Mayette	Liège		
Château des Mazures	Cornesse, Pepinster		
Château Méan	Blégny		
Château de Megarnie	Engis		
Château de Melen	Melen, Soumagne		
Château de Merdorp	Merdorp, Hannut		
Château de Modave	Modave		
Château de Moha	Wanze	château fort	
Château de Monceau	Méry, Esneux		
Château de Mons	Mons-lez-Liège, Flémalle		
Château de Montglyon	Argenteau, Visé		
Château de Montjardin	Remouchamps, Aywaille		
Château Montplaisir	Spa, Belgium		
Château des Montys	Stavelot		
Haus Möris	Raeren		
Château de la Motte en Gée	Tihange, Huy		
Château de Moxhe	Moxhe, Hannut		
Haus Mützhof	Walhorn, Lontzen		
Château Nagelmackers	Liège		
Château de Naveau	Bra, Lierneux		
Le Neubois	Nivezé, Spa, Belgium		
Château Neufays	Fays, Theux		
Château de Neufcour	Beyne-Heusay		
Château de Neuville	Tihange		
Château de Neuville-en-Condroz	Neuville-en-Condroz, Neupré		
Château Nihoul	Hannuit		
Schloss Oberhausen	Oberhausen, Burg-Reuland		
Château de Ochain	Clavier		
Château d'Odeigne	Odeigne, Ouffet		
Château d'Odeur	Odeur, Crisnée		
Manoir de Omal	Omal, Geer		
Château d'Ordange	Jemeppe-sur-Meuse, Seraing		
Haus Van Orley	Burg-Reuland		
Château d'Oteppe	Burdinne		
Château de Othée	Elch, Othée		
Château d'Otrange	Otrange, Orye		
Château d'Otreppe	Aineffe, Faimes		
Château d'Ottomont	Andrimont, Dison		
Château d'Oudoumont	Verlaine		
Château de Ouffet	Huy		
Château d'Ouhar	Anthisnes		
Château de Oulhaye	Saint-Georges-sur-Meuse		
Château de Oultremont	Villers-le-Bouillet		
Château d'Oupeye	Oupeye		
Château de l'Ourlaine	Jevoumont, Theux		
Château de Pailhe	Pailhe, Clavier		
Château de Pair	Pair, Clavier		
Château Palmers	Glons, Bassenge		
Château Pecsteen	Saives, Faimes		
Château Peltzer	Verviers		
Château Peralta	Liège		
Philippenhaus	Kettenis, Eupen		
Château Piedboeuf	Jupille-sur-Meuse, Liège		
Château-ferme de Pitet	Pitet, Braives		
Château de Plainevaux	Plainevaux, Neupré		
Château Polet	Fexhe-Slins, Juprelle		
Château de Ponthoz	Ponthoz, Clavier		
Château-ferme van Pontpierre-Méan	Neufchâteau, Dalhem		
Château Poswick	Dolhain, Limbourg		
Ancien Château de Potesta	Envoz, Héron		
Château Prayon	Trooz		
Château Presseux	Liège		
Prince-Bishops' Palace (Liège)	Liège		
Château des Quatre Tourettes	Saint-Léonard, Liège		
Raaf Tower	Eynatten, Raeren		
Raeren Castle	Raeren		
Haus Raeren	Raeren		
Château de Ramelot	Ramelot, Tinlot		
Château de Ramet	Flémalle		
Château de Ramioul	Ivoz-Ramet, Flémalle		
Château de Rechain	Petit-Rechain, Verviers		
Château Regout	Neufchâteau, Dalhem		
Reinhardstein Castle	Waimes	château fort	
Château de Renal	Ouffet		
Château de Rennes	Hamoir		
Château du Rivage	Cras-Avernas, Hannut		
Château de Rochée	Lamontzée, Burdinne		
Château des Roches	Trooz		
Château du Rond-Chêne	Esneux		
Château Rorive	Ombret-Rawsa, Amay		
Château Roseraie	Nivezé, Spa, Belgium		
Château Rouge	Bas-Oha, Wanze		
Château Rouge	Herstal		
Château de Rouheid	Heusy, Verviers		
Château de Royseux	Vierset-Barse, Modave		
Château de Ruyff	Henri-Chapelle, Welkenraedt		
Château Sagehomme	Herbiester, Jalhay		
Château de Saint-Fontaine	Saint-Fontaine, Clavier		
Château de Saint-Lambert	Saint-Fontaine, Clavier		
Château de Saint-Nicolas	Saint-Nicolas		
Château de Saint-Vitu	Abée, Tinlot		
Château de Sainval	Tilff, Esneux		
Vieux Château de Saive	Saive, Blegny		
Château-ferme de Saives	Saives, Faimes		
Château Sarolea	Cheratte, Visé		
Château-Ferme du Sart	Ampsin, Amay		
Château du Sart de Marneffe	Marneffe, Burdinne		
Château du Sartay	Embourg, Chaudfontaine		
Château de la Sarte	Tihange, Huy		
Château de la Sauvenière	Huy		
Château Schimper	Moresnet, Plombières		
Château de Sclassin	Wegnez, Pepinster		
Château de Sclessin	Sclessin, Liège		
Château de Seraing	Seraing		
Château de Seraing-le-Château	Verlaine		
Château Snyers	Hannut		
Château Sohan	Pepinster		
Château-ferme van Soheit	Soheit-Tinlot, Tinlot		
Château de Soiron	Soiron, Pepinster		
Château de l'Abbaye de Solières	Ben-Ahin, Huy		
Château Des Sorbiers	Spa		
Château Sous les Haies	Spa, Belgium		
Château de Spirlet	Quarreux, Aywaille		
Stockem Castle	Eupen		
Château de Strée	Strée, Modave		
Streversdorp Castle	Plombières		
Château de Strivay	Strivay, Neupré		
Château de Tancrémont	Pepinster		
Château de Targnon	Targnon, Stoumont		
Château de Tavier	Tavier, Anthisnes		
Chateau du Temple	Wanze		
Château de Terwagne	Terwagne, Clavier		
Thal Castle	Eupen		
Château de Tharoul	Vyle-et-Tharoul, Marchin		
Château des Thermes	Vaux-sous-Chèvremont, Chaudfontaine		
Château de Thisnes	Thisnes, Hannut		
Schloss Thor	Walhorn, Lontzen		
Château-ferme de Thys	Thys, Crisnée		
Château Thysen	Les Waleffes, Faimes		
Château de Tihange	Tihange, Huy		
Château de Tillesse	Abée, Tinlot		
Chateau de Tinlot	Tinlot		
Château de la Tour	Esneux		
Manoir de la Tour	Villers-le-Temple, Nandrin		
Château Tour au Bois	Villers-le-Temple, Nandrin		
Château La Tourelle	Heusy, Verviers		
Château Les Tourelles	Petit-Rechain, Verviers		
Château Les Tourelles	Spa, Belgium		
Château de Trognée	Trognée, Hannut		
Haus Trouet	Eynatten, Raeren		
Château Trumly	Trooz		
Château Ulens	Lincent		
Castel du Val d'Or	Ocquier, Clavier		
Château de La Vaulx-Renard	Monceau, Stoumont		
Tornaco Castle or Château de Vervoz	Vervoz, Clavier		
Chateau de Vieljaeren	Hombourg, Plombières		
Château de Vien	Vien, Anthisnes		
Vierset Castle	Vierset-Barse, Modave		
Vieux Château	Fraiture, Tinlot		
Château du Vieux Fourneau	Hamoir		
Château-ferme de Vieux Waleffe	Vieux-Waleffe, Villers-le-Bouillet		
Château de Vieux-Barse	Vierset-Barse, Modave		
Château de la Vignette	Couthuin, Héron		
Château de Ville	Ferrières, Belgium		
Château de Villers	Bilstain, Limbourg		
Château de Villers-aux-Tours	Villers-aux-Tours, Anthisnes		
Château de Villers-Saint-Siméon	Villers-Saint-Siméon, Juprelle		
Château de Vinalmont Wanze	Vinalmont, Wanze		
Vlattenhaus	Eynatten, Raeren		
Château de Voroux	Voroux-lez-Liers, Juprelle		
Ferme-château de Voroux	Voroux-Goreux, Fexhe-le-Haut-Clocher		
Château Vreuschemen	Membach, Baelen		
Château de Vyle	Vyle-et-Tharoul, Marchin		
Waldenburghaus	Kettenis, Eupen		
Château de Waleffe Saint-Pierre	Les Waleffes		
Schloss Wallerode	Wallerode, Saint-Vith		
Château de Wanne	Wanne, Trois-Ponts		
Château de Wanzoul	Vinalmont, Wanze		
Château de Warfusée	Saint-Georges-sur-Meuse		
Château de Waroux	Alleur, Ans		
Wégimont Castle	Soumagne		
Schloss Gross Weims	Kettenis, Eupen		
Château Winerotte	Neufchâteau, Dalhem		
Château de Wodémont	Dalhem		
Xhos Castle	Tavier, Anthisnes		
Château de Xhygnez	Sprimont		
Château de Yernée	Yernée-Fraineux, Nandrin		

=== Luxembourg province ===
Name	Location	Note	Image
Chateau des Amerois	Bouillon		
Château d'Aye	Aye		
Château de Barnich	Autelbas, Arlon		
Château les Beaux-arts	Rendeux		
Château de Beurthé	Steinbach, Gouvy		
Château de Biourge	Biourge, Bertrix		
Château de Bleid	Bleid, Virton		
Château de Blier	Érezée		
Château de Bomal	Durbuy		
Château Borchamps	Marche-en-Famenne		
Bouillon Castle	Bouillon	château fort	
Château de Casaguy	Bertogne		
Domein de Clémarais	Aubange		
Chateau Cugnon	Bertrix		
Deulin Castle	Fronville, Hotton		
Château de Dohan	Dohan		
Château-Le-Duc	Bouillon		
Château de Durbuy	Durbuy		
Château d'Étalle	Étalle		
Château de Faing	Chiny		
Château Farnières	Vielsalm		
Château-ferme de Fisenne	Érezée		
Château Forge Roussel	Florenville		
Château den Gomery	Virton		
Château de Grand-Halleux	Grand-Halleux, Vielsalm		
Château de Grune	Grune, Nassogne		
Guirsch Castle	Guirsch, Arlon		
Château de Habay-la-Neuve	Habay-la-Neuve, Habay		
Château d'Hassonville	Aye		
Herbeumont Castle	Herbeumont		
Château d'Izier	Izier, Durbuy		
Jemeppe Castle	Hargimont, Marche-en-Famenne	château fort	
Château Laclaireau	Virton		
Château Laide Fagne	Steinbach		
Château de Laittres	Saint-Mard, Virton		
La Roche-en-Ardenne Castle	La Roche-en-Ardenne	château fort	
Kasteel van Latour	Virton		
Laval Castle	Sainte-Ode		
Kasteel van Longchamps	Bertogne		
Château de Losange	Villers-la-Bonne-Eau, Bastogne		
Château de Marcourt	Marcourt, Rendeux		
Château de Messancy	Messancy		
Mirwart Castle	Mirwart, Saint-Hubert		
Château-ferme Monceau	Vaux-sur-Sûre		
Montquintin Castle	Montquintin, Rouvroy		
Château des Moudreux	Cherain, Gouvy		
Château Mohimont	Florenville		
Château Montauban	Virton		
Château-ferme de Noedelange	Aubange		
Château-ferme de Ny	Hotton		
Château d'Orval	Villers-devant-Orval		
Château de Petite-Somme	Septon, Durbuy		
Château de Pinval	Lesse-Redu		
Château de Roumont	Libin		
Château Pont d'Oye	Habay		
Château de Porcheresse	Daverdisse		
Château de Remaux	Libramont-Chevigny		
Château de Rendeux-Bas	Rendeux		
Château de Resteigne	Tellin		
Château des comtes de Salm	Salmchâteau, Vielsalm	ruin	
Château de Signeulx	Musson		
Château de Sohier	Wellin		
Château-ferme de Sterpenich	Sterpenich		
Tavigny Castle	Tavigny, Houffalize		
Château-ferme den Tellin	Tellin		
Chateau d'Ursel	Durbuy		
Château de Villers-Sainte-Gertrude	Durbuy		
Château de Villers-sur-Semois	Étalle		
Castle of Waha	Waha		

=== Namur province ===
Name	Location	Note	Image
Anhaive Castle	Namur		
Annevoie Castle	Anhée		
Ardenne Castle	Houyet		
Château d'Arenberg	Marche-les-Dames, Namur		
Château d'Ave	Ave-et-Auffe, Rochefort		
Château de Balâtre	Jemeppe-sur-Sambre		
Château de Baillonville	Baillonville, Somme-Leuze		
Château de Baronville (Belgium)	Baronville (Belgium), Beauraing		
Château de Barvaux	Barvaux-Condroz, Havelange		
Château de Bayard	Dhuy, Éghezée		
Château de Beauraing	Beauraing		
Château de Bellaire	Haltinne, Gesves		
Château de Bioul	Bioul, Anhée		
Château de Blocqmont	Houx, Yvoir		
Château Bon Baron	Profondeville		
Bonneville Castle	Andenne		
Château de Bormenville	Flostoy, Havelange		
Château-ferm de Bossière	Mettet		
Château de Boussu-en-Fagnes	Boussu-en-Fagne, Couvin		
Château de Buresse	Hamois		
Château de Burmesse	Schaltin, Hamois		
Château de Champion	Emptinne, Hamois		
Château Castel Alne	Barvaux-Condroz, Havelange		
Château de Chérimont	Sclayn, Andenne		
Ciergnon Castle	Ciergnon, Houyet		
Château de Conjoux	Conjoux, Ciney		
Castle of Corroy-le-Château	Corroy-le-Château, Gembloers	château fort	
Château-ferme de Courrière	Courrière		
Crèvecœur Castle	Bouvignes-sur-Meuse	château fort	
Crupet Castle	Crupet	château fort	
Dave Castle	Dave, Namur		
Château de Doyon	Havelange		
Château d'Enhaive	Jambes		
Château d'Évrehailles	Évrehailles, Yvoir		
Fagnolle Castle	Fagnolle, Philippeville		
Falaën Castle	Falaën, Onhaye		
Château de La Falize	La Bruyère		
Falnuée Castle	Mazy, Gembloux		
Château de Faulx-les-Tombes	Faulx-les-Tombes, Gesves		
Château de Fenffe	Houyet		
Château de Ferage	Houyet		
Fernelmont Castle	Noville-les-Bois, Fernelmont	château fort	
Château de Flawinne	Flawinne, Namur		
Château de Florennes	Florennes		
Château de Fontaine	Anthée, Onhaye		
Château de Fontaine	Emptinne, Hamois		
Château de Fooz	Wépion		
Château de la Forge	Onhaye		
Franc-Waret Castle	Franc-Waret, Fernelmont		
Castle of Freÿr	Hastière		
Château de Froidefontaine	Flostoy, Havelange		
Château de Gaiffier	Houx, Yvoir		
Château de Gesves	Gesves		
Château de Goyet	Gesves		
Château de Halloy	Halloy, Ciney		
Château de Haltinne	Haltinne, Gesves		
Château de Hanzinelle	Hanzinelle, Florennes		
Château de Harlue	Harlue, Éghezée		
Hauteroche Castle	Dourbes, Viroinval	château fort	
Haversin Castle	Haversin, Ciney		
Château de Hérock	Houyet		
Château d'Hodoumont	Jallet, Ohey		
Jannée Castle	Jannée, Ciney		
Château de Jennevaux	Jennevaux, Éghezée		
Château de Lamalle	Andenne		
Château-ferme Laneffe	Walcourt		
Château de Lavaux-Sainte-Anne	Lavaux-Sainte-Anne, Rochefort	château fort	
Château de Leignon	Leignon		
Château de Lesve	Lesve, Profondeville		
Château Licot	Viroinval		
Château de Loyers	Loyers		
Château de Maibelle	Florée, Assesse		
Château-ferme de Maizeret ou du Moisnil	Maizeret, Andenne		
Château-ferm de Marchand	Gesves		
Château de Marchovelette	Marchovelette		
Château de Massogne	Pessoux, Ciney		
Château de Mielmont	Onoz, Jemeppe-sur-Sambre		
Château Miranda (Château de Noisy)	Celles		
Château du Moisnil	Maizeret, Andenne		
Montaigle Castle	Falaën, Onhaye	château fort	
Morialmé Castle	Morialmé, Florennes		
Château de Mouffrin	Gemenne, Hamois	château fort	
Château de Namur	Namur		
Citadel of Namur	Namur		
Château-ferme de Natoye	Hamois		
Château d'Onthaine	Achêne, Ciney		
Château d'Ostin	La Bruyère		
Château de Pesche	Pesche, Couvin		
Château de Petit-Leez	Grand-Leez, Gembloers		
Poilvache Castle	Houx, Yvoir	château fort	
Château Le Porcheresse	Porcheresse, Havelange		
Château de Ramezee	Barvaux-Condroz, Havelange		
Château de Reux	Conneux, Ciney		
Château de Revogne	Revogne, Beauraing		
Château comtal de Rochefort	Rochefort	château fort	
Roly Castle	Roly (Belgium), Philippeville	château fort	
Château de Ronchinne	Maillen		
Kasteel van Rougemont	Profondeville		
Château de Ry	Mohiville, Hamois		
Château Sainte-Marie	Beauraing		
Château Saint-Pierre	Beauraing		
Château Saint-Roch	Ciney		
Samart Castle	Samart, Philippeville	castle farm	
Château de Sart-Eustache	Sart-Eustache, Fosses-la-Ville		
Château de Schaltin	Hamois		
Château de Scry	Mettet		
Château de Senzeille	Senzeille, Cerfontaine		
Château de Seron	Forville, Fernelmont		
Château de Skeuvre	Natoye, Hamois		
Sombreffe Castle	Sombreffe	château fort	
Château de Sorinnes	Dinant		
Spontin Castle	Spontin, Yvoir	château fort	
Château de Spy	Spy		
Tour Carrée	Sambreville		
Castle of Tarcienne	Tarcienne		
Château de Forges	Thon-Samson, Andenne		
Château de Thozée	Mettet		
Castle of Thy-le-Château	Thy-le-Château, Walcourt	château fort	
Château de Tour à Filée	Goesnes, Ohey		
Trazegnies Castle	Berzée, Walcourt		
Castle of Vêves	Celles	château fort	
Castle of Vignée	Villers-sur-Lesse, Rochefort		
Vierves-sur-Viroin Castle	Viroinval		
Château de Villers-lez-Heest	La Bruyère		
Château de Villers-sur-Lesse	Villers-sur-Lesse, Rochefort		
Château de Vonêche	Vonêche, Beauraing		
Château de Walzin	Dréhance, Dinant		
Château de Weillen	Onhaye		

=== Walloon Brabant ===
Name	Location	Note	Image
Château d'Argenteuil	Waterloo		
Bacquelaine Castle	Chaumont-Gistoux		
Château Baudemont	Ittre		
Château de Bierbais	Hévillers, Mont-Saint-Guibert		
Blanmont Castle	Blanmont, Chastre		
Bois-Seigneur-Isaac Castle	Ophain-Bois-Seigneur-Isaac, Braine-l'Alleud		
Bonlez Castle	Bonlez, Chaumont-Gistoux		
Château de Bousval	Bousval, Genappe		
Braine Castle	Braine-le-Château		
Château des Cailloux	Jodoigne		
Château de Cense de Glymes	Jodoigne		
Château de Dongelberg	Dongelberg, Jodoigne		
Château de Fonteneau	Nivelles		
Château Genval	Genval		
Château de Gentinnes	Gentinnes		
Château Ghobert	Jodoigne		
Château des Goblet d'Alviella	Court-Saint-Étienne		
Château de l’Hermite	Braine-l'Alleud		
Houtain-le-Val Castle	Houtain-le-Val, Genappe		
Château des Italiens	Clabecq		
Château d'Ittre	Ittre		
Château de Jauche	Jauche, Orp-Jauche		
Château de Linsmeau	Linsmeau, Hélécine		
Château-ferme de Moriensart	Céroux-Mousty, Ottignies-Louvain-la-Neuve		
Opheylissem Castle	Opheylissem, Hélécine		
Opprebais Castle	Opprebais, Incourt		
Château Pastur	Jodoigne		
Château de Piétrebais en Grez	Grez-Doiceau		
Château de Quirini	Dion-le-Val, Chaumont-Gistoux		
Château de Rixensart	Rixensart		
Château Rose	Orp-le-Grand, Orp-Jauche		
Château de Savenel	Nethen, Grez-Doiceau		
Solvay Castle	La Hulpe		
Château de la Tournette	Nivelles		
La Vicomté Castle	Jodoigne		
Château de Walhain	Walhain-Saint-Paul		
Zeebroeck Castle	Nethen, Grez-Doiceau		
Zétrud-Lumay Castle	Zétrud-Lumay, Jodoigne		

== Bibliography ==
- Luc Fr. Genicot (dir.), Châteaux forts et châteaux-fermes, Vokaer, Brussels, 1975
- Luc Fr. Genicot (dir.), Châteaux de plaisance, Vokaer, Brussels, 1977
- Albert de Visscher (dir.), Les plus beaux châteaux de Belgique, Reader's Digest, Brussels, 1984
- Philippe Farcy, 100 Châteaux de Belgique connus & méconnus, t. I, Aparté, Brussels, 2002
- Philippe Farcy, 100 Châteaux de Belgique connus & méconnus, t. II, Aparté, Brussels, 2003
- Philippe Farcy, 100 Châteaux de Belgique connus & méconnus, t. III, Aparté, Brussels, 2004
- Philippe Farcy, 100 Châteaux de Belgique connus & méconnus, t. IV, Aparté, Brussels, 2005
- François-Emmanuel de Wasseige, « L’évolution des châteaux belges au XX^{e} siècle », in : Demeures Historiques et Jardins, n° 153–156, Brussels, 2007
- François-Emmanuel de Wasseige, La route des châteaux, éd. Institut du Patrimoine wallon (coll. Itinéraires du patrimoine, 6), Namur, 2012
