= Zétrud-Lumay Castle =

Castle in Zétrud-Lumay, Belgium

- Jodoigne, Wallonia, Belgium
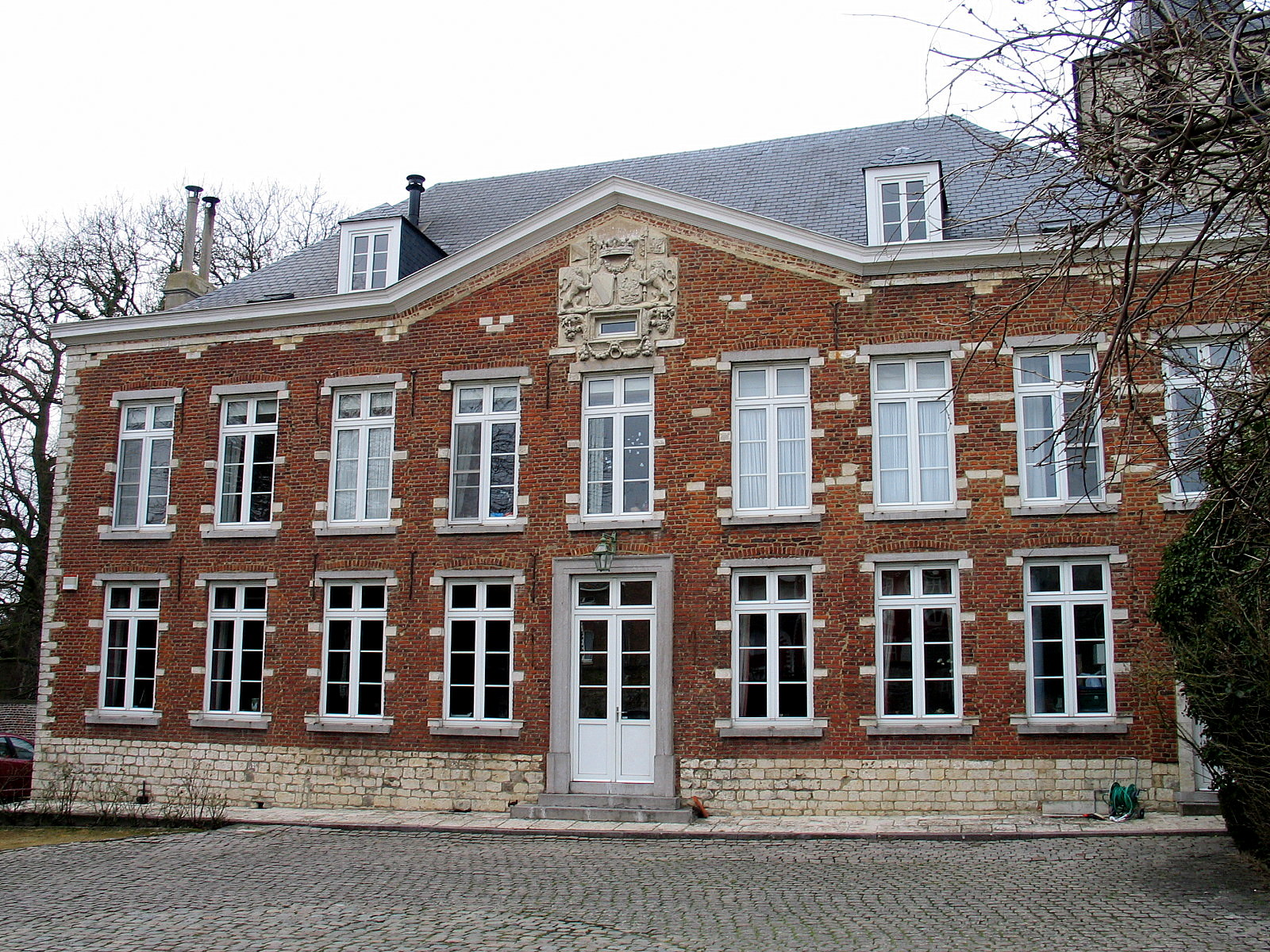

Site information
- Type: Castle

Location
- Coordinates: 50.7621°N 4.9011°E

Site history
- Built: 1842

Zétrud-Lumay Castle is a castle located in Wallonia in the village of Zétrud-Lumay, which is part of the municipality Jodoigne, Walloon Brabant, Belgium.

== See also ==
- List of castles in Belgium
