= Thoricourt Castle =

Castle in Belgium

Coordinates: 50.617°N 3.952°E

- Belgium

Site information
- Type: Castle
- Open to the public: No, Possible to Reserve

Thoricourt Castle is a castle in Belgium.

== See also ==
- List of castles in Belgium
