= Zeebroeck Castle =

Castle in Wallonia, Belgium

Coordinates: 50°47′0.46″N 4°40′21.06″E

- Belgium

Site information
- Type: Castle

Zeebroeck Castle is a castle in Nethen, Wallonia in the municipality of Grez-Doiceau, in the province of Walloon Brabant, Belgium.

== See also ==
- List of castles in Belgium
