= Château d'Ossogne =

Castle in Thuillies, Belgium

Coordinates: 50.297°N 4.332°E

- Thuillies, Belgium

Site information
- Type: Castle

Château d'Ossogne is a castle located in Thuillies, Hainaut Province in Belgium.

== See also ==
- List of castles in Belgium
