= Ommerstein Castle =

Castle in the province of Limburg, Belgium

Coordinates: 51.046°N 5.742°E

- Belgium
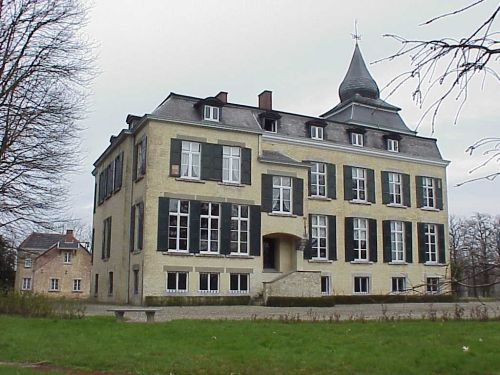

Site information
- Type: Castle

Ommerstein Castle (Dutch: Kasteel van Ommerstein) is a castle in the village of Rotem in the municipality of Dilsen-Stokkem, province of Limburg, Belgium.

The history of the castle goes back to the 13th century, but most of the present Neo-classical building dates from the 18th century, although the donjon survives from earlier.

The surrounding park is distinguished by its possession of a number of giant sequoias and cedars of Lebanon, including one believed to be the thickest in Belgium. There are also several ponds round the castle.

== See also ==
- List of castles in Belgium
