= Hasselbrouck Castle =

Castle in Hasselbroek, Belgium

Coordinates: 50.7221°N 5.2099°E

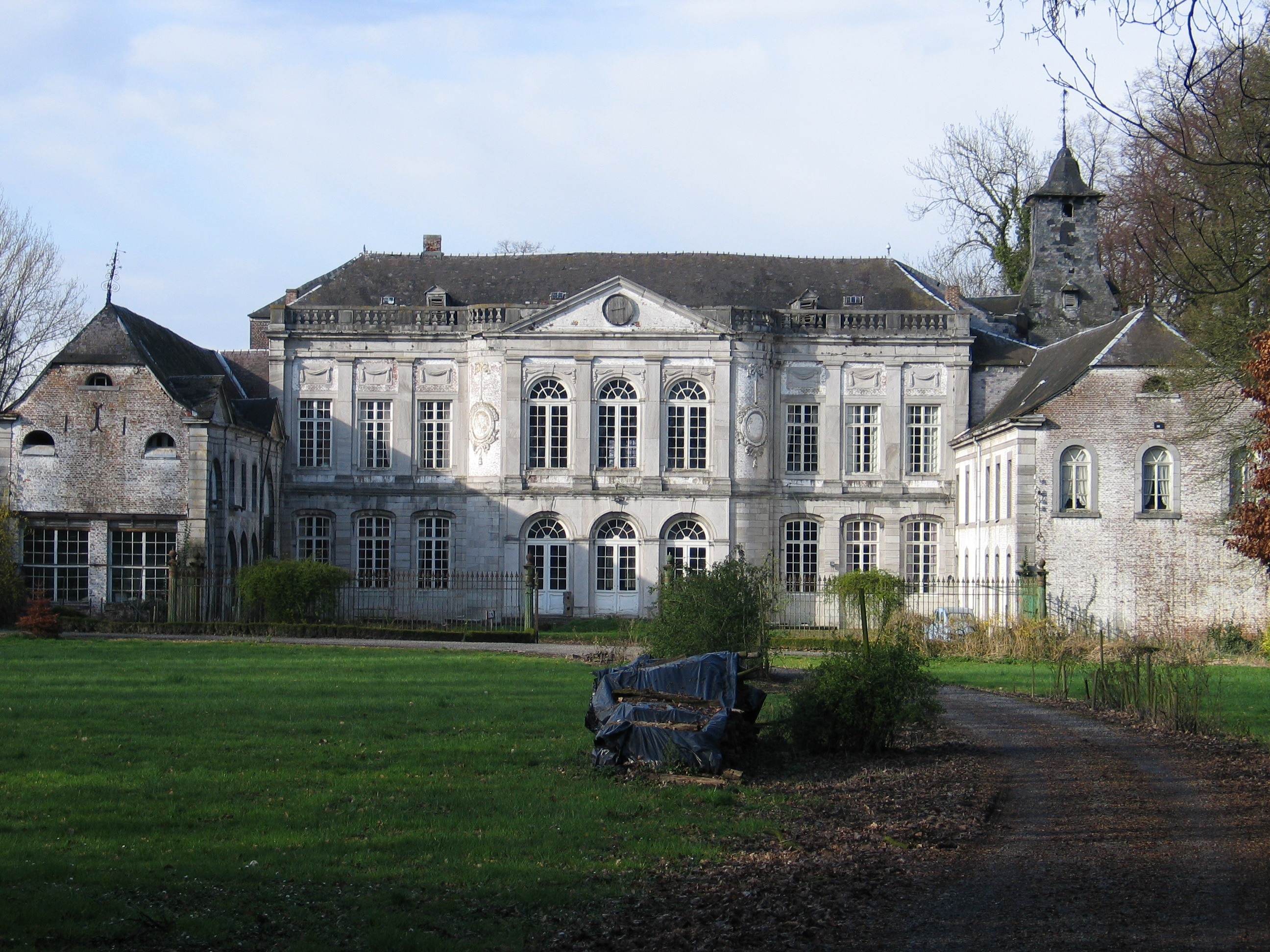
Hasselbroek Castle

Hasselbroek Castle (Dutch: Kasteel van Hasselbroek), also Hasselbrouck Castle (French: Château de Hasselbrouck) is a 17th-century country house in Hasselbroek, in Jeuk, a part of the municipality of Gingelom, province of Limburg, Belgium.

The building was constructed in a U-shape. The right wing in Maasland Renaissance style dates from 1620. Architect Jacques Barthelemy Renoz, born in Liège (1729–1786) built the neoclassical wing main building in 1770. The left wing was for the use of dependencies.

The castle was built by the Bormans van Hasselbroek family. Jean-Henri Bormans of Hasselblad Broek (1706–1774) undertook a variety of expansions and improvements. He was personal advisor to Prince-Bishop Franciscus Karel de Velbrück.

Architect Jacques Barthelemy Renoz, born in Liège (1729–1786) built the neoclassical wing in 1770.

== See also ==
- List of castles in Belgium

== Sources ==
- Castle website (in Dutch and French)
