= Castle of Waha =

Castle in Waha, Wallonia, Belgium

Coordinates: 50.215°N 5.345°E

- Belgium
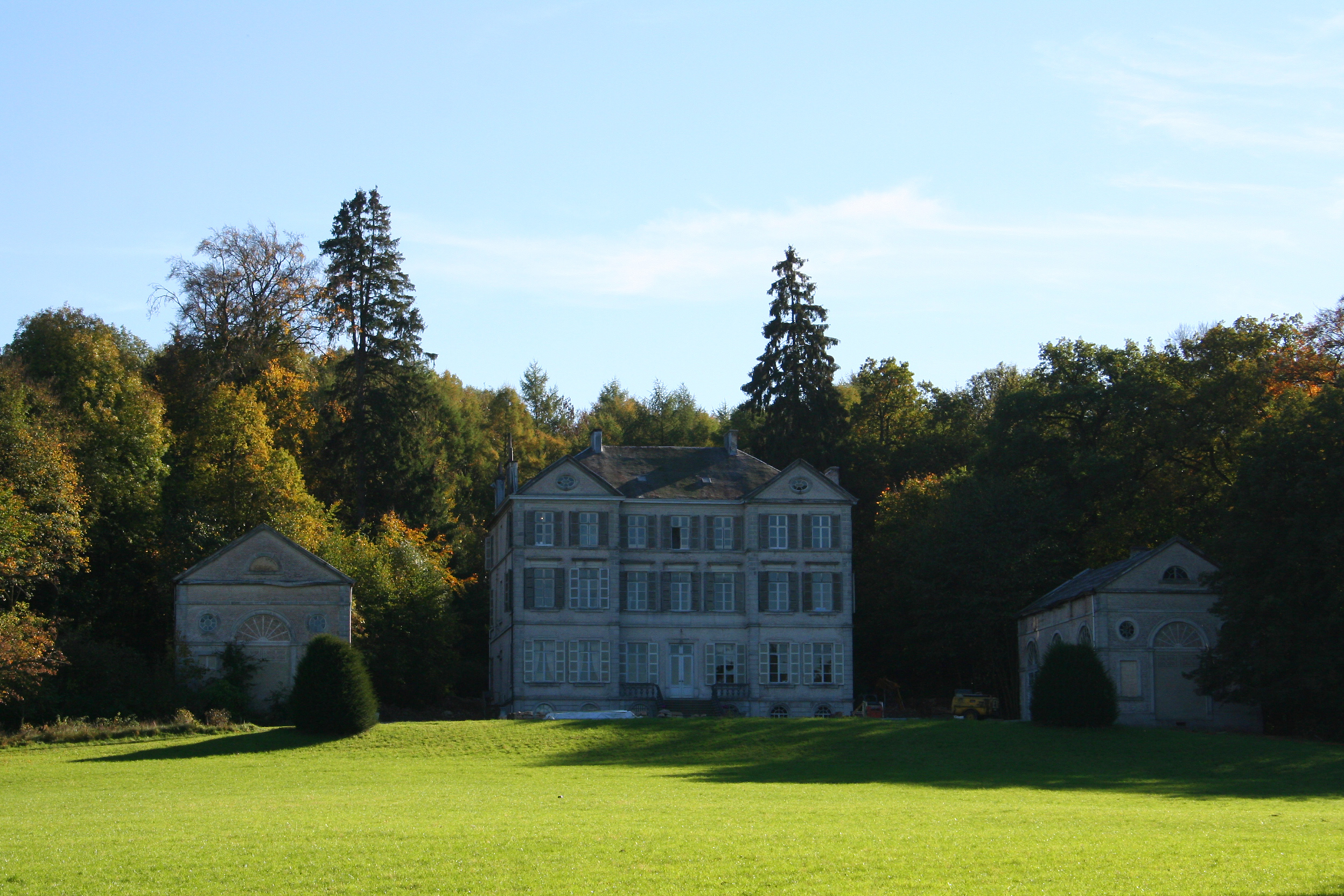

Site information
- Type: Castle

Site history
- Built: 1842 - 1844

The Castle of Waha (French: Château de Waha) is a neoclassical castle in Waha, Wallonia, Belgium. It was constructed between 1842 and 1844.

== See also ==
- List of castles in Belgium
