= Dave Castle =

Castle in Namur, Belgium

Coordinates: 50.412°N 4.885°E

- Wallonia, Belgium
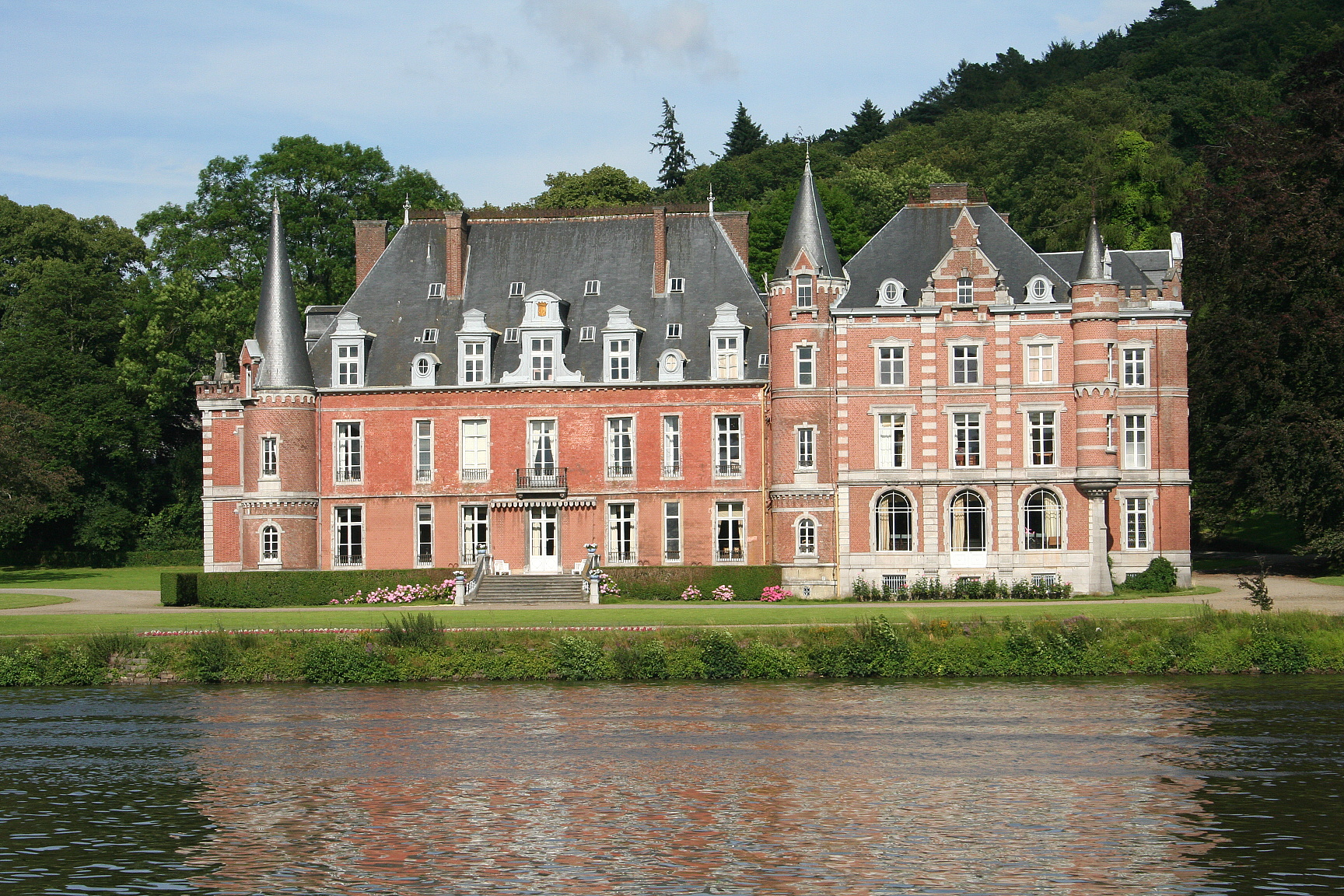

Site information
- Type: Castle

Dave Castle, also known as Fernan-Núñez Castle (French: Château de Dave, Château Fernan-Núñez) is a château in the village of Dave, Wallonia, also known as Dave-sur-Meuse, now a part of the city of Namur, Belgium.

The château stands on the banks of the Meuse. It was originally a medieval structure, the centre of power of the influential sieurs de Dave, but was ruined in the 17th century, and re-constructed in the 18th and 19th centuries by the Dukes of Fernan-Nuñez, whence the alternative name.

== See also ==
- List of castles in Belgium
