= Cleydael Castle =

Castle in Belgium

Coordinates: 51.138°N 4.364°E

- Belgium

Site information
- Type: Castle

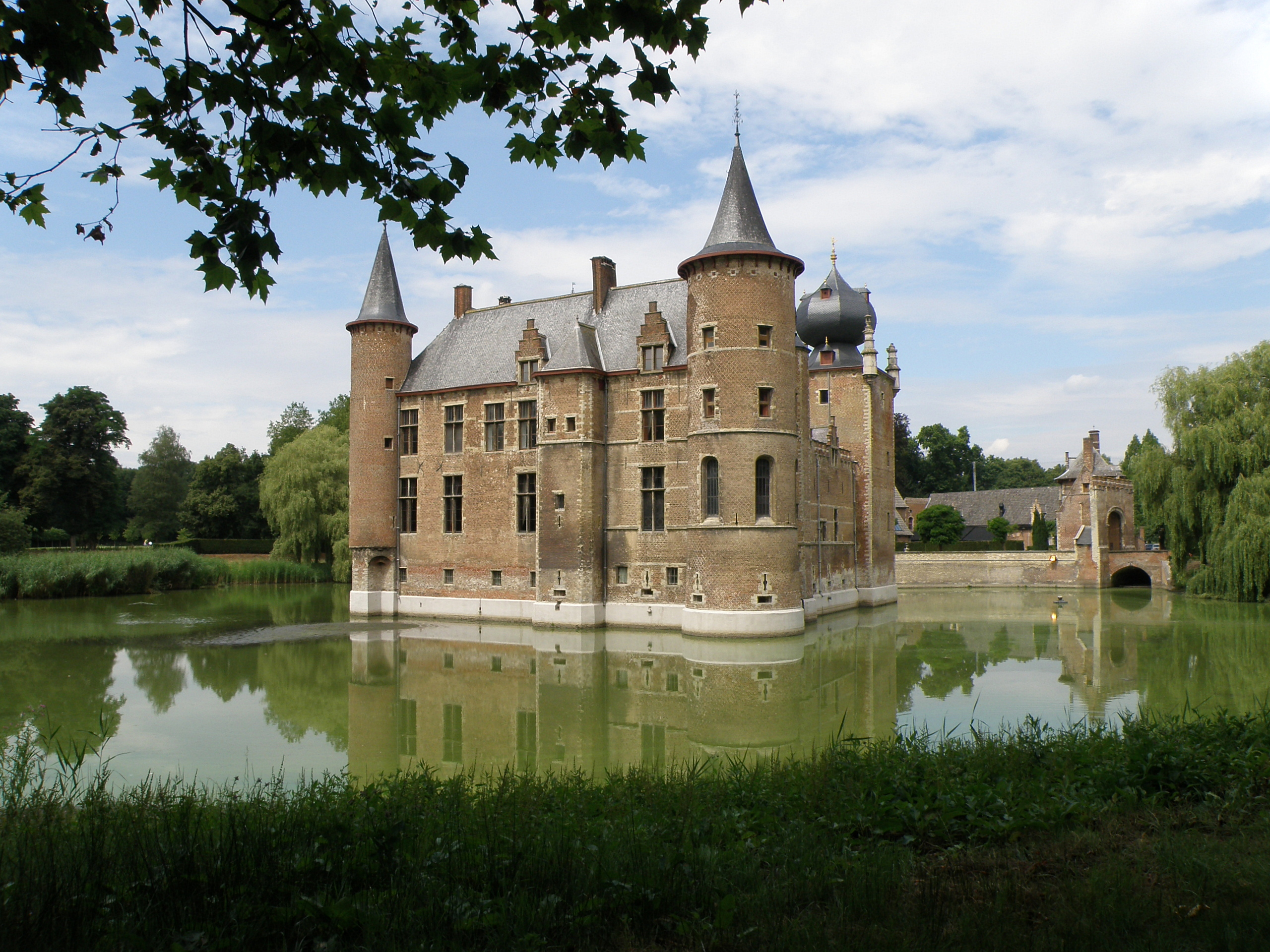

Cleydael Castle (Dutch: Kasteel Cleydael) is a moated castle in Aartselaar in the province of Antwerp, Belgium. Cleydael Castle is situated at an altitude of 8 meters.

Parts of the building date from the 14th century. The castle was the home of the lords of Cleydael until the end of the 18th century. After being part of the golf course, it is now private property again.

== See also ==
- List of castles in Belgium

== Sources ==
- Cleydael website (in Dutch)
