= Nokere Castle =

Castle in Kruishoutem, Belgium

Coordinates: 50.880°N 3.500°E

- Belgium
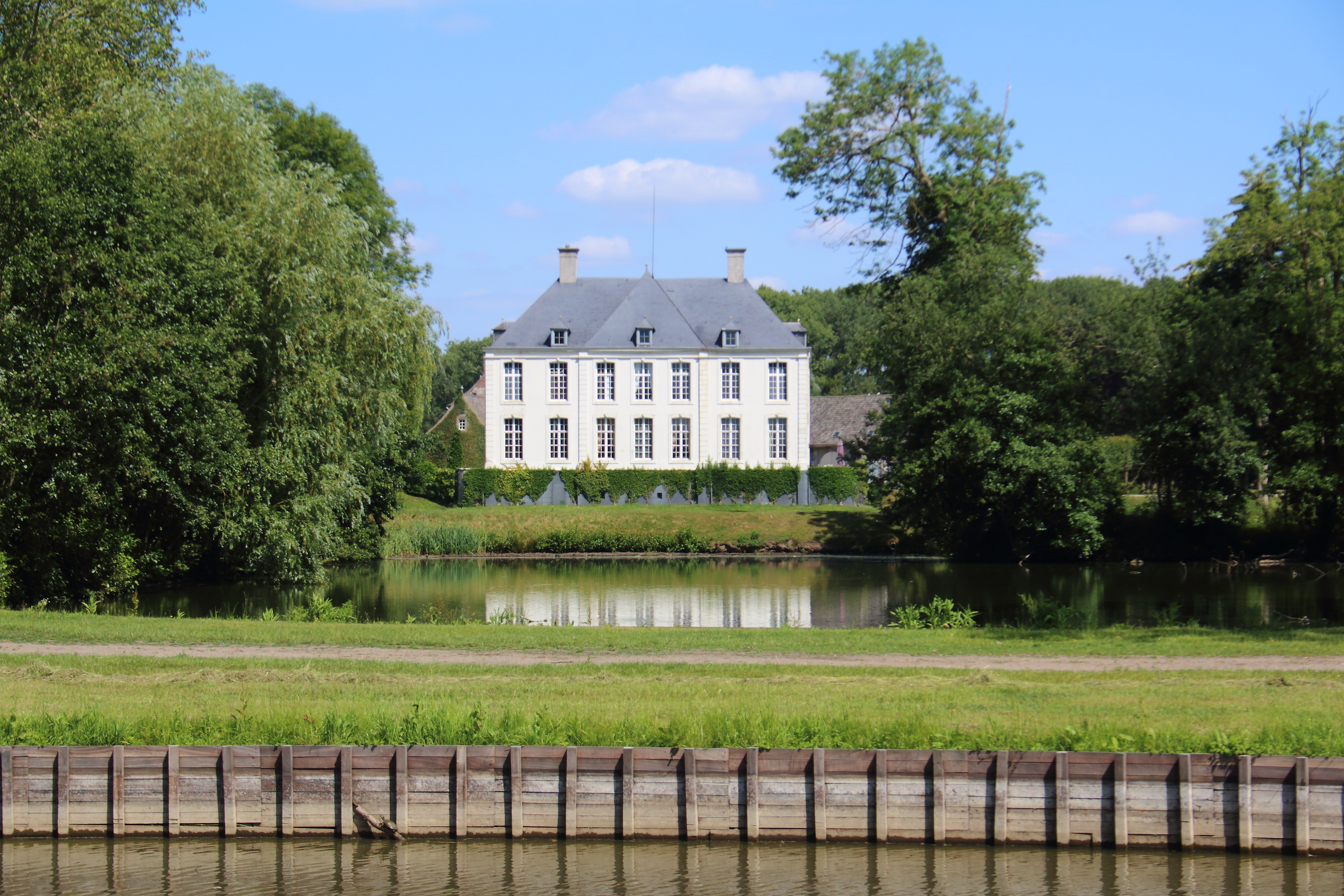
- Nokere Castle

Site information
- Type: Castle

Nokere Castle or Castle Casier is a castle in Kruishoutem, Belgium.

== History ==
The castle dates from before the 16th century and burned down in 1596. It was rebuilt by Mathieu-Xavier de Ghellinck, who had purchased the Nokere estate in 1727. Between 1773 and 1783, the two side wings were added, giving the castle its current Classicist appearance. Nearby are several service buildings, including a 17th-century gatehouse with the tombstone of Jacob van Gavere and a coach house with an assortment of carriages from the 18th and 19th centuries.

Under the subsequent owners, the Vanhove, de Witte, and Wasseige families, the estate and building remained virtually unchanged. Since 1946, it has been owned by Baron Casier, who renovated the castle interior and partially redesigned the park in the 18th-century tradition, in consultation with the renowned landscape architect René Pechère.

== See also ==
- List of castles in Belgium
