= Donnea Castle =

Castle in Guigoven, Belgium

- Guigoven, Belgium
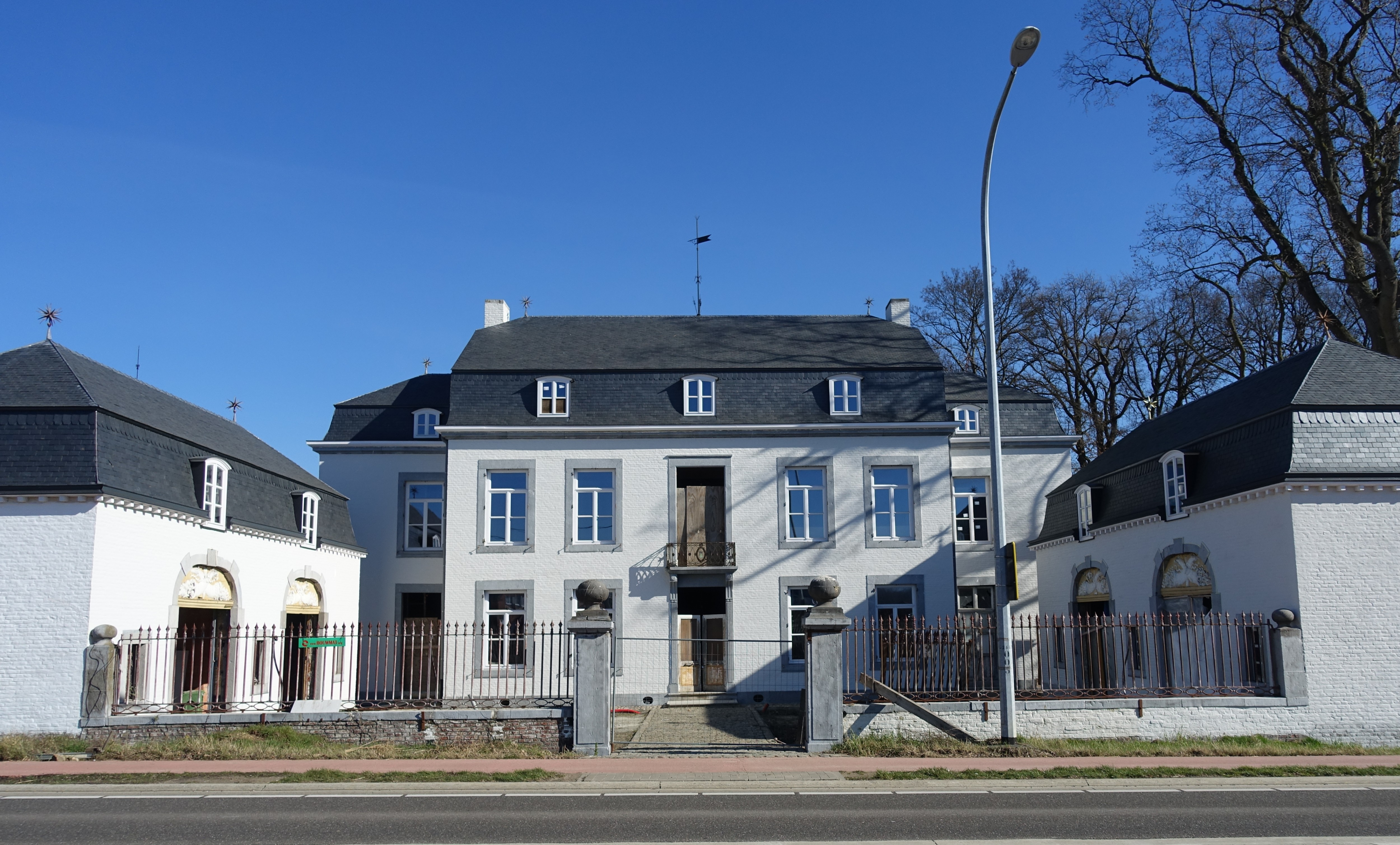

Site information
- Type: Castle
- Condition: Intact

Location
- Coordinates: 50.837°N 5.4008°E

Site history
- Built: 1801

Donnea Castle (Dutch: Kasteel de Donnea) is a castle in the village Guigoven, municipality of Kortessem, eastern Belgium. The main building was built in 1801–1802.

== See also ==
- List of castles in Belgium
