= Jannée Castle =

Castle in Wallonia, Belgium

Coordinates: 50.283°N 5.209°E

- Wallonia, Belgium

Site information
- Type: Castle

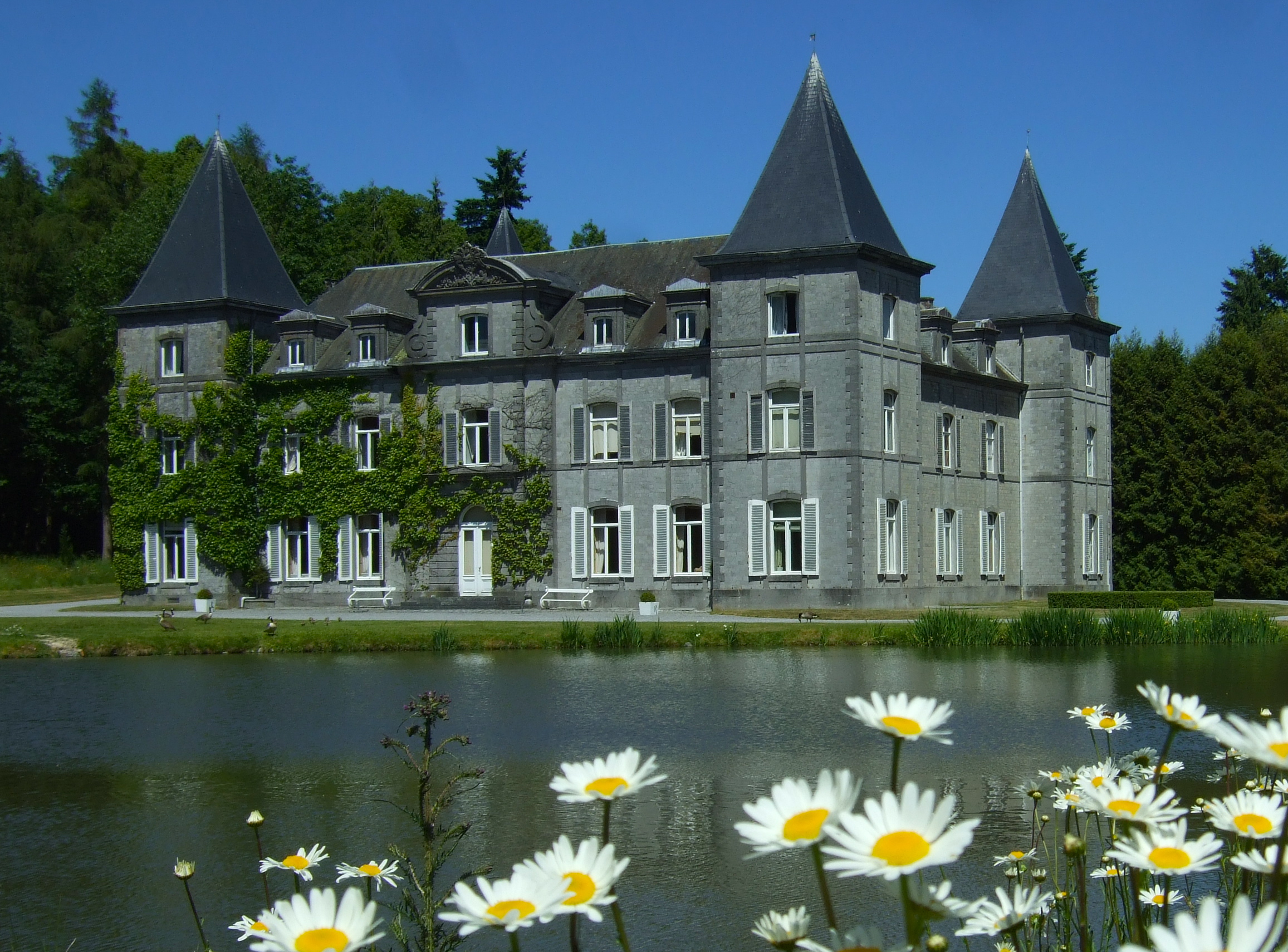
Château de Jannée.

Jannée Castle (French: Château de Jannée) is a castle in Jannée in the village of Pessoux, municipality of Ciney, province of Namur, Wallonia, Belgium.

== See also ==
- List of castles in Belgium

== Sources ==
- Château de Jannée official website (in French)
