= La Vicomté Castle =

Castle in Jodoigne, Belgium

- Belgium

Site information
- Type: Castle

Location
- Location within Belgium
- Coordinates: 50.725789°N 4.866481°E

La Vicomté Castle is a castle located in Wallonia in the municipality of Jodoigne, Walloon Brabant, Belgium.

== See also ==
- List of castles in Belgium
