= Château des Cailloux =

Castle in Jodoigne, Wallonia, Belgium

- Jodoigne, Wallonia, Belgium

Site information
- Type: Castle

Location
- Coordinates: 50.7125°N 4.8875°E

Site history
- Built: 1881-1883

Château des Cailloux (French pronunciation: [ʃato de kaju]) is a castle in Jodoigne, Wallonia, Belgium. It was built in a neo-renaissance style in 1881–1883. After a fire in 1952, the roof was rebuilt in a more simple fashion.

== See also ==
- List of castles in Belgium
