= Templeuve Castle =

Castle in Belgium

- Belgium
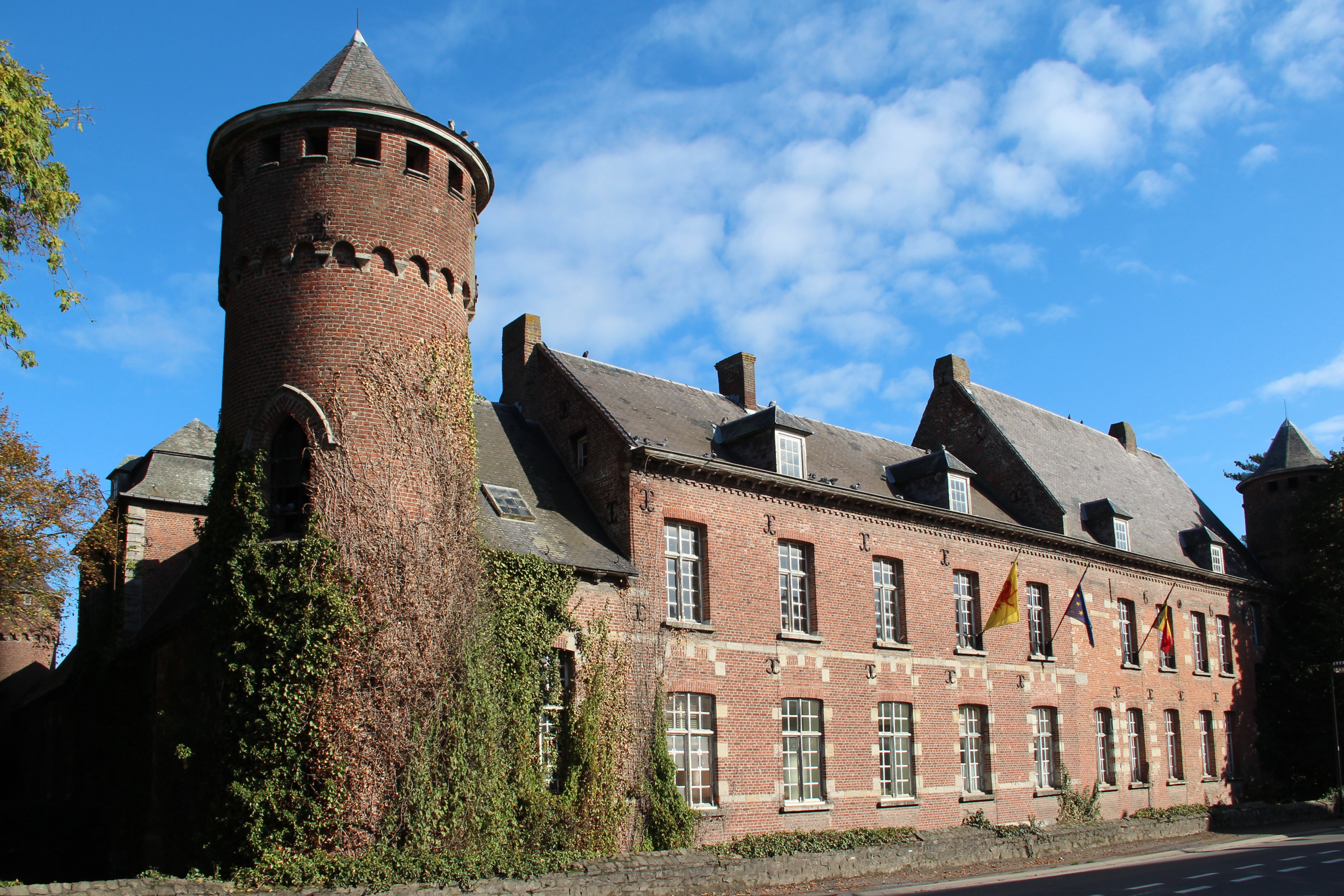
- Templeuve Castle

Site information
- Type: Castle

Location
- Coordinates: 50°38′41.85″N 3°17′2.92″E

Templeuve Castle, also known as Castle of Formanoir de La Cazerie, is a castle in Templeuve Belgium.

== See also ==
- List of castles in Belgium
