= Reijvissche Castle =

Castle in Belgium

Coordinates: 51.0127°N 3.6923°E

Reyvissche Castle
- Belgium
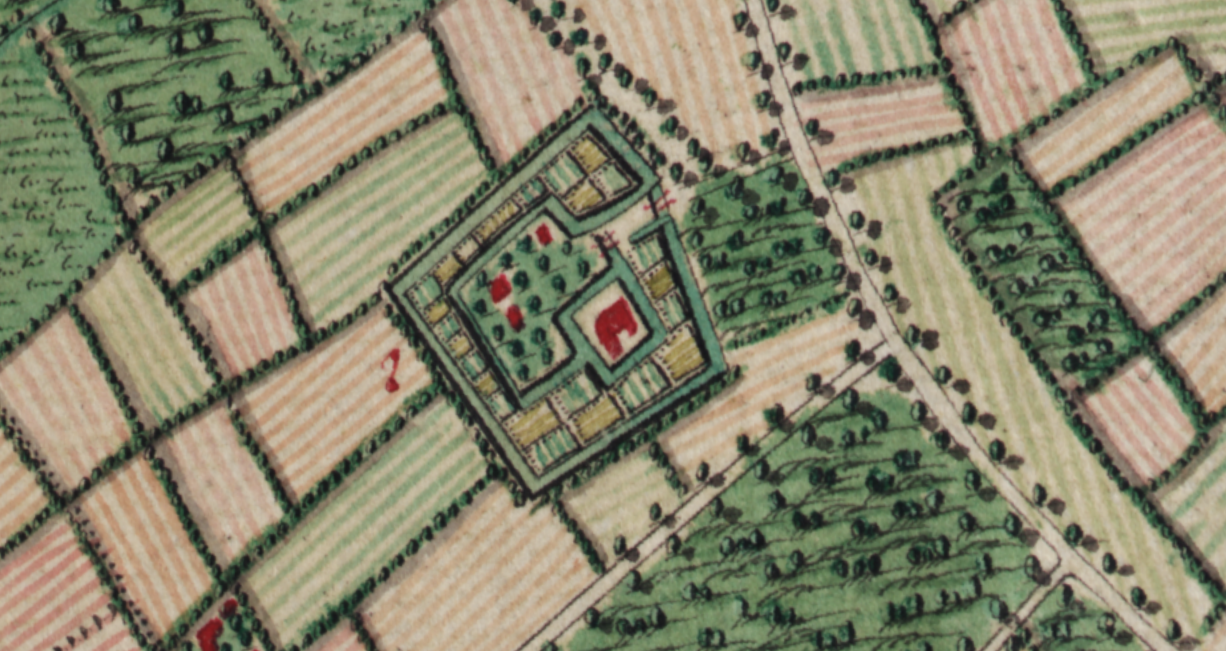
- Reyvissche on Ferraris map

Site information
- Type: Castle

Reyvissche Castle is a castle in Zwijnaarde Belgium.

== See also ==
- List of castles in Belgium
