= Nieuwerkerken Castle =

Castle in Belgium

Coordinates: 50.869589°N 5.200067°E

- Belgium
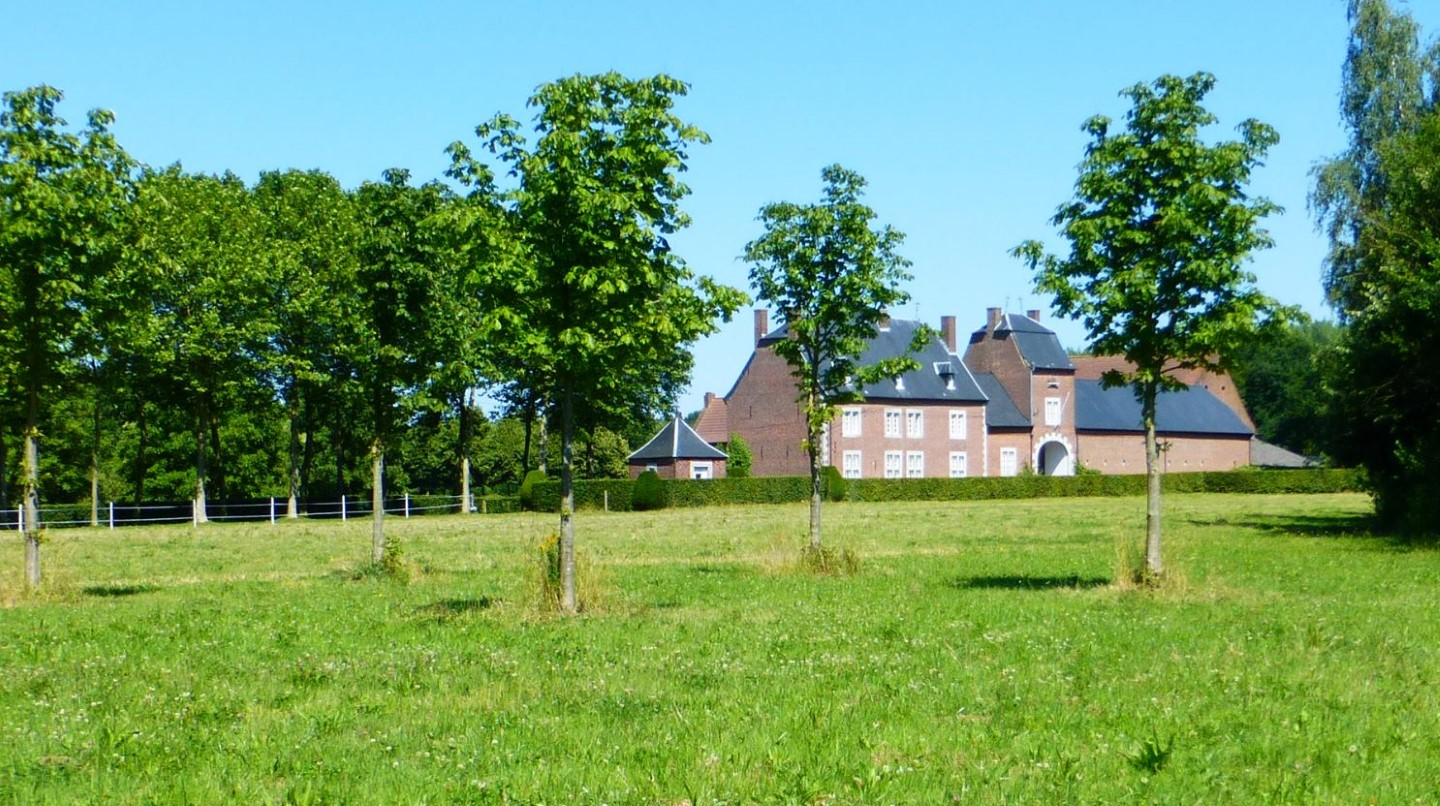

Site information
- Type: Castle

Nieuwerkerken Castle is a castle in Nieuwerkerken, Belgium.

== See also ==
- List of castles in Belgium
