= Blanmont Castle =

Castle in Blanmont, Belgium

Coordinates: 50.620°N 4.638°E

- Wallonia, Belgium

Site information
- Type: Castle

Blanmont Castle (Château de Blanmont) is a castle in Blanmont in the municipality of Chastre, Walloon Brabant, Wallonia, Belgium. The present buildings date from the 17th and 18th centuries, on an older site.

== See also ==
- List of castles in Belgium
