= Guirsch Castle =

Castle in Wallonia, Belgium

Coordinates: 49.719°N 5.855°E

Guirsch Castle (French: Château de Guirsch) is a château in the village of Guirsch near Arlon, in the Province of Luxembourg, Wallonia, Belgium. The present buildings, surrounded by a large formal garden, were constructed between 1749 and 1763 and are the property of the de Wykerslooth de Rooyesteyn family. There is no public access.

== See also ==
- List of castles in Belgium
