= Ter Leyen Castle =

Castle in Boekhoute Belgium

Coordinates: 51.256°N 3.718°E

- Belgium
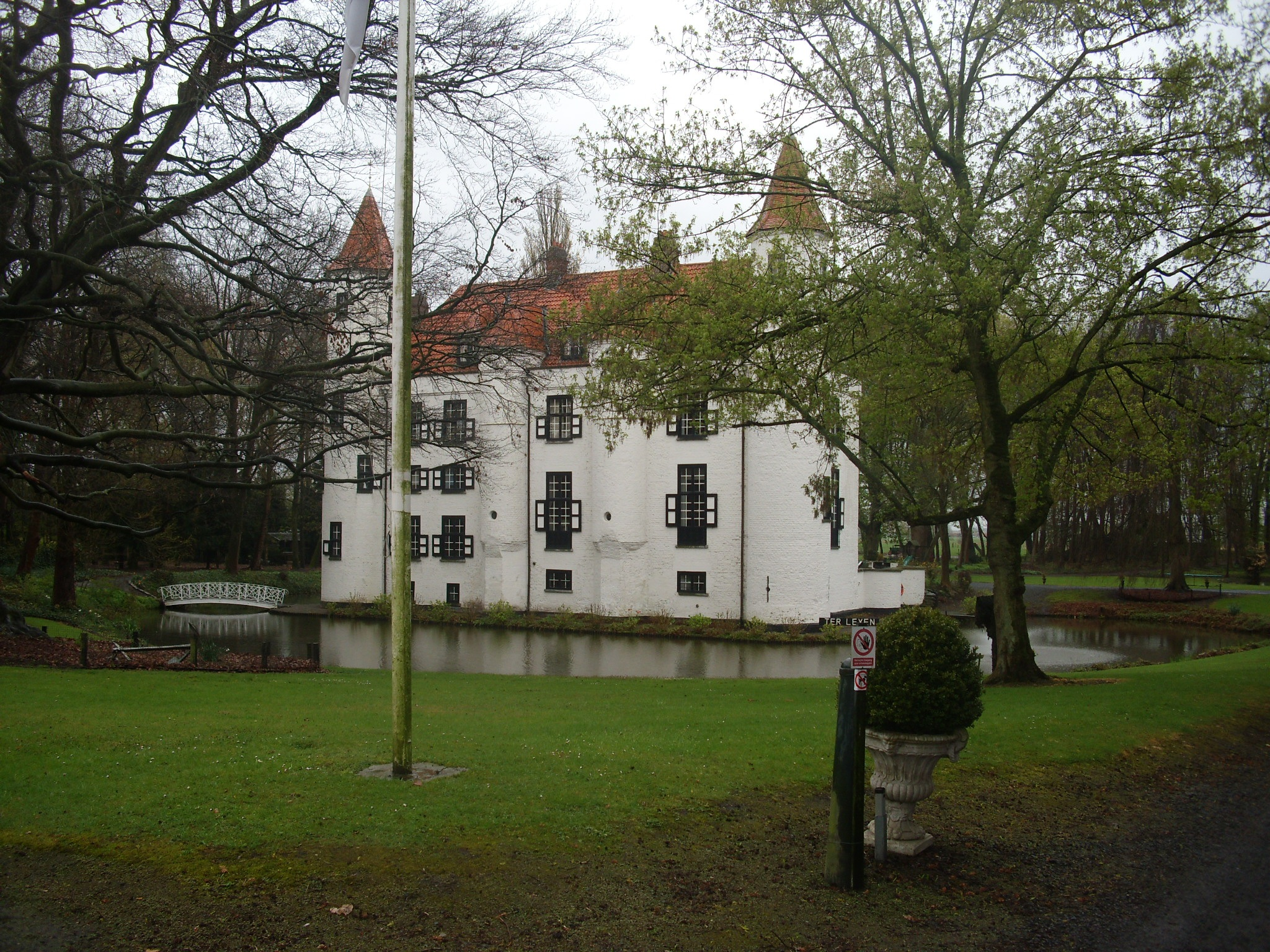

Site information
- Type: Castle

Ter Leyen Castle is a castle in Boekhoute Belgium. It is first mentioned as a castle in 1511 but may have been mentioned in the early 15th century as a house ("behuusde stede" (Note: Maurits Vandecasteele explaines in Tijdschrift voor Nederlandse Taal- en Letterkunde what this concept entails.)).

== See also ==
- List of castles in Belgium
