= Kruishoutem Castle =

Castle in East Flanders, Belgium

Coordinates: 50.907°N 3.533°E

- Belgium
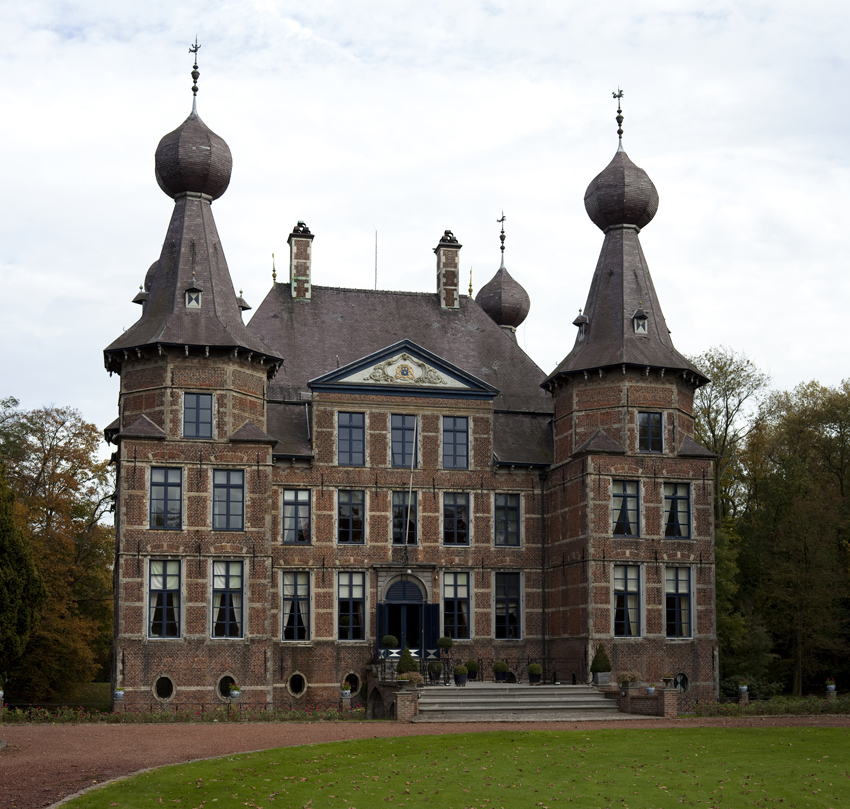

Site information
- Type: Castle

Kruishoutem Castle is a castle in Kruishoutem Belgium. This castle was constructed in the 17th century and is recognized as an architectural heritage site. It is situated in East Flanders, approximately 15 kilometers from the larger city of Ghent.

== See also ==
- List of castles in Belgium
