= Landwijk Castle =

Castle in Herk-de-Stad, Belgium

- Belgium

Site information
- Type: Castle

Location
- Coordinates: 50.9429°N 5.1229°E

Landwijk Castle is a castle in the municipality of Herk-de-Stad, Belgium.

== See also ==
- List of castles in Belgium
