= Château Rose =

Castle in Orp-Jauche, Belgium

- Belgium

Site information
- Type: Castle

Location
- Coordinates: 50°41′41.24″N 4°59′27.29″E

Château Rose ("pink castle") is a château in Orp-le-Petit in the municipality of Orp-Jauche, Walloon Brabant, Wallonia, Belgium.

== See also ==
- List of castles in Belgium
