= Laval Castle (Belgium) =

Medieval fortified farmhouse in Belgium

Coordinates: 50.011°N 5.572°E

- Belgium

Site information
- Type: Castle

Laval Castle (French: Château-ferme de Laval) is a château-ferme, or fortified farmhouse, in the hamlet of Laval in Tillet in the municipality of Sainte-Ode, province of Luxembourg, Wallonia, Belgium.

The present building is a house of the 17th century, the oldest surviving part of which is a cellar of the 14th century, from a previous structure. The château-ferme is open to the public, and its outbuildings are available for overnight accommodation.

== See also ==
- List of castles in Belgium
