= Pailhe =

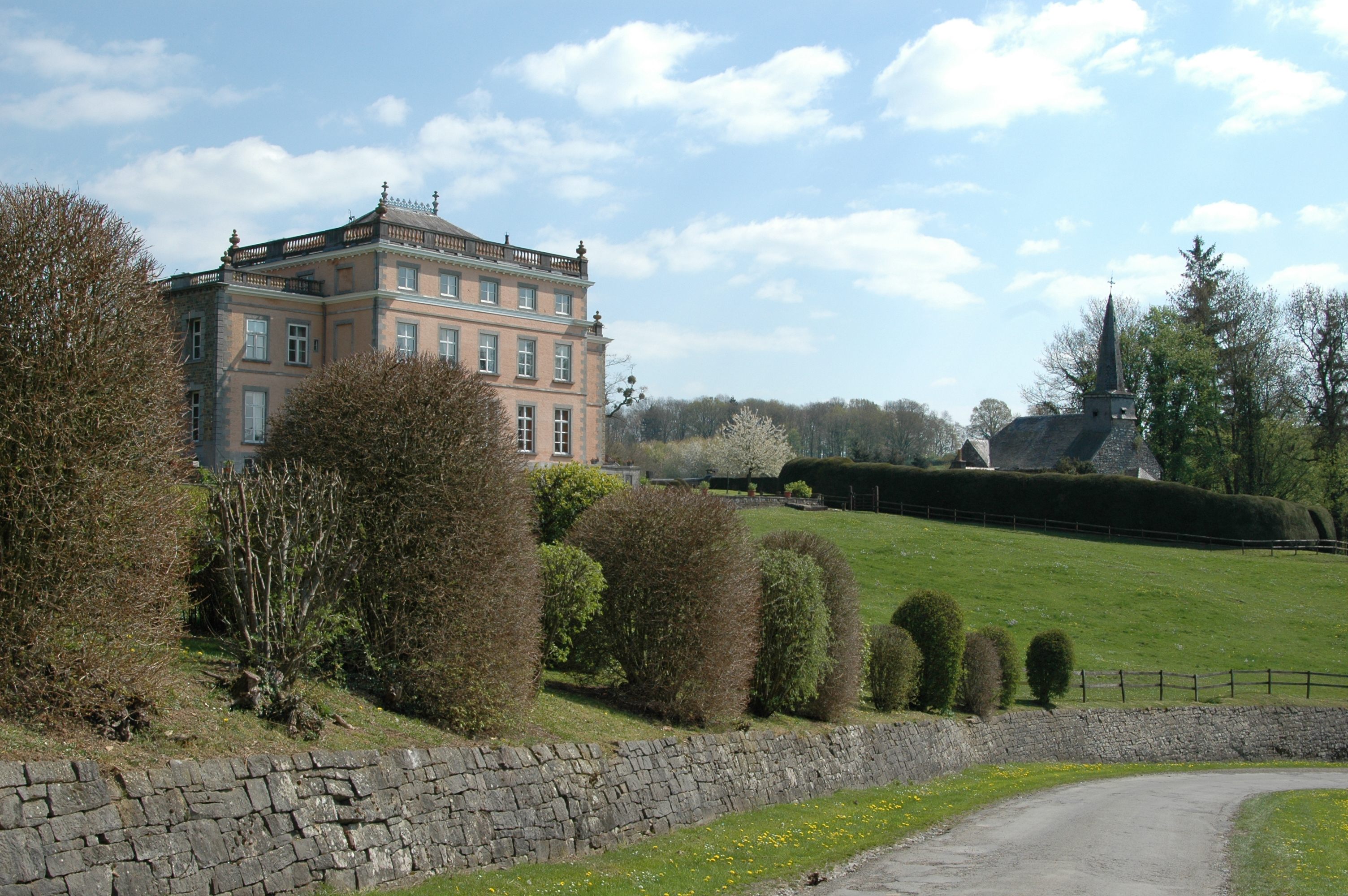
- The hamlet of Saint-Fontaine with its château and chapel, part of Pailhe

- Location within Belgium Location within Europe
- Coordinates: 50°25′24″N 05°15′29″E
- Country: Belgium
- Region: Wallonia
- Province: Liège
- Municipality: Clavier

Pailhe (French pronunciation: [paj]) is a district of the municipality of Clavier, located in the province of Liège in Wallonia, Belgium.

The settlement consists of the village Pailhe and the hamlet Saint-Fontaine. The name Pailhe is mentioned in written sources for the first time in 1179. It was pillaged by troops from the Duchy of Lorraine at the end of the 17th century. The village church dates from 1847 but contains older furnishings. In Saint-Fontaine there is a Romanesque chapel, dating from the 12th century, and a château built in 1820.
