= Ravenhof Castle (Torhout) =

Museum in Torhout, Belgium

- Kasteel Ravenhof
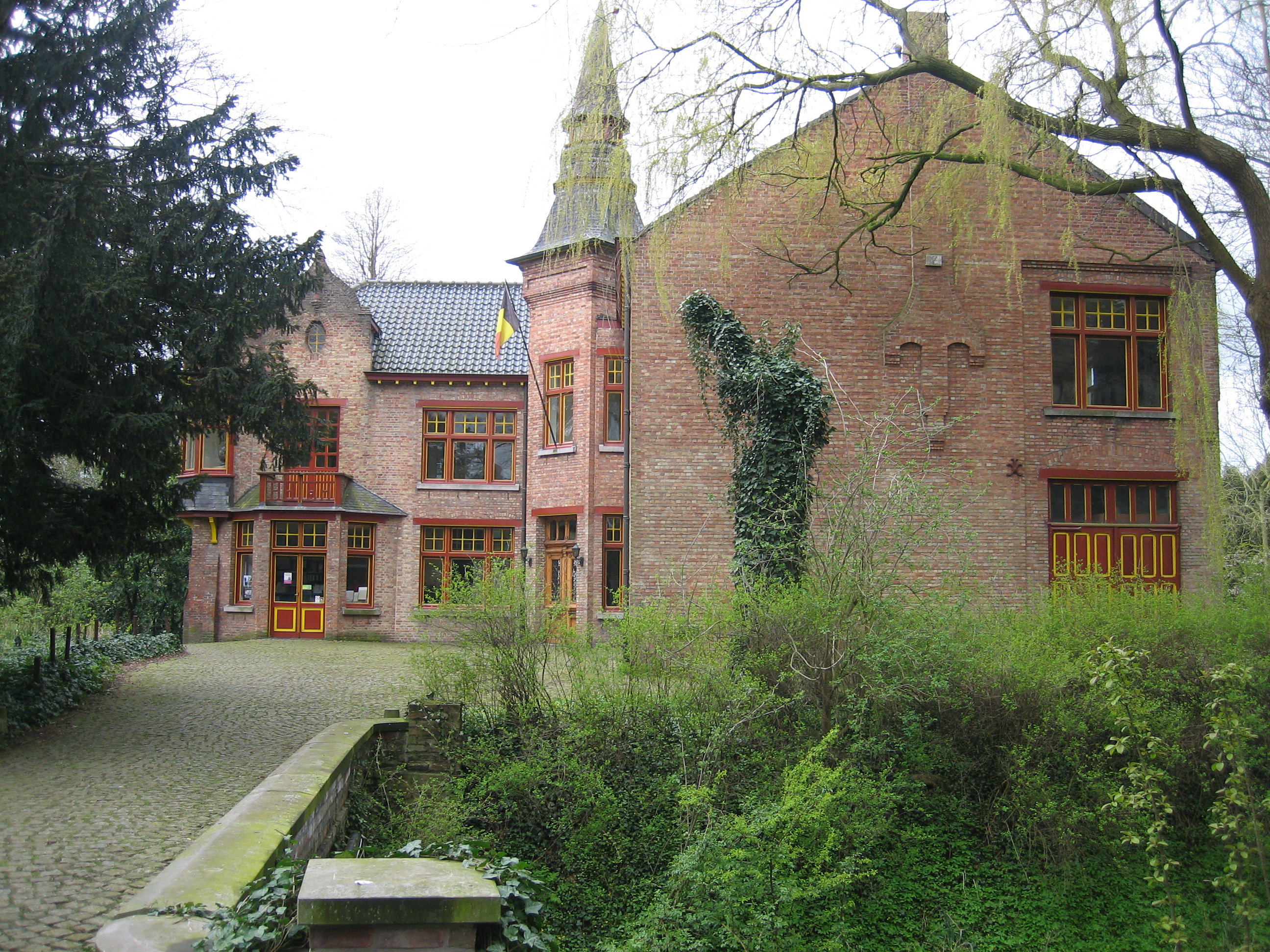
- Ravenhof Castle

- Location within Belgium
- Established: 15th-19th century
- Location: Torhout, West Flanders, Belgium
- Coordinates: 51.078925°N 3.05948351°E
- Type: Castle
- Owner: City of Torhout
- Parking: On site

Ravenhof Castle (Dutch: Kasteel Ravenhof) is a castle in the center of Torhout, West Flanders, Belgium. The city's park surrounds the castle which now serves as a museum and tourist center.

== History ==
The castle is thought to have been built in the 13th–15th century, but the original building was destroyed and the current building was built on the foundation of its predecessor in the 16th century. The castle was surrounded by walls and had an upper and lower courtyard. In the 17th century, the castle was inhabited by the noble family, Decuypere, who controlled the city's cloth industry. In the 18th century, however, the castle became the property of the family, de Potter. Halfway through the 19th century, the castle became the property of René Van Oye who, in 1863, started a linen factory in the building. Between 1850 and 1874, he built a few houses around the property for his employees.

Between 1880 and 1885, the castle was almost entirely rebuilt, and in 1906, a man named Oscar Hostyn bought the property and converted the castle into a shoe factory. The castle's current interior design dates from 1912 to 1913.

During World War I, when Torhout was occupied by the invading German forces, Ravenhof castle was used as a residence for German soldiers.

In 1920, the castle was restored and later sold to the Couppé family. From 1960 onward, the castle and the surrounding domain began to decay.

== Current use ==
The castle was restored again in 1993–1994. After the restoration, the city of Torhout purchased the property; the upper floors of the castle became a museum for Torhouts Pottery and the ground floor is used as a tourist center.
