= Gotem =

Coordinates: 50°48′15″N 05°18′36″E

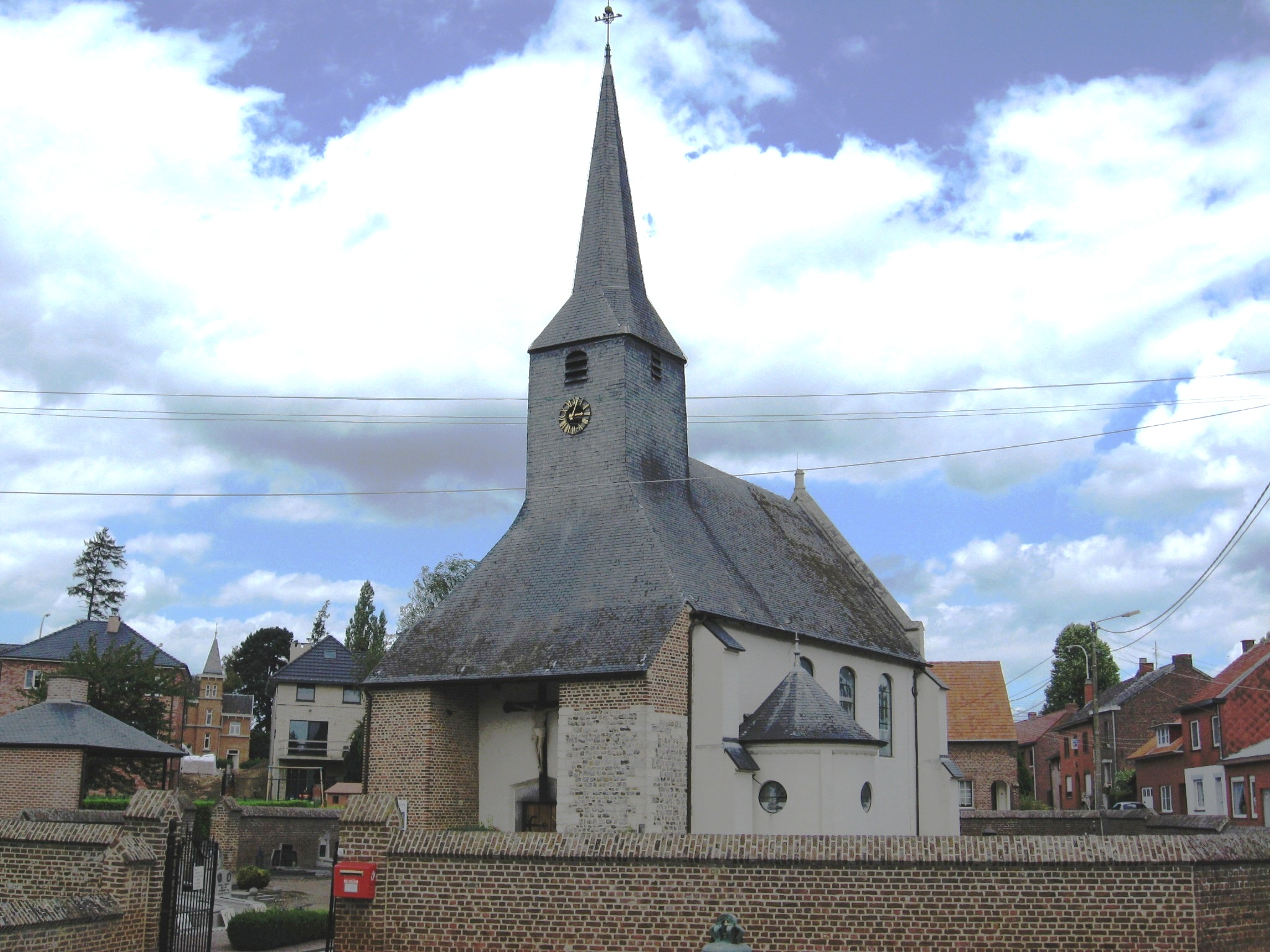
Church of Saint Denis in Gotem

Gotem is a small town in the Limburg province of Belgium and is part of the municipality of Borgloon.

== Statistics ==
Population: 282 (1 January 2002)
Postal code: 3840
Coordinates: 50° 47' 60" N, 5° 17' 60" E
Elevation: 58 meters

== Points of interest ==
- Kasteel Fonteinhof
- Church of Saint Denis
