= Franc-Waret Castle =

Château in Belgium

Coordinates: 50.519°N 4.975°E

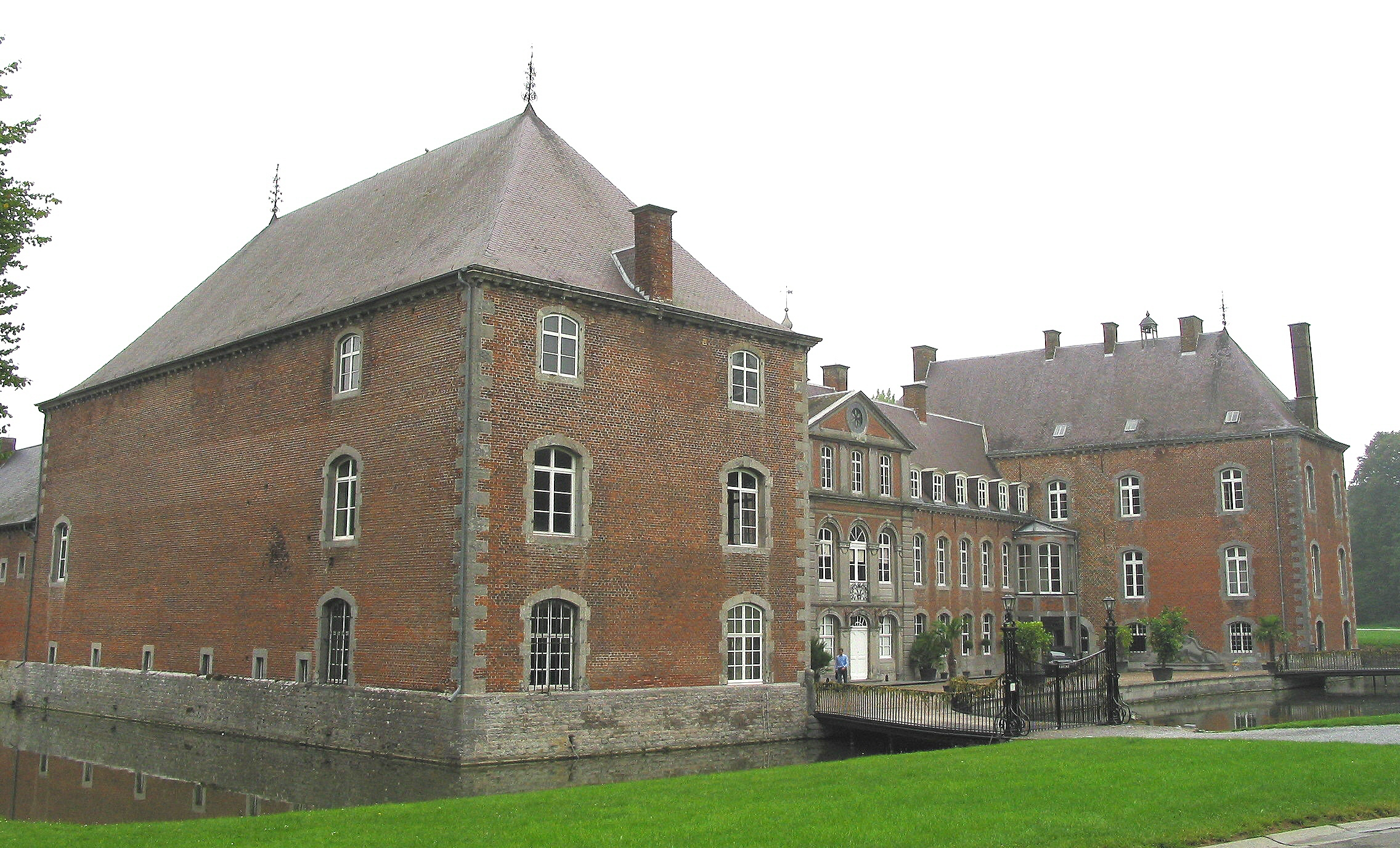
Château de Franc-Waret

The Château de Franc-Waret is a château situated in Franc-Waret in the municipality of Fernelmont in the province of Namur, Wallonia, Belgium. A moat girdles the castle. The castle is adorned by French gardens and an English style garden sprawls over 120 hectares of the palace.

The interiors are equally august as its exteriors. The indoor decor is classic 17th and 18th century, and is decorated with furniture, silverware, porcelain and tapestries. There are old books and paintings, a few of them Brueghel's.

A ferme-château, or large fortified farmhouse, existed on the site in the 13th century. In the 16th century the building and the grounds were acquired and refurbished by the de Groesbeeck family, and later used as their summer residence. The 16th century block survives, still with a drawbridge and angle-towers. Around the middle of the 18th century Alexandre François de Groesbeeck ordered the building of a large residential wing in a rural Louis XV style. The whole is surrounded by moats.

At the end of the 18th century, the property passed into the possession of the Comtes de Croix, and later of the Comtes d'Andigné, who still live there.

The château has beautiful gardens in the formal French style as well as a park in the English style and an orangery.

The interior of the château can be visited by appointment and contains lavishly decorated rooms with fine antique furniture, paintings and tapestries.
