= Manoir de Lébioles =

Manor house in Spa, Belgium

Coordinates: 50.4650°N 5.8315°E

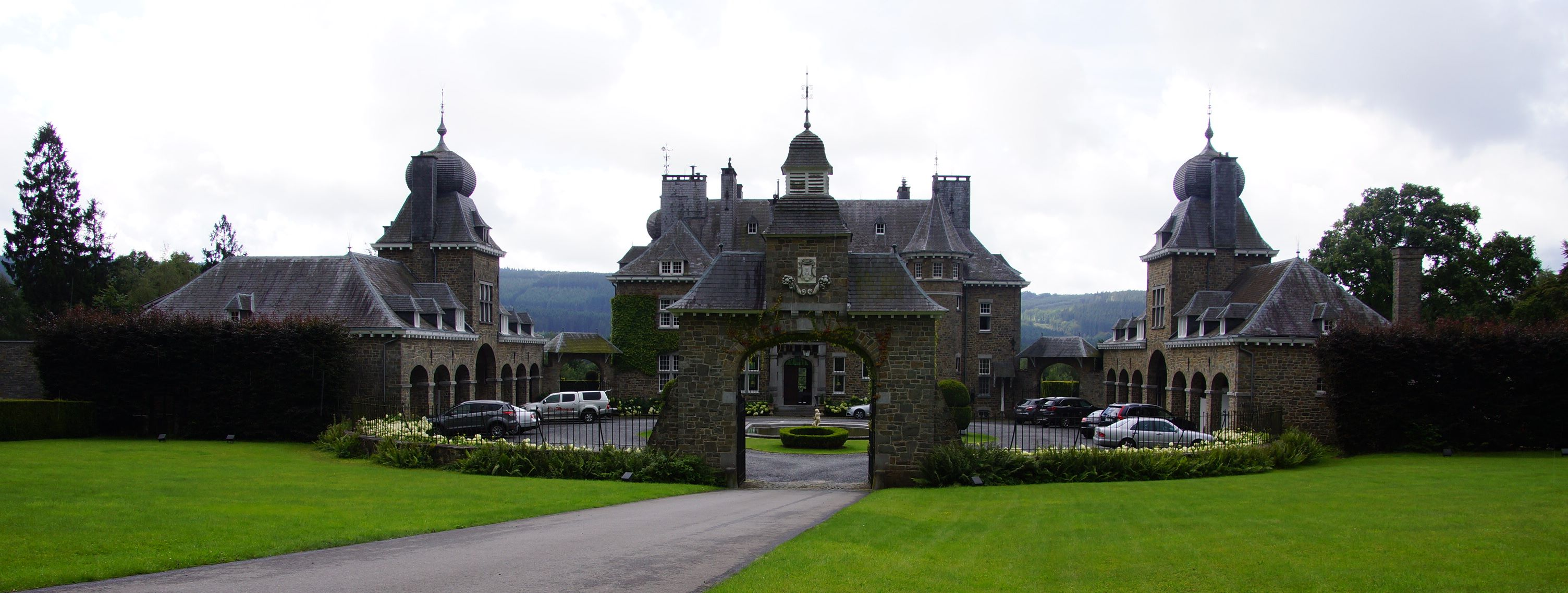
Manoir de Lébioles

Manoir de Lébioles is a castle-like manor house in Creppe, a quarter of Spa in Belgium. Wilhelm II. abdicated there in 1918 from being emperor.

== History ==
The manor was built between 1905 and 1910 by the diplomat Georges Neyt (1842–1910), who lived there only for a short while before he died. His heirs sold the building, which became known as “small Versailles of the Ardennes” in 1912, to Edmond Dresse, who obtained the title "Dresse Lébioles" in 1926. His family lived in the manor until 1981.

In 1945, several high-ranking prisoners of war of the Allies were detained there, e.g. Franz von Papen and admiral Miklós Horthy, im Manoir de Lébioles.

The Dresse family expanded and renovated the building continuously and used it for theater play, hunts and concerts. It was sold in 1980 to the Société Immobilière de Belgique, which resold it to a family of hoteliers, who used it as "Hotel de Charme". They sold it in 1999, and it deteriorated for a few years, before it was fully renovated by rebuilding the chimneys, expanding and reinstalling the old staircases, exposing the historic floors and reglasing the 120-year-old windows. It has been successfully used as a luxury hotel since then.
