= Hody =

Hody is a surname. Notable people with the surname include:

- John Hody (died 1441), MP
- Humphrey Hody, English scholar and theologian
- Les Hody, Hungarian and Australian basketball player
- William Hody (died 1524), served as Attorney General of England and Chief Baron of the Exchequer under King Henry VII

== See also ==
- Hody (Moravia)
- Hody, Wallonia, a district of the municipality of Anthisnes, Belgium
