= Zétrud-Lumay =

Coordinates: 50°46′N 4°53′E

Zétrud-Lumay (Dutch: Zittert-Lummen; Walloon: Séntru) is a village of Wallonia and a district of the municipality of Jodoigne, located in the province of Walloon Brabant, Belgium.
