= Heusden Castle (Belgium) =

- Heusden, Belgium
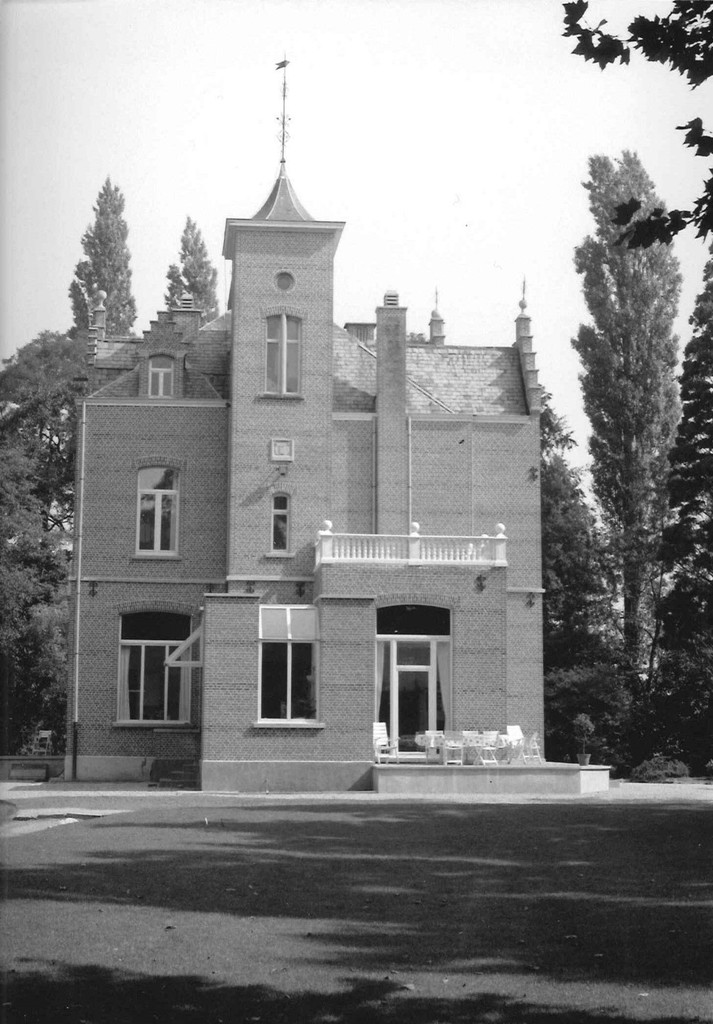
- The 19th-century castle

Site information
- Type: Castle

Location
- Coordinates: 51°3′2.815″N 3°48′50.37″E

Site history
- Built: 11th century (original castle); 1899 (castle built within the former 8-shaped moat)

Heusden Castle is a historical site and castle in Heusden, Destelbergen, Belgium. The present structure was built in 1899 on the grounds of a former castle built in the 11th century. The above-ground parts of the old castle were demolished in the 18th century. The moat of the old castle still exists. In 1911, remains of what were probably dungeons were found, and parts of an older building near the moat were restored.

== History ==
This important historical site was once the residence of the lords of Heusden (the chatelains and later viscounts of Ghent).

Originally the castle had a square keep and ring moat, of motte-and-bailey type, which rose until the early 11th century. The keep was the seat of the Heusden lordship.

Around the year 1200, Beatrix, dame of Heusden, married Zeger III of Ghent. Thanks to this marriage, the castle increased in importance and became the seat of the Viscounty of Ghent.

Zeger added a second circular moated fortress. This formed with the other one an eight-shaped inner circular moat, surrounded by the rectangular outer moat. The lords of Heusden dwelt in the oldest, southwestern part, built up in the square. The northeastern part, build along the moat, had a monumental gate and a courtyard, and was probably destined to the army. The viscounts of Ghent left Heusden Castle in the 14th or 15th century. The seat of the feudal court was then moved to the aldermen's house in the square of Heusden. The castle's ruins were still present in 1725, but then the above-ground structure disappeared.

The 8-shaped inner moat was restored in 1899. During this work new remains were excavated. The keep's foundations and traces of the drawbridge were uncovered. The remains of the castle were restored in 1911, and are visible alongside the bridge, over the southwestern moat. There are remains of wide brick walls, stone water table, various arches (including over the moat), cornerstones and archstones. Further, the remains of what were probably dungeons were found.

=== 19th-century castle ===
The new castle was built in the middle of the old 8-shaped castle. It is eclectic, with a hip roof and sober facade interrupted by arched openings. A square tower with spire stands built against the left side. Front and rear facade (dating to 1899) are in gable stone. The castle was restored in 1987.
