= Ocket Castle =

Castle in Belgium

- Belgium
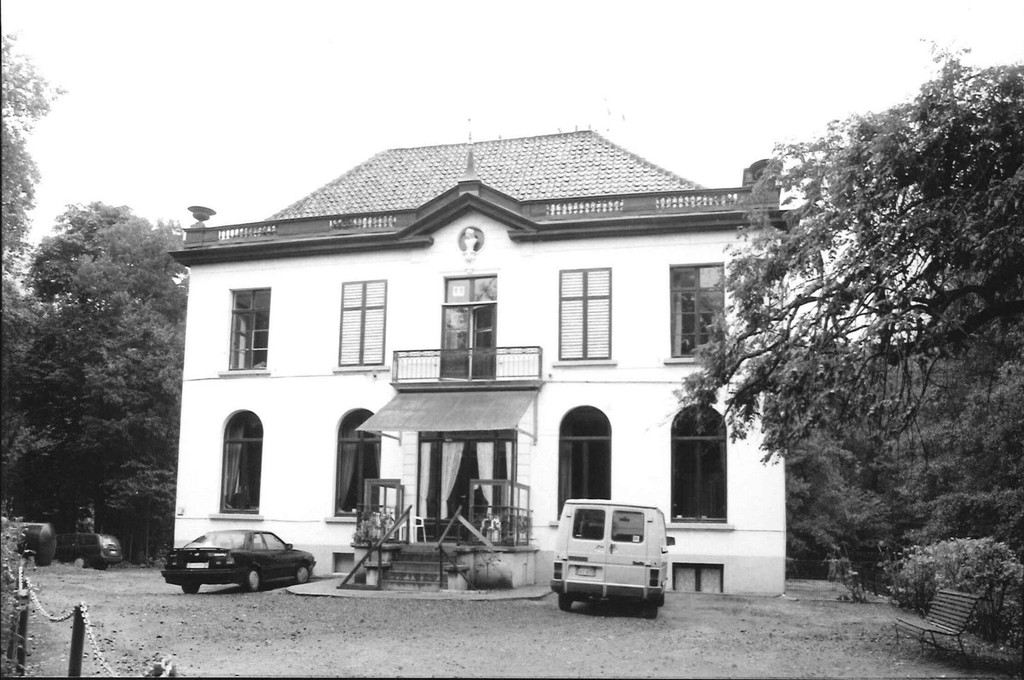

Site information
- Type: Castle

Location
- Coordinates: 51°02′09″N 3°47′45″E

Ocket Castle (Dutch: Kasteel Ocket) is a house, on the site of a castle, in Heusden, Destelbergen, East Flanders, Belgium. It probably originated on the former fief of Grooten Hoek that lasted until the 15th century. The castle was depicted on a 1725 map by PJ Benthuys as a building with a moat near the Scheldt and is mentioned in 1767 as a "partije genaemt den grieten hoeck met de mote ende huys van playsance". The present Neoclassical building dates largely from the 18th and 19th centuries but contains a dining room on the east side that in the 17th/18th century was the core of the structure, as was established among other things from the beams and the Rococo stucco decorations.

Both the building itself and the surrounding grounds have been listed as cultural heritage since 2009.
