= Heusden, Belgium =

Heusden
- Sub-municipality
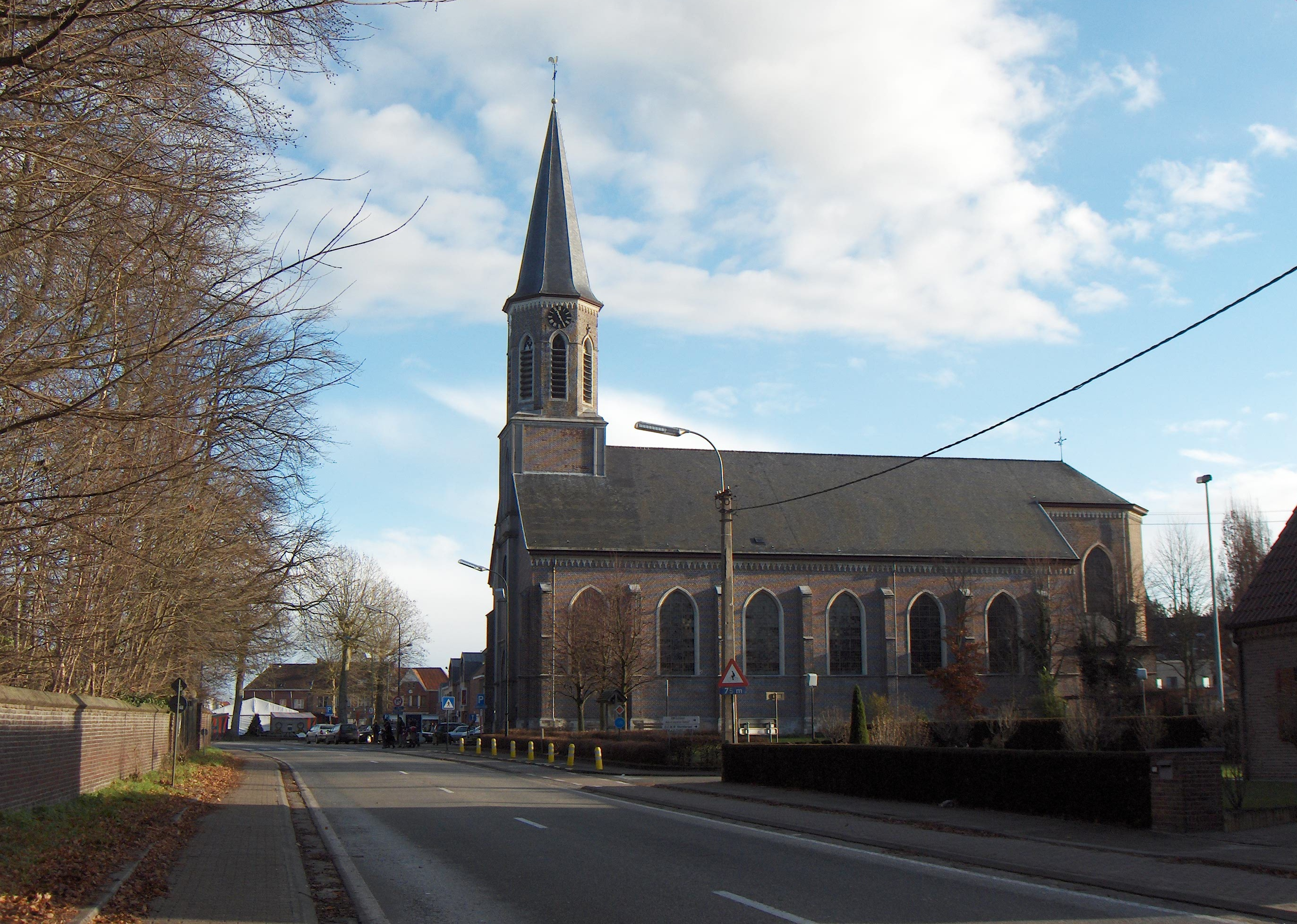
- Town center

- Coat of arms

- Location within Belgium
- Coordinates: 51°01′41″N 3°48′00″E
- Country: Belgium
- Municipality: Destelbergen
- Community: Flemish Community
- Region: Flemish Region
- Province: East Flanders

Area
  - Total: 14.13 km^{2} (5.46 sq mi)

Population (2021)
  - Total: 8,688
  - Density: 614.9/km^{2} (1,592/sq mi)
- Postal code: 9070

Heusden was a municipality located in the Belgian province of East Flanders. In 1977 it merged with the municipality of Destelbergen, of which it is now part.

It was mentioned for the first time in the 11th century, by abbot Othejbold. Years after the invasion by the Norsemen, the municipality fell into the hands of the Lords of Heusden. Because of the marriage of Beatrix of Heusden with Zeger III (viscount of Ghent) in 1212, the seat of the viscountship of Ghent moved to Heusden. Until the end of the Ancien Régime Heusden stayed property of the viscounts of Ghent. In 1247 the Cistercian Abbey of Nieuwenbosch settled in Heusden. This cloister flourished until it was destroyed by the Iconoclasts in 1578. After this the sisters moved to Ghent. Because Heusden was a part of the belt of defence around Ghent, it was looted many times during the Middle Ages.

This rich history has resulted in a number of castles dotting the area.

== Toponymy ==
According to one theory, the name Heusden derives from the personal name Kusidiniom.

Heusden was therefore named after "the area of Kusidinios".

The name Kusidinios could itself derive from the verb 'to hear'. Thus, Kusidinios was someone with good hearing.

Over the centuries, the name Kusidiniom would have been corrupted and reduced, until it finally became Heusden, as we know it today.

== History ==
The oldest mention of the village is when, in the 11th century, the Abbot Othejbold noted in a document that the place belonged to the Saint Bavo's Abbey before the Norman invasion. A little later it fall under the control of the lords of Heusden. After the marriage in 1212 of Beatrix van Heusden to Zeger III, the viscount of Ghent, the viscountcy of Ghent was transferred to Heusden. Until the end of the Ancien Régime, Heusden remained under the viscounts of Ghent.

The area was inhabited in the prehistoric Mesolithic period (ca. 10,000 to ca. 5000 BC), which was shown by research in both Destelbergen and Heusden.

Heusden is known for the Cistercian abbey of Nieuwenbosch, which was founded in 1247. The monastery was well known. However, in 1578 it was destroyed by the iconoclasts and the monastery ceased to exist. The nuns of the monastery then moved to nearby Ghent. The only visible remaining structure on the Heusden site is the former abbey farm, now known as the Bosseveerhoeve (or hoeve Ten Bossche or hoeve Caenepeel).

An annual event in Heusden is the fairground race "Grand Prix Maurice Raes" popularly known as Heusden Koers or the "world championship of fairground races". It is attended by about 20,000 cycling-enthusiasts.

== Sights ==
- Holy Cross Church from 1844
- Former leasehold farm Bosseveerhoeve of hoeve Ten Bossche of the disappeared Nieuwenbosch Abbey (1247-1579) on the Scheldt
- The Kalverbos nature reserve, with ancient Scheldt meanders, grasslands, old peat pits and farms, an important waterfowl area, marsh flora, etc.
- The numerous castles (e.g. Heusden Castle, Ocket Castle, Castle Stas de Richelle)
- The Harry Malter Family Park (Familiepark Harry Malter), leisure park and zoo

== Gallery ==
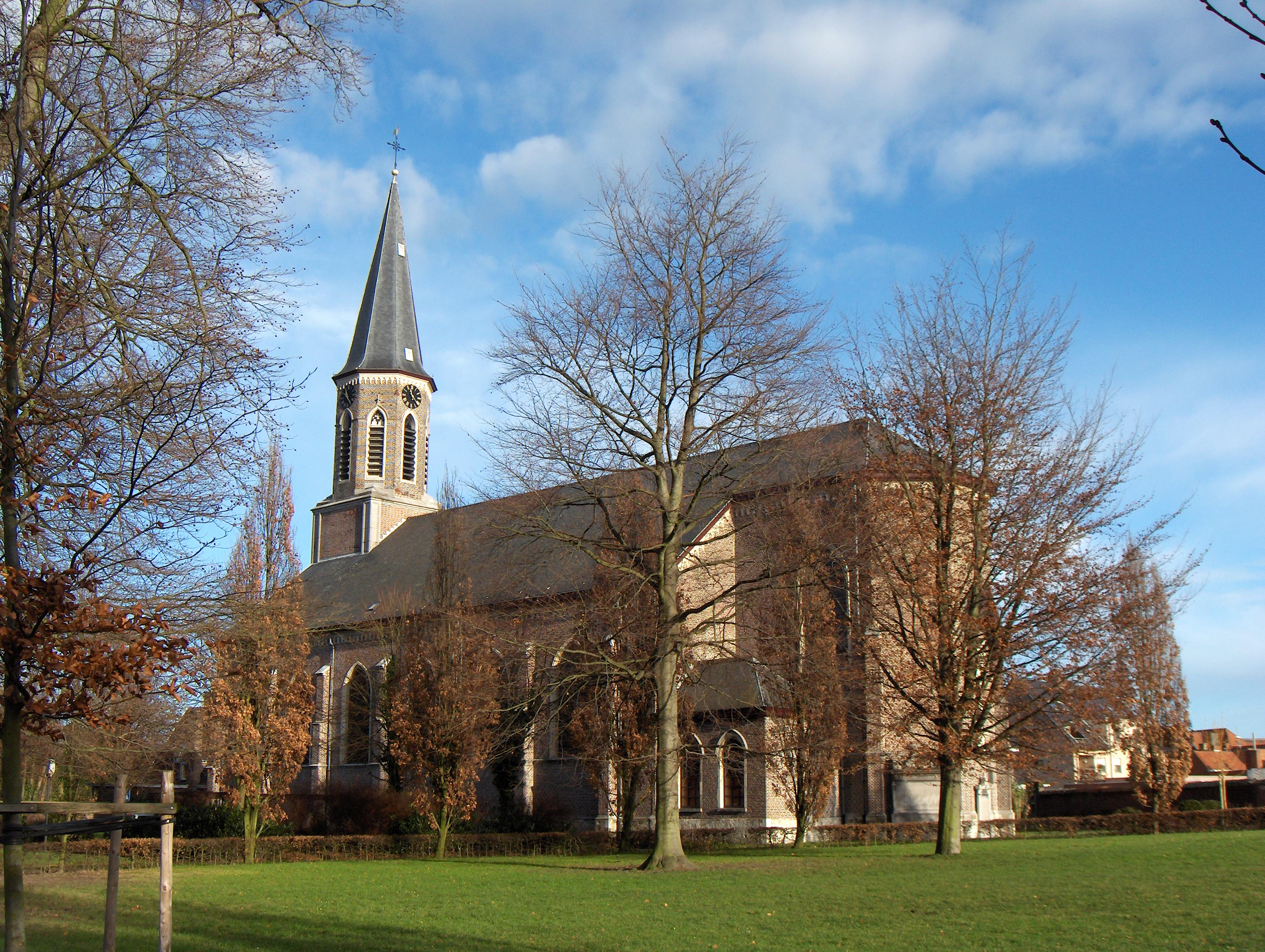
Holy Cross Church, 1844-1845 (neo-Gothic)

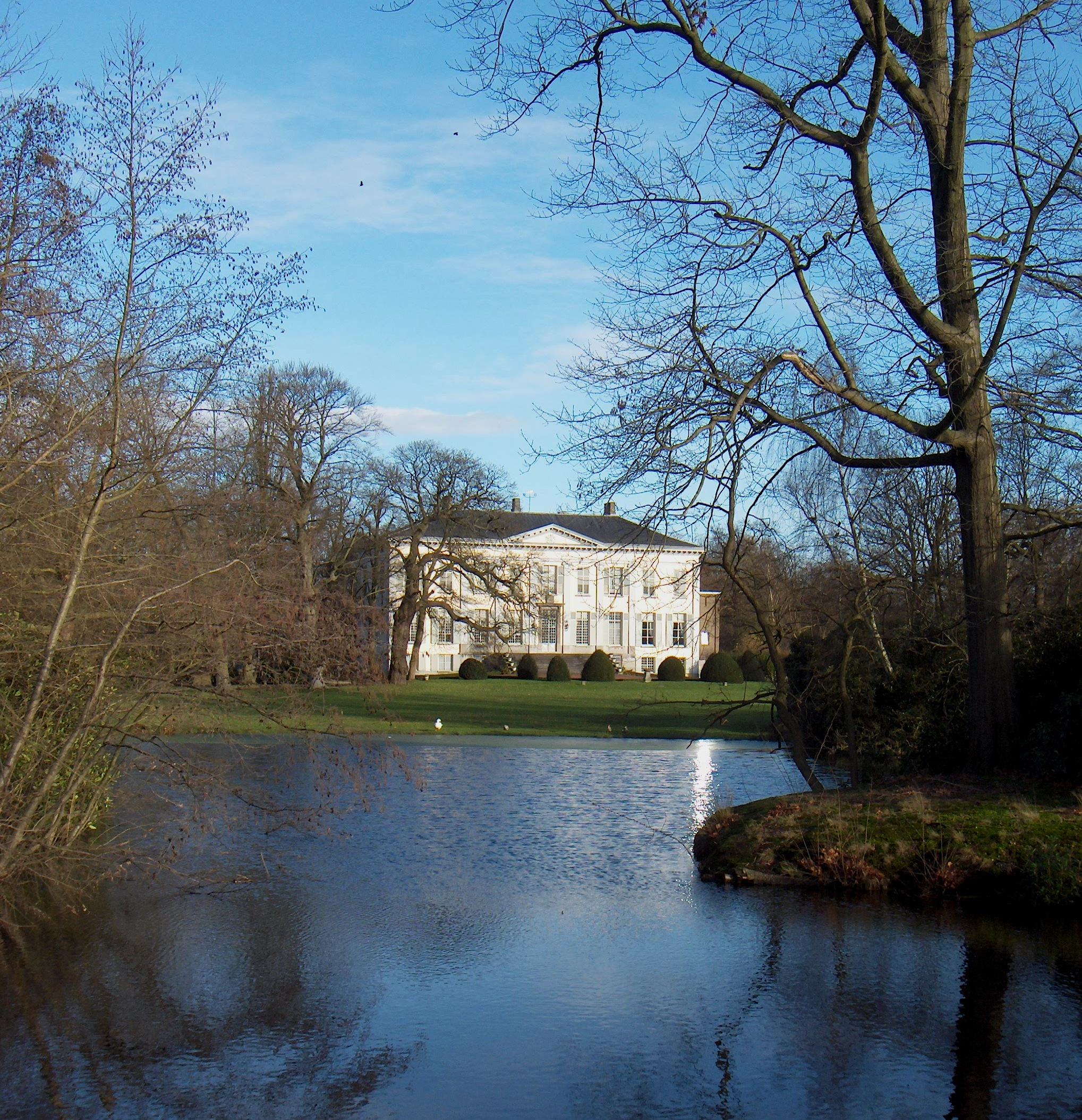
Castle Stas de Richelle (18th century)

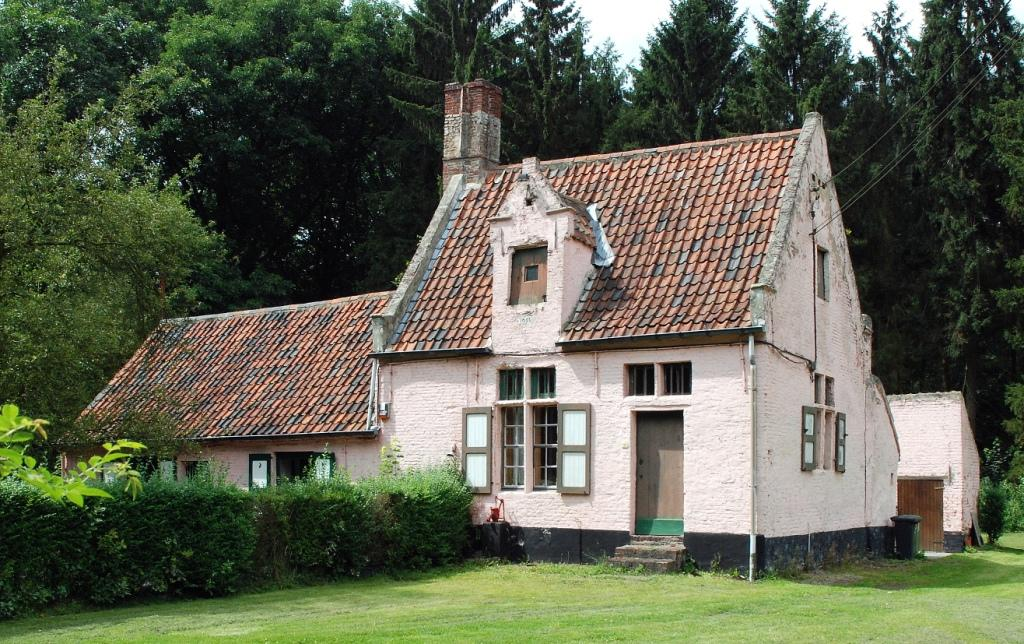
House from 1653

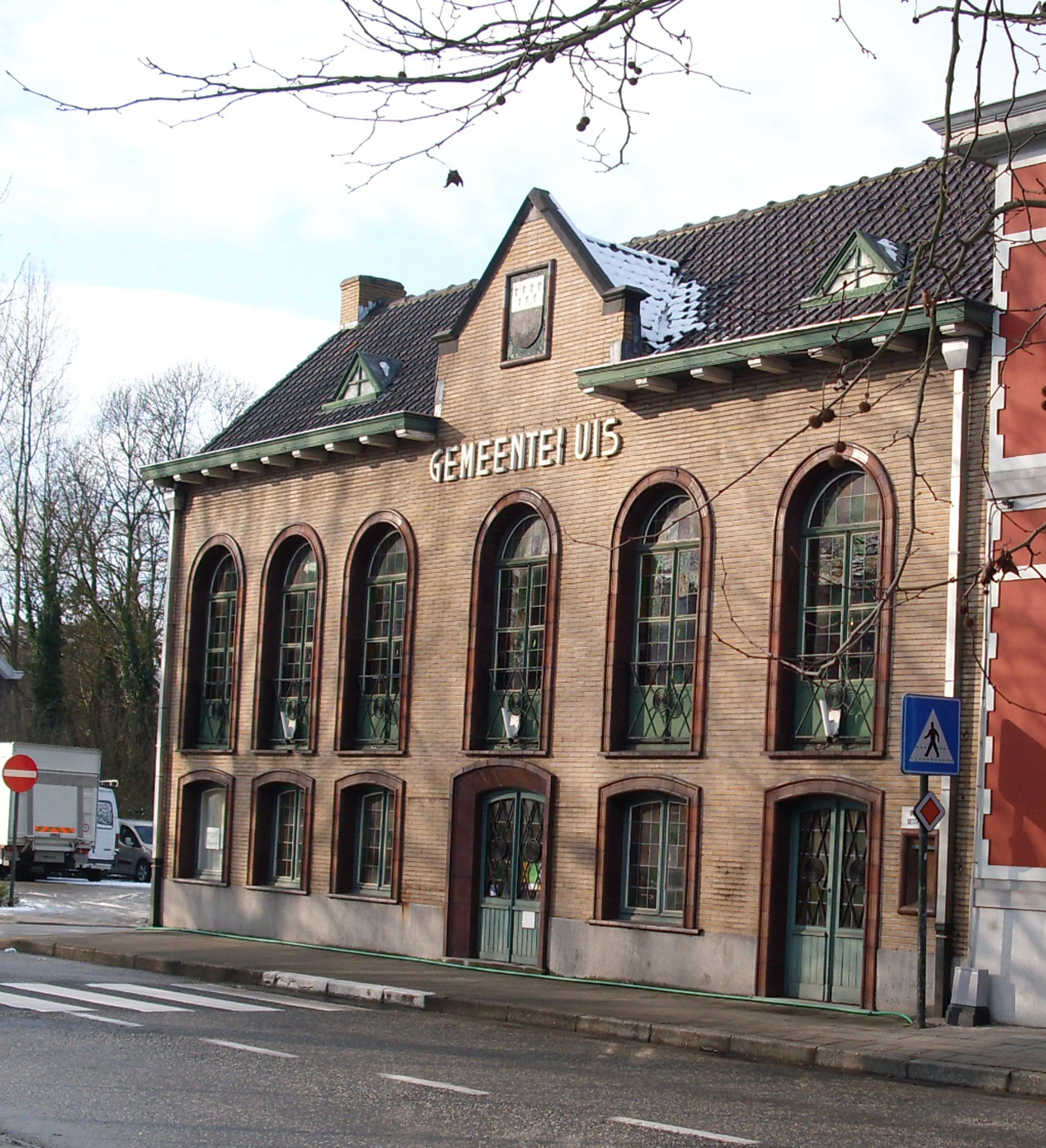
Former town hall

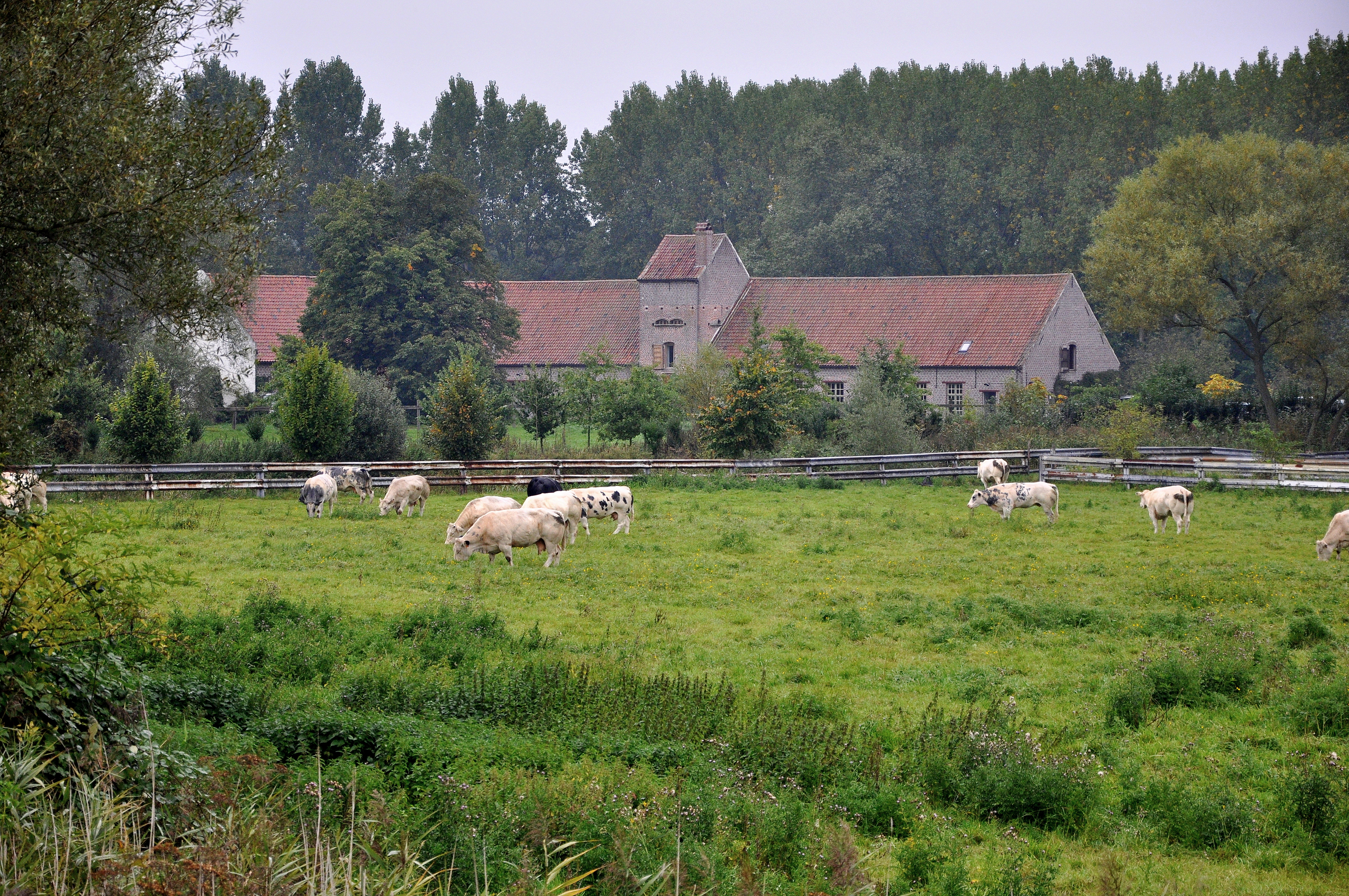
The Bosseveerhoeve of the former Nieuwenbosch Abbey

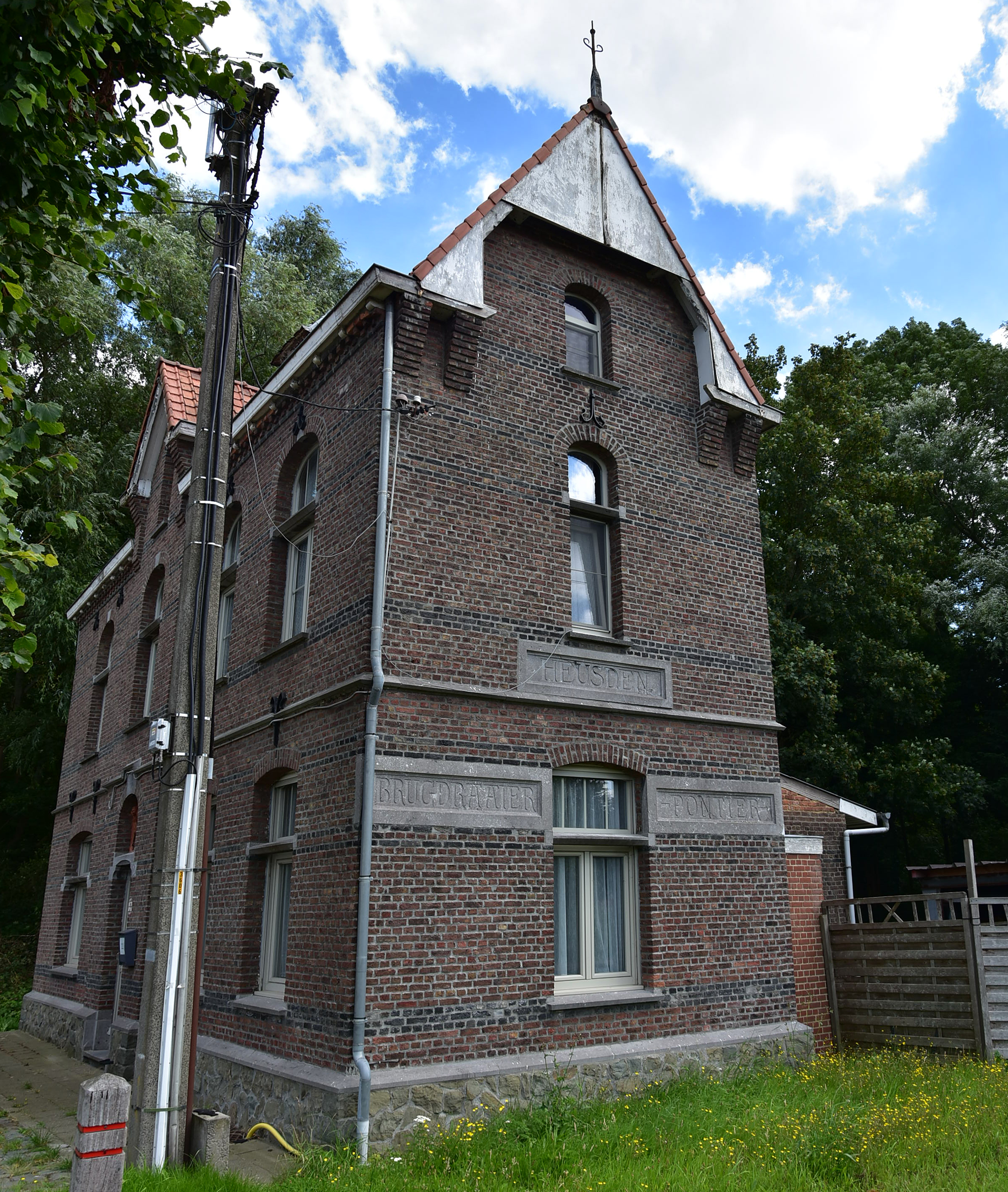
Brugdraaiershuis from 1909 on the Scheldetragel
