= Primula 'Zebra Blue' =

Ornamental plant cultivar

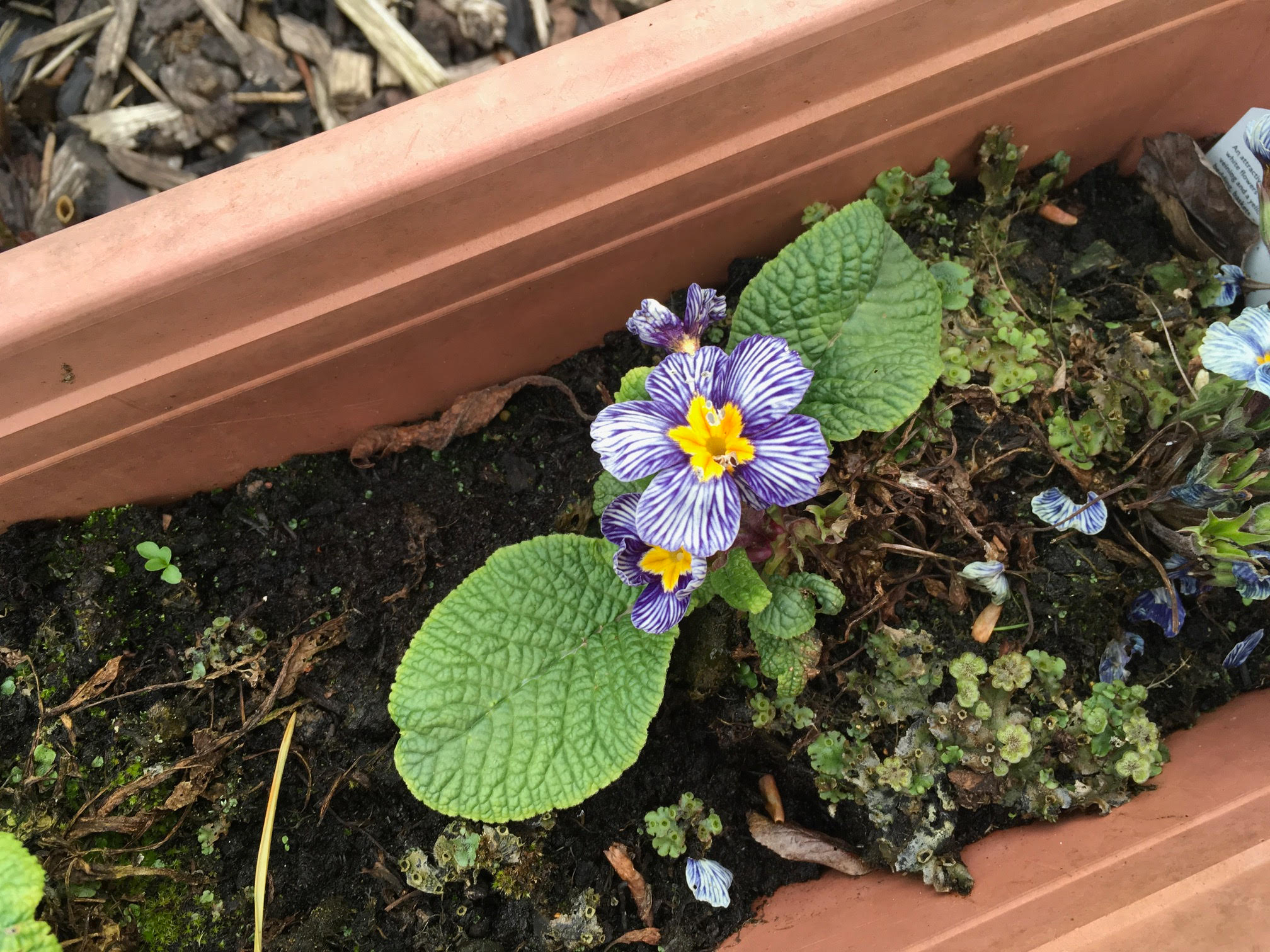
- Genus: Primula
- Hybrid parentage: Unknown
- Cultivar: 'Zebra Blue'
- Breeder: Stijn van Hoecke
- Origin: Destelbergen, Belgium

Primula 'Zebra Blue' is a cultivar of hybrid Primula, which was introduced in 2012. The cultivar was produced by plant breeder Stijn van Hoecke of the Belgian company Rudy Raes Bloemzaden nv.

== Description ==
Primula 'Zebra Blue' is a compact perennial cultivar, which hosts a basal rosette of green leaves. Plants produce large blooms from late winter to late spring. Flowers possess white petals with striking blue veining and a yellow centre.

== Pests and diseases ==
Primula 'Zebra Blue' can be susceptible to many pest species such as: aphids, weevils, slugs, snails, leaf miners and red spider mites. It can also be prone to diseases such as primula leaf spot, primula brown core and grey moulds.
