= Beatrix of Heusden =

Flemish viscountess

Beatrix van Heusden (? — after 1232) was a Flemish viscountess. She was the daughter of Hughes of Heusden, son of Anselm III, Lord of Heusden (not to be confused with his cousin, Hughes of Heusden, son of Anselm's brother Eustace, Lord of Choques).

Beatrix married Zeger III, the son of Zeger II and Petronella van Kortrijk. Through his marriage to her, Zeger became Lord of Heusden, and the title was held by his son and progeny.

Beatrix was also Viscountess of Ghent, as her husband was Chatelain of Ghent since 1200.

Beatrix and Zeger resided in Heusden Castle. Thanks to Beatrix's marriage to Zeger the castle increased in importance and became the seat of the Viscounty of Ghent.

Beatrix and Zeger had many children:

- Hugh I of Ghent, lord of Heusden, Bornhem, and Saint-Jean Steene and Chatelain of Ghent, married Odette of Champagne.
- Ziger of Ghent, married in 1235 to Ode of Grimberghen
- Gerard of Ghent, called the devil, married Elisabeth of Slote
- Walter of Ghent, archdeacon at the church of Arras
- William of Ghent called the Frisian
- Ferdinand of Ghent
- Bernard of Ghent, called of Meren, married Margueritte of Wervy
