= Bazel =

- Village
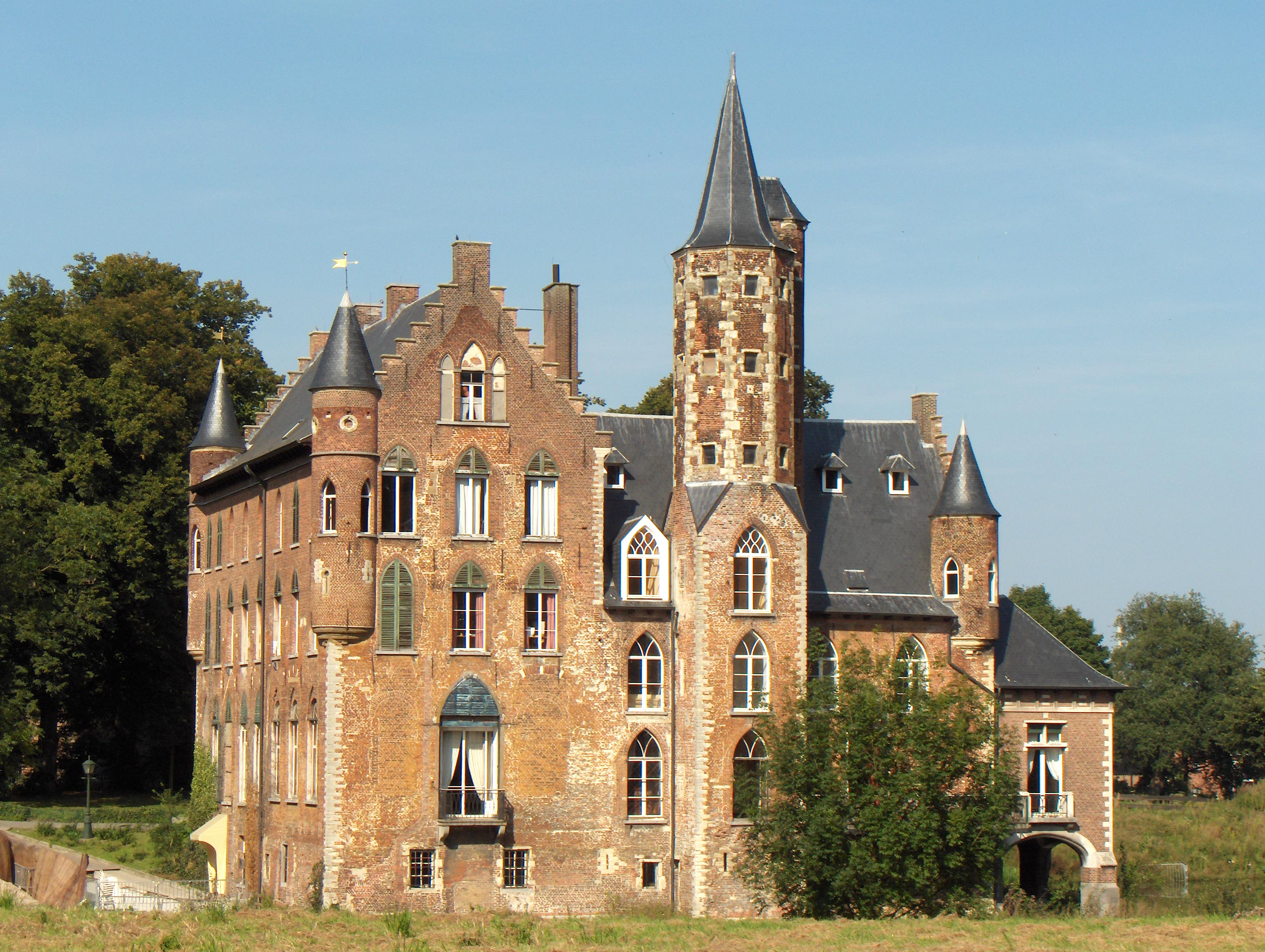
- Bazel, feudal castle of Wissekerke (oldest part 15th century, mainly 19th neogothic)

- Location in Belgium
- Coordinates: 51°09′N 4°18′E
- Country: Belgium
- Region: Flemish Region
- Province: East Flanders
- Municipality: Kruibeke

Area
  - Total: 16.95 km^{2} (6.54 sq mi)

Population (2021)
  - Total: 5,653
  - Density: 333.5/km^{2} (863.8/sq mi)
- Time zone: CET

Bazel is a village in Belgium, in the municipality of Kruibeke in the province of East Flanders. The village is home to the Wissekerke Castle. The municipality of Bazel merged into Kruibeke in 1977.

== Overview ==
The parish church was founded in the early 10th century. The village was located on the medieval road from Lille to Antwerp. From 1640, the village started develop.

The Wissekerke Castle is located in the village. The castle originates from the 10th century, however it burnt down, and was rebuilt in the 15th century. For two centuries, it was owned by the Vilain XIIII family, who remodelled the castle in neo-Gothic style. The suspension bridge was constructed in 1824 and is one of the oldest suspension bridges in Belgium.

In 1977, Bazel ceased to be an independent municipality and was merged into Kruibeke.

In 2004, Bazel was the host for the second episode of Fata Morgana, the TV-show in which Belgian celebrities gave a city or town several challenges.
