= Vilain XIIII =

Belgian noble family

- noble family
- Coat of Arms
- Country: Belgium

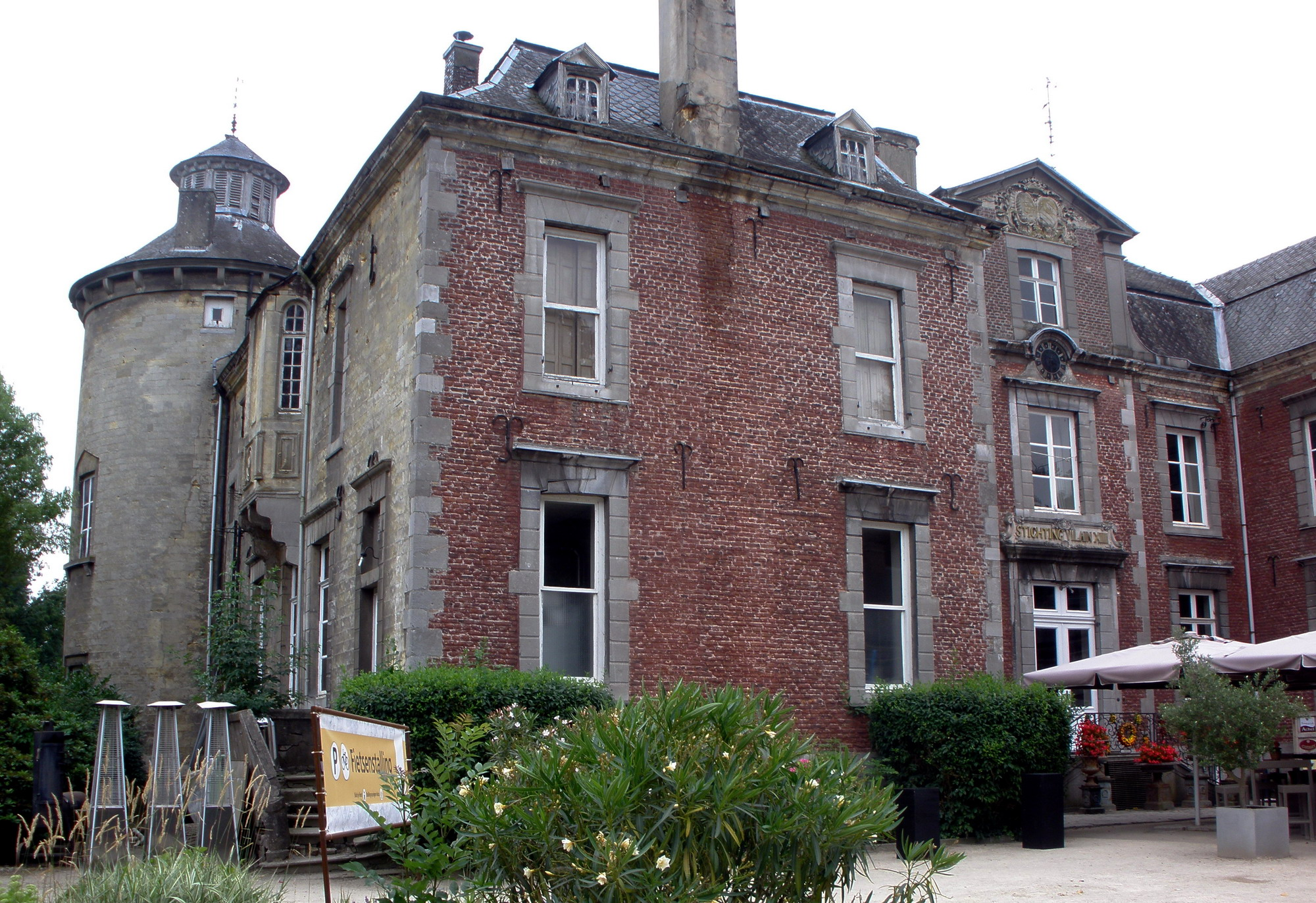
Chateau Vilain XIIII in Leut

Vilain and Vilain XIIII (pronounced Vilain-Quatorze [vilɛ̃ katɔʁz], sometimes written with the more standard Roman numerals Vilain XIV) is a Belgian noble family. Their coat of arms is basically "Sable, on a chief argent a label of the field" (French: De sable, au chef d'argent chargé d'un lambel du champ), a colour scheme that is present from the earliest Vilains in the 15th century, and is also seen in the Vilain XIIII arms, which have the "XIIII" added to it.

They were descendants of the important medieval family of Vilain in Ghent; the name "Vilain XIIII" probably comes from the coat of arms of Philippe de Liedekercke, chamberlain of emperor Charles V, who had 16 quarters in his coat, the fourteenth (bottom row, second from the left) of which was the coat of Vilain.

The three main branches of the family were the Princes of Issenghien (the De Gand, dite Vilain branch), the Counts of Aalst (the Vilain XIIII branch), and the Counts of Guines (originally also De Gand dite Vilain, later Vander Steene).

One branch lived at the Chateau of Leut (or Leuth) from 1822 until 1922, when the last of 7 daughters of Vicomte Charles Vilain XIIII died. The oldest mentions of "Villain XIIII" date back to the 16th century, but its origin is unknown. Politically, they were usually part of either the Catholic parties, or the Liberal parties. The first known generations were politicians (often bailiff or mayor) in Geraardsbergen and Aalst; the family also owned the county of Wetteren until 1796, and the city coat of arms still bears the XIIII of the family.

== Origin of name ==
The family name is pronounced vilain quatorze, and written 'XIIII' and not, in the conventional style, 'XIV'. There are various theories as to why this is (according to Frans van Kalken). The intention was probably to distinguish two branches of the family – according to Piet Lenders, between a younger and an older branch of the Vilains. Van Kalken says that the 'XIIII' goes back to a certain Josse Vilain, a bastard son of Philippe Vilain, when his natural father gave him 14 acres of land. The suffix thus distinguished the illegitimate from the legitimate branch of the family.

== Origins of family ==
Old sources claim an origin for the family going back to the time of Emperor Otto I. Whether there is any basis for this or whether this is a mystification is unclear. The origin and tree given there are as follows (always from father to son):

- Wichmannus, brother of Herimannus, both of the house of Saxe; Wichmann was created Count of Ghent in 949 by Otto I; he married Luitgarde, daughter of Arnulf I, Count of Flanders (she is said to have married Wichmann IV, count of Hamaland, so probably some confusion already exists here)
- Theodoric (ca 977), count of Ghent, married Hildegarde, daughter of Dirk III, Count of Holland
- Arnulf, Count of Ghent, married Lietgarde of Cleves
- Adelbert of Ghent, first of the Counts of Aalst
- Theodoric, Count of Ghent, circa 1018; married the daughter of the Count of Luzignan
- Lambert I, died 1053-1054; he is no longer listed as Count of Ghent but as Castellan of Ghent, as are his descendants
- Folcardus (died 1073), married Landrade, daughter of Balderic, Count of Leuven
- Lambert II, died 1088
- Wennemar, Lord of Bornem, died 1138; married Gillette de Guines, daughter of Count Baldwin
- Arnold, Count of Guines (inherited the title via his mother)
- Siger of Ghent and Guines, Lord of Bornem
- Siger II the Good, Lord of Bornem, Sint-Jans-Steene and Houdain; regent of Flanders (together with Jean de Neele) ca. 1210, during the reign of Joan, Countess of Flanders; died ca. 1227; married Lady Beatrix of Houdain

=== From here on the tree seems to be confirmed by written sources ===
- Hugues, castellan of Ghent, lord of Bornem, Sint-Jans-Steene and Houdain; married Ode de Champagne; the title of Castellan of Ghent did not go to Gauthier but to his other son, Hugues II
- Gauthier de Gand, dit Vilain (supposedly the first to have that title, oldest source for this is said to date from 1254); lord of Sint-Jans-Steene, married Avezoete van Maelstede
- Alexandre de Gand, dit Vilain, died ca. 1280; married Isabeau d'Axele; three children. Supposed to be mentioned as the Lord of Sint-Jans-Steene in 1262, and also lord of Kruibeke
- Gauthier de Gand, dit Vilain, II, Lord of Sint-Jans-Steene, married Adelize de Tamize; died before 1306: their children all died without issue, ending this branch
- Jourdain de Gand, dit Vilain, second son of Alexandre, succeeded Gauthier II after his death: mentioned in 1299
- Gauthier de Gand, dit Vilain, III, Lord of Sint-Jans-Steene and Boekhoute, married ca. 1330, died ca. 1339; he had two sons, Jean and Hector
- Jean de Gand, dit Vilain, Lord of Boekhoute, and Sint-Jans-Steene, married Marie de Maelstede and afterwards Claire de Mirabelle; still alive in 1365
- Jean de Gand, dit Vilain, II, lord of Sint-Jans-Steene and the "4 Ambachten" (Hulst, Axel, Assenede and Boekhoute), Counsellor and Knight of the Count of Flanders (circa 1359-1385); married in 1359 Marguerite Brisetête; died before 1397
- Jean de Gand, dit Vilain, III, lord of Sint-Jans-Steene, Huisse and the 4 Ambachten, Knight and Chamberlain of Philips I of Burgundy; married Marguerite de Grave dit de Liedekercke, lady of Liedekercke and Rassenghien; we move to the established and accepted parts of the tree of De Gand dite Vilain here (or perhaps with a few of the ones directly before). The family were knights and lived at Temse (Tamize) at the time.
- Jean de Gand dit Vilain, died 8 July 1449, Lord of Huisse/Huise/Huyse, Pamel, Leeberghe (Ledeberg), Borcht (Burcht) and Zwijndrecht, married to Goenele Raes;

Branch of Hugues II, son of Hugues (from the same non-trustworthy old sources):

- Hugues II, Castellan of Ghent, married ca. 1241 Marie de Gavre; died ca. 1265
- Hugues III, Castellan of Ghent, married Marie de Reux, died in or after 1303; they only had daughters
- Marie, eldest daughter of Hugues III; Castellan of Ghent, Lady of Soudain and Sottenghien, married Gérard de Sottenghien; through this marriage, the Castellany of Ghent goes to the Melun family
- Hector Vilain was Knight in Temse and Castellan of Rupelmonde in 1327. Whether he was the "Hector", son of Gauthier III, is unclear. He was married to Marie van Liedekercke (in or before 1331) and lived in our near Temse.
- Jan Vilain was said to have been Castellan of Rupelmonde as well, and murdered there; he was also a lord of Sint-Jans-Steene; whether he was the same as Jourdain is unclear.
- Philip Vilain was supposed to be a brother of Hector, and Castellan of Rupelmonde in 1337.
- Henri Vilain was one of the signatories of the 1339 treaty of Peace and Alliance between the cities of Flandres, Hainaut and Brabant.

== Vilain XIIII (the Aalst branch) ==
- Henri Vilain XIIII, Mayor of Aalst, died 21 December 1607, married Barbe Vander Sare
  - Jean Vilain XIIII, Lord of Dumple, Lieutenant-Grand-Bailiff of the Land of Aalst; Married Ester della Faille
    - Jean-François Vilain XIIII, lord of Dumple (or Dumpel), mayor of Aalst; married Catherine Houtman
      - François-Ignace Vilain XIII (died 1740), Lord of Welle and Idderghem, receiver-general of the land of Aalst; married Barbe de Berlaere (1674-1704; daughter Anne-Pétronille Vilain de Welle, married François-Romain van 'tSestich, Lord of Ophem and Winksel, mayor of Mechelen) and then Isabelle-Josèphe Vandermeere
        - Charles-Ignace (or Charles-François Joseph, )Vilain XIIII, eldest son of François-Ignace and Isabelle-Josèphe; Lord of Welle, Receiver-general of the Land of Aalst; married Isabelle du Bois (died 1753), daughter of Josse du Bois, Lord of Schoondorp
          - Isabelle Marie Josèphe Vilain XIIII, married Charles Raymond Baillet, Baron of Geves and Viscount of Merlemont, in 1762; died in or shortly before 1832, when there is a sale of books from the heritage of the widow Countess de Baillet.
          - Françoise Jeanne Josèphe Vilain XIIII, married Count Jean Baptiste Cyprien de Lauretan, of Bavikhove
        - Marie Vilain XIIII, married Baron Dons, Lord of Lovendegem
        - Viscount Jean-Jacques-Philippe Vilain XIIII (1 May 1712 – 15 August 1777); Born in Aalst as second son of François-Ignace; received his MA in Civil and Canonical Law from Leuven in 1733. Married Constance de Lunden d'Anvers (died 1748). Mayor of Aalst (city and Land of Aalst) until 1751, when he moved to Ghent; second marriage with Marie Dubois de Schoondorp; Premier echevin (first schepen, in those days equivalent to Mayor) of the Keure of Gand from 1755-1759, and from 1761-1774. First Member of the States of Flanders. In 1774 Grand Bailiff of Ghent and the castellany of Oudburg. In 1771 made a Knight in the Royal and Religious Order of Saint Etienne by the Austrian empress, who also made him a State Councillor. Organised the prison of Ghent in 1771. Died in his castle in Wetteren. Author of Réflexions sur les finances de la Flandre, 1755, or Verhael ende reflexien op de verbreydinge der besmettelyke siekte in het hoorn-vee (1769), and of Memoire sur les moyens de corriger les malfaiseurs et fainéants à leur propre avantage et de les rendre utiles à l'état (1775, reprinted 1841)
          - Philippe-Mathieu Vilain XIIII, (3 December 1753 - 20 December 1810), Grand Bailiff of Ghent from 1778 on, son of Jean-Jacques-Philippe. Married in 1777 Anne Thérèse Colette de Ghellink de Poteghem, daughter of Louis Charles de Ghellinck, Lord of Poteghem, Coeyeghem, ... Through the Ghellinck family, he became Count of Rupelmonde
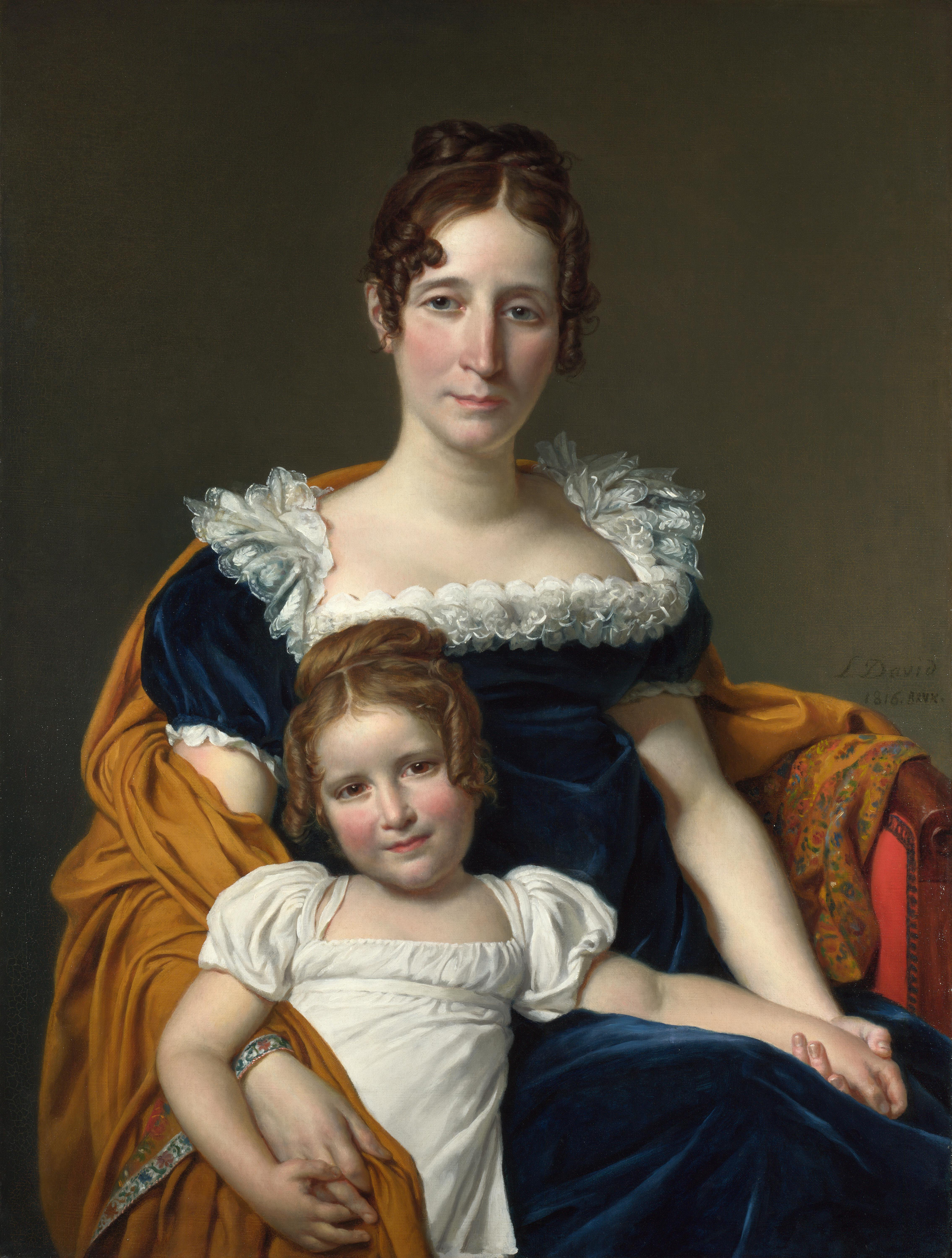
            - Portrait of countess Sophie Vilain XIIII and her daughter, by Jacques-Louis David, 1816
              Count Philippe-Louis Marie Ghislain Vilain XIIII (1778-1856), born in Ghent, married to Baroness Sophie de Felz in 1802; rich industrialist and property owner. He was the mayor of Bazel (from 1800 until 1856), and mayor of Rupelmonde (between 1812 and 1836), but moved to Paris and became a chamberlain of Napoleon, who made him a Count in 1811. They had their portraits made by Edme Quenedey des Ricets, and Sophie was painted by Jacques-Louis David in 1816. After Belgium became a part of the Netherlands, Philippe-Louis became a chamberlain of King Willem I and a member of the Staten-Generaal and the Second Chamber. From 1828 on, he joined the Belgian opposition of rich Catholics against Willem I and the Dutch rule of Belgium; he was a member of the Nationaal Congres, and became a Senator for Kortrijk (1831-1847) and Sint-Niklaas (1847-1851). Sophie de Felz became a lady-in-waiting to the French empress and later to the first Belgian queen. The family lived at the Wissekerke Castle, in Basel.
              - Viscount Charles Ghislain Guillaume Vilain XIIII (5 May 1803 – 1878), minister of State for Belgium, eldest son of Philippe-Louis. Born in Brussels. Studied at the Lyceum of Brussels, the Charlemagne college in Paris, and the Jesuit college in Saint-Acheul. Started studying Law in Liège in 1821, but dropped out of school and married Baroness Pauline de Billehé de Valensart in 1822. They had seven children, all daughters. The marriage gave him the castle of Leut, in Maasmechelen, which became the new family home until the last of his daughters died in 1922; it is now the retirement home Vilain XIIII. Member of the Staten-Generaal. Joined the opposition against Willem I in 1828, but influenced by the writings of Hugues Felicité Robert de Lamennais, he had more progressive ideas than his father. Refused the function of Governor of Limburg in 1830. Member of the Nationaal Congres. Secretary of the central bureau of the Congres, which wrote the new Constitution. Read the Belgian Constitution at the Oath of the first king, Leopold I. Was elected as a Representative (MP) in 1831 for Sint-Niklaas, and reelected in 1832, 1833, 1834 and 1835. Was sent to the Vatican and some Italian kingdoms as a special emissary in 1832, a mission which was largely a failure, and which was rensponsible for Charles' move away from progressive ideas towards more reactionary and anti-democratic principles. Became governor of East Flanders in September 1834, succeeding Werner de Lamberts-Cortenbach. Remained Governor until the end of August 1836. At the end of 1835, he again became a special emissary to the Vatican and the Italian States; this mission lasted until 1839 and was a success. Due to his frequent absences, he didn't stand in the 1836 elections for MP. After the end of his mission in Italy, he again was a candidate MP for Sint-Niklaas, and became the MP from 1839 until 1848. He was the vice-president of the Chamber of Electives from 1843 until 1847. In 1848, he switched from Sint-Niklaas to Maaseik (where his family castle was located), and became MP for Maaseik from 1848 until his death in 1878. He was president of the chamber between 1855 and 1858. He was mayor of Leut from 1842 until 1878. He was a candidate for Governor of Antwerp in 1844, but didn't get the position. In 1855, he became Minister of Foreign Affairs in the Pierre de Decker government, until the end of that cabinet in 1857. From 1870 until 1875 he was again elected President of the Chamber of Representatives, and in 1875 he received the honorary title of Minister of State.
              - Emma Fredericque Elisabeth Vilain XIIII (born 1815/1816 - died 25 July 1864) married Prosper Joseph de Kerchove de Denterghem, member of the house of representatives; the Castle of Bazel went to this family; they had 8 children, their daughter Maria again marrying into the family to Stanislas Vilain XIIII
          - Countess Isabelle Marie Colette Ghislaine Vilain XIIII (22 February 1755 - 4 January 1827) married viscount Theodore Jean Joseph Ghislain de Jonghe, Lord of Ardooie, Strathem and Duwaerde
          - Two further children; Marie-Sophie (1757), and Charles (1759)
        - Anne Vilain XIIII, married Rodriguez de Evora y Vega, lord of Moorsel
      - Anne-Françoise Vilain, sister of François-Ignace; married to Michel de Crane, Lord of Wingaerde (his fourth wife!)
  - Marguerite Vilain married Frédéric Sanders; no issue
  - Anne Vilain, died 1630 (buried in the Family grave in the Saint Marin in Aalst); married Roland Sanders, mayor of Vrasene and Sint-Gillis, before 1594; they had a daughter, Jeanne Sanders
  - Viscount Alfred Vilain XIIII (1810-1886), younger brother of Charles Vilain XIIII, whom he succeeded as head of the family; member of the provincial council (Provincieraad) of East Flanders from 1836 until at least 1864; Senator ca. 1864; Mayor of Basel ca. 1864; married Antoinette Adelaïde d'Espiennes
    - Viscount Stanislas Vilain XIIII (1838-1926), member of the provincial council of East-Flanders between 1864 and 1886, co-founder of the Agricultural Institute of the University of Leuven; married Maria de Kerchove de Denterghem (born 1838), daughter of Prosper Joseph de Kerchove de Denterghem and Emma Fredericque Elisabeth Vilain XIIII
    - J. L. H. Gustave de Schiervel, son-in-law of Charles Vilain XIIII, nephew of Baron Louis de Schiervel, governor of Limburg; after the dead of his uncle, he became the new Baron de Schiervel.
- Viscount (later Count) Charles-Hippolyte A.G. Vilain XIIII born in Paris in 1796: died in Wetteren in 1873), nephew of Philippe-Louis, member of the Nationaal Congres; mayor of Wetteren from 1822 until 1873. Diplomat in Italy. 1841: marriage of Hippolyte (this one) to Baroness Sophie Dubois. Author of Mémoire sur les chaussées vicinales et sur les moyens d'en compléter le développement dans la province de la Flandre orientale (1829).
- A viscount Vilain XIIII was Belgian ambassador in Germany until 1999

== De Gand, dite Vilain ==
Without the XIIII, there was a family "Vilain de Gand":

Perhaps the earliest (no date, later than 1424) of these we find is Jean Vilain, lord of Sint-Jans-Steene, who married Marguerite de Grave dite de Liedekerke; their son Adrien Vilain was Lord of Sint-Jans-Steene and Baron of Assenede and married Jossine van Praet. Other sources already give this branch the "De Gand, dite Vilain" name, naming Adrien as Lord of St-Jans-Steene, Rassenghien, Liedekercke, Leeuwe (or Leeuw), Lombeke; he was a Counsellor and Chamberlain of Duke Jean I of Bourgogne. He died in 1449. Martin de Gand-Vilain is his son. Other sources list Jean de Gand dit Vilain, died 8 July 1449, Lord of Huisse/Huise/Huyse, Pamel, Leeberghe (Ledeberg), Borcht (Burcht) and Zwijndrecht, married to Goenele Raes; father of Jean de Gand dit Vilain (married Marguerite Gruuthuse) and Christophe de Gand dit Vilain (married Jeanne de Lannoy)

- Martin de Gand-Vilain (died 1465), knight, Lord of Rassenghien, Sint-Jans-Steene and Huisse, Counsellor of Philips the Good, married to Antoinette de Masmines, Lady of Kalken, Wetteren and Lichtervelde (which titles entered the Vilain family through her); in 1453, he was convicted of a felony, and the castle of Harques (near Temse, home of the family) was confiscated and given to Pierre Vasque de Savanedra instead, by Philips of Burgundy.; the castle and its dependencies in temse and surroundings returned to the hands of Vilain in 1456; but due to serious debts were sold in 1458 to the Saint Peter's Abbey in Ghent.
  - Adrien de Gand-Vilain (died 12 June 1490), Lord of Rassenghien and Hem, Counsellor and Chamberlain of Archduke Maximilian of Austria, married Marie de Cuinghien.
    - Adrien de Gand de Vilain (born 14 September 1490), Lord of Rassenghien, Sint-Jan-Steene, Kalken and Wetteren; vice-admiral of Flanders, married in 1525 Marguérite de Stavele, daughter of Jean de Stavele, Lord of Isenghien, Glayon, Chaumont, Haveskerke and Estaires (which titles entered the Vilain family through her heritage); died in 1532
      - Hélène Vilain de Gand, Lady of Estaires, married François de Montmorency, Baron of Wastynes, Lord of Bersée; lived ca. 1550
      - 1574-1577 (died 1583): Maximilien de Gand dit Vilain, Baron of Rassenghien, Governor of Lille, Douai and Orchies, Lord of Sint-Jans-Steene, Kalken, Lichtervelde, Wetteren, Isenghien, Sailly, Forest, Lomme and Hem; grand bailiff of Aalst and Geraardsbergen, State counsellor and Chef of the Finances of the Netherlands. He was made Count of Isenghien in 1582 by King Philips II; he married Philippine de Jauche, Lady of Masmines, in 1559. They had 10 children, 3 of which follow.
        - Jacques-Philippe de Gand dit Vilain (died 5 January 1628), count of Isenghien, Baron of Rassenghien, Sint-Jans-Steene, Seigneur de Mamines, married Odile de Claerhout (daughter of the Baron of Maldeghem; mother of 6 children, including Philippe Lamoral and Alberte, below), and after her death Isabeau de Berghes, daughter of Ferry de Berghes, Lord of Grimbergen (3 children, including Guillaume de Gand dit Vilain, below).
          - Philippe-Lamoral Vilain de Gand, count of Isenghien, Baron of Rassenghien, married Baroness Marguérite de Merode, Countess of Middelburg; knighted on 18 March 1618 by Archduke Albert/Albrecht; died 6 January 1631. Grand Bailiff of Aalst. Governor of Lille, Douai and Orchies in 1624.
            - Maximilien de Gand dit Vilain, eldest son of Philippe-Lamoral, Count of Issenghien, died in 1636.
            - Balthazar Philippe de Gand, dit Vilain, second son of Philippe-Lamoral, Count of Isenghien, Middelburg and Ognies, Viscount of Ypres, Baron of Rassenghien and Frentz, Lord of Glajon, Croifilles, Masmines, Charleroi, Lannoy, Waten, ...; in 1640, King Philips IV raised Masmines to a principality, making him Prince Balthazar Philippe de Gand dit Vilain; his descendants often drop the Vilain part of the name in favour of the Masmines and Isenghien parts. He became Governor of the Duchy of Gelderland and the County of Zutphen and Dean of the Knights of the Golden Fleece. In 1675, he married dona Louise Henriquez Sarmiento, daughter of the Count of Salvatierra He died on 27 February 1680, aged 63.
              - Jean Alphonse (or Alphonze) de Gand, dit Vilain (Brussels 13 July 1655 - 6 May (or July) 1687), Prince and Count of Isenghien and Masmines; Count of Middelburg, Ongnies, and Vianden; Viscount of Ypres, Wahagnies and Ledreghen; Baron of Frentz, Rassenghien, Croisilles and Glajon; Lord of Lannoy, Charleroy, Waten, ...: married to Marie-Thérèse de Crevant d'Humières, oldest daughter of Louis de Crevant, Duc d'humières, Pair and Marshal of France
                - Louis de Gand de Merode de Montmorency, dit Vilain (16 Juli 1678 - ?), Prince and Count of Isenghien and Masmines, Count of Middelburg, Merode, Ongnies and Vianden; Viscount of Ypres, Wahagnies, and Ledreghem; Baron of Frentz, Rassenghien, Croisilles, Glajon and Warneston; Lord of Lannoy, Waeten, Charleroi... Marshal of France, Governor of Arras, Knight in the Orders of the King, married first to Anne Marie Louise, princess of Furstemberg, second to marie-Louise Charlotte Pot-de-Rhodes, third to Marguerite Camille Grimaldi-de-Monaco
                - Alexandre Maximilien Balthazar de Gand, dit Vilain (second son of Jean Alphonse; died 2 January 1759), count of Middelburg, Marshal of the French Army, Governor of Bouchain, married in 1733 to Elisabeth Pauline de Roy de la Rochefoucauld; they had two daughters, below
                  - Elisabeth-Pauline de Gand de Merode de Montmorency, daughter of Alexandre Maximilien, born 20 August 1737, Princess of Issenghien and Masmines, Countess of Middelburg, married in 1755 to Louis-Leon Felicité de Brancas, Count of Lauraguais.
                  - Louise-Pauline de Gand de Merode de Montmorency (born 17 April 1747, died 16 September 1771), married in 1762 Louis Alexandre, Duke of Rochefoucauld and La Roche-Guyon, Pair of France.
              - Marie-Thérèse de Gand dite Vilain, daughter of Balthazar Philippe; married first François-Philippe de Melun, Marquis of Richebourg, and then Count Jean-Dominique of Maldegem
            - Adrien-Joseph-Victor Vilain de Gand, son of Philippe-Lamoral
            - Isabelle-Claire de Gand, dite Vilain; married Philippe Emmanuel Antoine Ambroise de Croy, Count of Sorle, Knight of the Golden Fleece, died in 1670
          - Alberte de Gand dit Vilain, daughter of Jacques-Philippe, died 4 July 1637; married on 14 October 1619 Philippe de Mailly, Viscount of Eps, Marquis of Quesnoy
          - Guillaume de Gand, son of Jacques-Philippe, Baron of Sint-Jans-Steene, died in 1637; married Baroness Louise de Merode
            - Guillaume-Ernest de Gand (died 12 September 1694 in Oudenaarde), Count of Liberchies
              - Philippe-Ernest de Gand, died without issue
        - Gilbert de Gand dit Vilain (after 1583), third son of Maximilien, Lord of Hem, Lomme and Sailly, Knight in the Order of Saint-Jacques, Governor of Renty. Married Marie-Françoise de Wissocq.
          - Gilbert de Gand, Knight in the Order of Calatrava
          - Jacques (or Jacques-Philippe) de Gand dit Vilain, became Marquis of Hem (raised to Marquisat in 1660); married Michelle de Varennes, Lady of Saint-Leger
            - Philippote Françoise de Gand-Vilain, married Michel-François de Varennes, Lord of Houplin and Beaumanoir
            - François-Gilbert de Gand, Marquis of Hem, married Marie-Anne de Lannoy, Lady of Eplechin
              - N. De Gand, Marquis of Hem, died before 1716, no issue
              - Michel-Maximilien de Gand, Marquis of Hem after the death of his brother, no issue
            - Viscount Jacques de Gand, married Isabelle de Thiennes, Lady of Ardelois
              - Count François-Dominique de Gand, General-Major and Governor of Ostend; married Marie-Bonne l'Allemand
                - Count Jean-Guillaume de Gand; Marquis of Hem, Lord of Forest and Sailly; married to Louise Angelique de Fossez, Viscountess of Bouy and Annizis
                - Count Charles de Gand, page to the Archduchess Marie-Elisabeth in Brussels
        - Maximilien de Gand dit Vilain II, fifth son of Maximilien: Bishop of Tournai
- Colard de Gand-Vilain, brother of Martin; received the titles of Lord of Liedekercke and Lombeke and St-Amands-Baasrode; died between 1459 and 1463.
  - Adrien de Gand-Vilain, Lord of Liedekercke
  - Colard de Gand-Vilain, Count of Lombeke, Viscount of Denderleeuw, married in 1509 Zoete Vanden Steen, last descendant of the rich family Vanden Steen
    - Jérôme de Gand-Vilain Vanden Steen
      - Erasme de Gand-Vilain, dit Vanden Steen, Viscount of Denderleeuw, married Barbe Vanden Eeckhaute-Grimberge
        - Nicolas de Gand-Vilain, dit Vanden Steen, viscount of Denderleeuw, married Jossine de Wal-Hornes
          - Amand Vanden Steen, Viscount of Denderleeuw, ca. 1550; married Elisabeth von Eerwecht
            - Jean Vanden Steen, viscount of Denderleeuw and Saivre

The family Vanden Steen kept the quarter of Gand-Vilain in their weapon, but dropped the name.

        - Corneille Vanden Steen, first of the Barons Vanden Steen de Wagerstein et Ommerenstein, in Gelderland and Frisia
- Adrien-Honoré de Gand, uncle of Guillaume-Ernest de Gand, succeeds him as Count of Librechies, was Chauncellor of Tournai
- André-Lamoral de Gand (died 13 January 1705), Count of Librechies, Viscount of Audrignies, Baron of Sint-Jans-Steene, governor of Ath, brother of Adrien-Honoré, succeeds him as Count of Librechies; married Valerie de Schyngen, daughter of Corneille-Adrien de Schyngen, lord of Singelbaenst
  - N. De Gand, Count of Librechies, Baron of Steene, died 11 July 1708 (Battle of Oudenaarde)
  - Marie Isabelle Ernestine de Gand, dite Vilain (married before 1736), countess of Liberchies: married first to Alexandre-George du Faing, count of Hasselt an Baon of Jamiegne, and second to Frédéric François Hubert Volckaert, Lord of Spiegelhove, Salardinge (Zarlardinge?), ... grand bailiff of the Land van Waas, Count of Welden

=== Unclear which branch ===
- 1599-1622: Jonkheer Franchoys de Vilain, echevin in Ghent; 1623-1630 Ontvanger in Ghent
  - 1621: Franchoys van Gent ende Vilain, Baenderheere (?) van Rassenghien
  - 1633-1640: Frans/Franchoys van Ghent, gheseyt (=dite) Vilain, Baron van Resseghen (= Rassenghien), van Borsbeke, Lord of Oordegem, ...
- 1616: Hughes de Vilain, Ontvanger (receiver) in Ghent
- 1634-1635; 1645-1649: Jonkheer Jan Vilain (echevin in Ghent)
  - 1657-1663: Jan Vilain, Lord of Werue
- 1636; 1653: Jonkheer Christoffels Vilain, Lord of Vergier (echevin in Ghent)
- 1678-1690: Guillaume Vilain, Lord of Dumpele (=Dumpel or Dumple); Jean-Guillaume Vilain, lord of Dumple, echevin of de Keure in 1689-1690; married Jeanne-Barbe Thierens; she was the daughter of Philippe-Lamoral Thierens ("haut-echevin" of the Land van Waas), who married Françoise Vilain, daughter of François Vilain and Barbe Rootaert.
- 1712-1720: Jean-Georges Vilain, lord of Dumple, echevin of the Keure of Ghent, married Marie Sucx, Lady of Neufville; they only had a daughter, Jeanne-Marie Vilain, ending this branch of the Vilain family on her death in 1764.
- Christophel Vilain, mentioned in 1461, as Lord of Huise (Huisse), Burcht and Zwijndrecht
- Godefridus Vilain, mentioned in 1461 as Lord of Wommelghem and the Ameyden
- Gudula (or Goele) de Gand, dite Vilain, Lady of Ledeberg, married (somewhere around 1450-1475?) Jean de Montmorency, Lord of Nevele
- Margaretha Vilain, also mentioned in 1461 as married to Adriaan de Cruiningen, Viscount of Zeeland
- Jean-Philippe de Vilain (from the de Gand dit Vilain branch), first echevin of Ghent, president at the general assembly of Flanders, made a Viscount in 1758 by the Austrian Emperor

== Older or unclear ones ==
In 1466, we find in Ghent the death of a Joosyne Vilain, wife of Jacobs van Raveschoot, already with the armories of Vilain (and Raveschoot). The Van Raveschoots were a family of the Borluuts, so amongst the high nobility of Ghent.

An older branch (or older name of the same family?) is Vilain de Liedekercke (or Liedekerke; see the origin of the Vilain XIIII name above); around 1570, we find Jacqueline Vilain de Liedekercke, married to Philippe van Royen, knight, Lord of Gyseghem (Gijzegem); their daughter Marie van Royen (died 1595) married Philippe Triest, lord of Auweghem, mayor of Ghent ("premier echevin" of the Keure of Ghent), member of the very important Triest family of Ghent.

== Vilain van der Moere ==
This seems to be a very old branch of the Vilain family; including

- Isabeau Vilain van der Moere married Jean de Gavre, lord of Eksaarse and Swavenaerde, second son of Baron Rasse de Gavre; she died in 1274
- Goswin Vilain, knight (chevalier), died in 1356, buried in Ghent; married to Marie van Moerkerke; father of Marguérite Vilain, dit van der Moere, married Pierre van Baersdorp, Lord of Peereboom

== Vilain dit Braem ==
A less well-known branch of the family, with members:

- Josse Vilain dit Braem, Sub-bailiff of Ghent in 1479, married Lady Anne de Sadelaere; one child
  - Philippe Vilain dit Braem (died 8 May 1565), Lord of Douve, Toulieu, Looringue...; married Marguerite van der Straeten; one child, Catherine Vilain, ending this branch of the family

== Titles ==
=== Lord of Sint-Jans-Steene ===
This is supposedly the first title of the Vilain family, with origins lost in time (or alternatively given to the family at the time of Zegher I, Castellan of Ghent). Omitting the earlier, less certain bearers of the title, we have;

- Villanus de Gand, father of Jean and Alxandre
- Jean de Gand dit Villain, died young in 1262, succeeded by his brother Alexandre
- Alexandre Vilain, after 1262 (correct or apocryphal?)
- A Jean Vilain, lord of Sint-Jans-Steen, is supposed to have died in 1316; it is unclear which Jean Vilain this is
- Jean Vilain (ca. 1424); mentioned in 1400 as Jehan Vylain
- Adrien de Gand, dite Vilain, son of Jean (after 1424; mentioned in 1429 as "Vylain")
- Martin de Gand-Vilain (died 1465)
- Adrien de Gand de Vilain (died in 1532)
- Maximilien de Gand dit Vilain (died 1583)

==== Baron of Sint-Jans-Steene ====
- Jacques-Philippe Vilain de Gand (died 5 January 1628)
- Guillaume de Gand, son of Jacques-Philippe, died in 1637
- Guillaume-Ernest de Gand (died 12 September 1694 in Oudenaarde)
- Adrien-Honoré de Gand, uncle of Guillaume-Ernest
- André de Gand (died 13 January 1705), brother of Adrien-Honoré
- N. De Gand (died 11 July 1708) son of André

=== Count of Liberchies ===
- Guillaume-Ernest de Gand (died 12 September 1694 in Oudenaarde), first Count of Liberchies
- Adrien-Honoré de Gand, uncle of Guillaume-Ernest
- André-Lamoral de Gand (died 13 January 1705), brother of Adrien-Honoré
- N. De Gand (died 11 July 1708) son of André
- Marie Isabelle Ernestine de Gand, dite Vilain (married before 1736; died 1749); the title then moved out of the Gand-Vilain family to the Du Faing family

=== Lord of Hem ===
- Adrien de Gand-Vilain (died 12 June 1490)
- Maximilien de Gand dit Vilain (died 1583)
- Gilbert de Gand dit Vilain, second son of Maximilien

==== Marquis of Hem ====
- Jacques-Philippe de Gand-Vilain (married 1660), son of Gilbert de Gand
- François-Gilbert de Gand, Marquis of Hem, son of Jacques-Philippe
- N. De Gand, Marquis of Hem, died before 1716, no issue; son of François-Gilbert
- Michel-Maximilien de Gand, Marquis of Hem after the death of his brother; no issue
- Count Jean-Guillaume de Gand; Marquis of Hem after the death of his grand-uncle Michel Maximilien

=== Lord of Ledeberg ===
- M. Vilain, died 8 July 1449
- Gudula de Gand, dite Vilain, Lady of Ledeberg (around 1450-1475?)

=== Lord of Dumple ===
- Jean Vilain XIIII, Lord of Dumple (after 1607)
- Jean-François Vilain XIIII, lord of Dumple (son of Jean Vilain XIIII)
- around 1678-1690: Guillaume Vilain, Lord of Dumpele
- around 1712-1720: Jean-Georges Vilain, lord of Dumple

=== Lord of Vergier ===
- about 1636-1653: Jonkheer Christoffels Vilain, Lord of Vergier

=== Lord of Werue ===
- around 1657-1663: Jan Vilain, Lord of Werue

=== Lord of Rassenghien ===
- Adrien de Gand, dite Vilain, son of Jean (after 1424) (inherited the title through his mother)
- Martin de Gand-Vilain (died 1465)
- Adrien de Gand-Vilain (died 12 June 1490)
- Adrien de Gand de Vilain (died in 1532)

==== Baron of Rassenghien (Resseghen/Rasseghem) ====
- Maximilien de Gand dit Vilain (died 1583)
- Jacques-Philippe Vilain de Gand (died 5 January 1628)
- Philippe-Lamoral Vilain de Gand (died 6 January 1631)
- Balthazar Philippe de Gand, dit Vilain
- Around 1633-1640: Frans/Franchoys van Ghent, gheseyt (=dite) Vilain, Baron van Resseghen (= Rassenghien), van Borsbeke, Lord of Oordegem
- Louis de Gand, dit Vilain (16 Juli 1678 - ?)

=== Baron of Borsbeke ===
- Around 1633-1640: Frans/Franchoys van Ghent, gheseyt (=dite) Vilain, Baron van Resseghen (= Rassenghien), van Borsbeke, Lord of Oordegem

=== Lord of Oordegem ===
- around 1633-1640: Frans/Franchoys van Ghent, gheseyt (=dite) Vilain, Baron van Resseghen (= Rassenghien), van Borsbeke, Lord of Oordegem

=== Count of Middelburg ===
- Balthazar Philippe de Gand, dit Vilain
- Jean Alphonse de Gand, dit Vilain (Brussels 13 July 1655 - 6 May 1687)
- Louis de Gand, dit Vilain (16 Juli 1678 - ?)
- Alexandre Maximilien Balthazar de Gand, dit Vilain (died 2 January 1759)
- Elisabeth-Pauline de Gand de Merode de Montmorency, daughter of Alexandre Maximilien, born 1737: last holder of the title in the Gand-Vilain family

=== Lord of Isenghien ===
- Adrien de Gand dit Vilain became Lord of Isenghien in 1525, through his marriage
- Maximilien de Gand dit Vilain (died 1583); made Count of Isenghien in 1582

==== Count of Isenghien ====
- Jacques-Philippe Vilain de Gand (died 5 January 1628)
- Philippe-Lamoral Vilain de Gand (died 6 January 1631)
- Maximilien de Gand dit Vilain, eldest son of Philippe-Lamoral (died in 1636).
- Balthazar Philippe de Gand, dit Vilain, second son of Philippe-Lamoral

==== Prince of Isenghien ====
- Jean Alphonse de Gand, dit Vilain (Brussels 13 July 1655 - 6 May 1687)
- Louis de Gand, dit Vilain (16 Juli 1678 - ?)
- Princesse Elisabeth-Pauline de Gand de Merode de Montmorency, daughter of Alexandre Maximilien, born 1737: last holder of the title in the Gand-Vilain family

=== Viscount of Ypres ===
- Balthazar Philippe de Gand, dit Vilain
- Jean Alphonse de Gand, dit Vilain (Brussels 13 July 1655 - 6 May 1687)
- Louis de Gand, dit Vilain (16 Juli 1678 - ?)

=== Baron of Frentz ===
- Balthazar Philippe de Gand, dit Vilain
- Jean Alphonse de Gand, dit Vilain (Brussels 13 July 1655 - 6 May 1687)
- Louis de Gand, dit Vilain (16 Juli 1678 - ?)

=== Lord of Glajon ===
- Balthazar Philippe de Gand, dit Vilain
- Jean Alphonse de Gand, dit Vilain (Brussels 13 July 1655 - 6 May 1687)

==== Baron of Glajon ====
- Louis de Gand, dit Vilain (16 Juli 1678 - ?)

=== Lord of Croifilles ===
- Balthazar Philippe de Gand, dit Vilain
- Jean Alphonse de Gand, dit Vilain (Brussels 13 July 1655 - 6 May 1687)

==== Baron of Croifilles ====
- Louis de Gand, dit Vilain (16 Juli 1678 - ?)

=== Lord of Masmines ===
- Jacques-Philippe Vilain de Gand (died 5 January 1628)
- Balthazar Philippe de Gand, dit Vilain

==== Prince of Masmines ====
- Balthazar Philippe de Gand, dit Vilain
- Jean Alphonse de Gand, dit Vilain (Brussels 13 July 1655 - 6 May 1687)
- Louis de Gand, dit Vilain (16 Juli 1678 - ?)
- Princesse Elisabeth-Pauline de Gand de Merode de Montmorency, daughter of Alexandre Maximilien, born 1737: last holder of the title in the Gand-Vilain family

=== Lord of Huisse ===
  - Jean de Gand, dit Vilain, III (circa 1400)
- M. Vilain, died 8 July 1449
- Christophel Vilain (mentioned as Lord of Huise in 1461)
- Martin de Gand-Vilain (died 1465)

=== Lord of Wetteren ===
- Adrien de Gand de Vilain (died in 1532)
- Maximilien de Gand dit Vilain (died 1583)

=== Lord of Kalken ===
- Adrien de Gand de Vilain (died in 1532)
- Maximilien de Gand dit Vilain (died 1583)

=== Lord of Estaires ===
- Hélène Vilain de Gand (before 1532-after 1550)

=== Lord of Lichtervelde ===
- Maximilien de Gand dit Vilain (died 1583)

=== Lord of Welle ===
In 1414, a Daniel Vilain was owner of seignory Welle in the Land of Beveren.

- François-Ignace Vilain XIII (died 1740)
- Charles-Ignace Vilain XIIII, son of François-Ignace (died 1786)

=== Lord of Idderghem ===
- François-Ignace Vilain XIII (died 1740)
- Charles-Ignace Vilain XIIII, son of François-Ignace (died 1786)

=== Lord of Steenvoorde ===
- Hector Vilain (ca 1426), married Catherine de Duras; they had a daughter, Catherine Vilain, who married Jean d'Argenteau, Lord of Esseneux

=== Lord of Liedekercke (or Liedekerke) ===
- Adrien de Gand, dite Vilain, son of Jean (after 1424)
- Colard de Gand, dite Vilain, second son of Adrien (died between 1459 and 1463)
- Adrien de Gand-Vilain, son of Colard; the titles then pass to the family of Hennin-Liétard

=== Lord of Leeuwe (or Leeuw), later Denderleeuw ===
- Adrien de Gand, dite Vilain, son of Jean (after 1424)
- Colard de Gand, dite Vilain, second son of Adrien (died between 1459 and 1463)

==== Viscount of Denderleeuw ====
- Colard de Gand, dite Vilain, second son of Colard (ca. 1509)
- Jérôme de Gand-Vilain Vanden Steen, son of Colard
- Erasme de Gand-Vilain, dit Vanden Steen, son of Jérôme
- Nicolas de Gand-Vilain, dit Vanden Steen, son of Erasme
- Amand Vanden Steen, son of Nicolas, ca. 1550
- Jean Vanden Steen, son of Amand

The title is kept in the Vanden Steen family for many generations afterwards, and adds many other titles as well

=== Lord of Lombeke / Viscount of Lombeke ===
- Adrien de Gand, dite Vilain, son of Jean (after 1424)
- Colard de Gand, dite Vilain, second son of Adrien (died between 1459 and 1463)

==== Count of Lombeke ====
- Colard de Gand, dite Vilain, second son of Colard (ca. 1509)

=== Lord of Lomme ===
- Maximilien de Gand dit Vilain (died 1583)
- Gilbert de Gand dit Vilain (after 1583)

=== Lord of Sailly ===
- Maximilien de Gand dit Vilain (died 1583)
- Gilbert de Gand dit Vilain (after 1583)
- Count Jean-Guillaume de Gand (after 1716: see the Lords of Hem for the names in between)

=== Lord of Forest ===
- Maximilien de Gand dit Vilain (died 1583)
- Gilbert de Gand dit Vilain (after 1583)
- Count Jean-Guillaume de Gand (after 1716: see the Lords of Hem for the names in between)

=== Viscount of Ghent ===
- Viscount Jacques de Gand

==== Count of Ghent ====
- Count François-Dominique de Gand, son of viscount Jacques
- Count Jean-Guillaume de Gand, son of François-Dominique
- Count Charles de Gand, second son of François-Dominique

=== Viscount of Audrignies ===
- André de Gand (died 13 January 1705)

=== Baron of Assenede ===
- Adrien de gand dite Vilain, ca. 1450

=== Count of Ognies/Ongnies ===
- Balthazar Philippe de Gand, dit Vilain
- Jean Alphonse de Gand, dit Vilain (Brussels 13 July 1655 - 6 May 1687)
- Louis de Gand, dit Vilain (16 Juli 1678 - ?)

=== Lord of Charleroi/Charleroy ===
- Balthazar Philippe de Gand, dit Vilain
- Jean Alphonse de Gand, dit Vilain (Brussels 13 July 1655 - 6 May 1687)
- Louis de Gand, dit Vilain (16 Juli 1678 - ?)

=== Lord of Lannoy ===
- Balthazar Philippe de Gand, dit Vilain
- Jean Alphonse de Gand, dit Vilain (Brussels 13 July 1655 - 6 May 1687)
- Louis de Gand, dit Vilain (16 Juli 1678 - ?)

=== Lord of Waten/Waeten ===
- Balthazar Philippe de Gand, dit Vilain
- Jean Alphonse de Gand, dit Vilain (Brussels 13 July 1655 - 6 May 1687)
- Louis de Gand, dit Vilain (16 Juli 1678 - ?)

=== Count of Vianden ===
- Jean Alphonse de Gand, dit Vilain (Brussels 13 July 1655 - 6 May 1687)
- Louis de Gand, dit Vilain (16 Juli 1678 - ?)

=== Viscount of Wahagnies ===
- Jean Alphonse de Gand, dit Vilain (Brussels 13 July 1655 - 6 May 1687)
- Louis de Gand, dit Vilain (16 Juli 1678 - ?)

=== Viscount of Ledreghen/Ledreghem ===
- Jean Alphonse de Gand, dit Vilain (Brussels 13 July 1655 - 6 May 1687)
- Louis de Gand, dit Vilain (16 Juli 1678 - ?)

=== Count of Merode ===
- Louis de Gand, dit Vilain (16 Juli 1678 - ?)

=== Baron of Warneston ===
- Louis de Gand, dit Vilain (16 Juli 1678 - ?)

=== Lord of St. Amands and Baasrode ===
- Colard de Gand, dite Vilain, second son of Adrien (died between 1459 and 1463)

=== Lord of Burcht ===
- M. Vilain, died 8 July 1449
- Christophel Vilain
- This title later went to the Montmorency family, somewhere around 1500 probably

=== Lord of Zwijndrecht ===
- Vilain van Gent, 1262
- M. Vilain, died 8 July 1449
- Christophe Philippe Vilain, ca. 1450-1500, married to Jeanne de Lannoy
- This title went to the Montmorency family in 1461

=== Lord of Wommelghem ===
- Godefridus Vilain, mentioned in 1461

=== Lord of Pamel ===
- M. Vilain, died 8 July 1449

=== Lord of Kruibeke ===
- Alexander Vilain, 1262 (correct or apocryphal?)

By 1369, this was no longer in the hands of the Vilain family But:

- Ide Vilain, daughter of Philippe Vilain, Lord of Kruibeke (Cruybeke), ca. 1470

=== Lord of Doel ===
At one time, the Vilain family was Lords of Doel

=== Count of Rupelmonde ===
- Philippe-Mathieu Vilain XIIII, (3 December 1753 - after 1791)
  - Count Philippe-Louis Marie Ghislain Vilain XIIII (1778-1856)
