= Holy Cross Church, Heusden =

Holy Cross Church
- Dutch: Heilig Kruiskerk
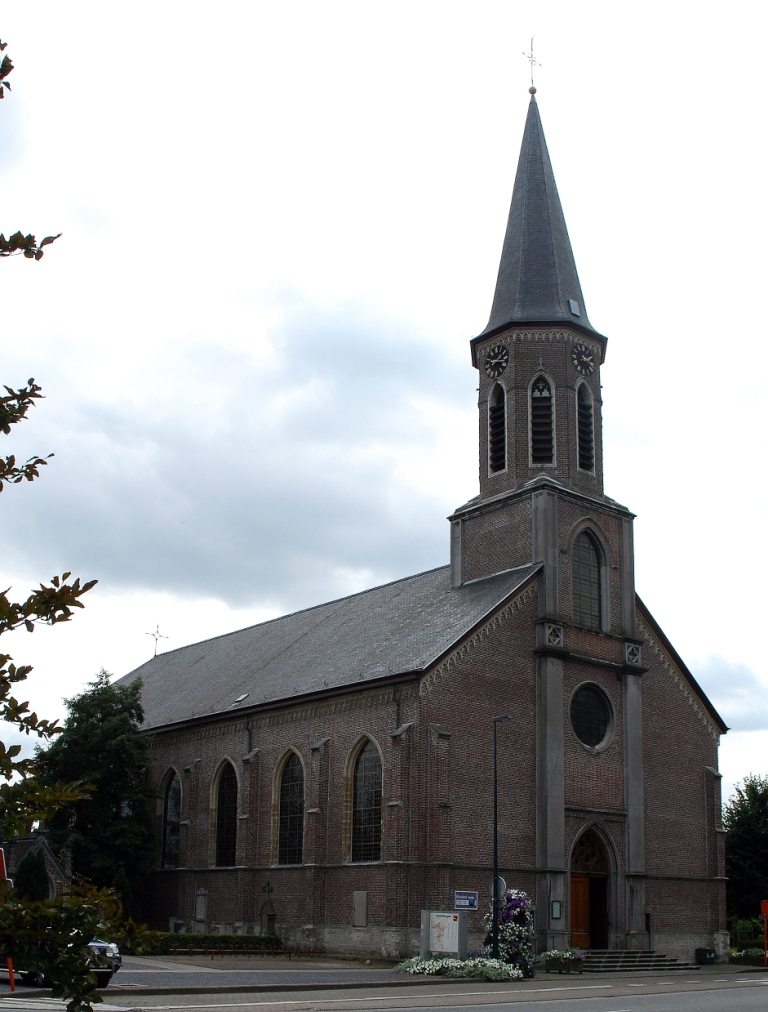
- Holy Cross Church
- 51°1′41.33″N 3°47′57.35″E
- Location: Heusden, Destelbergen, Flemish Region
- Country: Belgium
- Denomination: Roman Catholic

History
- Status: Parish church

Architecture
- Functional status: Active
- Architect: Mathias Wolters
- Style: Gothic Revival

The Holy Cross Church (Dutch: Heilig Kruiskerk) is a church in the Belgian sub-municipality of Heusden. The church was built in 1844 on the site of an older church. It is dedicated to the Exaltation of the Holy Cross. The organ of the church was protected as a monument in 1980. It has a 1873 case designed by Auguste Van Assche.

The church is an example of early Gothic Revival, built on the site of a church, probably from the 17th century. Two paintings by Antoon van den Heuvel (Adoration of the Magi from 1652 in the left aisle and Christ Stripped of His Clothes from 1664 behind the main altar) come from the old church. Also from the old church are two portico altars in white and black marble.

The Neo-Gothic furniture dates from the 19th century. The main altar in oak is by Jan Baptist Hauman from Ghent, with sculptures by Pieter De Vigne. Also from the 19th century is another painting, inspired by Van Dyck, by Domien Vanden Bossche from Geraardsbergen. The Neo-Gothic stalls and panelling are also in oak. There is a Neo-Gothic polychrome stone epitaph of Robert Helias d'Huddeghem from 1865, with a sculpture of the Resurrection by Leonard Blanchaert after a design by Jean-Baptiste Bethune.

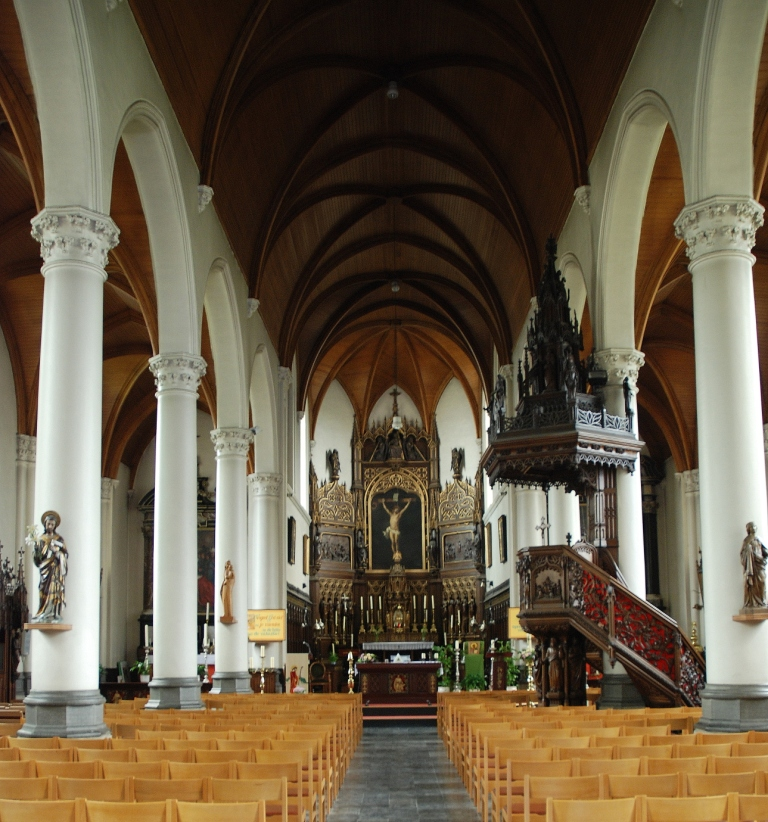
Internal view of Holy Cross Church in Heusden

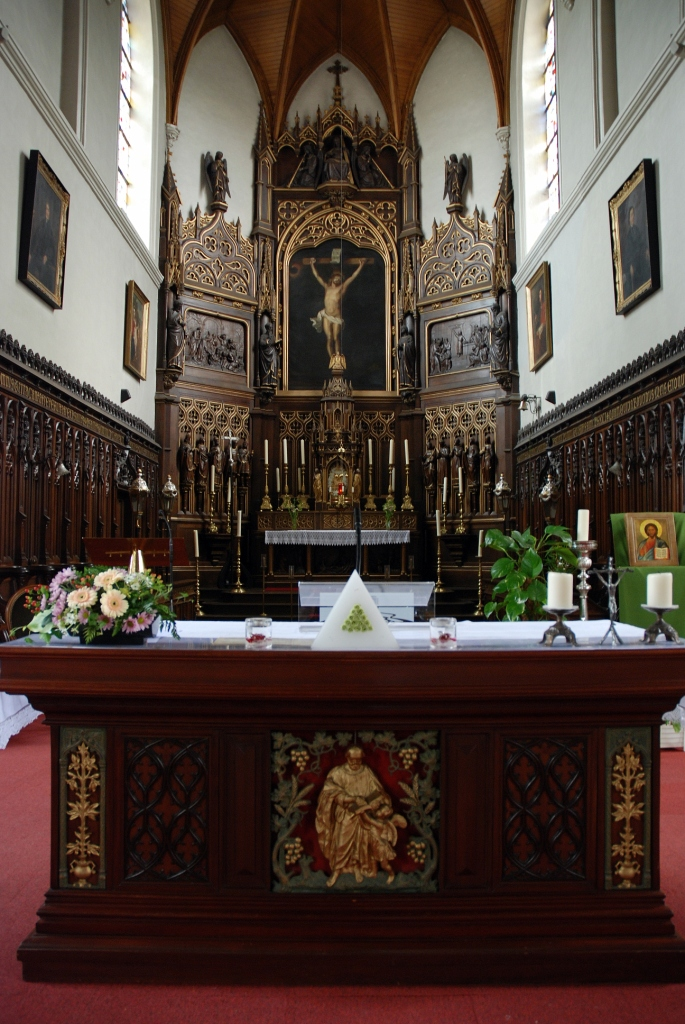
Holy Cross Church, altar

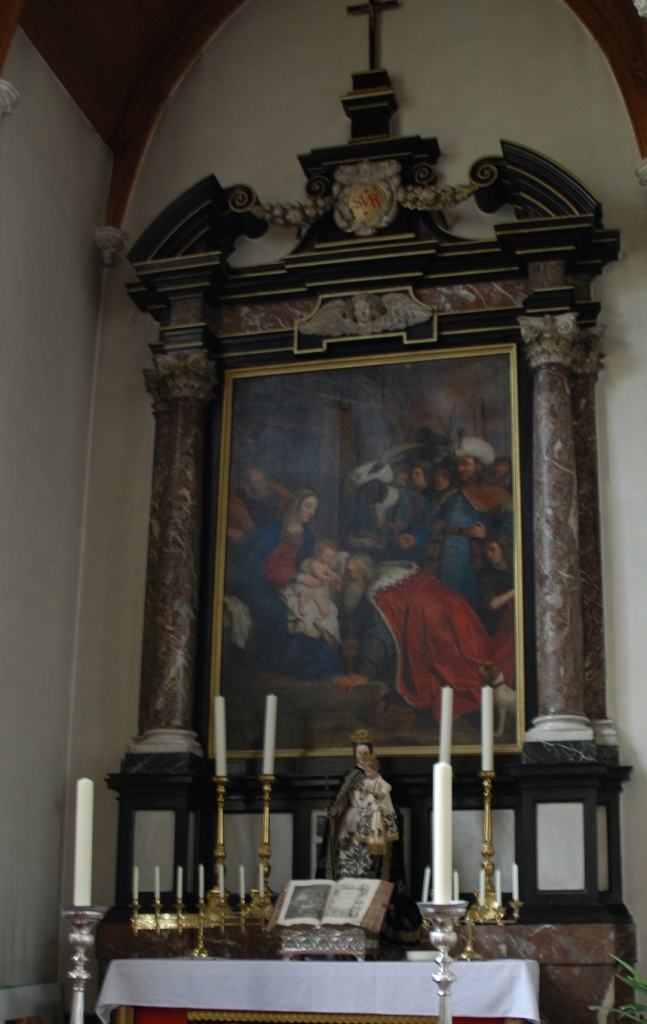
Portico altar from the old church with painting by Antoon van den Heuvel Adoration of the Magi from 1652

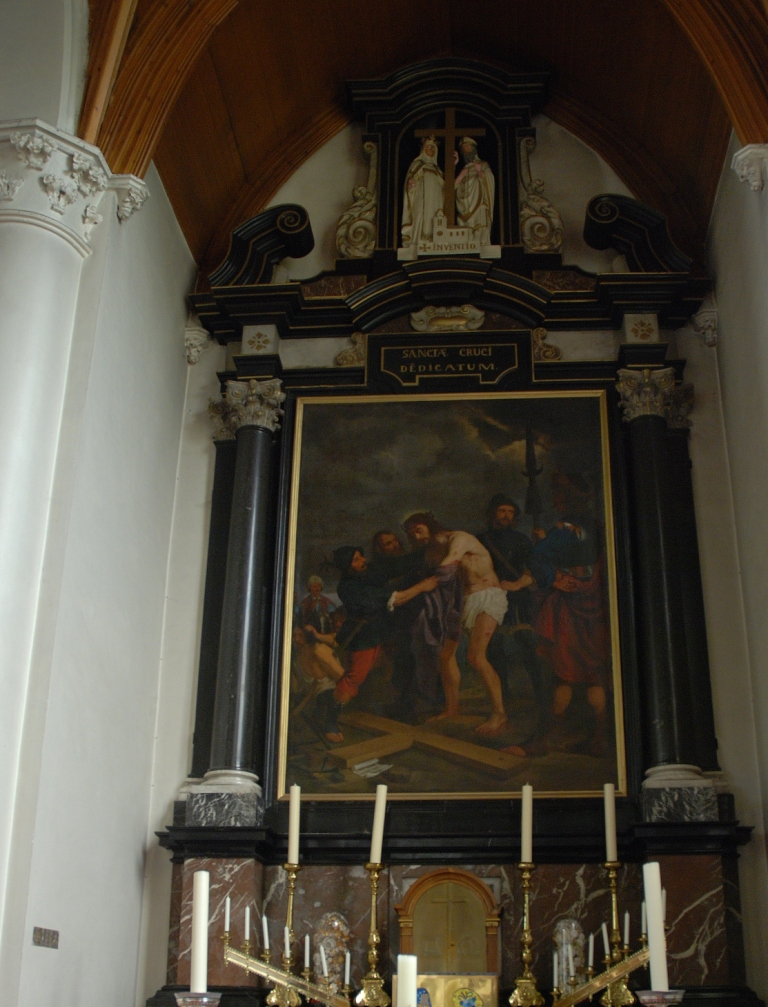
Christ Stripped of His Clothes, 1664, from an unknown master in the right aisle
