= Castle Stas de Richelle =

Castle in Belgium

Castle Stas De Richele
- Belgium
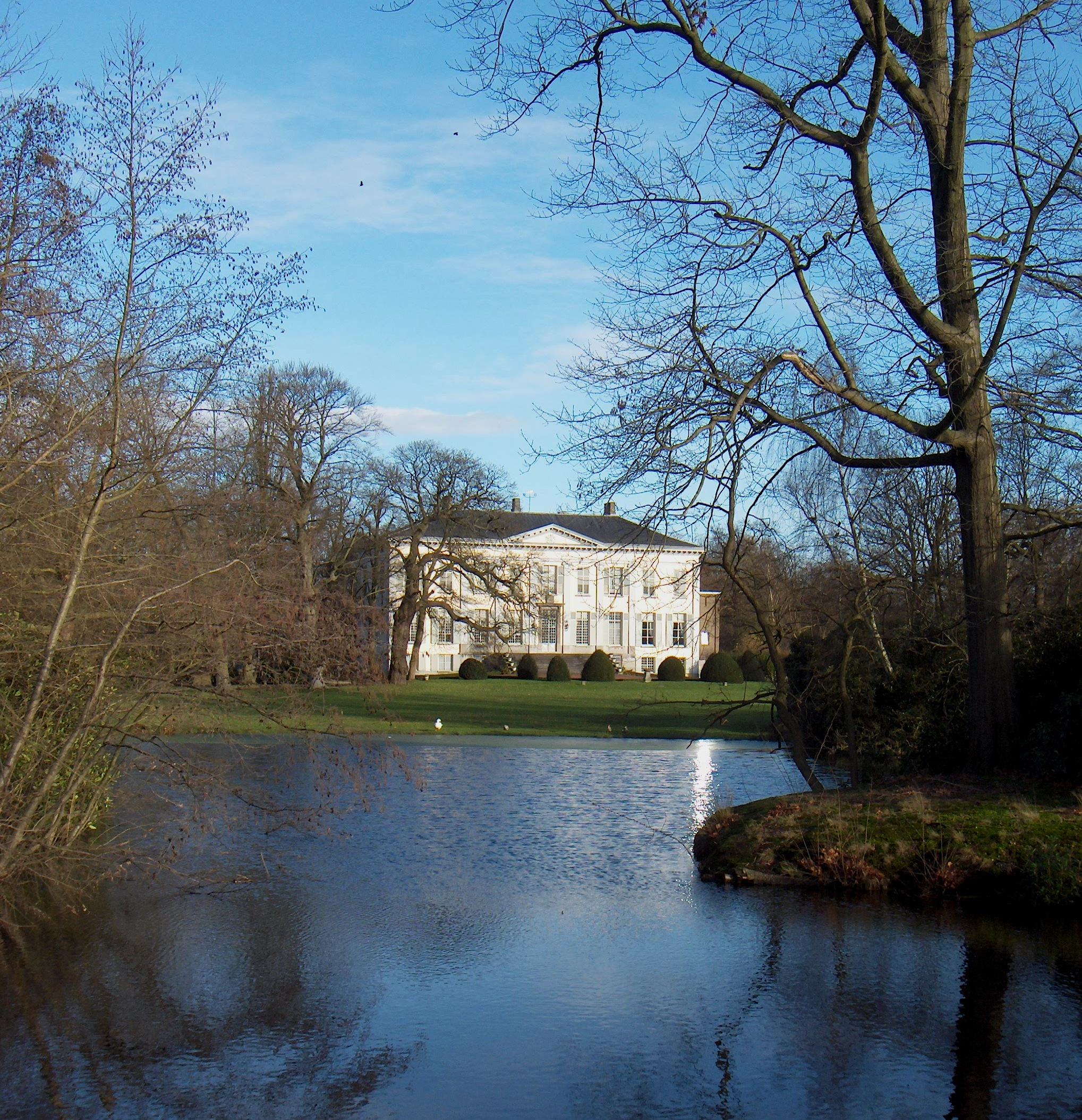

Site information
- Type: Castle

Location
- Coordinates: 51.0294°N 3.7941°E

Castle Stas De Richele (once known as Hof en leen ter Aelmeersch) is a castle located in Heusden, Belgium.

The castle is in a location near the Scheldt that in the Middle Ages was a site with moats. Joris van Crombrugghe, lord of Poeke, had a new huys van plaisance built in the fief of Aelmeersch in the 17th century. By 1725, according to PJ Benthuys' 1725 map, the now castle belonged to the lord of Boelare (of the van Crombrugghe family). It had by then become a castle with an elaborated moat. It belonged to Mr Morel from Ghent in the second half of the 18th century, and passed to E. Coppens by the end of the same century. In 1837 the site changed hands, as baron C. Coppens exchanged this estate with other landholdings in Heusden and Melle with dowager Coleta Du Rot.

The castle as it appears today is neoclassical in style, the result of an enlargement that took place after 1830 and before 1858. The floor and plaster ceilings date from the mid-18th century.

To the south of this castle, opposite the parish church, there are the ruins of the Kasteel ter Kerchove, a castle dating to the Middle Ages. It belonged to the de Grutere family in the 15th century, and via marriage passed to the van Crombrugghe family in the 16th century. Moats and the basement have been preserved.
