= Wissekerke Castle =

Castle in Belgium

Coordinates: 51.145°N 4.301°E

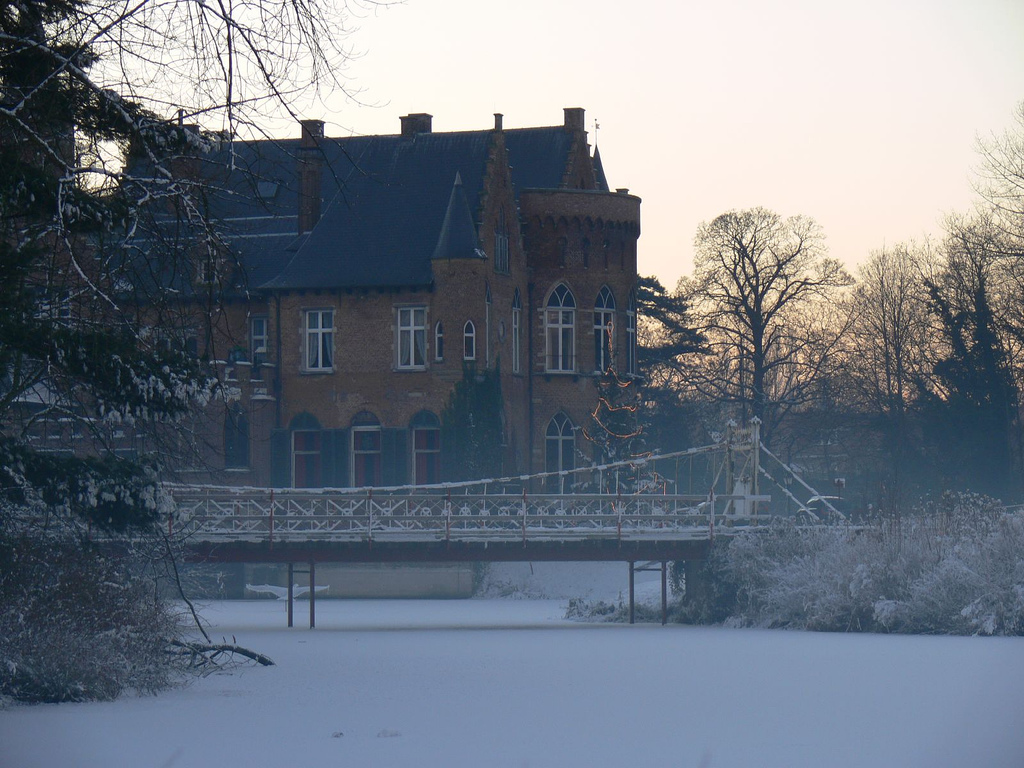
Wissekerke Castle seen here with the suspension bridge in front of it

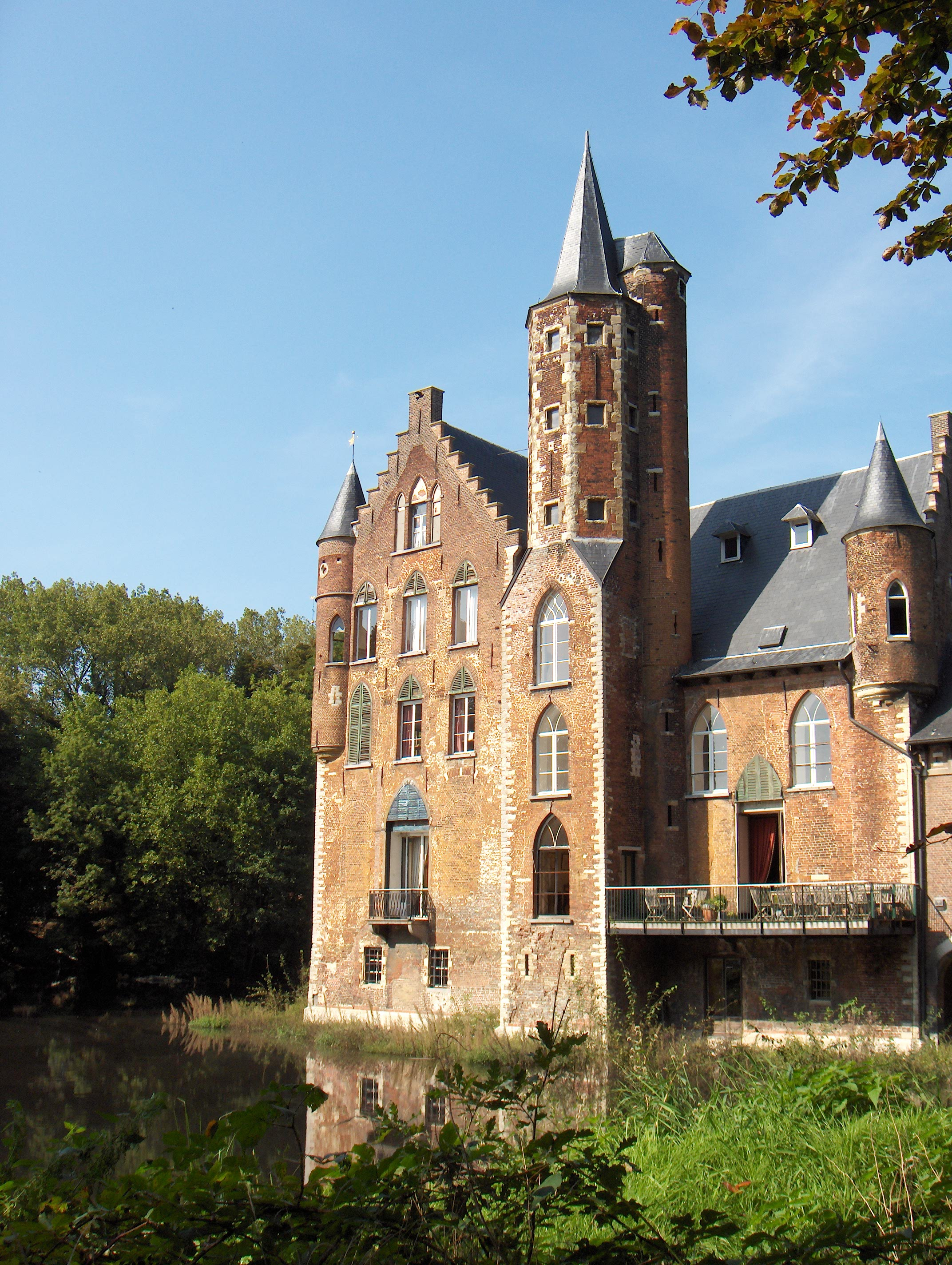
Close-up of the castle

The Wissekerke Castle is situated in the village of Bazel of Kruibeke municipality in the East Flanders province of Belgium. Although a castle stood at this site since 10th century, the present castle was largely built in the 15th century with lake, park and a suspension bridge built around the castle. The suspension bridge by the castle is one of the oldest surviving wrought iron suspension bridges in Europe and was designed in 1824 by Jean-Baptiste Vifquain, an engineer from Brussels

Many famous people lived at Wissekerke castle, including the influential family of Vilain XIIII. For 139 years the members of this family were the mayors of Bazel. Through the centuries the castle has been rebuilt and renovated. The most important building works were completed in the 19th and 20th centuries. Most of the present architecture recalls 19th century neo-gothic style. The major interior features also date from this period. The castle, the gatehouse, the iron suspension bridge, and the pigeon tower were listed as monuments in 1981. In 1989 the castle was purchased by the town of Kruibeke, which has since handled the restoration work. The castle is also venue to many cultural activities, tours, and exhibitions.

In spite of the modest span of 23 meters, the bridge is of great industrial archaeological value, because of its historical and structural uniqueness. Since 1981, the bridge at Bazel has been a protected historic monument.

== See also ==
- List of castles in Belgium
