= Petronella of Courtrai =

Petronella of Courtrai (Petronille) (? – after 1214) was a Dutch noblewoman and regent. She ruled the Lordship of Ghent during the absence of her husband Zeger II of Ghent in 1200-1202 and after he died, during the minority of her son Zeger III of Ghent in 1202-?.

She was a daughter of a woman named Sarah and lord Roger I of Courtrai.

Petronella was a wife of Lord Zeger II and with him, mother of:

- Zeger III of Ghent
- Daniel
- Arnold
- Gilles (he was married and he fathered a son named Arnold)
- Dirk
- Bernhard
- Walter (Woutre and later Woutreman)
- Beatrix

Her husband Zeger II was a templar from 1200 and in 1202 he died, and she continued as regent for their son Zeger. She remained influential after her son took over the government and donated some lands to an abbey. When signing documents she used the titulature of Burgravine.
