= Zeger III of Ghent =

Zeger III
- Lord of Heusden, of Bornhem, and of Saint-Jean Steen
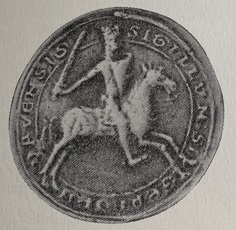
- Seal of Zeger III
- Reign: Chatelain of Ghent
- Predecessor: Zeger II
- Successor: Hugh I
- Died: 1227
- Spouse: Beatrix of Heusden
- Father: Zeger II of Ghent
- Mother: Petronella of Coutrai

Zeger III of Ghent (called The Good) was the lord of Heusden, of Bornhem, and of Saint-Jean Steen, and the Châtelain of Ghent. He was the second son of Zeger II, Lord of Ghent and Petronella of Coutrai. His older brother, Arnold, died before 1190, leaving him the heir to the estate of his parents. He took his title of lord of Ghent, Bornhem, and Saint-Jean Steen around 1199. He married Beatrix of Heusden, and through her became Lord of Heusden, a title which was held by his son and progeny.

Beatrix was the daughter of Hughes of Heusden, son of Anselm III, Lord of Heusden (not to be confused with his cousin, Hughes of Heusden, son of Anselm's brother Eustace, Lord of Choques).

== Administration of Flanders ==
Philip I of Namur, margrave of Namur and Regent of Flanders with his brother, Baldwin I of Constantinople, fought in the fourth crusade and won the crown of Constantinople. While they were abroad, along with John of Nesle, Zeger was entrusted to the administration of Flanders, being noted in the record in this role in dealings in 1206 and 1210.

== Marriage of Ferdinand, prince of Portugal and Jeanne of Constantinople ==
In 1211, Zeger attended the marriage of Ferdinand of Portugal with Joan of Constantinople, daughter of Baldwin I of Constantinople. On returning to Flanders with his army, the couple was accompanied by Philip I of Namur, Zeger, and John of Nesle, châtelain of Bruges. Joan's first cousin, Louis (the future Louis VIII of France) - eldest son of Philip Augustus and Joan's aunt, Isabella of Flanders - held the couple prisoner while he seized the towns of Aire and Saint-Omer. Upon release, Ferdinand began an attempt to regain these towns.

Leaving his wife, who was ill, in Douai, the group went on to the towns of Lille, Coutrai, Ypres, and Bruges. The people of Ghent saw this group's arrival as an attempt to increase the power of France over them, and led by Rasse of Gavre and Arnold of Audenarde, political enemies of Zeger, chased the group away from Ghent. They were saved by cutting a bridge that separated them from their enemies, whose army was said to be quite massive.

Zeger was part of the negotiations, which resulted in the treaty of the bridge of Wendin, signed February 24, 1211 and granting Louis and his heirs the towns of Aire and Saint-Omer. In exchange, Louis promised to never claim Flanders.

By the next year, 1212, Zeeger III retired to the castle of his wife's family in Heusden, and his wife became a benefactor of Anchin Abbey. On August 9, 1212, whether due to beneficence or the demands of the people, Zeger granted citizens of the city of Ghent (really the bourgeois) the privileged to annually renew their aldermen.

== War of Bouvines ==
At the same time, Ferdinand increased his ties with John Lackland, king of England, and sought greater acceptance in Flanders. Ferdinand's affections turned to Zeger's enemies, including Rasse of Gavre and Arnold of Audenarde, and along with John of Nesle, Zeger allied himself with Louis VIII of France, which some in Flanders saw as treachery. It is possible that Zeger secretly supported Philip Augustus, King of France's intention to dismember Flanders, and he aided Philip in the War of Bouvines. During this time, Zeger had taken residence at a new castle, Belle-Maison, in the town of Hesdin.

During the War of Bouvines, Philip Augustus seized Bruges and lay siege to Ghent. The French fleet invaded the port of Damme, but was destroyed upon the advance of the English fleet with Ferdinand. Philip retreated from Ghent and Ferdinand then went to Bruges, Ghent, and Ypres and fortified his army.

In the winter of 1214, Philip retreated to France to rebuild his army and Ferdinand to England to secure support against the French. At this time, Zeger assisted Louis VIII, Philip's son, in his seizure of the towns of Bailleul, Steenvorde, and several other places. In revenge, Ferdinand sacked and plundered Saint-Omer, Guinness, Artois, Sanchu, and Lens, in acts described as particularly vicious, as well as destroying Zeger's new castle at Hesdin. These events led to the decisive Battle of Bouvines, which the French won, and Ferdinand was taken prisoner and brought, for a time, to the tower of the Louvre.

== Retirement ==
These events strengthened Zeger, who again retired at Heusden. In 1225 a man appeared who claimed to be Baldwin of Constantinople, who had died in 1205 or 1206. He soon became the focus of a popular revolt, and Ziger played a role in unmasking him. Ziger's efforts to protect Jeanne led Mouske, a historian of the time, to call Ziger the good lord of Ghent.

In the later years of his life, Ziger is believed to have been a charitable lord and good administrator, assisting in the building of bridges over the waters allowing the better connection of Ghent neighborhoods Briel and Over the Reke (the location of Saint Bavo Abby). By his death in 1227, he had reconciled with Ferdinand, serving as a witness in court affairs around the Easter holiday of that year.

== Family ==
By his wife, Beatrix of Heusden, Ziger had numerous children:

- Hugh I of Ghent, lord of Heusden, Bornhem, and Saint-Jean Steene and Chatelain of Ghent, married Odette of Champagne.
- Ziger of Ghent, married in 1235 to Ode of Grimberghen
- Gerard of Ghent, called the devil, married Elisabeth of Slote
- Walter of Ghent, archdeacon at the church of Arras
- William of Ghent called the Frisian
- Ferdinand of Ghent
- Bernard of Ghent, called of Meren, married Margueritte of Wervy
