= Walter of Ghent =

French noble

Walter of Ghent (de Gand dit Villain) (died before 1260) was the second son of Hugues I and Odette de Champagne, daughter of Odo II of Champlitte. Hugues married Lady Avezoete, daughter of Abraham and perhaps of the house of Maelstede. Although his brother inherited the lordship of Heusden and Bornhem, he received the lordship of Sint Jansteen. He took the name Villain, a name synonymous with peasant or farm boy.

Avezoete and Walter had a very large family. Their children included:

- Johannes (died before August 1262)
- Alexander, married Ysabeau d' Axelle
- Walter
- Sohier
- Isabelle, married Jean Robert Van Den Kerchove Van Ter-Varent
- Phillippe
- Williames
- Odine, married Henri de Westhuse
- Katerine
