= Hugh I of Ghent =

Hugh I, of Ghent (died 1232) was lord of Heusden, Bornhem, and Saint-Jean Steene, Chatelain of Ghent. Hugh was the eldest (of 8) child of Zeger III of Ghent and Beatrix of Heusden.

== Early Lordship ==
He was knighted before 1218 and took the residence at the castle at Heusden and the title of Lord of Heusden on September 21, 1223, and shortly after succeeded his father as lord of Bornheim, of Saint-Jean Steen and as chatellenie of Ghent. He continued his families support for the abbey of Saint Bavo. Before his father passed he was married to Odette of Champagne, daughter of Odo II of Champlitte (who died shortly after taking part in the siege of Constantinople). Thus, from his wife, Hugh gained lordship of the village of Champlitte, which he sold to William of Vergy, brother of Alice of Vergy, duchess consort of Burgundy. About the same time (March 1228), he established some taxes and corresponding rights to the inhabitants of Baesrode Saint Marie, which outlined some of the rights and duties of citizens and public officials.

== Involvement with Ferdinand, Count of Flanders ==
Before 1226, Ferdinand, Count of Flanders had been held captive by Louis, future king of France. For some of this time, Hughes resisted his obligations as vassal of Ferdinand, but to avoid war eventually decided to again accept the rule of the count. His oath of fealty held that he would repay the count what he was owed, and if Hugh or his brothers went to war against the count, he would be seized and imprisoned until his debts were repaid. This oath was signed by Arnold of Oudenaarde, Adam of Milly, Walter of Ghistelles, William of Bethune, Gislebert of Sottegem, Rase of Gavre, Walter of Formeselles, John of Mechelen, lord of Witte, Malin of Meterne, and Eustache, chamberlain of Flanders.

== Later years ==
After that affair, Hugh concentrated less on political acts, and was active as a philanthropist in support of nearby religious groups. Among those receiving gifts were the Abbey of Our Lady of Biloke in Ghent in 1230 and another gift to the Abbey of Saint Bavo in 1231. By his death in 1232, Hugh had fully establish himself at Heusdan, which was to be the home of many of his decedents.

== Family ==
By his wife, Odette of Champagne, Hugh had numerous children:

- Hugh II, of Ghent, lord of Heusden, Bornhem, and Chatelain of Ghent, married Marie of Gavre, daughter of Rasse of Gavre.
- Walter of Ghent, called Villain, lord of Saint-Jean Steene, married to lady Avezoete, daughter of Alexander ser Braemszoon, a wealthy textile merchant
- Ziger of Ghent, married to Alice, lady of Saint-Sepulcher and of Chanlot
- Philippe of Ghent
- Guillaume of Ghent, Doyen of the church of Saint Pierre in Lille
- Another Daughter
