= Nieuwenbosch Abbey =

Coordinates: 51°1′2.532″N 3°47′39.019″E

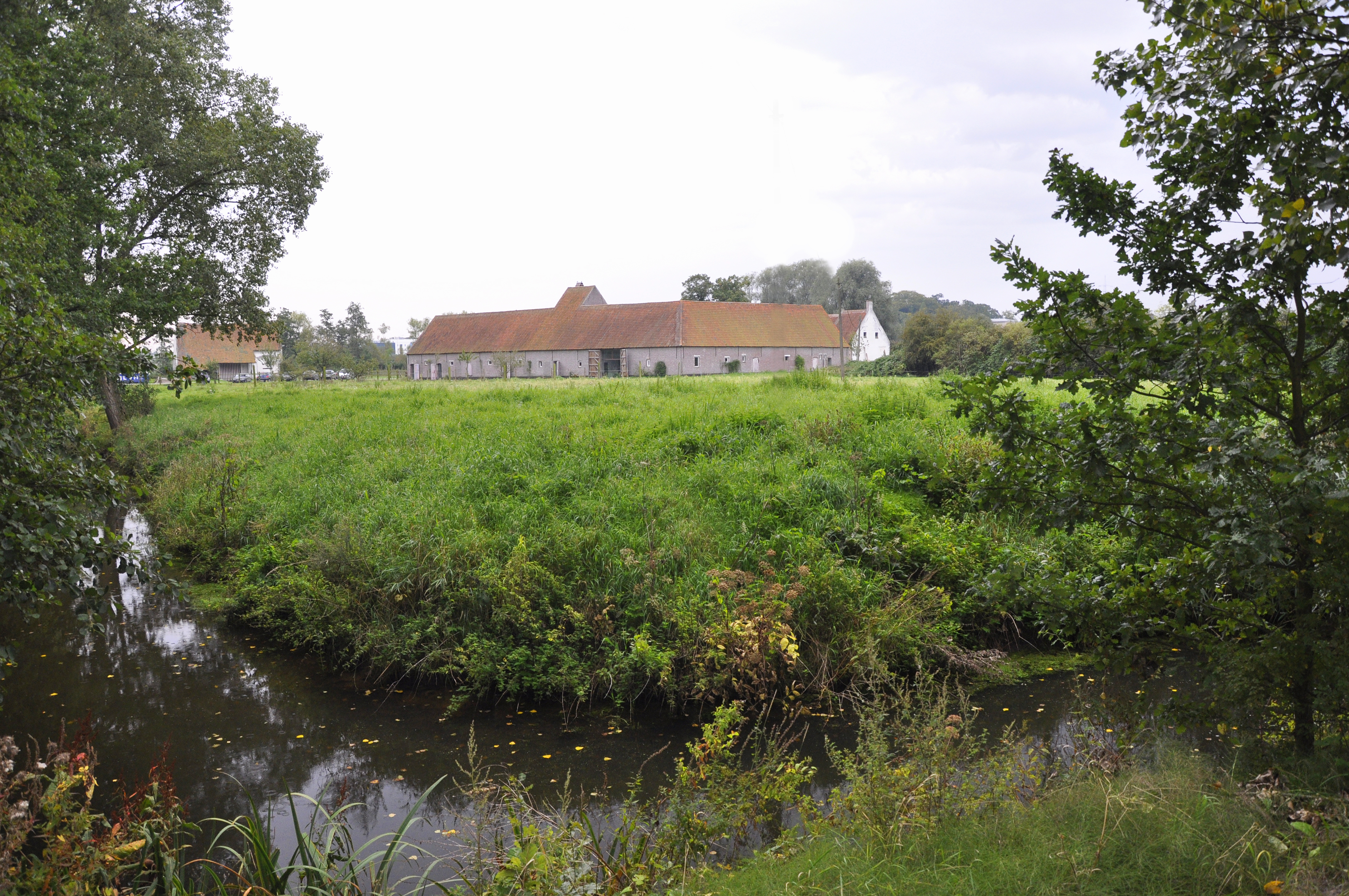
De Bosseveerhoeve, the former abbey farm

Nieuwenbosch Abbey, also Nieuwenbos Abbey (Dutch: Abdij Nieuwenbosch or Nieuwenbos) was a Cistercian nunnery in Heusden, East Flanders, Belgium, later relocated to Ghent.

== History ==
The Cistercian community was established in 1215 as the abbey of Onze Lieve Vrouwe ten Bosse at Bosse in Lokeren, known from 1259 as Oudenbos or Oudenbosch. The site was unsuitable because of the poor water supply and the nuns moved to the site in Heusden in 1257, when the name became "Nieuwenbosch".

The abbey was stormed and largely ruined in 1579 by the Iconoclasts, and the nuns moved for greater security inside the city of Ghent and built new premises in what is now the Lange Violettenstraat, in part using stone taken from the ruined buildings at Heusden, where the land and the few remaining structures were in due course rented out to farmers. The community was dissolved in 1796 in the French Revolution.

== Present day ==
The only visible remaining structure on the Heusden site is the former abbey farm, now known as the Bosseveerhoeve (or hoeve Ten Bossche or hoeve Caenepeel).

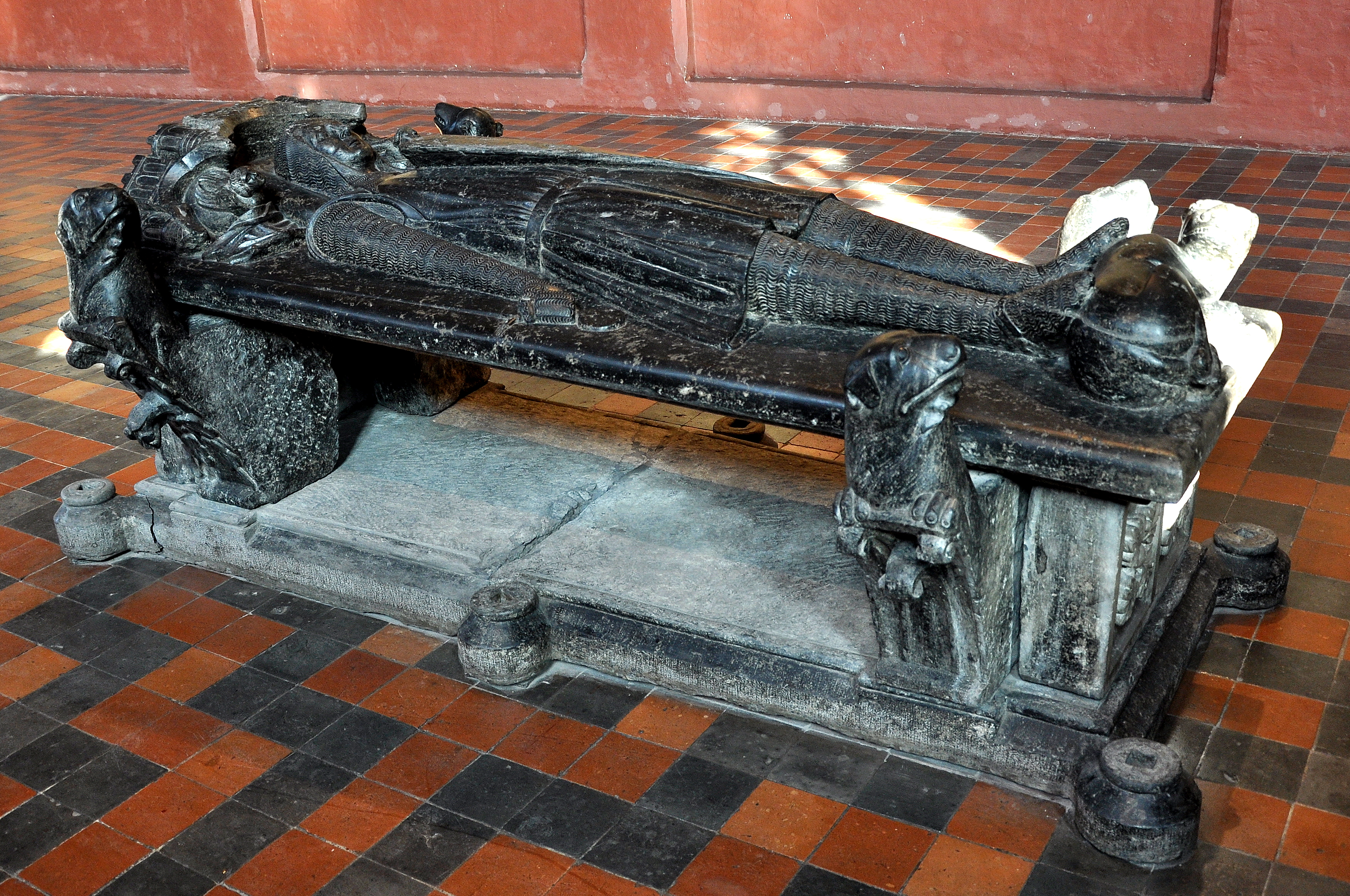
Monumental effigy of Hugo II of Ghent, in the Ghent City Museum

In 1948, on the site of the former abbey church (now the garden of the state horticultural college) was discovered a monumental effigy of Hugo II, castellan of Ghent (d. c. 1232), lord of Heusden and father of Hugo III, the most prominent benefactor at the time of the foundation of Nieuwenbosch. The effigy is now in the Ghent City Museum.
