= Destelbergen =

- Municipality
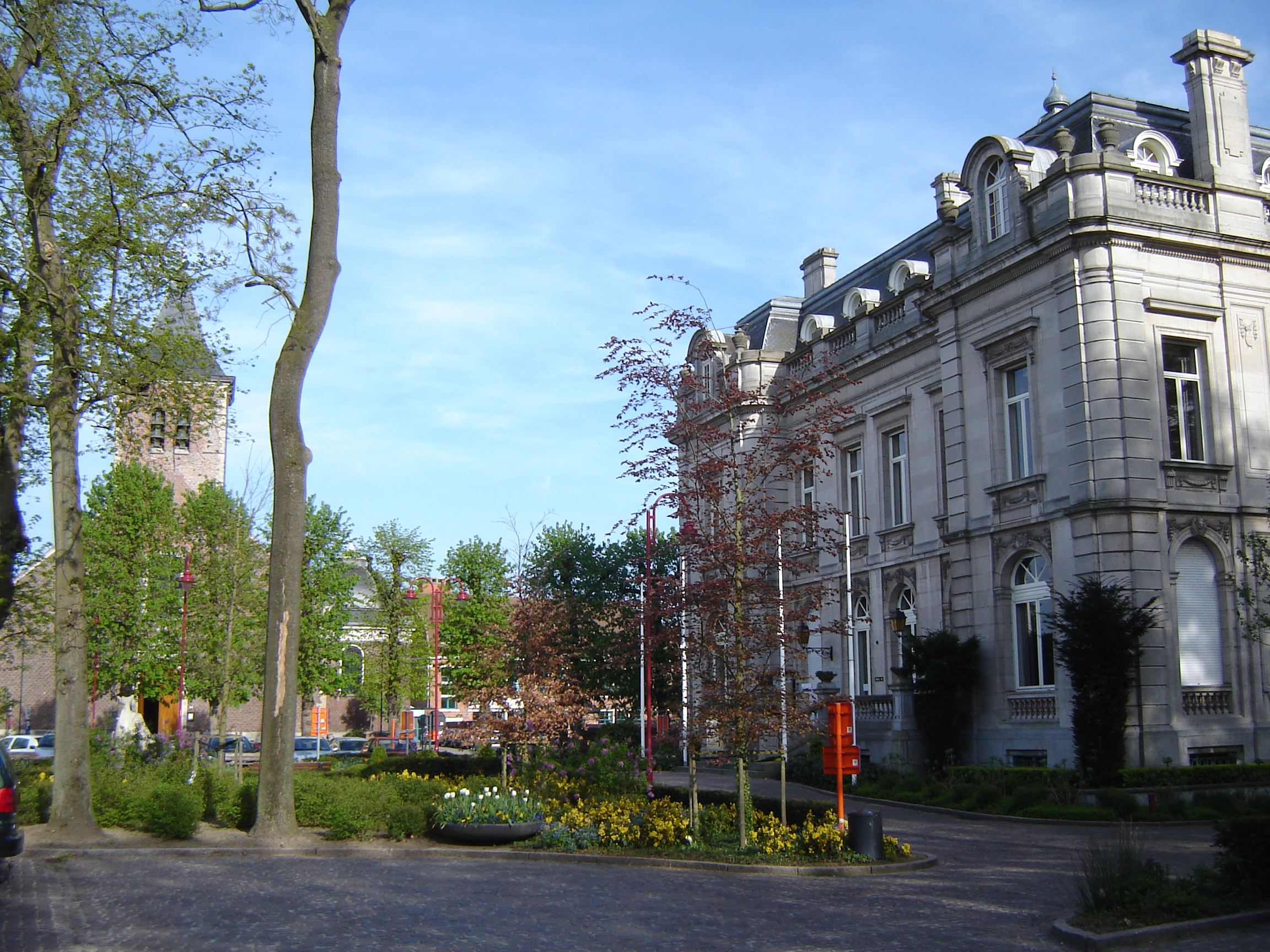

- Flag Coat of arms

- Location of Destelbergen in East Flanders
- Interactive map of Destelbergen
- Location in Belgium
- Coordinates: 51°3′N 3°48′E
- Country: Belgium
- Community: Flemish Community
- Region: Flemish Region
- Province: East Flanders
- Arrondissement: Ghent

Government
  - Mayor: Elsie Sierens (Open Vld)
  - Governing parties: Open Vld, N-VA

Area
  - Total: 26.7 km^{2} (10.3 sq mi)

Population (2018-01-01)
  - Total: 18,026
  - Density: 675/km^{2} (1,750/sq mi)
- Postal codes: 9070
- NIS code: 44013
- Area codes: 09
- Website: www.destelbergen.be

Destelbergen (Dutch pronunciation: [ˌdɛstəlˈbɛrɣə(n)]) is a municipality located in the Belgian province of East Flanders. The municipality comprises the towns of Destelbergen proper and Heusden and was created on 1 January 1977, by the fusion of these two municipalities. Its western border touches the municipality of Ghent and Melle and is formed by an ancient silted up branch of the river Scheldt.

In 2021, Destelbergen had a total population of 18,683. The total area is 26.71 km^{2} (10 sq mi).

Attractions are the many residential castles, a Gaulish farmhouse, and the Damvallei nature reserve.
