= Steenokkerzeel =

- Municipality
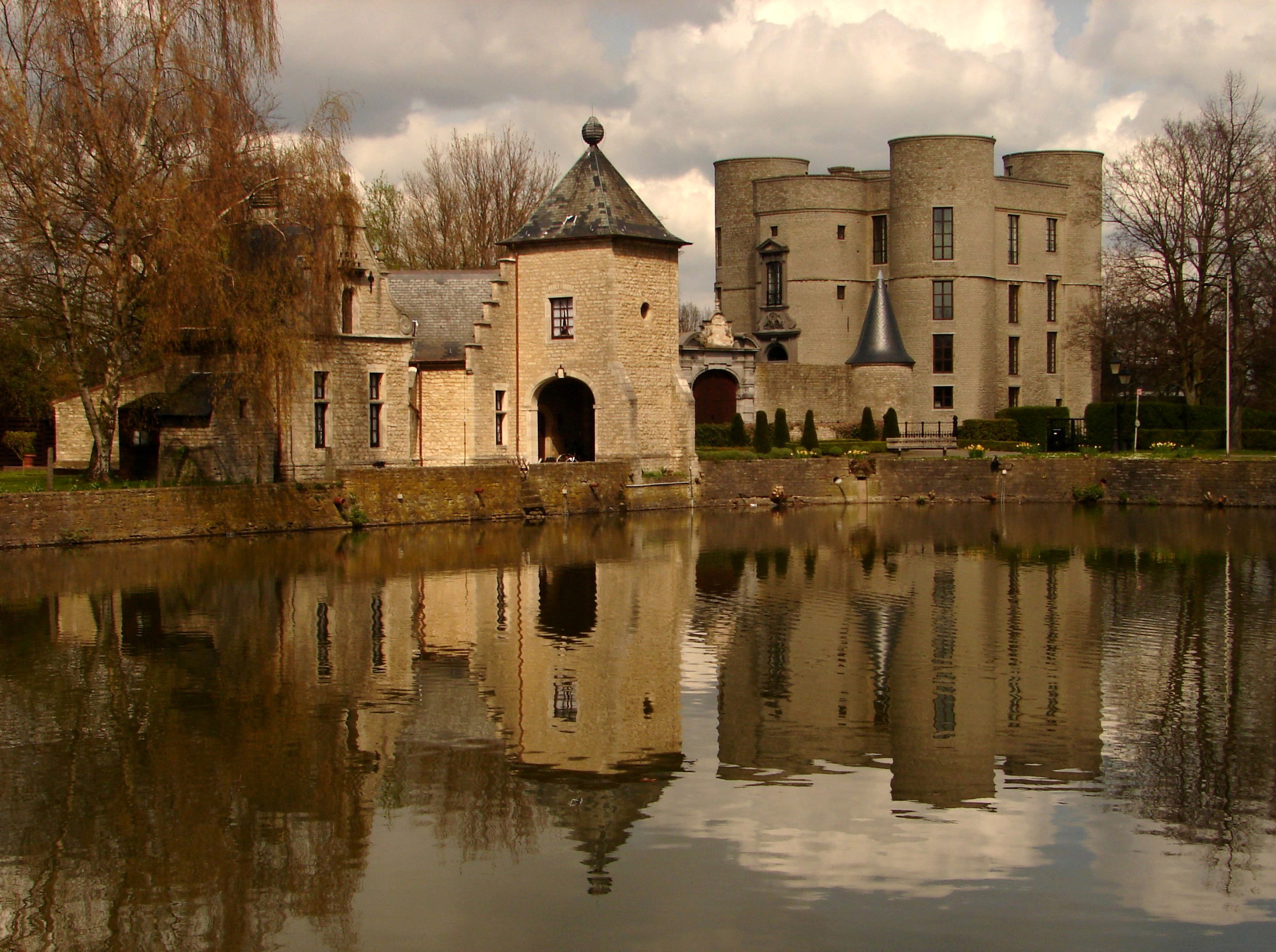
- Castle of Ham in Steenokkerzeel

- Flag Coat of arms

- Location of Steenokkerzeel in Flemish Brabant
- Interactive map of Steenokkerzeel
- Location in Belgium
- Coordinates: 50°55′N 04°31′E
- Country: Belgium
- Community: Flemish Community
- Region: Flemish Region
- Province: Flemish Brabant
- Arrondissement: Halle-Vilvoorde

Government
  - Mayor: Kurt Ryon (KLAVER-NVA)
  - Governing party: Klaver-N-VA

Area
  - Total: 23.63 km^{2} (9.12 sq mi)

Population (2025-01-01)
  - Total: 12,725
  - Density: 538.5/km^{2} (1,395/sq mi)
- Postal codes: 1820
- NIS code: 23081
- Area codes: 02, 016, 015
- Website: www.steenokkerzeel.be

Steenokkerzeel (Dutch pronunciation: [ˌsteːnˈɔkərzeːl]) is a municipality located in the Belgian province of Flemish Brabant, just to the northeast of Brussels. The municipality comprises the towns of Steenokkerzeel itself, Perk and Melsbroek, along with Melsbroek Air Base on the north side of Brussels-National Airport. On December 31, 2010 Steenokkerzeel had a total population of 11,580. The total area is 23.46 km² which gives a population density of 493 inhabitants per km². (Steenokkerzeel: 6.333 inhabitants, Melsbroek 2.508 inhabitants, Perk 2.739 inhabitants.)

Steenokkerzeel consists of the townships of Humelgem, Steenokkerzeel and Wambeek. Perk consists of the townships Perk, Huinhoven and Boekt. 't Dickt, Passiewijk and Zonnebos are the names of residential areas in Steenokkerzeel.

== Economy ==
- Sabena Flight Academy

== Notable inhabitants ==
- Aguila (born 1937), artist, industrial designer, and founder of the “probability reality”
- Zita of Bourbon-Parma, the last Empress of Austria, Queen of Hungary, and Queen of Bohemia.
