= The Phoebus Foundation =

British art foundation

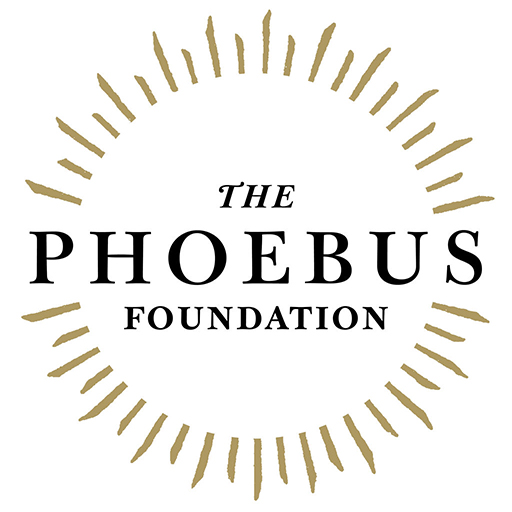
- Founder: Fernand Huts
- Established: 2011
- Head: Katharina Van Cauteren
- Website: https://phoebusfoundation.org

The Phoebus Foundation is an art foundation with philanthropic objectives. The foundation acquires works of art, guarantees a professional framework of conservation and management, and looks after the conservation and restoration of the objects. In doing so, it focuses on scientific research. It shares the results of this all with the widest possible audience, through exhibitions, cultural expeditions, symposiums and publications.

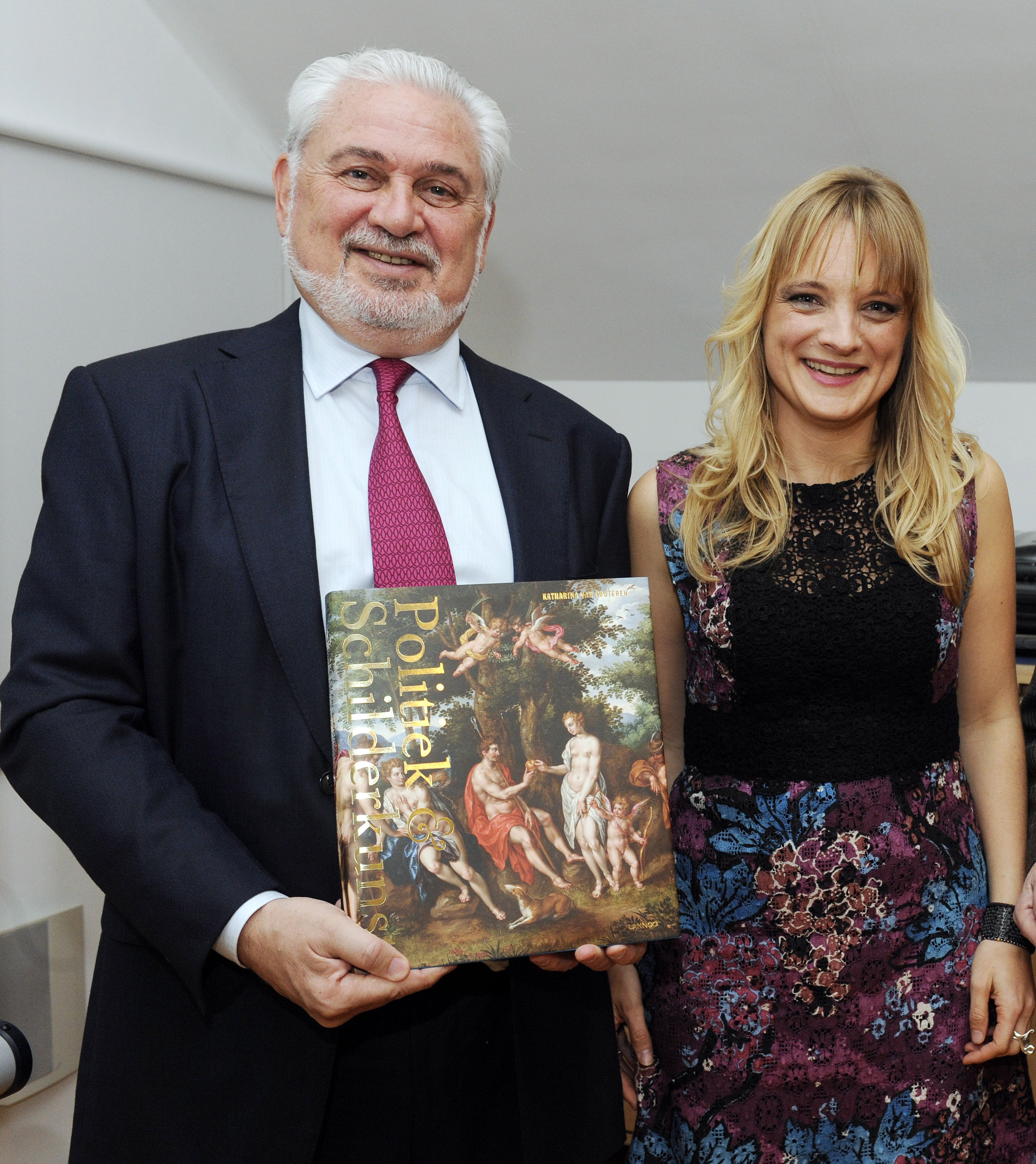
Fernand Huts and Katharina Van Cauteren, photo by Marc Gysens

== Vision ==
The Phoebus Foundation was founded to ensure the future of what started as the private collection of Fernand and Karine Huts and of the family enterprise Katoen Natie. To extract the collection from the industrial and financial risks of the Katoen Natie group of companies, it was placed in an independent legal structure, aimed at the management of its property rights. The Katoen Natie and the Huts family are not beneficiaries of the foundation. Objects from the foundation can never be sold for the benefit of the company and/or the family. The Phoebus Foundation strives to return high quality pieces to Flanders and/or to keep them here.

=== Anglo-Saxon inspiration ===
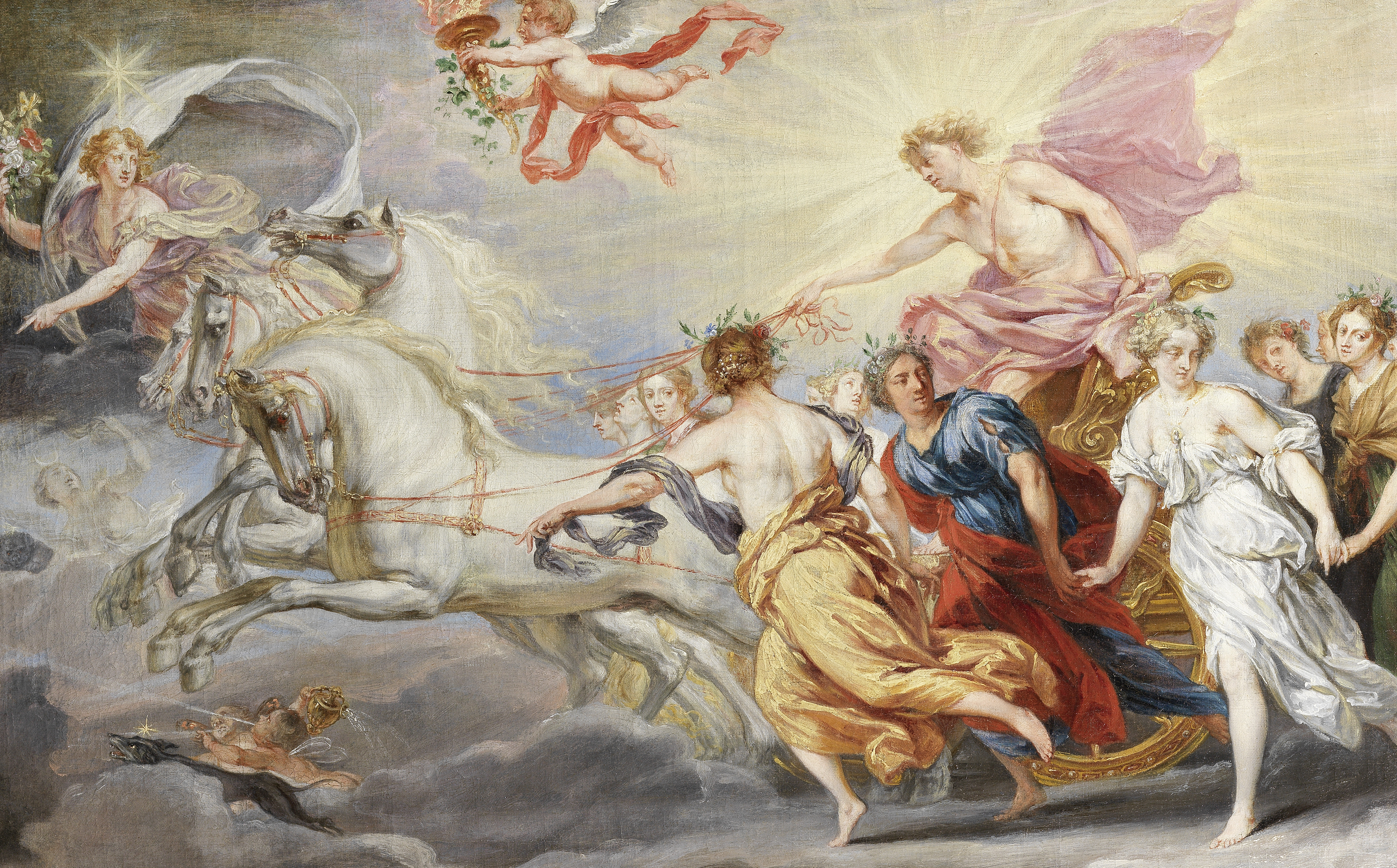
Phoebus Apollo by Jan Boeckhorst, from the collection of the Phoebus Foundation

The Anglo-Saxon approach served as inspiration for the founding of the Phoebus Foundation, following the example of cultural foundations such as the J. Paul Getty Museum in Los Angeles and the Frick Collection in New York.

=== Financial support ===
The Phoebus Foundation and its operations are supported by the companies of the Katoen Natie group and the Indaver group.

=== Name ===
'Phoebus' refers to Phoebus Apollo. In ancient mythology, Apollo functioned as the protector and leader of the muses. Together they entertain themselves on Mount Parnassus. Apollo brings inspiration or even divine enlightenment and is the protector of the mythical golden age – a heavenly era in which violence, greed, jealousy and injustice do not yet exist.

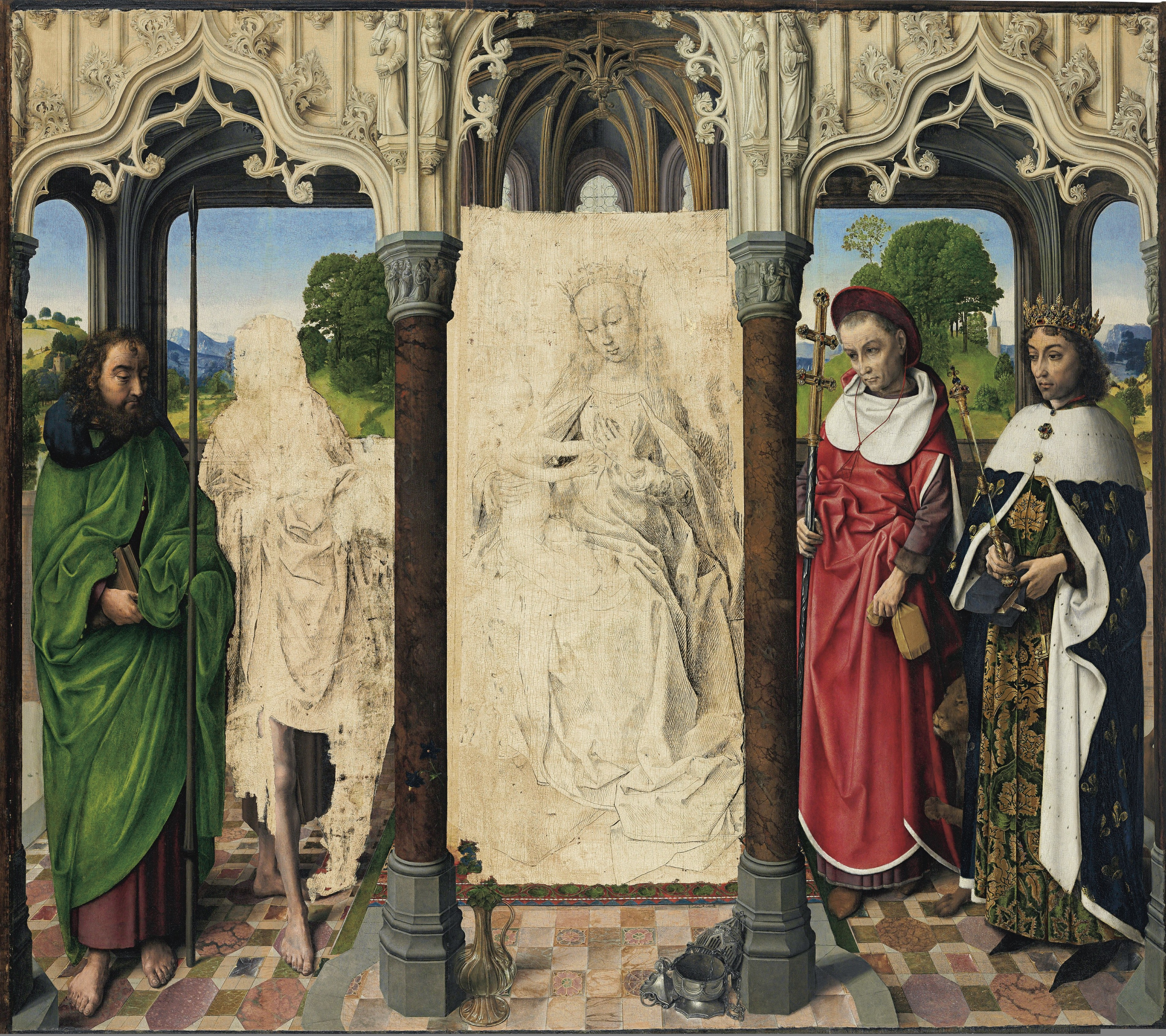
Hugo Van der Goes' Madonna with saints from the collection of the Phoebus Foundation, on long-term loan to the Art Institute of Chicago

== Collections ==
The collection of the Phoebus Foundation consists of nine subcollections.

=== Art from the Southern Netherlands from the Middle Ages to the Baroque ===
Painting and sculpture are the focal points of this collection, but there are also manuscripts, prints, drawings, and decorative objects. The emphasis is on art from the 15th, 16th, and 17th centuries, including works by Hugo Van der Goes, Hans Memling, Gerard David, Jan Gossaert, Pieter Bruegel, Maerten de Vos and Michaelina Wautier to Peter Paul Rubens, Antoon Van Dyck and Jacob Jordaens.

=== Belgian art from 1880 to 1930 ===
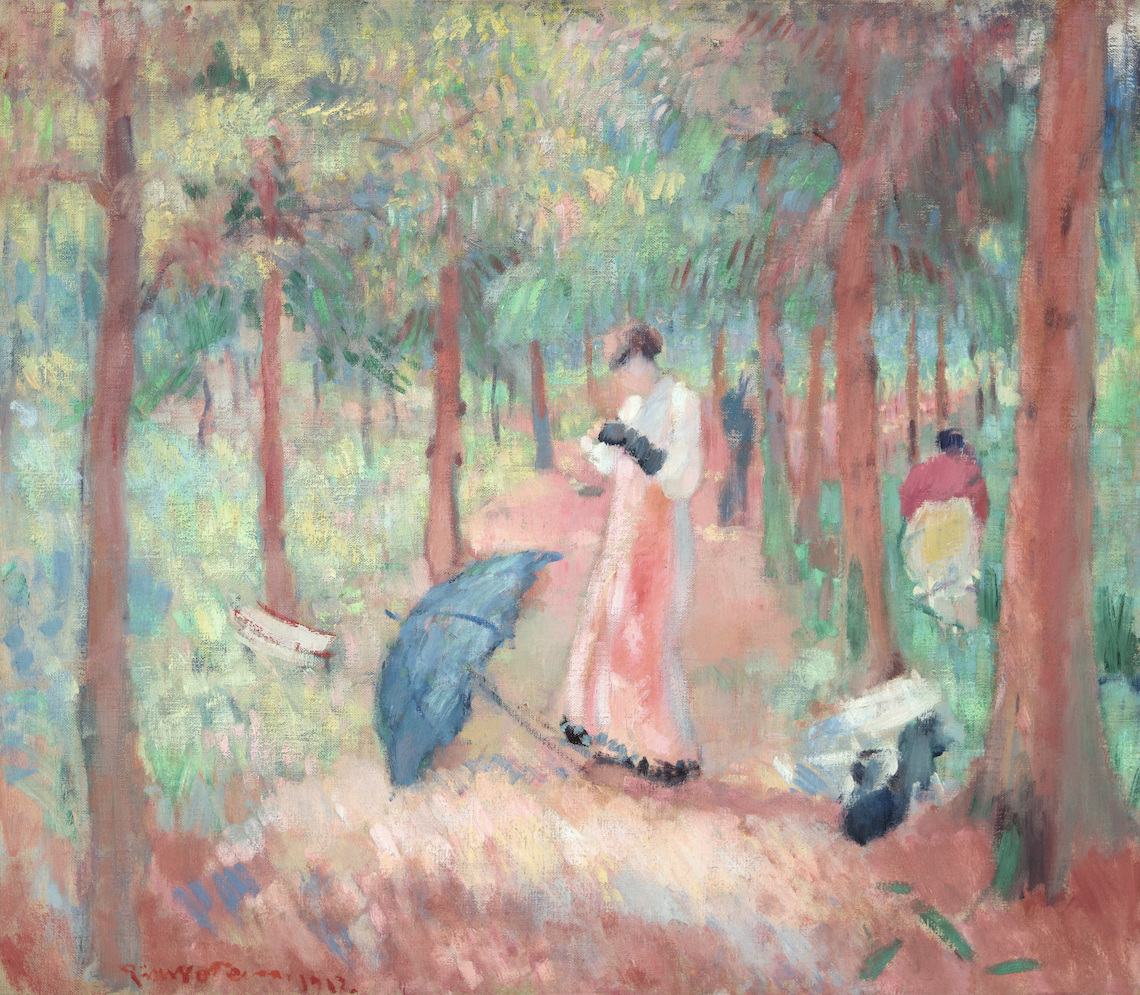
Rik Wouters 'The pink avenue' from the collection of the Phoebus Foundation

This collection centers around impressionist and symbolist artists from Sint-Martens-Latem, such as Emile Claus, Gustave Van de Woestyne, Valerius De Saedeleer and George Minne. It also features expressionists Gustave De Smet, Constant Permeke and Frits Van den Berghe, as well as works by Rik Wouters, James Ensor, Jules Schmalzigaug, Edgard Tytgat, Floris and Oscar Jespers, and surrealists such as Magritte and Delvaux.

=== Modern and contemporary art ===
The Phoebus Foundation owns works by Wim Delvoye, Marcel Broodthaers, Hans Vandekerckhove, Jan Vanriet and Jan Fabre.

In the park Singelberg, the Phoebus Foundation preserves works by the British artist Sophie Ryder, the Uruguayan Pablo Atchugarry, the Dutch Atelier Van Lieshout, and other artists such as Michaël Aerts, Hubert Minnebo and Wim Delvoye. In 2018, the Phoebus Foundation acquired numerous sculptures from the former Brussels Airport collection, with names such as George Grard, Jean-Michel Folon, Paul Van Hoeydonck, Jef Van Tuerenhout and Panamarenko.

=== CoBrA ===
The Phoebus Foundation owns an extensive collection of CoBrA art. The focus is on the early period of the movement, with works by Karel Appel, Alechinsky, Corneille, Jorn, Pedersen and Christian Dotremont.

=== Textiles from ancient times ===
This collection consists of fabrics and archaeological objects from ancient Egypt, including from the pharaohs and the Silk Road. The permanent exhibition '3500 years of textile art' is dedicated to this collection in HeadquARTers. The exhibition explores the history of Egypt, with linen cloths, animal mummies, fragments of death books, death masks and the tunic room. The tunic room displays the largest collection of complete tunicas in the world, along with accessories such as hairnets, socks, footwear and jewellery.

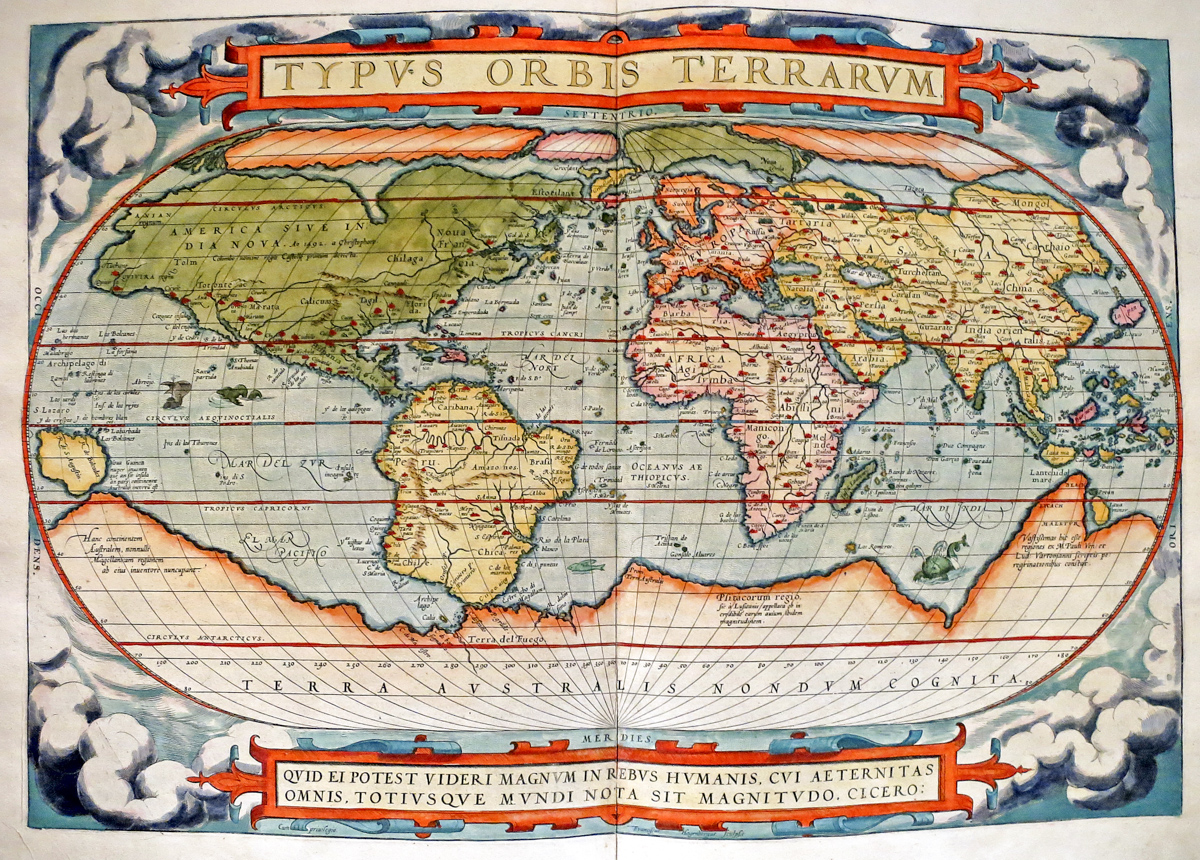
World map from Ortelius' Theatrum Orbis Terrarum from the collection of the Phoebus Foundation

=== 20th-century Latin American art ===
The Phoebus Foundation possesses an extensive collection of Latin American art. The collection holds masterpieces from – among others – Uruguay, Brazil, Argentina, Cuba, Mexico, with names such as Torres-Garcia, Gurvich, Alpuy, Berni, Schvartz and Matto.

=== Topography ===
This collection holds more than four hundred maps, atlases and cityscapes from the 16th, 17th, 18th and 19th centuries. Highlights include atlases from Mercator, Ortelius, Hondius, Blaeu and Kaerius.

=== Reynaert de vos ===
The Phoebus Foundation is the proud owner of more than 350 books about Reynaert de vos, from the early 16th century to today. This collection was exhibited in 2018 in the form of an 'expedition' about the medieval epic. In order to launch this the foundation worked together with Rik Van Daele, secretary-treasurer of the Reynaertgenootschap.

=== Port heritage ===
In 2003 Katoen Natie took the initiative to save the historical patrimony of the port companies. This resulted in a considerable collection of port heritage and historical photographs of the port of Antwerp.

== Conservation and management ==
The Phoebus Foundation is devoted to preserving the works of art from its own collection. The pieces are kept in the best possible conditions in air-conditioned art depots of Katoen Natie. The Royal Museum of Fine Arts Antwerp also keeps a part of its collection here.

In the restoration studio of The Phoebus Foundation, artworks are preserved, restored and subjected to scientific research.

== Research ==
The Phoebus Foundation strives for maximum knowledge acquisition on its own objects and on the broader cultural background in which these objects developed or functioned. In order to do so the Phoebus Foundation works together with academics and researchers at home and abroad. Such projects result into large and small exhibitions and/or publications.

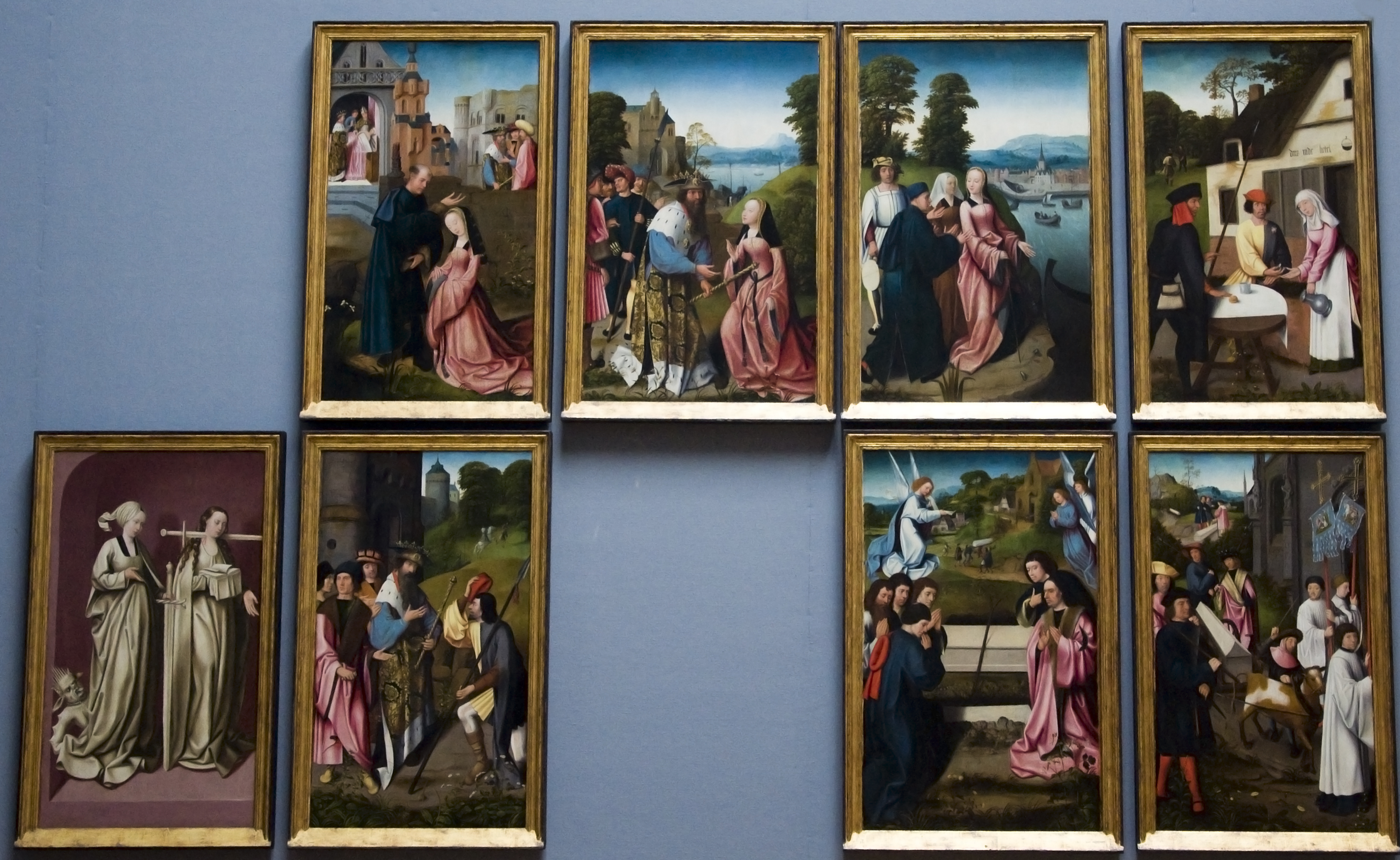
The Dymphna altarpiece by Goswin Van der Weyden, formerly on display at the Royal Museum of Fine Arts Antwerp

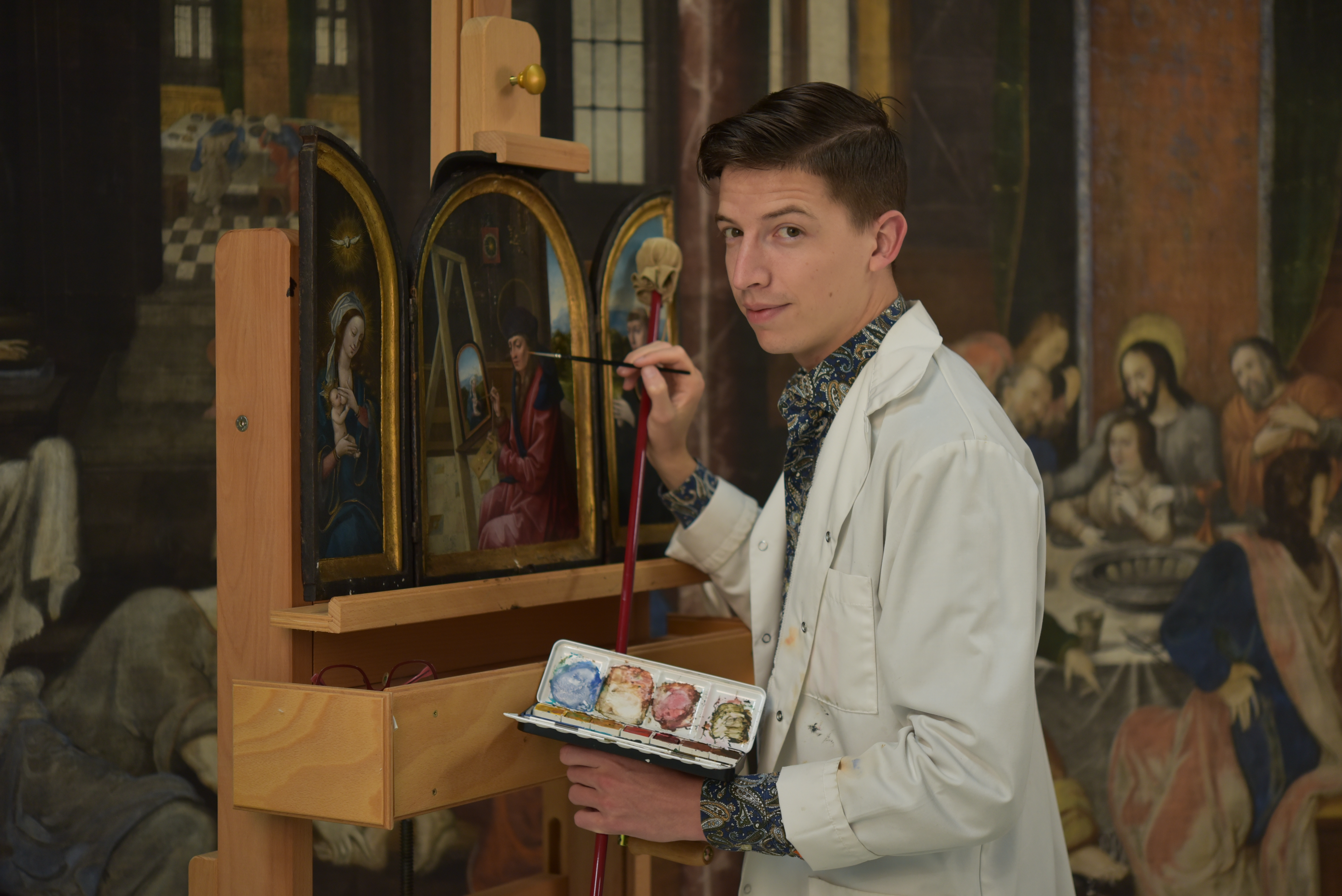
Restoration of a 16th-century triptych of 'Saint Luke painting the Madonna'

Zot van Dymphna is a large-scale research and restoration campaign on the 'Dymphna altarpiece' by Goswen Van der Weyden, the grandson of the famous Rogier. This monumental altar comes from the Norbertine abbey of Tongerlo near Geel and has been part of the collection of the Phoebus Foundation since 2010. The restoration treatment takes place between 2017 and 2020.

Thuis bij Jacob Jordaens is another research project. In 1652 Jacob Jordaens painted a series of ceiling pieces about the love story of Amor and Psyche for his spacious home in Antwerp. These paintings have been recognized as masterpieces by the Flemish Community. For the first time in art history they are being restored and explored extensively.

== Exhibitions ==
The Phoebus Foundation aims to ensure maximal accessibility of the collection to the widest possible audience. Therefore, the chancellery regularly organizes exhibitions:

=== 3500 years of textile art (Enduring) ===
Since 2011, this permanent exhibition in Antwerp shows fabrics, clothing and archaeological findings from ancient Egypt, Rome and the Silk Road. In collaboration with The Phoebus Foundation and Katoen Natie, an international congress by the name 'Textiles from the Nile Valley' is also organized here every two years. The company also finances the publication of the conference bundles.

=== OER. The roots of Flanders (March–August 2017) ===
This exhibition was organized in the Caermers Monastery in Ghent. OER talked about a tipping point in art and cultural history, and took the visitor to the early 20th century. In a separate scenography, works from the collection of The Phoebus Foundation were shown here, alongside masterpieces from Flemish private collections, such as, the collection of Herman De Bode. This collection was acquired almost integrally in 2018 by The Phoebus Foundation.

=== The Birth of Capitalism: The Golden age of Flanders (June 2016 – January 2017) ===
This exhibition in the Caermers Monastery in Ghent took the visitor through the five golden centuries of the Southern Netherlands, ending at the Eighty Years' War. This exhibition not only showed pieces from The Phoebus Foundation, but also from The Royal Museum of Fine Arts Antwerp, the MAS, the Royal Library Albert I and the GroeningeMuseum. There were works by Hans Memling, Jan Gossaert and Peter Paul Rubens. This exhibition was not undisputed. Opponents talked about the 'marketing of public cultural activities'. At the opening, they therefore organized a symbolic funeral procession.

=== VOSSEN: Expedition in the land of Reynaert (May–September 2018) ===
The large collection of Reynaert the Fox was exhibited in 2018 in the form of an 'expedition' about the medieval animal epic. The expedition takes visitors on a cycling tour of 40 to 60 km through the Flemish Waasland and the Dutch Zeelandic Flanders. During this experience, the visitors get to know the medieval story of Reynaert the Fox in a playful and accessible way.

=== Daniel Seghers (1590–1661) in the Keizerskapel (August–September 2018) ===
After the presentation of the triptych with Saint Luke painting the Madonna, The Phoebus Foundation focuses on another piece from its collection: a floral still life by Daniël Seghers (1590–1661). His art was heavily sought after by the European nobility during the first half of the 17th century. According to the famous poet Constantijn Huyghens, you could almost smell the flowers displayed on the paintings. Today, Daniël Seghers is hardly known to the public. With this new thematic exhibition, the Phoebus Foundation wants to draw attention to this painter.

=== Lace is More! (May–November 2019) ===
"Lace is More! offered a historical survey of lace production from the sixteenth century to the present, while also surprising visitors with contemporary lace artworks. A selection of masterpieces from the old master collection combined with textile fragments, contemporary art and haute couture told the unique story of this home-grown Flemish luxury product. Lace is inextricably linked with the history of Flanders. Nowhere in the world do these precious family heirlooms, passed down from generation to generation, have such a unique character as here."

=== The Bold and the Beautiful (March 2020–April 2021) ===
"The many portraits in The Phoebus Foundation collection from the Middle Ages to the early modern era formed the ideal starting point from which to tell the fascinating story of portrait art."

=== From Memling to Rubens: The Golden Age of Flanders (April 2021–November 2021) ===
"From Memling to Rubens showed Flemish art from the fifteenth, sixteenth and seventeenth centuries as you have never seen it before. The exhibition was a journey through three hundred years of cultural history, with breathtaking masterpieces from the collection of The Phoebus Foundation in the leading role. Unknown gems by Hans Memling, Quinten Metsys, Peter Paul Rubens, Jacob Jordaens and Anthony Van Dyck took you to a world full of folly and sin, fascination and ambition. From Memling to Rubens was about dukes and emperors, about rich citizens and poor saints, about art rooms as wine cellars and about Antwerp as Hollywood on the Scheldt."

=== Crazy about Dymphna: The Story of a Girl Who Drove a Medieval City Mad (April 2021–November 2021) ===
"Following several years of intensive research, The Phoebus Foundation has embarked on a large-scale conservation project: the magisterial St Dymphna Altar, a masterpiece by Goossen Van der Weyden, grandson of the celebrated Flemish Primitive painter Rogier Van der Weyden. Goossen created the altarpiece for Abbot Antoon Tsgrooten of the Norbertine Abbey in Tongerlo. It tells the tragic story of Dymphna, an Irish princess and patron saint of the mentally ill, who is venerated in the town of Geel, in the Kempen region of Flanders.

In the five hundred years since it was painted, the altarpiece has been cut down, neglected, vandalized, stolen and forgotten. The Phoebus Foundation recently decided to go ahead with a thorough restoration, the results of which can now be presented to the public.

In 2021 the panels were being hosted by Niguliste Museum in Tallinn (Estonia), where an interactive scenography immersed the visitor in the Irish saint’s extraordinary world. Visitors could discover the exceptional stories, forgotten for centuries, that unfolded beneath the layers of dust and dirt, while experiencing the unique history of a monumental altarpiece."

=== At Home with Jordaens (October 2021–May 2022) ===
"In cooperation with the Frans Hals Museum, The Phoebus Foundation presents the exhibition At home with Jordaens: the first monographic exhibition of the seventeenth-century Antwerp master Jacob Jordaens in the Netherlands."

=== Crazy about Dymphna: The Story of a Girl who Drove a Medieval City Mad (April–October 2022) ===
The Phoebus Foundation returned with their Dymphna exhibition to Geel, where the exhibition was held in St Dymphna's Church. Due to its success, Crazy about Dymphna has been extended by a little bit longer than a month.

=== Saints, Sinners, Lovers, and Fools: 300 Years of Flemish Masterworks (October 2022–January 2023) ===
In collaboration with Denver Art Museum, The Phoebus Foundation organized a new exhibition in which their 15th- to 17th-century masterpieces will be presented to a new audience in the U.S., revealing the fascinating world of various artists from the Southern Netherlands.

== Loans ==
In addition to organizing exhibitions, The Phoebus Foundation often gives works on loan to museums at home and abroad. For example, works by the foundation were given on long-term loan to the Antwerp Rubens House, the Museum aan de Stroom (Antwerp), DIVA (Antwerp), the Rockox & Snydershuis (Antwerp), and to the Art Institute in Chicago. The foundation also cooperates with the Antwerp Keizerskapel. The Phoebus Foundation also lends short-term artifacts to temporary exhibitions such as the Teseum in Tongeren.

=== Coptic textiles in the Teseum in Tongeren ===
In the second half of 2018 an exhibition of eighty Coptic objects from the Phoebus Foundation took place in the treasury of the Teseum in Tongeren. The exhibition featured craft items such as clothing, fabrics and tools. Furthermore, it showed Coptic texts, pottery and household objects.

== Publications ==
=== Books ===
- Crazy about Dymphna, Sven Van Dorst, 2020
- The Bold and the Beautiful, Katharina Van Cauteren, 2020
- From Memling to Rubens, Katharina Van Cauteren, 2020
- OER: De wortels van Vlaanderen, Katharina Van Cauteren, 2017
- Golden Times: Wealth and status in the Middle Ages in the southern Low Countries, Véronique Lambert and Peter Stabel, 2016
- Politics as Painting: Hendrick De Clerck (1560–1630) and the imperial ambitions of the archdukes Albrecht and Isabella, Katharina Van Cauteren, 2016
- The Birth of Capitalism: The Golden age of Flanders, Katharina Van Cauteren and Fernand Huts, 2016
- Kunst uit Latijns-Amerika: Modern en hedendaags, Laurens Dhaenens, 2015
- 3500 jaar textielkunst, Antoine De Moor, 2008

=== Phoebus Focus ===
In September 2017, the foundation started publishing a series of scientific publications in which gems from the collection are put in the spotlight. Hereby, for each new publication, art historians who specialize in the theme in question are called upon and can tell the story in a fascinating and accessible way.

- Phoebus Focus I: Saint Luke painting the Madonna, Niels Schalley & Sven Van Dorst, 2017
- Phoebus Focus II: Kitchen still life with Christ in the home of Martha and Mary, Prisca Valkeneers, 2018
- Phoebus Focus III: The allegory of the seven liberal arts, Hildegard Van de Velde, 2018
- Phoebus Focus IV: Reynaert de vos, Niels Schalley, 2018
- Phoebus Focus V: The lake monster of Tagua Tagua, Katharina Van Cauteren, 2018
- Phoebus Focus VI: Flower vase with roses, daffodils and tulips, Sven Van Dorst, 2018
- Phoebus Focus VII: Attack on Travellers, Leen Kelchtermans, 2019
- Phoebus Focus VIII: Apollo on His Sun Chariot, Hans Vlieghe, 2019
- Phoebus Focus IX: Elegant Company in a Garden, Timothy De Paepe, 2019
- Phoebus Focus X: Portrait of a Young Woman, Leen Kelchtermans, 2019
- Phoebus Focus XI: Keep Your Mouth Shut, Larry Silver, 2020
- Phoebus Focus XII: Madonna and Child, Marjan Debaene, 2020
- Phoebus Focus XIII: Biblia Regia Printed on Vellum, Dirk Imhof, 2020
- Phoebus Focus XIV: Bird, Naomi Meulemans, 2019
- P hoebus Focus XV: A Sailor and a Woman Embracing, Nils Büttner, 2020
- Phoebus Focus XVI: Descrittione di Tutti i Paesi Bassi, Dina Aristodemo, 2020
- Phoebus Focus XVII: Hairnets, Hoods and Caps, Petra Linscheid, 2020
- Phoebus Focus XVIII: Portrait of Elisabeth Jordaens, Leen Kelchtermans, 2020
- Phoebus Focus XIX: Study of a Young Woman, Katrijn Van Bragt & Sven Van Dorst, 2020
- Phoebus Focus XX: The Lamentation of the Dying Mary Magdalene, Lieke Wijnia, 2020
- Phoebus Focus XXI: Portrait of a Gentleman, Lara Yeager-Crasselt, 2021
- Phoebus Focus XXII: Stoning of Saint Paul and Scourging of Saint Paul, Madeleine Manderyck, Jan Van Damme & Zsuzsanna van Ruyven-Zeman, 2021
- Phoebus Focus XXIII: Patershol in Ghent, Inge Misschaert, 2021
- Phoebus Focus XXIV: Portrait of Emperor Servius Sulpicius Galba, Nils Büttner, 2021
- Phoebus Focus XXV: Saint Begga, Leen Kelchtermans, 2021
- Phoebus Focus XXVI: Pleurants, Matthew Reeves, 2022
- Phoebus Focus XXVII: Portrait of Henricus Liberti, Timothy De Paepe, 2022
- Phoebus Focus XXVIII: Flowers in a Vase with a Clump of Cyclamen and Precious Stones, Sven Van Dorst, 2022
- Phoebus Focus XXIX: War Lace, Wendy Wiertz, 2022
- Phoebus Focus XXX: Susanna and the Elders, Katharina Van Cauteren, 2022
- Focus XXXI: Head-Baker, Wendy Wauters, 2023
- Focus XXXII: Kursaal and Promenade, Anne Adriaens-Pannier, 2023
- Focus XXXIII: Portrait of Johannes Gansacker I, Leen Kelchtermans, 2023
- Focus XXXIV: Vase of Flowers with Vanitas Symbols, Sven Van Dorst, 2023
- Focus XXXV: The Holy Family in Nazareth, Katharina Van Cauteren, 2023
- Focus XXXVI: Amorphous Figures, Naomi Meulemans, 2024
- Focus XXXVII: Portrait of Lady Dering, Katharina Van Cauteren, 2025
- Focus XXXVIII: Mercury Bearing Psyche To Mount Olympus, Larry Silver, 2025
- Focus XXXIX: Mary of Burgundy Distributing Alms, Jan Dirk Baetens, 2025
- Focus XL: Portrait of Mary Sidney Herbert, Leen Kelchtermans, 2025
- Focus XLI: Two Fisherboys, Anna Tummers & Lotte Kokkedee, 2025
