= Jules Schmalzigaug =

Belgian futurist painter

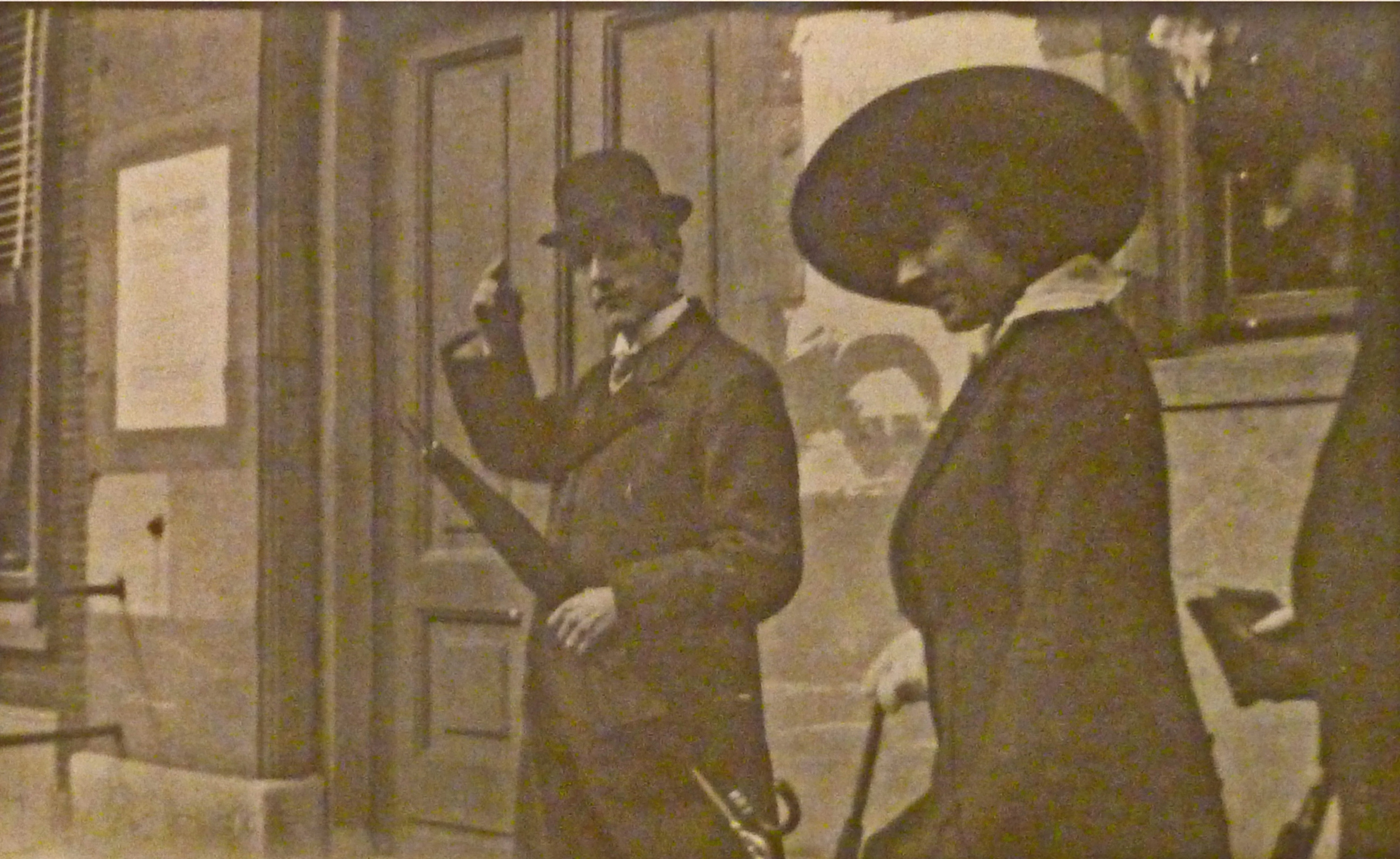
Jules Schmalzigaug (ca. 1905)

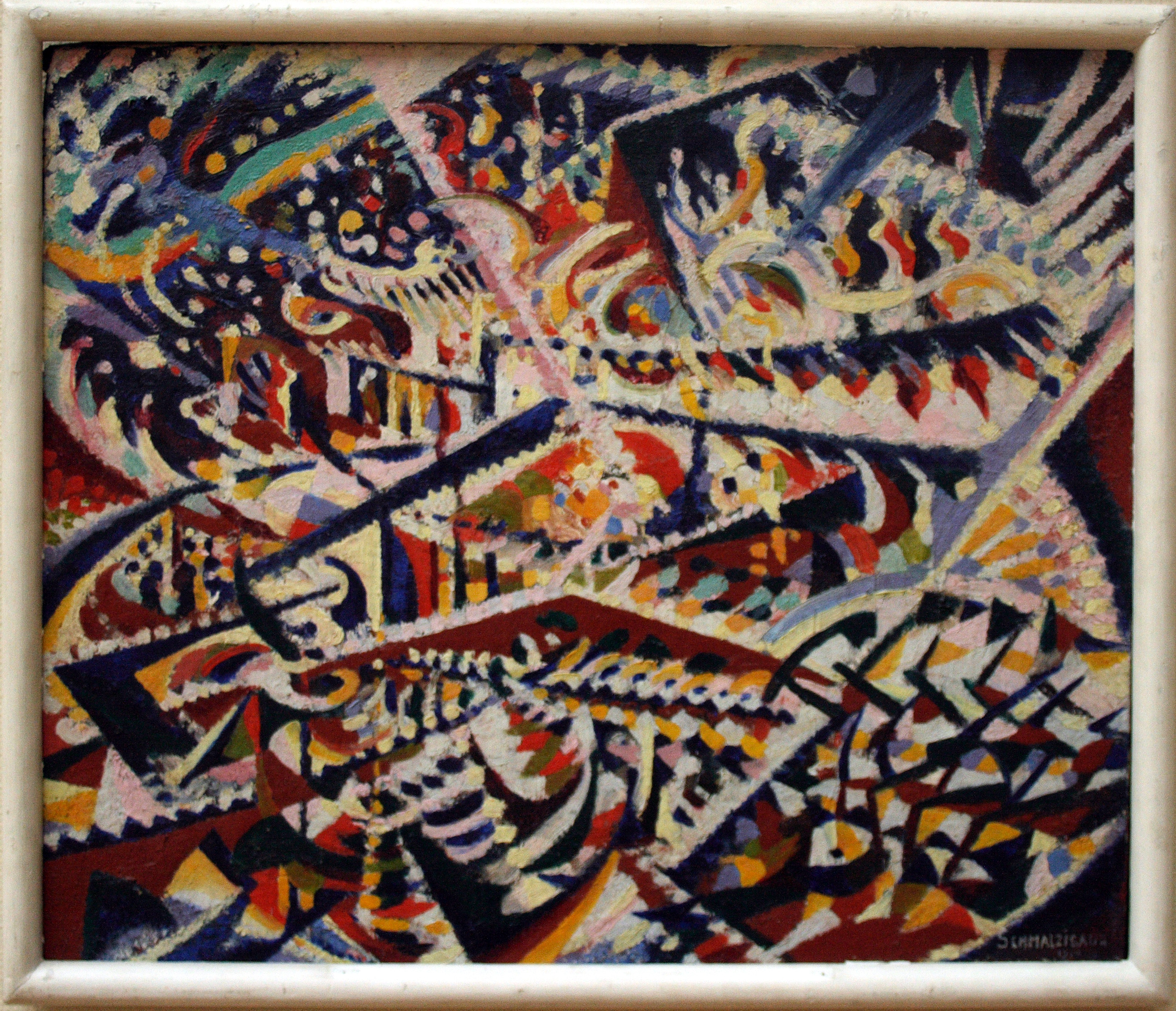
Impressions in a Dance Hall

Jules Schmalzigaug (1882 or 1883 in Antwerp – 13 May 1917 in The Hague) was a Belgian futurist painter.

== Biography ==
His well-to-do family came from Germany and lived in Antwerp. From the age of 16, Schmalzigaug travelled extensively. In 1905–1906 he made a tour of Italy, where he was especially impressed and influenced by Venice.

Returning to Antwerp, he became a secretary to the art society of Kunst van Heden/L'Art Contemporain, and worked on the organisation of international exhibitions. Between 1910 and 1912 he lived mainly in Paris. There he had the opportunity to see the exhibition of Italian futurists in 1912, and, impressed, soon decided to move to Italy.

His time in Italy between 1912 and 1914 was the happiest and most active part of his life and art. In 1914 he took part in the international exhibition of futurists in Rome. His style developed towards the abstract.

In 1914, he returned to Antwerp. He was declared unfit for military service on health grounds; after the start of World War I, he moved to The Hague in neutral Netherlands.

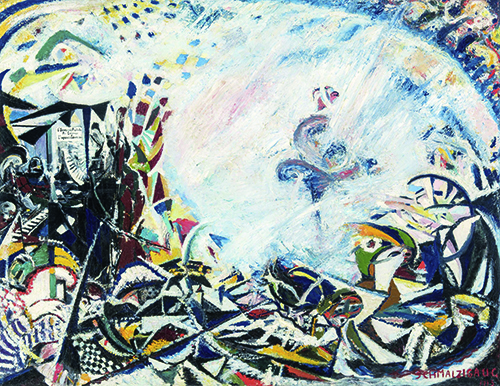
The dynamic of dance, 1913, The Phoebus Foundation

He felt lonely in the country which he perceived as isolated; he longed for the whirring international life of artists in Venice.

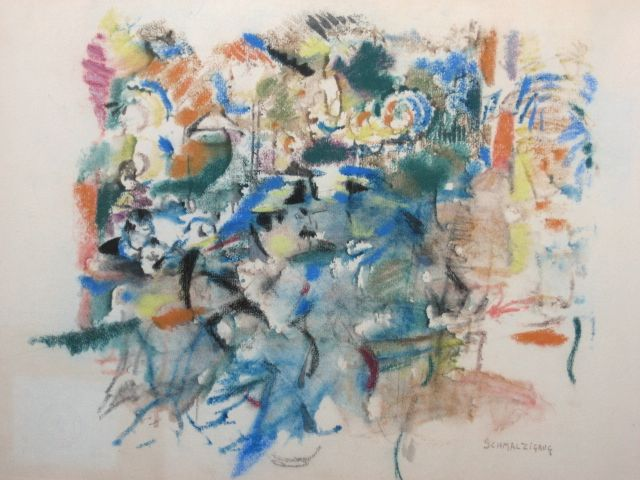
Terrace

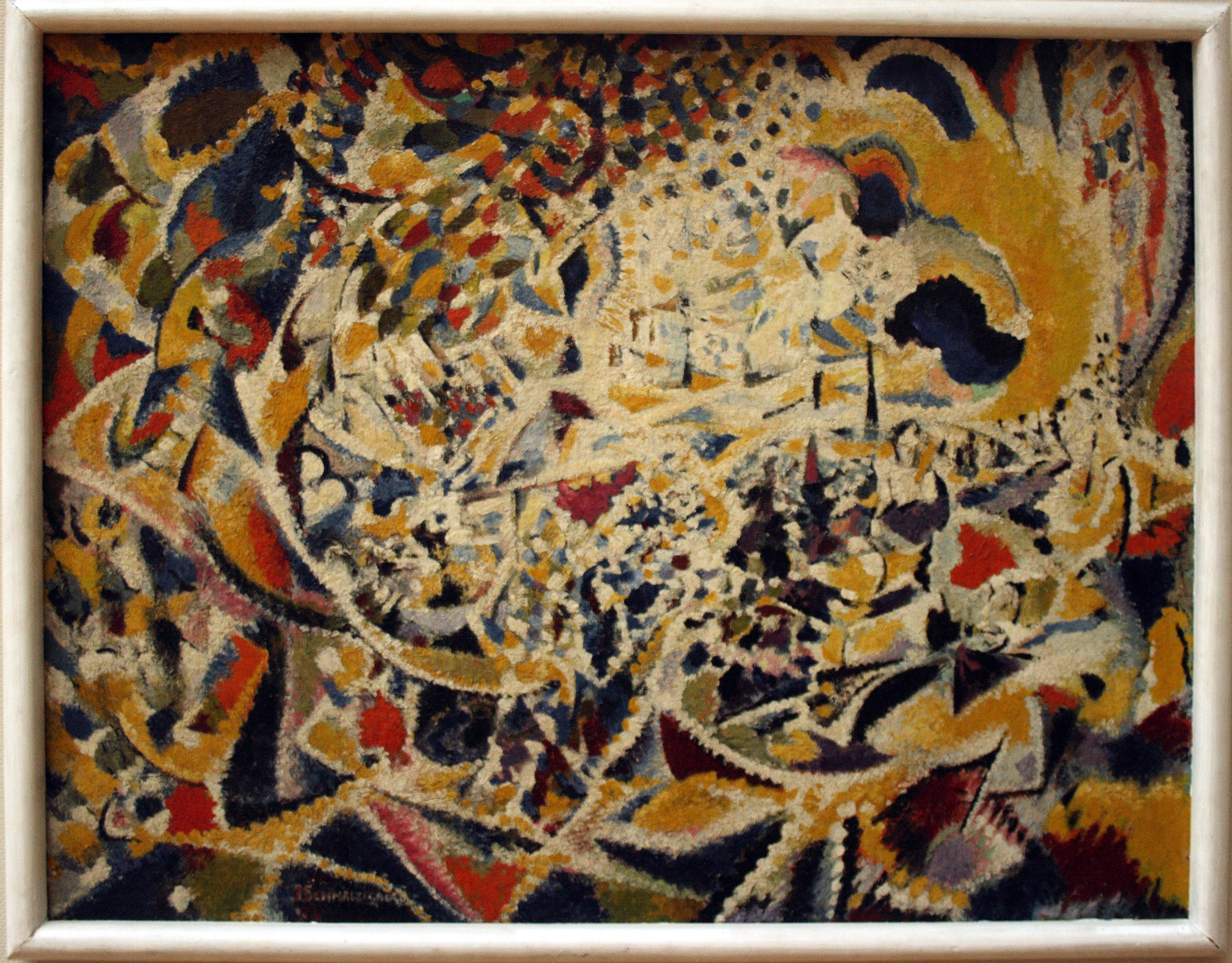
Light

In his art he returned to figurative painting, but his works from this period did not reach the previous level of success. He fell into depression, and in 1917 eventually committed suicide.

== Legacy ==
The British art historian Michael Palmer has written that Schmalzigaug has not received great acknowledgement in his life neither in Belgium, nor internationally, but in spite of this he belonged to the most original and most talented modern Belgian artists of his time.

His works can be seen in the Royal Museum of Fine Arts, Antwerp, the Royal Museums of Fine Arts of Belgium in Brussels, and the Provincial Museum of Modern Art in Ostend.

== Sources ==
- Phil Mertens, Jules Schmalzigaug, 1882-1917, Antwerp and Brussels, 1984
- Michael Palmer, Van Ensor tot Magritte, Belgische kunst 1880–1940, Brussels and Tielt, 2002
