= Aguila (artist) =

Belgian artist

Aguila (born Jan Gielens; January 15, 1937 in Melsbroek, Belgium) is an artist, industrial designer, and founder of the "probability reality", a new art trend in contemporary art. His works consists of paintings, monumental sculpture, monumental installations, conceptual architecture and new concepts on naval design and computer art.

== Education ==
Aguila studied visual and monumental art at the Higher Institute for Arts and Sciences in St Lucas, Brussels under such artists as Jos De Maegd and Maurits Van Saene. During the last year of his art education Aguila came to the conclusion that rather than focus on color, priority should be given to strong compositional elements and the contact the painting had with the environment, extending the composition of the work to the three-dimensional environment.

Aguila discovered industrial design as a student of Professor Elno (1920–1998). He studied industrial design first at L'Ecole Nationale Supérieure des Arts Visuels de la Cambre in Brussels and then at the Academy for Industrial Design in Eindhoven, the Netherlands. He later practiced industrial design in Germany.

== Early works ==
Beginning in 1965, Aguila worked as an independent industrial designer for various European industries including Philips – Telecom, Hilson, Bumaco, Brugman, Pirelli Brussels, Verbrughe (furniture), and Munar Antwerp, Belgium. For one of his package designs, Gielens was awarded the Howard Design Award. During the same period, he also worked as the Industrial Design advisor at Febelhout, which is the Belgian Federation of Belgian, wood-using industries, Brussels (Belgium). In 1972, with Belgian architect, Bob Van Reeth, he designed his residence in Brussels, Belgium.

In 1974, Aguila was invited to exhibit his paintings at the University of Ghent. The former conservator of the Museum for Modern Art in Brussels, Phil Mertens, became interested in Aguila's painting, and recognized him as the leader of a new direction in contemporary art, coined, "Multidimensional Transparent Art".

Aguila later was invited to work as a teacher and lecturer at Cool international school in Brussels from 1977 to 1980, and from 1977 to 1999 at Universidad Las Colinas in Elche, Spain, where he was time engaged full-time, teaching courses and giving conferences based on his knowledge of painting, conceptual architecture, and landscape art . The painting classes were soon being called "The School of Ilicitis", called after Ilice, the ancient name for Elche. Ilicitis means City of Light. The campus of the university was constructed by Gielens and his architecture students amongst the many palm trees, using very light structures and materials.

== Building and art design ==
The social facet of this cultural artistic movement, is present all over and the aggregation of the multiple facets and disciplines gives birth to a living monumental work of art called "A Creation of the free will", started 1977 and is ongoing until present. This monumental work of art is composed of multi disciplinary works of art, sculpture, installations, design, philosophy and architecture. In July 2001, Gielens was awarded the "Premio Juanito Laguna la trayectoria artistic" for the totality of his oeuvre by the Volpens-Stessens foundation in Buenos Aires, Argentina.
