= Goswin van der Weyden =

Early Netherlandish painter

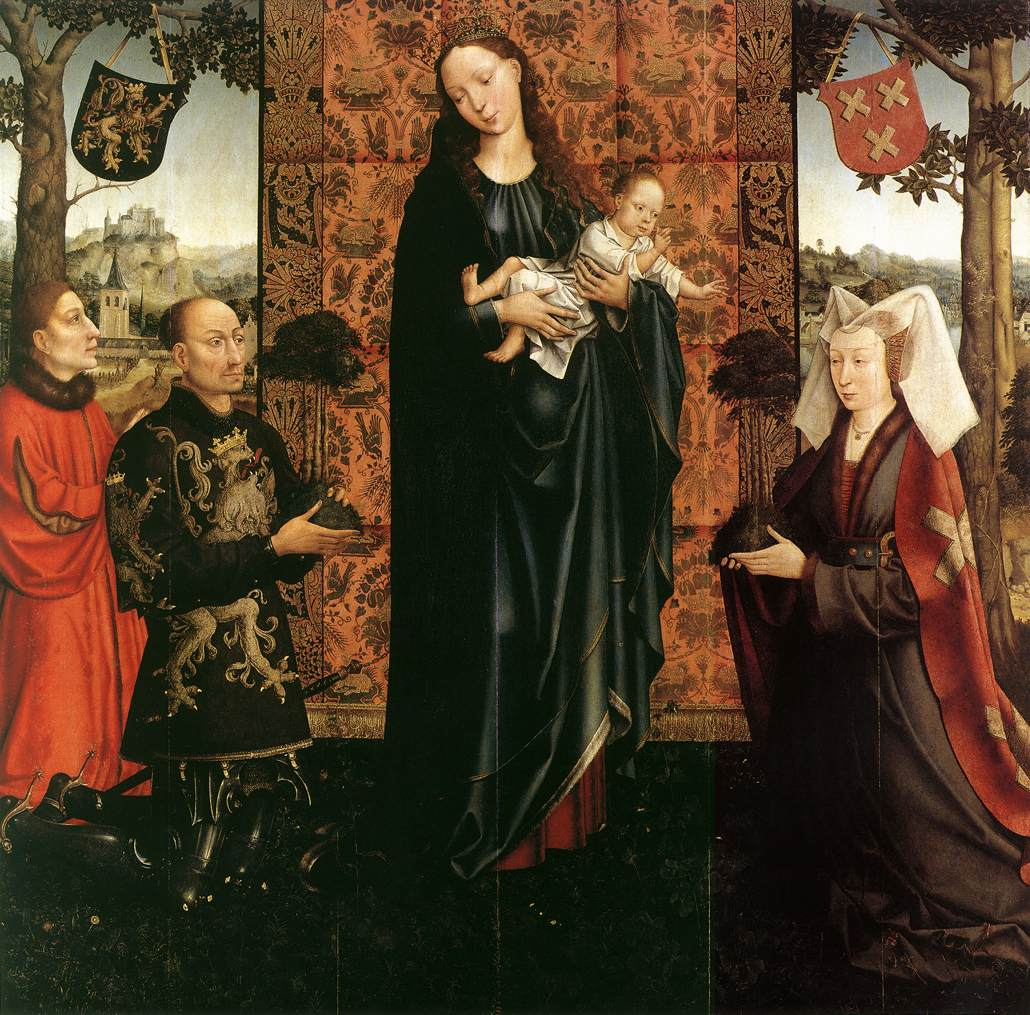
- The Gift of Kalmthout (1511)
- Born: 1455, Brussels,
- Died: 1543, Antwerp
- Style: Antwerp Mannerism

Goswin van der Weyden or Goossen van der Weyden (1455–1543) was a Flemish Renaissance painter active in Antwerp. He was one of several artists from Brussels who assisted in the transmission to Antwerp of the traditions of the Brussels school founded by his grandfather, Rogier van der Weyden. He thus played an important role in the founding of the Antwerp school.

== Life ==
He was born in Brussels and was the grandson of Rogier van der Weyden. He probably trained in the workshop of his father Pieter who was a son of Rogier van Weyden. He later left Brussels and lived in Lier from 1492. Here he led a successful workshop. He completed various commissions for the local Saint Gummarus Church.

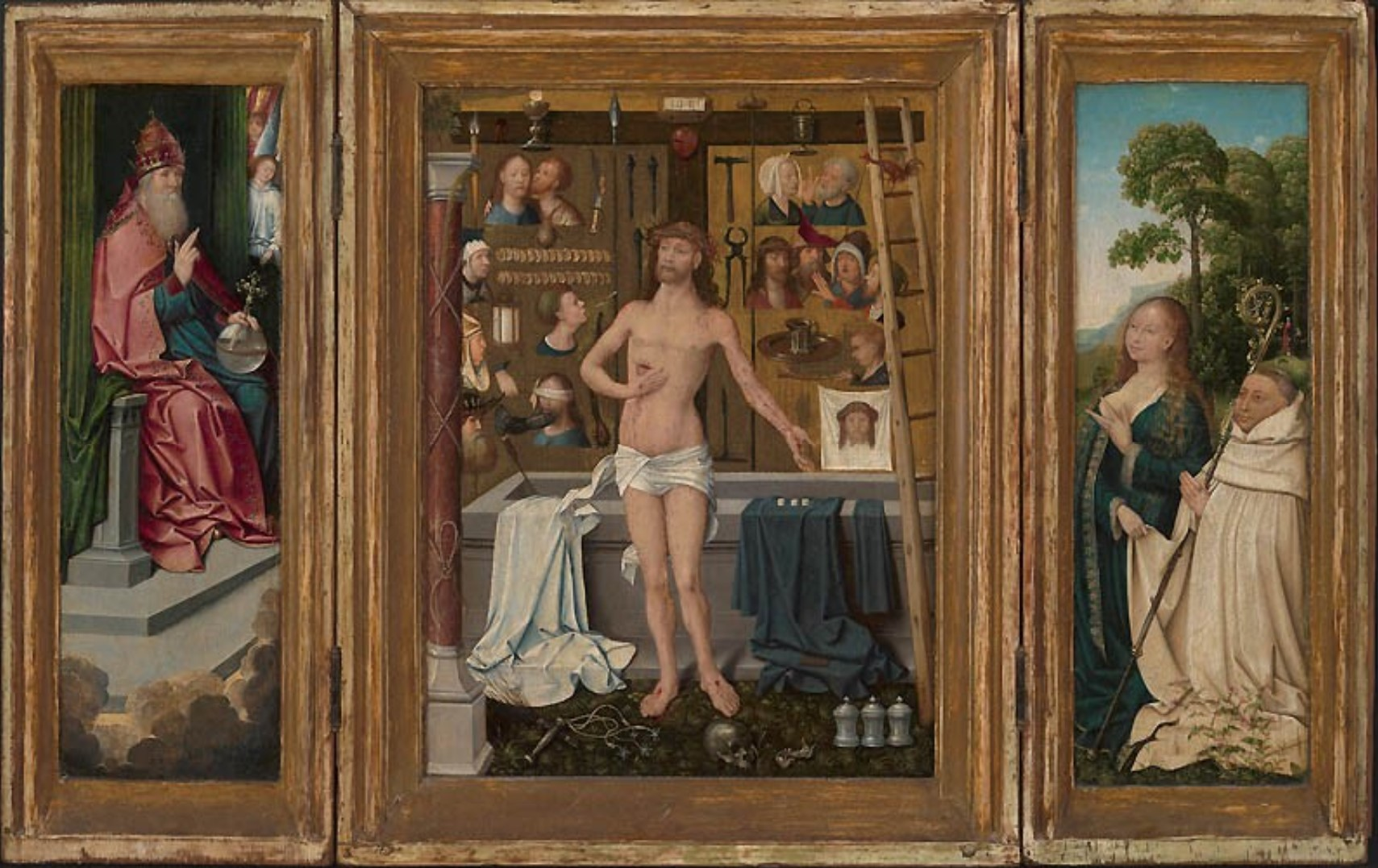
Triptych of Antonius Tsgrooten

He finally moved to Antwerp in 1500. He became a poorter (citizen) of Antwerp in the year 1499-1500 under the name ‘Goessen vand[er] Weyden'. He likely enrolled in the Antwerp's Guild of Saint Luke in the guild year 1500-1501 (the records of the Guild for that period have apparently been lost). He took on a number of apprentices beginning in the year 1503-1504 and the last one in 1522–1523. His son, Rogier was also one of his pupils.

Goswin operated a large workshops in Antwerp. He lived for a long time in the Huidevettersstraat in Antwerp a property of the Abbey of Tongerlo. He painted various works for this monastery, some of which have been preserved. He was still alive in 1538.

== Work ==
The known oeuvre of Goswin van der Weyden is limited. Whereas about 40 works have been attributed to the artist, many of the attributions are not unanimously accepted. Attributions of works are based on a few works for which there are documents to prove the authorship. His best documented works are the Triptych of Antonius Tsgrooten (1507, Koninklijk Museum voor Schone Kunsten Antwerpen), The Life of Saint Dymphna (1505, The Phoebus Foundation), both painted for the Abbey of Tongerlo, and The Gift of Kalmthout (1513, Gemäldegalerie, Berlin) painted for the same abbey in 1513.

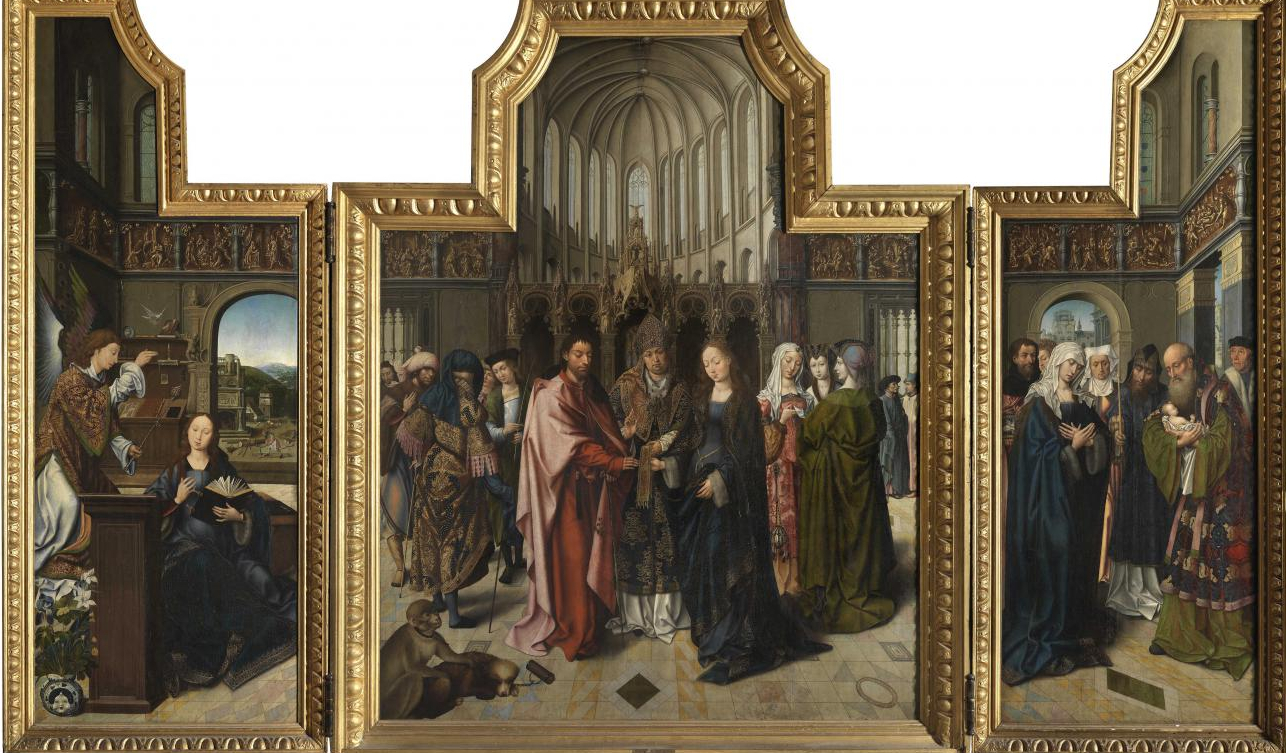
Colibrant triptych

Goswin was not an innovator. His style is archaic as it continues that was established by his grandfather Rogier and continued by his father in Brussels. He shows some influences of other artists such as Gerard David.
