= Meylandt Castle =

Castle in Belgium

Coordinates: 51.020°N 5.281°E

- Belgium
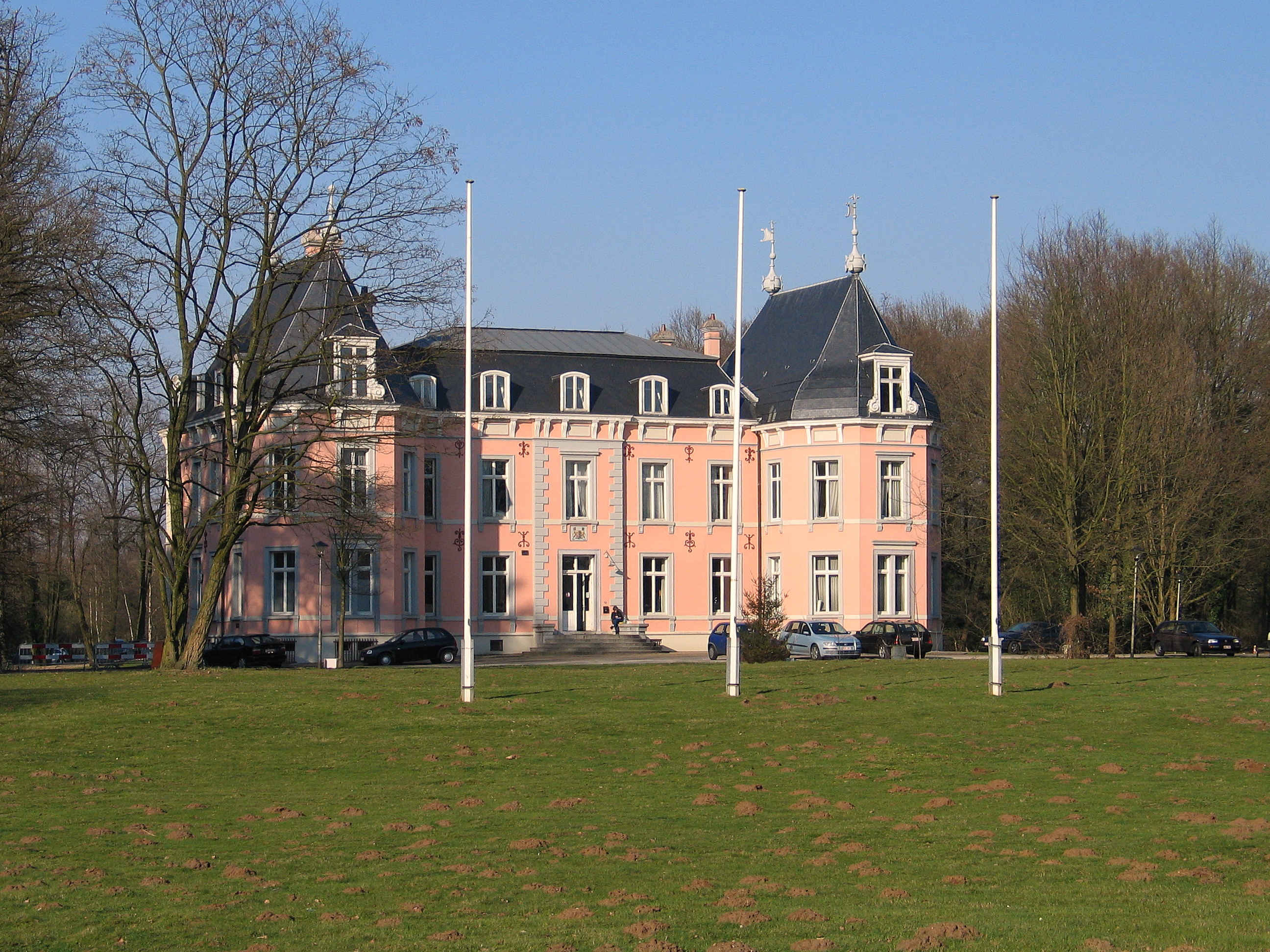

Site information
- Type: Castle

Meylandt Castle (Dutch: Kasteel Meylandt) is a country house, on the site of an earlier castle, in Heusden in the municipality of Heusden-Zolder, province of Limburg, Belgium.

Although the site has been in use since the 1380s at the latest, the present building was constructed in 1907, replacing an earlier house of 1842.

== See also ==
- List of castles in Belgium
