= Perk, Belgium =

Perk
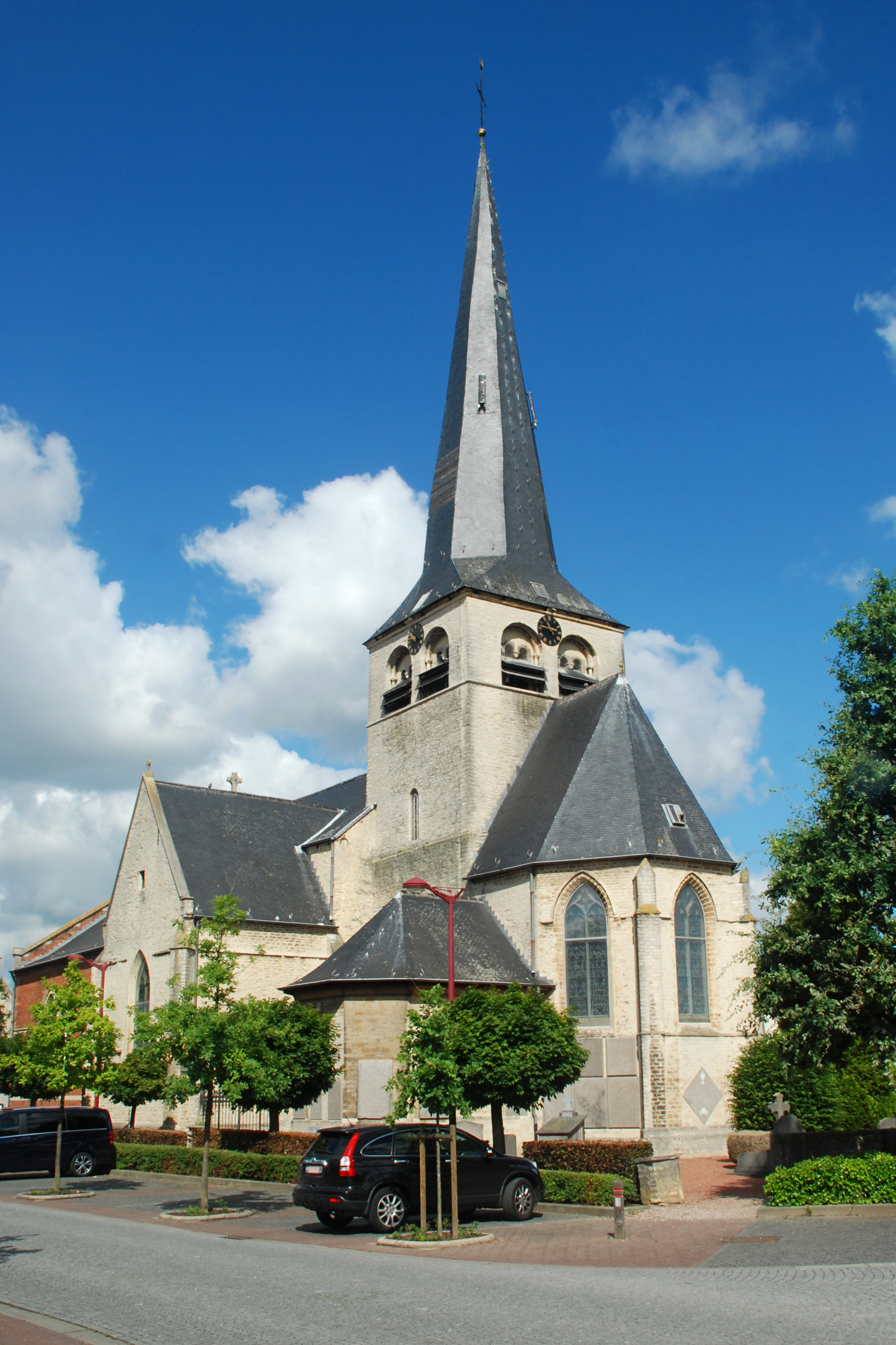
- Perk, the village church

- Location within Belgium Location within Europe
- Coordinates: 50°56′00″N 04°29′49″E
- Country: Belgium
- Region: Flanders
- Province: Flemish Brabant
- Municipality: Steenokkerzeel

Perk is a village and a district in the municipality of Steenokkerzeel, in East Flanders, Belgium.

The village developed around an intersection of roads, including the Roman road connecting Mechelen with Gembloux. The village church is medieval; its oldest part, the tower, dates from the 12th century. There is also a castle, the Kasteel de Ribaucourt, in Perk.

Archbishop Pierre-Lambert Goossens was born in Perk.
