= Heusden-Zolder =

- Municipality
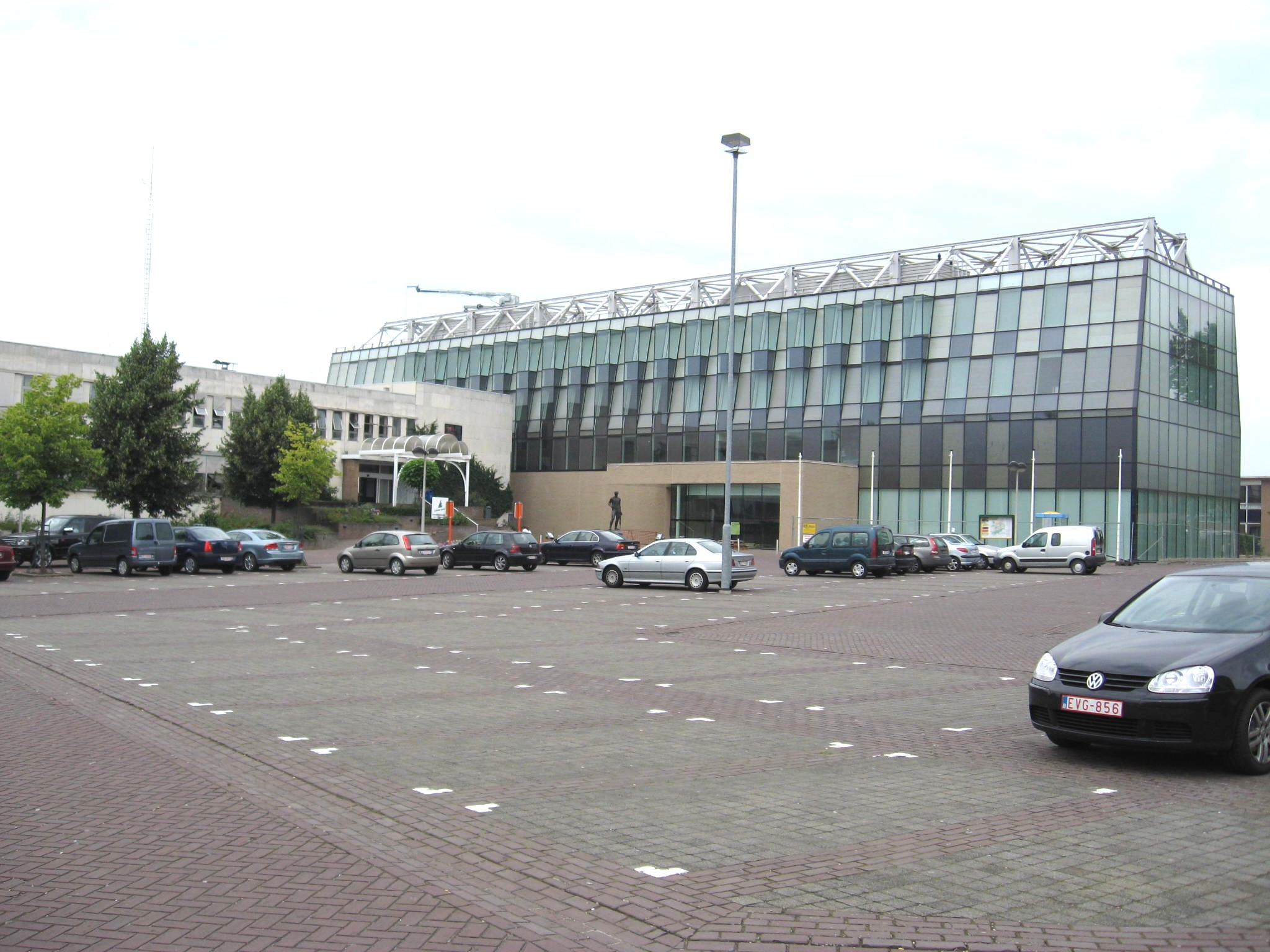
- Heusden-Zolder town hall

- Flag Coat of arms

- Location of Heusden-Zolder in Limburg
- Interactive map of Heusden-Zolder
- Location in Belgium
- Coordinates: 51°03′N 05°17′E
- Country: Belgium
- Community: Flemish Community
- Region: Flemish Region
- Province: Limburg
- Arrondissement: Hasselt

Government
  - Mayor: Mario Borremans
  - Governing parties: GOED, N-VA

Area
  - Total: 53.4 km^{2} (20.6 sq mi)

Population (2018-01-01)
  - Total: 33,406
  - Density: 626/km^{2} (1,620/sq mi)
- Postal codes: 3550
- NIS code: 71070
- Area codes: 011
- Website: www.heusden-zolder.be

Heusden-Zolder (Flemish: [ˌɦøːzdə(n) ˈzɔldər]; Limburgish: Heuze-Zolder [ˌɦøːzəˈzɔldəʀ]) is a municipality located in the Belgian province of Limburg near Hasselt. In 2006, Heusden-Zolder had a total population of 30,769. The total area is 53.23 km^{2} which gives a population density of 578 inhabitants per km^{2}.

Heusden-Zolder was the result of the merger on 1 January 1977 of the two former municipalities of Heusden and Zolder, and currently consists of the former Heusden parishes of Heusden centre, Berkenbos and Eversel, and the former Zolder parishes of Zolder centre, Boekt, Viversel, Bolderberg and Lindeman.

Heusden-Zolder is home to almost 2,000 immigrants from all over the world. This is due to the (now closed) coal mine of Zolder. During the 1960s Belgian coal mines faced an enormous shortage of employees. To address this problem, foreigner labourers were encouraged to immigrate and work near the mines. After their closure (the mine in Zolder was the last one in Belgium, the Netherlands and Luxemburg to close in 1992) most of the immigrants chose to stay, which makes Heusden-Zolder a relatively multicultural place.

== Local infrastructure ==
The town hall, a large glass construction, is located in Zolder centre since the merger. As a compromise, the former town hall of Heusden is now used instead by the local social security department (OCMW).

Heusden-Zolder has one hospital, the Sint-Franciscusziekenhuis.

Heusden-Zolder has one secondary school, Sint-Franciscuscollege, which operates from a single campus in Berkenbos. The school was previously spread across two campuses, but all educational activities were consolidated on the renovated Berkenbos campus on 1 September 2016.

Heusden-Zolder also has 2 railway stations, one called "Zolder station" and the other one "Heusden station". The town is easily accessible via the Albert Canal and the highway E314 and has therefore several industrial zones, such as 'Zolder-Lummen'.

== Places of interest ==
- Meylandt Castle, a castle donated to Heusden-Zolder by the De Theux de Meylandt family. It is currently used as an art school.

== Famous activities ==
- De Revue, comical theatre play in the Heusden dialect.
- The Grand Prix Erik De Vlaeminck Heusden-Zolder is a UCI Cyclo-cross World Cup competition traditionally held on Boxing Day.

== Sport ==
- De Veen, an athletics stadium that yearly hosts the KBC Night of Athletics, the second most important athletics meeting in Belgium after the world famous Memorial Van Damme in Brussels.
- The Circuit Terlaemen, was the former Formula One home to the Belgian Grand Prix and host of the 2007 Belgian Champ Car Grand Prix.
- The 1969 and 2002 UCI Road World Championships, the 2002 and 2016 UCI Cyclo-cross World Championships and the 2003 Motocross des Nations were held at the Circuit Terlaemen.
- The Speedway Club Helzold hold motorcycle speedway events at the Helzold Stadium, located at the intersection of Stadionlaan and Helzoldlaan. The stadium has hosted important events, including Netherlands and Belgian qualifying rounds of the Speedway World Championship (starting in 1987).

== Climate ==
Heusden-Zolder has an oceanic climate due to Gulf Stream influence, in spite of its inland position. The municipality is in the region with the warmest summers in the Benelux region with 23.9 °C (75.0 °F) July average highs.

Climate data for Heusden-Zolder (1981–2010 normals, sunshine 1984–2013)
| Month | Jan | Feb | Mar | Apr | May | Jun | Jul | Aug | Sep | Oct | Nov | Dec | Year |
|---|---|---|---|---|---|---|---|---|---|---|---|---|---|
| Mean daily maximum °C (°F) | 6.0 (42.8) | 6.8 (44.2) | 10.6 (51.1) | 14.4 (57.9) | 19.0 (66.2) | 21.5 (70.7) | 23.9 (75.0) | 23.5 (74.3) | 19.5 (67.1) | 15.1 (59.2) | 9.8 (49.6) | 6.4 (43.5) | 14.6 (58.3) |
| Daily mean °C (°F) | 3.0 (37.4) | 3.4 (38.1) | 6.6 (43.9) | 9.4 (48.9) | 13.6 (56.5) | 16.2 (61.2) | 18.5 (65.3) | 17.9 (64.2) | 14.7 (58.5) | 11.1 (52.0) | 6.7 (44.1) | 3.8 (38.8) | 10.4 (50.7) |
| Mean daily minimum °C (°F) | 0.0 (32.0) | −0.2 (31.6) | 2.2 (36.0) | 4.0 (39.2) | 8.0 (46.4) | 10.8 (51.4) | 13.0 (55.4) | 12.4 (54.3) | 9.7 (49.5) | 6.6 (43.9) | 3.2 (37.8) | 1.0 (33.8) | 5.9 (42.6) |
| Average precipitation mm (inches) | 72.3 (2.85) | 61.0 (2.40) | 66.4 (2.61) | 50.7 (2.00) | 66.4 (2.61) | 78.2 (3.08) | 78.5 (3.09) | 74.9 (2.95) | 67.1 (2.64) | 74.6 (2.94) | 75.7 (2.98) | 78.5 (3.09) | 844.5 (33.25) |
| Average precipitation days | 13.2 | 11.1 | 13.0 | 10.1 | 11.2 | 11.1 | 10.9 | 10.6 | 10.8 | 11.3 | 12.9 | 13.3 | 139.4 |
| Mean monthly sunshine hours | 57 | 73 | 120 | 167 | 201 | 195 | 207 | 197 | 139 | 115 | 62 | 45 | 1,577 |
Source: Royal Meteorological Institute

== Famous inhabitants ==
- Evil Superstars, indie rock band
- Luc Nilis, football player
- Regi Penxten, Milk Inc. and DJ
- Dries Van Langendonck, racing driver
- Dries Vanthoor, racing driver.
- Hans Vanwijn (born 1995), basketball player in the Israeli Basketball Premier League
