= Lara Yeager-Crasselt =

American art historian and curator (born 1983)

- Born: 1983 (age 42–43)
- Education: Vassar College; University of Maryland
- Occupations: Art historian, curator, researcher
- Employer: Clark Art Institute
- Known for: Seventeenth-century Dutch and Flemish art
- Notable work: Michael Sweerts (1618–1664): Shaping the Artist and the Academy in Rome and Brussels
- Title: Aso O. Tavitian Curator of Early Modern European Painting and Sculpture

Lara Yeager-Crasselt (born 1983) is an American art historian and curator specializing in seventeenth-century Dutch and Flemish art. Her scholarship addresses painting, sculpture, and tapestry in the early modern Low Countries, with particular attention to artistic exchange between the Netherlands and Italy, the mobility and identity of artists, and the work of the Flemish painter Michael Sweerts.

== Education ==
Yeager-Crasselt received a BA in history, art history, and French from Vassar College and a PhD in art history from the University of Maryland.

Yeager-Crasselt completed her dissertation at the University of Maryland under the supervision of the American art historian and curator Arthur K. Wheelock Jr. served as curator of Northern European paintings at the National Gallery of Art from 1975 until his retirement in 2018. He was succeeded in 2019 by the American curator and art historian Betsy Wieseman, who served as curator and head of the museum’s Department of Northern European Paintings until 2025.

She is specialized in the work of the Flemish painter Michael Sweerts, on whom she wrote her dissertation, which was published in 2015, as the monograph Michael Sweerts (1618–1664): Shaping the Artist and the Academy in Rome and Brussels.

== Curatorial career ==
From 2015 to 2017, Yeager-Crasselt served as interim curator of painting and sculpture at the Clark Art Institute in Williamstown, Massachusetts. During this period, she worked on exhibitions and publications devoted to European painting, including Splendor, Myth, and Vision: Nudes from the Prado, presented at the Clark in 2016.

=== The Leiden Collection ===
Yeager-Crasselt joined the Leiden Collection, a private collection of seventeenth-century Dutch paintings based in New York, as its curator in 2017. Her responsibilities included research on the collection, the development of its online scholarly catalogue, and the organization of exhibitions and institutional collaborations.

Soon after her appointment, works from the collection were shown in Masterpieces from the Leiden Collection: The Age of Rembrandt, held at the Louvre in Paris from February to May 2017. During her tenure, Yeager-Crasselt subsequently co-curated exhibitions drawn from the collection at the National Museum of China in Beijing, the Long Museum in Shanghai, the Pushkin State Museum of Fine Arts in Moscow, the State Hermitage Museum in Saint Petersburg, and Louvre Abu Dhabi.

For the 2019 Louvre Abu Dhabi exhibition, Rembrandt, Vermeer and the Dutch Golden Age: Masterpieces from the Leiden Collection and the Musée du Louvre, she co-edited the exhibition catalogue with Louvre curator Blaise Ducos and contributed essays on the collection and seventeenth-century Dutch art.

=== Baltimore Museum of Art ===
Yeager-Crasselt left the Leiden Collection in September 2022 and became curator and department head of European painting and sculpture at the Baltimore Museum of Art later that month. At Baltimore, she oversaw the museum's European painting and sculpture holdings and curated Watershed: Transforming the Landscape in Early Modern Dutch Art, which examined the role of water in the environmental, economic, and social history of the seventeenth-century Netherlands. She remained at the museum until 2025.

=== Return to Clark Art Institute ===
In 2025, Yeager-Crasselt returned to the Clark Art Institute as curator of the Aso O. Tavitian Collection, a group of European paintings, sculptures, and decorative arts given to the Clark by the Tavitian Foundation.

== Publications ==
Yeager-Crasselt's publications include:

- The Art of Being ‘au courant’: Reading the News in Dutch Genre Painting (1640-1690) (2025)
- Portrait of a Gentleman. Michael Sweerts (1618-1664) and the Elegance of Brussels Portraiture (2021)
- Changing Forms: Metamorphosis in Myth, Art, and Nature 1650–1700 (2021)
- An Inner World: Seventeenth-Century Dutch Genre Painting (2021)
- Roma 1629 (Pensieri ad Arte series) (2020)
- Rembrandt, Vermeer and the Dutch Golden Age (2019)
- The Age of Rembrandt and Vermeer: Masterpieces from The Leiden Collection (2017)
- Splendor, Myth and Vision: Nudes from the Prado (2016)
- Knowledge and Practice Pictured in the Artist’s Studio: The ‘Art Lover’ in the Seventeenth-Century Netherlands (2016)
- Michael Sweerts (1618-1664): Shaping the Artist and the Academy in Rome and Brussels (2015)
- Facts & Feelings: Retracing emotions of artists, 1600-1800 (2015)
- Dutch Paintings of the Seventeenth Century (2014)
