= Boekt =

Village in Belgium

- Village
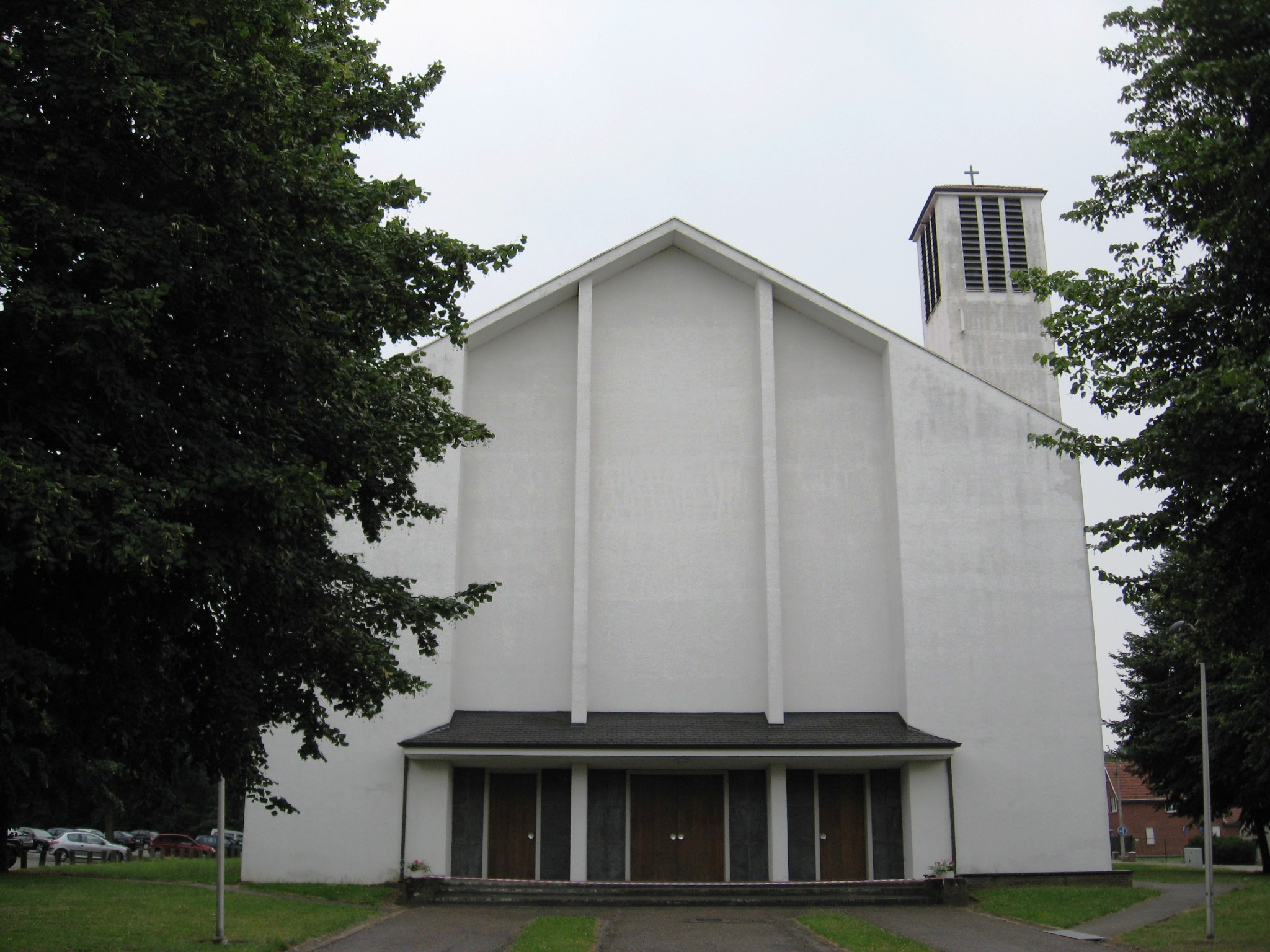
- Holy Heart Church

- Location in Belgium
- Coordinates: 51°00′43″N 5°16′48″E
- Country: Belgium
- Community: Flemish Community
- Province: Limburg
- Municipality: Heusden-Zolder

Area
  - Total: 7.34 km^{2} (2.83 sq mi)

Population (2021)
  - Total: 3,700
  - Density: 500/km^{2} (1,300/sq mi)
- Time zone: CET

Zolder is a village in/of boekt that is part of the Heusden-Zolder municipality of the Limburg province in the Flemish Community of Belgium. The village has its own village council. Boekt has a large parking lot, called Zolder centre.
