= Katoen Natie =

Logistics services company

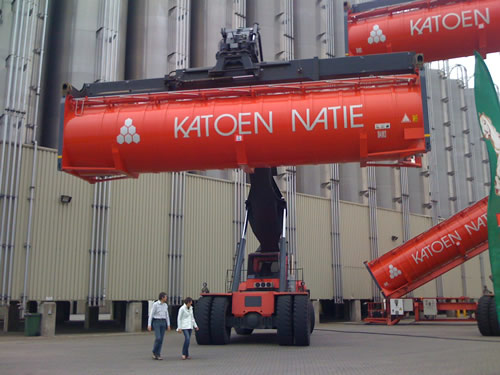
- Founded: 1854
- Headquarters: Antwerp, Belgium
- Key people: Fernand Huts
- Number of employees: 9200
- Website: www.katoennatie.com

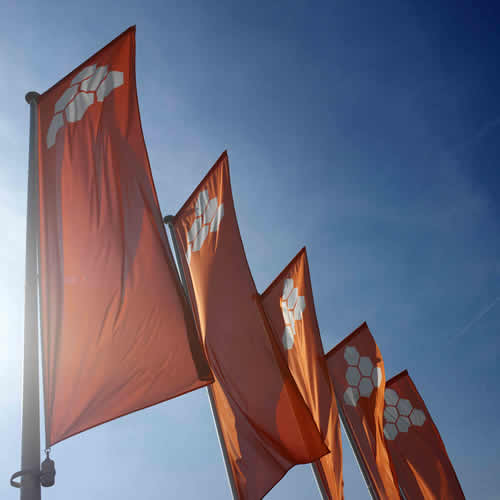
Katoen Natie company flags

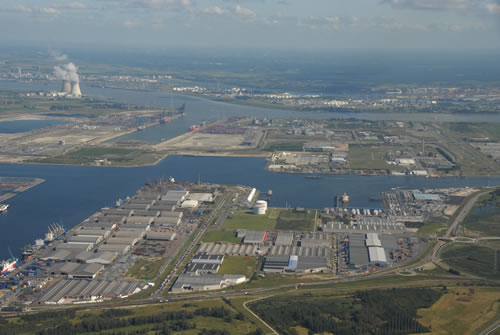
Port of Antwerp, Quay 1227

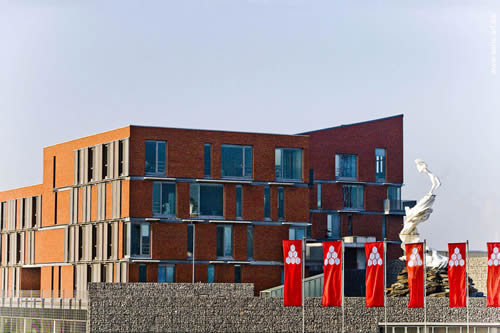
Fortress Singelberg at Quay 1548, port of Antwerp

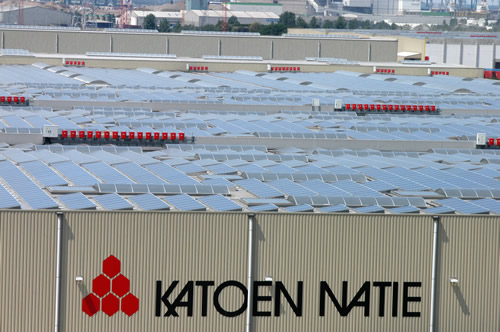
Solar panels at Loghidden City, Quay 1998

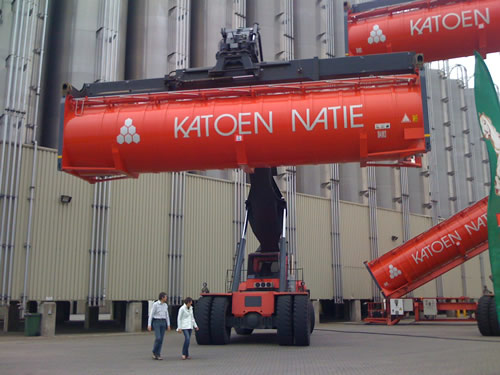
Katoen Natie container stacker

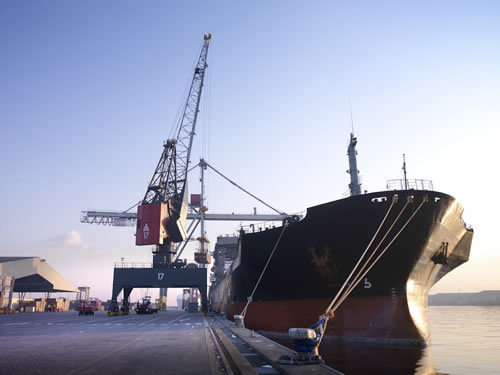
Katoen Natie Terminals at Quay 1227, port of Antwerp

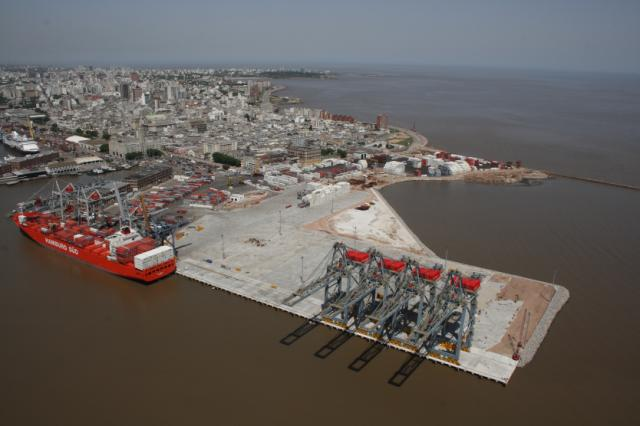
Katoen Natie in the port of Montevideo, Uruguay

Katoen Natie is an international logistics service provider and port operator based in Antwerp, Belgium. The company is present in 36 countries in five continents and employs about 13,000 people worldwide. In 2009 the company had 154 logistics platforms.

== Fields ==
The company is organized into 7 main business units, each focusing on a specific branch:

- petrochemicals
- specialty chemicals
- consumer goods
- industry
- general cargo & commodities
- port operations
- processing & projects
- art

== History ==
Incorporated in 1854 as a cooperative in the port of Antwerp (Belgium), the original activities of Katoen Natie consisted of typical wharfinger activities: the reception and handling of goods on the docks, especially cotton – hence the ‘Katoen’ in the name- and other primary resources such as jute, coffee, cocoa, wool, rubber, aluminum. The wharfinger (Natie) traditionally formed the link between the stevedoring (loading and discharging of ships) and transport activities to and from the hinterland.

In the 1980s the range of sectors was expanded to include consumer goods (e.g. textiles, electronics, DIY articles, fast-moving consumer goods) and the petrochemical, chemical and automotive industries.

The 1990s marked a strong international growth for Katoen Natie. Today, the company is present in Europe, North America, South America, the Middle East, Southeast Asia, and Africa.

== Services ==
According to the company Katoen Natie, it offers integrated logistics solutions, including warehousing and storage, packing and (re)packaging, transport and distribution, value-added services, cleaning and repair, projects & process engineering and port operations. Each business unit has its own set of services:

=== Petrochemicals ===
Katoen Natie offers a global logistic service for the petrochemicals' industry. The supply scope includes product related activities such as homogenizing, drying, sieving, deodorizing, grinding and dedusting plastics.

=== Specialty chemicals ===
The company provides a link between producers and end-users of specialty chemicals and high-tech plastics.

=== Consumer goods ===
It manages the logistics and distribution of fast-moving goods such as textiles, DIY, sporting goods, consumer electronics, preserved food, etc.

=== Industry ===
The Industry business group offers supply chain solutions to customers in the automotive world, such as vehicle manufacturers, first and second tier suppliers and suppliers to the aftermarket. This business unit also offers solutions to manufacturers and distributors of industrial products, such as machinery, tools and semifinished products.

=== General cargo & commodities ===
This business unit provides logistics and engineering services. From transport and reception of general cargo and commodities to the conditioning, repackaging and distribution towards the final customer, among other services.

=== Port operations ===
Katoen Natie offers stevedoring and terminal services for containers, general cargo, rolling stock and forest products. It also provides container depots, maintenance & repair and warehousing services in ports in Europe and South America.

=== Processing & projects ===
This business unit is active in designing and building industrial processing lines and logistics terminals. Services offered range from process technologies, product handling, dosing, mixing, storage characteristics, process controls to total project management of green-field terminal/facility build: permit requests, civil and mechanical construction, utility analyses and tie-ins to local networks.

== Green policy ==
In 2009, Katoen Natie installed 800,000 m^{2} of solar panels on the roofs of its warehouses in Kallo, Antwerp, Genk and Ghent. These installations produce a yearly amount of about 35 gigawatt hours, accounting for 25% of the total solar energy capacity of the Flemish Region. The electricity that is generated with these solar panels is mainly used for Katoen Natie's own electricity supply. The remaining energy is transferred back to the electricity net.

In 2017, Katoen Natie installed six wind turbines at the Loghidden City logistics park in Kallo. Together, the windmills generate about 52 GWh per year, which is roughly equivalent to the annual electricity consumption of 13,000 households.

The company is currently investigating the implementation of electric cars.

== Loghidden City ==
Centrally located in the port of Antwerp lies Loghidden City, a high-tech logistics complex covering some 260 hectares. It has 350 m of wharf at the entrance of the Kallo lock, where barges and feeders can be loaded and unloaded. The logistics complex counts about 150 warehouses of 8,000 m^{2} each.

== HeadquARTers: Katoen Natie’s art collection ==
The group has an art collection, housed in its headquarters. HeadquARTers was created by the architects Robbrecht and Daem. Four 19th-century warehouses, two Art Nouveau houses and one new building have been integrated into the company's headquARTers.

HeadquARTers houses the world's largest collection of textiles and “objets d’art” of the Coptic art (late Egyptian period). Some of the fabrics date from as far back as 2000 BC.

In addition, the Katoen Natie headquarters houses an extensive Cobra collection with works by the Belgian artists Pierre Alechinsky and Christian Dotremont, the Dutchmen Karel Appel, Corneille, Rooskens and Lucebert and the Danish artists Asger Jorn, Carl-Henning Pedersen and Egill Jacobsen. Contemporary artists from Latin America are represented as well. Installations by the hand of Wim Delvoye, Jan Fabre, Panamarenko, Denmark, Kobe and Marcel Broodthaers complete the collection.
