= Phil Mertens =

Belgian art historian (1928–1989)

Philomène (Phil) Mertens (1928–1989) was a Belgian art historian, an authority on abstract and constructivist art, who became director of the Museum of Modern Art within the Royal Museums of Fine Arts of Belgium.

== Publications ==
- Le nord au sud, 25 ans d'art en Belgique (1947-1972) (1972)
- La Jeune peinture belge, 1945-1948 (Brussels, 1975)
- The Museum of Modern Art, Brussels: Royal Museums of Fine Arts, Belgium (Brussels, 1988)
