= List of protected heritage sites in Modave =

This table shows an overview of the protected heritage sites in the Walloon town Modave. This list is part of Belgium's national heritage.

Object	Year/architect	Town/section	Address	Coordinates	Number^{?}	Image
Castle of the Counts of Marchin and its attendant buildings: buildings bordering the courtyard: entrance porch, castle, stables, outbuildings and the park ^{(nl)} ^{(fr)}		Modave	rue du Parc n°4	50.440823°N 5.286810°E	61041-CLT-0001-01 Info	Kasteel van de graven van Marchin en diens bijgebouwen: gebouwen grenzend aan de binnenplaats: entreeportaal, kasteel, stallen, bijgebouwen en het ensemble gevormd door het genoemde kasteel, de bijgebouwen en het park
"Jardin Madame" garden of the counts of Marchin ^{(nl)} ^{(fr)}		Modave		50.440469°N 5.286984°E	61041-CLT-0002-01 Info	
Church of Saint-Martin ^{(nl)} ^{(fr)}		Modave		50.442732°N 5.301411°E	61041-CLT-0005-01 Info	
Extension of the Castle towards two bordering farms ^{(nl)} ^{(fr)}		Modave		50.441459°N 5.287114°E	61041-CLT-0006-01 Info	
Church of Saint-Nicolas ^{(nl)} ^{(fr)}		Modave		50.488530°N 5.324117°E	61041-CLT-0007-01 Info	Kerk Saint-Nicolas
Church of Saint-Nicolas with graveyard, chapel, and fountain Sainte-Geneviève ^{(nl)} ^{(fr)}		Modave		50.488547°N 5.323709°E	61041-CLT-0008-01 Info	Ensemble van de kerk Saint-Nicolas, het kerkhof er omheen, de fontein Sainte-Geneviève en de kapel
Chapel of Saint-Pierre ^{(nl)} ^{(fr)}		Modave		50.462131°N 5.294340°E	61041-CLT-0009-01 Info	Kapel Saint-Pierre
Oppidum and surroundings ^{(nl)} ^{(fr)}		Modave		50.452846°N 5.281550°E	61041-CLT-0010-01 Info	
Statue of Saint-Jean Népomucène ^{(nl)} ^{(fr)}		Modave		50.489600°N 5.319957°E	61041-CLT-0011-01 Info	
Hoyoux stream ^{(nl)} ^{(fr)}		Modave		50.427177°N 5.314337°E	61041-CLT-0012-01 Info	Meander van Hoyoux
Mill Survillers: facades, roofs, and machinery ^{(nl)} ^{(fr)}		Modave	rue du Val n°1	50.424780°N 5.300625°E	61041-CLT-0013-01 Info	
Ice cellar of Castle Vierset ^{(nl)} ^{(fr)}		Modave	rue du Château n°2	50.481458°N 5.298139°E	61041-CLT-0016-01 Info	
Vierset Castle, excepting the veranda ^{(nl)} ^{(fr)}		Modave	rue de la Coulée n°1, Vierset-Barse	50.481248°N 5.299355°E	61041-CLT-0017-01 Info	Kasteel, uitgezonderd de veranda
Castle of the counts of Marchin and outer buildings ^{(nl)} ^{(fr)}		Modave		50.440823°N 5.286810°E	61041-PEX-0001-01 Info	Kasteel van de graven van Marchin en zijn bijgebouwen: entreeportaal, kasteel, stallen, bijgebouwen en het ensemble gevormd door het genoemde kasteel, de bijgebouwen en het park

== See also ==
- List of protected heritage sites in Liège (province)
