= Château de Modave =

Château near Modave, Belgium

Coordinates: 50.441°N 5.287°E

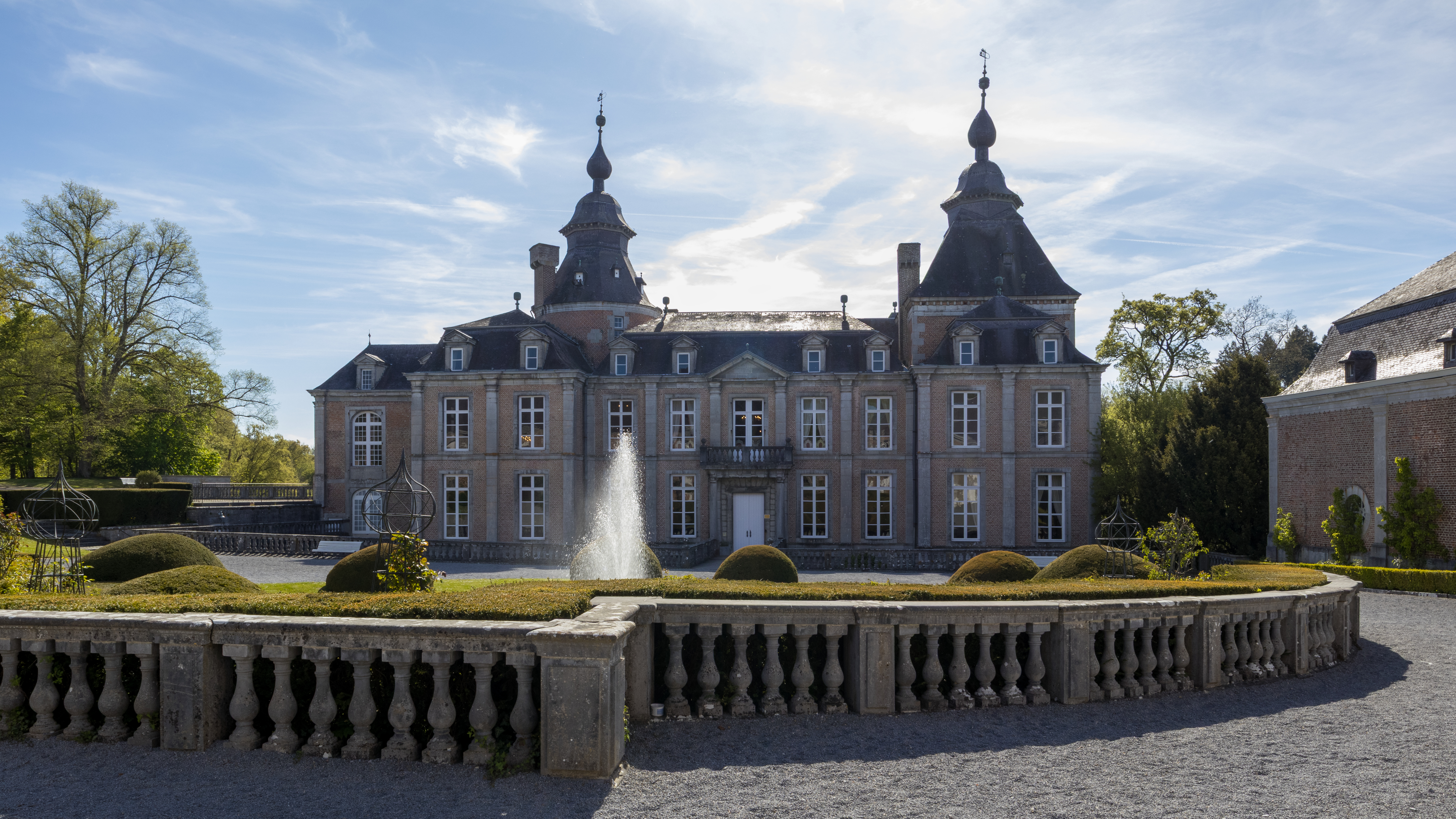
Front facade

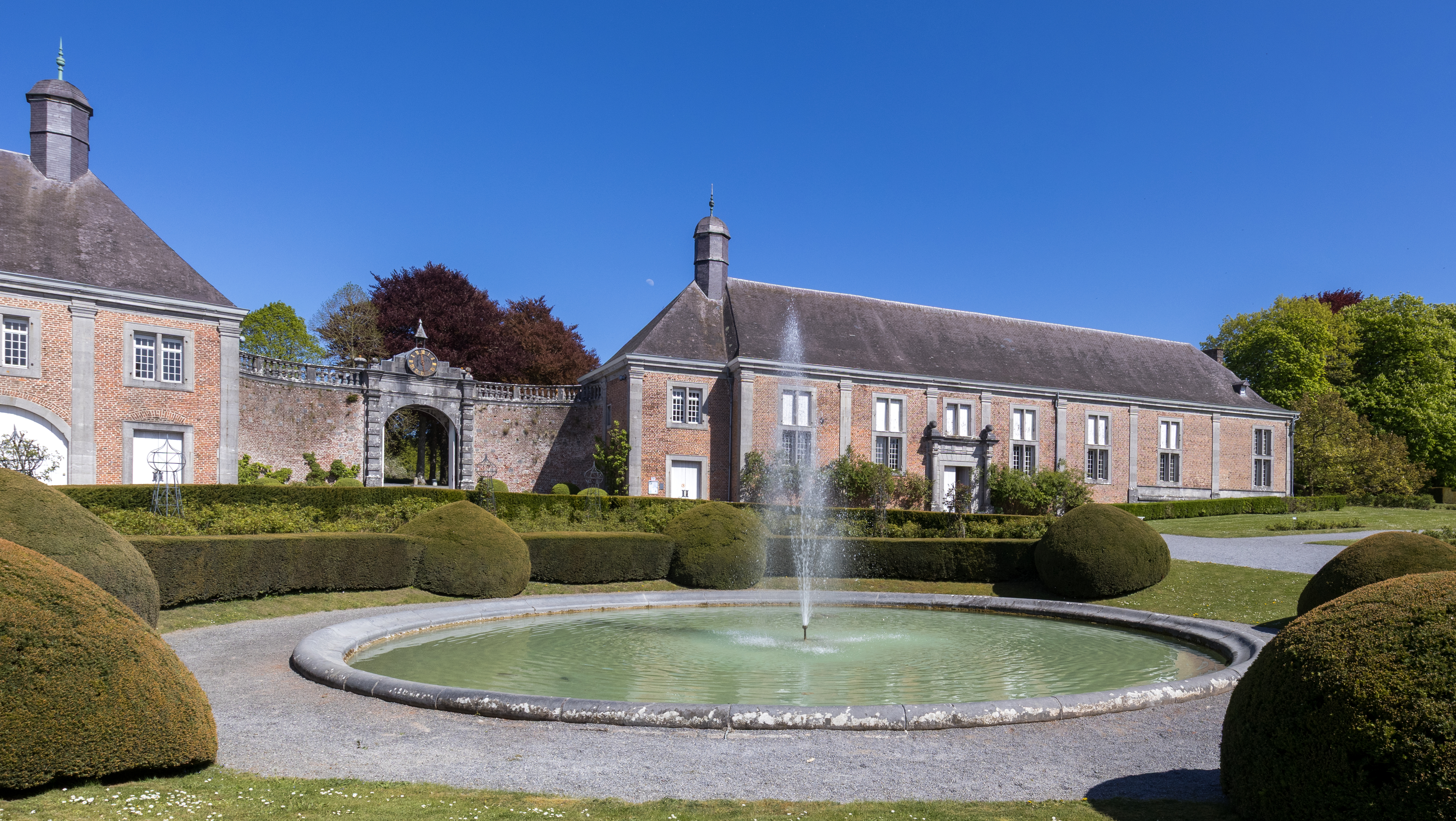
Courtyard and entrance

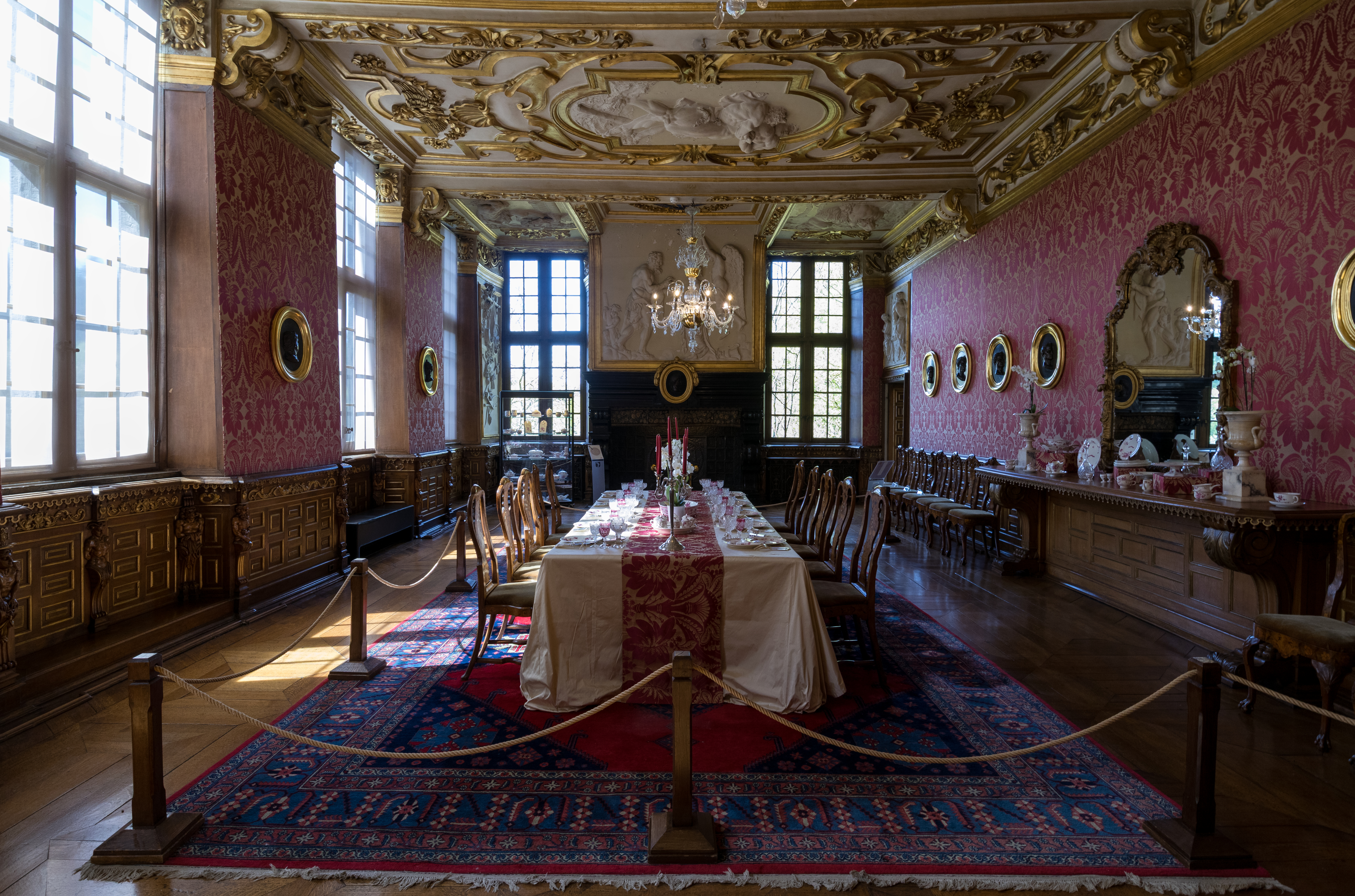
The Salon d'Hercule, fitted as a dining hall

The Château of Modave (French: Château de Modave, pronounced [ʃato də mɔdav]), also known as the Château des Comtes de Marchin (French pronunciation: [ʃato de kɔ̃t də maʁʃɛ̃], Château of the Counts of Marchin) is a château near the village of Modave in Liège Province, Wallonia, Belgium.

== History ==
The oldest part of the building, the donjon, was built on a strategic rock high above the valley of the river Hoyoux. The oldest parts still visible today date probably from the 13th century and were erected by the lords of Modave. In the 16th century the castle and the estate of Modave became the property of the Haultepenne and de Saint-Fontaine families.

In the next century Jean-Gaspard-Ferdinand de Marchin (1601–1673), a great military commander, acquired the castle and turned it from a medieval fortress into a luxury Baroque residence. His son Ferdinand de Marsin neglected the property and lived in France.

Later owners were successively:

- Maximilian Henry of Bavaria, Elector of Cologne and Prince-Bishop of Liège (1682–1684);
- Cardinal Wilhelm Egon von Fürstenberg, and his heirs (1684–1706);
- Baron Arnold de Ville (1706–1772); and
- Anne-Léon, Duke of Montmorency, and his heirs (1772–1817).

In the 19th century it was owned by the non-noble families of Lamarche, Braconier and Van Hoegaerden. Finally, the Compagnie Intercommunale Bruxelloise des Eaux ("Brussels Intercommunal Water Company") bought the property in March 1941, in order to protect the important water catchments in the park. The company still owns the château today and has been restoring it with great care. It is open for visitors from April until October and it is also used as a prestigious venue for concerts and receptions.

== Architecture ==
The ancient fortified castle was rebuilt from 1659 to 1667 in a manner showing a remarkable affinity to the most modern ideas of European country house building of the time. It is particularly close to the buildings of François Mansart. The dignified symmetry with a triangular pediment accenting the main frontage, the geometrical articulation of the wall, the mansard roofs, and the spatial contrast between the corps de logis and the side wings have much in common with Mansart's country houses, such as the Château de Maisons-Laffitte. Modave is the most prominent preserved example of High Baroque country-house architecture in the Southern Netherlands and the Prince-Bishopric of Liège.

The château is unique for its splendidly preserved historic interiors and furniture dating from the 17th and 18th centuries. The stucco ceilings date from the second half of the 17th century and were created by Jan-Christian Hansche.

== See also ==
- List of castles in Belgium
- List of protected heritage sites in Modave
