= Royseux Castle =

Castle in Liège Province, Belgium

- Château de Royseux (French)
- Modave, Liège Province, Wallonia, Belgium

Site information
- Type: Castle

Location
- Coordinates: 50°28′56.29″N 5°17′54.56″E

Royseux Castle (French: Château de Royseux) is a castle in the ancienne commune of Vierset-Barse, in the municipality of Modave, Liège Province, Wallonia, Belgium.

== See also ==
- List of castles in Belgium
