= John Gaspar Ferdinand de Marchin, Comte de Granville =

General John Gaspar Ferdinand de Marchin Comte de Marchin
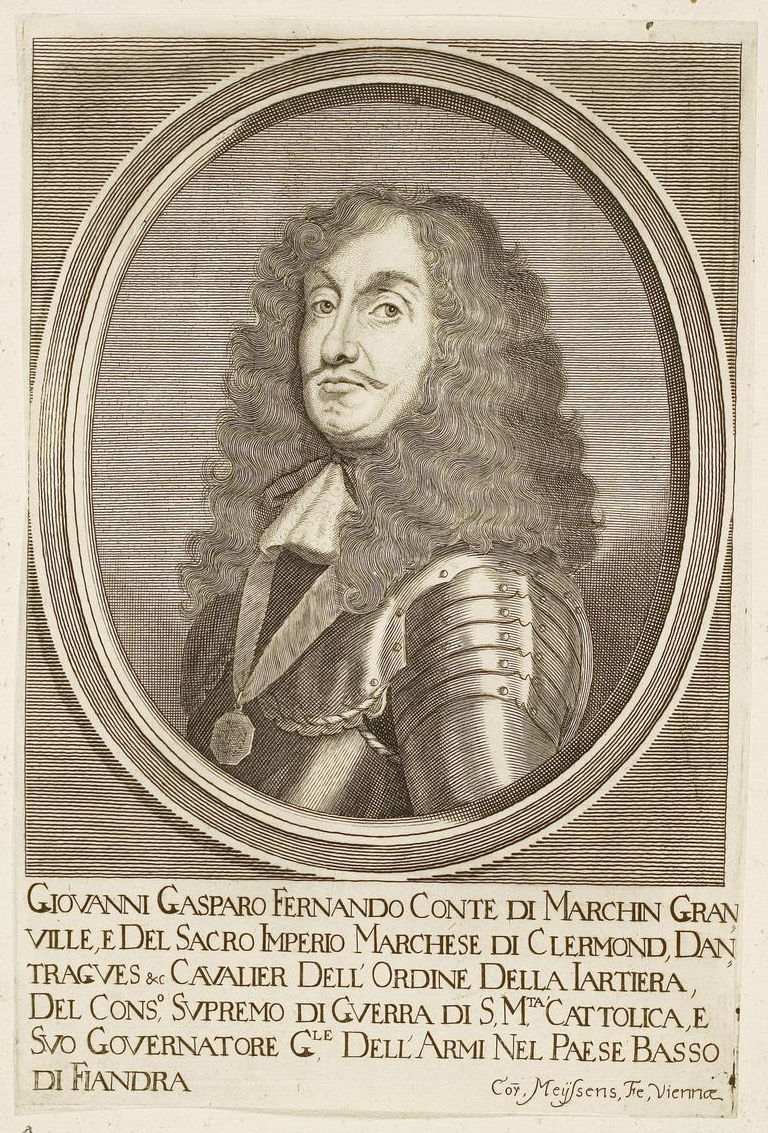
- John Gaspar Ferdinand de Marchin
- Born: 1601; Huy, Spanish Netherlands, Spanish Empire
- Died: 21 August 1673 (aged 71–72); Spa, Spanish Netherlands, Spanish Empire
- Spouse: Marie de Balzac d 'Entraigues
- Children: Ferdinand de Marsin; Louise-Agnès-Henriette de Marchin
- Relatives: Jean de Marchin (father); Jeanne de Vaux-Renard (mother)
- Military career
- Allegiance: Kingdom of France (1622–1653); Spanish Empire (1653–1672)
- Branch: (Kingdom of France) French Royal Army (1622–1653) (Spanish Empire) Spanish Army (1653–1672)
- Service years: 1622–1672
- Rank: General
- Conflicts: Thirty Years' War: Capture of Saint-Amour, Chevreau, Courland, Crèvecoeur, Chilly, L'Etoile, Chavigny, Château-Chalon, Lons-le-Saunier, and Blétheran; Battle of Freiburg; Battle of Nördlingen (1645); Franco-Spanish War (1635–1659): Fronde; Siege of Turin (1640); Siege of Ivrea; Relief of Chivasso; Capture of Coni; Siege of Alessandria; Siege of Philippsburg; Siege of Lleida; Battle of Arras (1654); Battle of Valenciennes (1656); Portuguese Restoration War: Siege of Évora; War of Devolution: Relief of Lille; Siege of Charleroi

Viceroy of Catalonia
- In office 6 April – 22 September 1651
- Monarch: Louis XIV
- Regent (Note: During the minority age of Louis XIV): Anne of Austria
- First Minister of State: Cardinal Mazarin
- Secretary of State for War: Michel Le Tellier
- Preceded by: Louis, Duke of Vendôme
- Succeeded by: Philippe de La Mothe-Houdancourt

John Gaspar Ferdinand de Marchin, or Marsin, Comte de Granville (1601–1673) was a Walloon military commander from the Spanish Netherlands.

== Life ==
At the age of 13 Marchin was enlisted in the regiment of the Count of Tilly and fought many battles in the Thirty Years War. He later served under Louis II de Bourbon, Prince de Condé.

By 1647, he was lieutenant general and in command of the Army in Catalonia. During the Fronde he sided with Condé against King Louis XIV. He was imprisoned in Perpignan for 13 months. When the peace was signed on 30 July 1653, Marchin, like Condé, refused the amnesty and went to Spain where Philip IV appointed him company commander in his army.

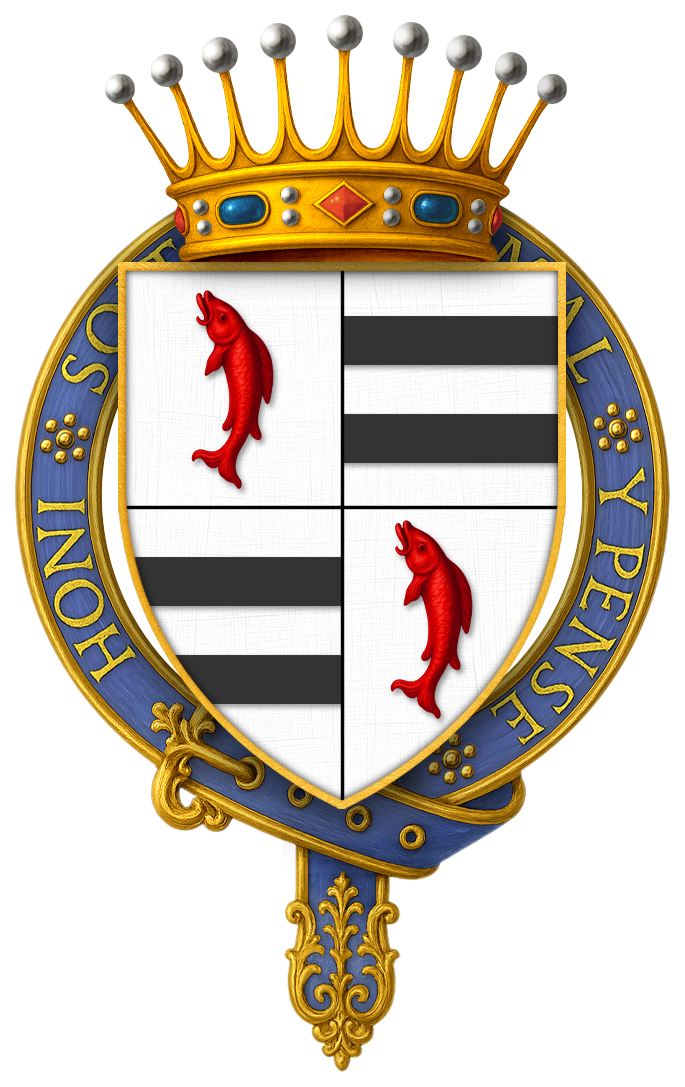
Garter-encircled arms of John Gaspar Ferdinand de Marchin, Comte de Granville, KG

In 1658 Charles II of England made him a Knight of the Garter.

He participated in the disastrous campaign in the Portuguese Restoration War under John Joseph of Austria (1663–1664). He also led the Spanish troops against the French in the north of France, where he was defeated in 1667 by François de Créquy.

Marchin then retired to his estate at Modave Castle, where he spent his entire fortune on its restoration, which took 15 years.

== Family ==
Marchin married Marie de Balzac d'Entragues, daughter of the Marquis de Clermont, counsellor to the King of France.

They had two children :

- Ferdinand de Marsin (1651–1706), Marshal of France, killed in the Battle of Turin.
- Agnes de Marsin, died young.

== Sources ==
- Modave Castle official website
- Eupedia: Modave Castle
