= Vierset-Barse =

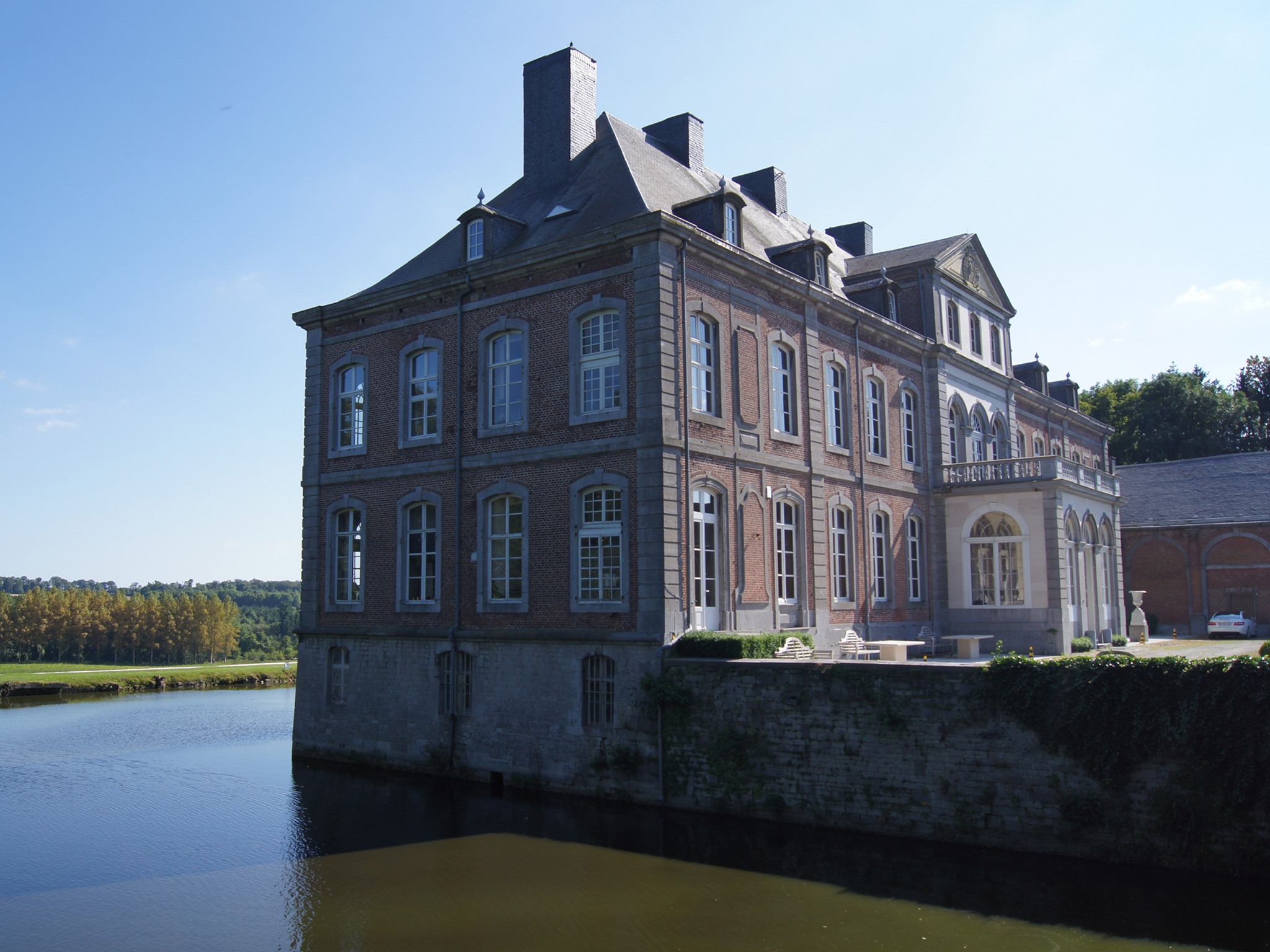
- Vierset Castle in Vierset-Barse

- Location within Belgium Location within Europe
- Coordinates: 50°28′57″N 05°17′51″E
- Country: Belgium
- Region: Wallonia
- Province: Liège
- Municipality: Modave

Vierset-Barse is a district of the municipality of Modave, located in the province of Liège in Wallonia, Belgium.

The area has been inhabited since prehistoric times. During the Middle Ages, there was a court of justice in the village of Vierset. Vierset, the main village of the district, contains a communal building from the late 19th century, a village church from 1857 and Vierset Castle, built on the ruins of a medieval castle in the 18th century.

The hamlet Limet is also part of Vierset-Barse.
