= Vierset Castle =

Castle in Wallonia, Belgium

- Modave, Wallonia, Belgium
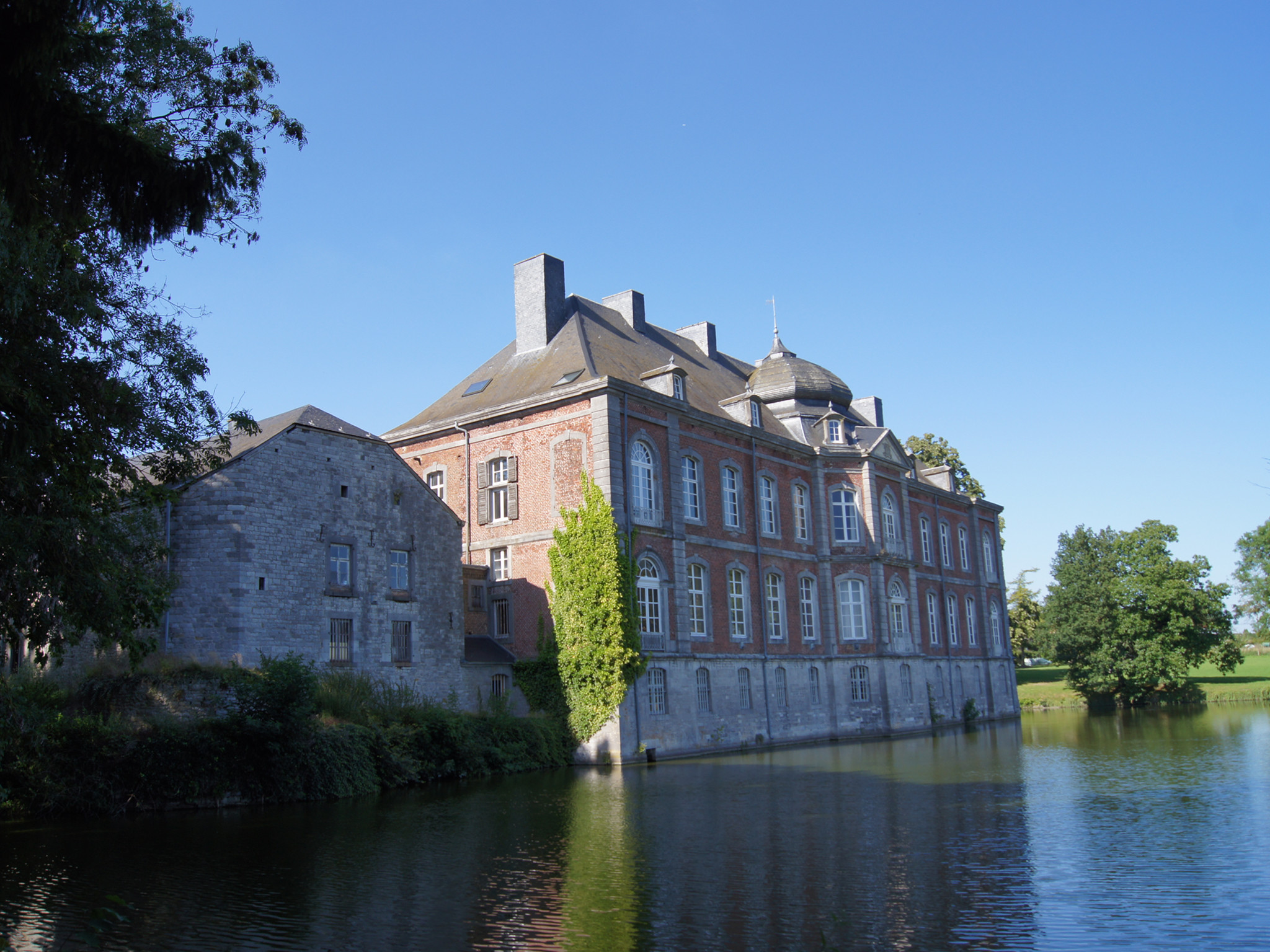

Site information
- Type: Castle
- Owner: lamalle family
- Open to the public: no
- Condition: good

Location
- Coordinates: 50.481°N 5.299°E

Site history
- Built: ~1090
- Built by: unknown

Garrison information
- Past commanders: General de Billehe
- Occupants: Prince Bishop Henri Van Gelder

Vierset Castle is a castle in Vierset-Barse, municipality of Modave, Wallonia, Belgium. It is also surrounded on three sides by a moat.

== See also ==
- List of castles in Belgium
