= Limet, Belgium =

Limet
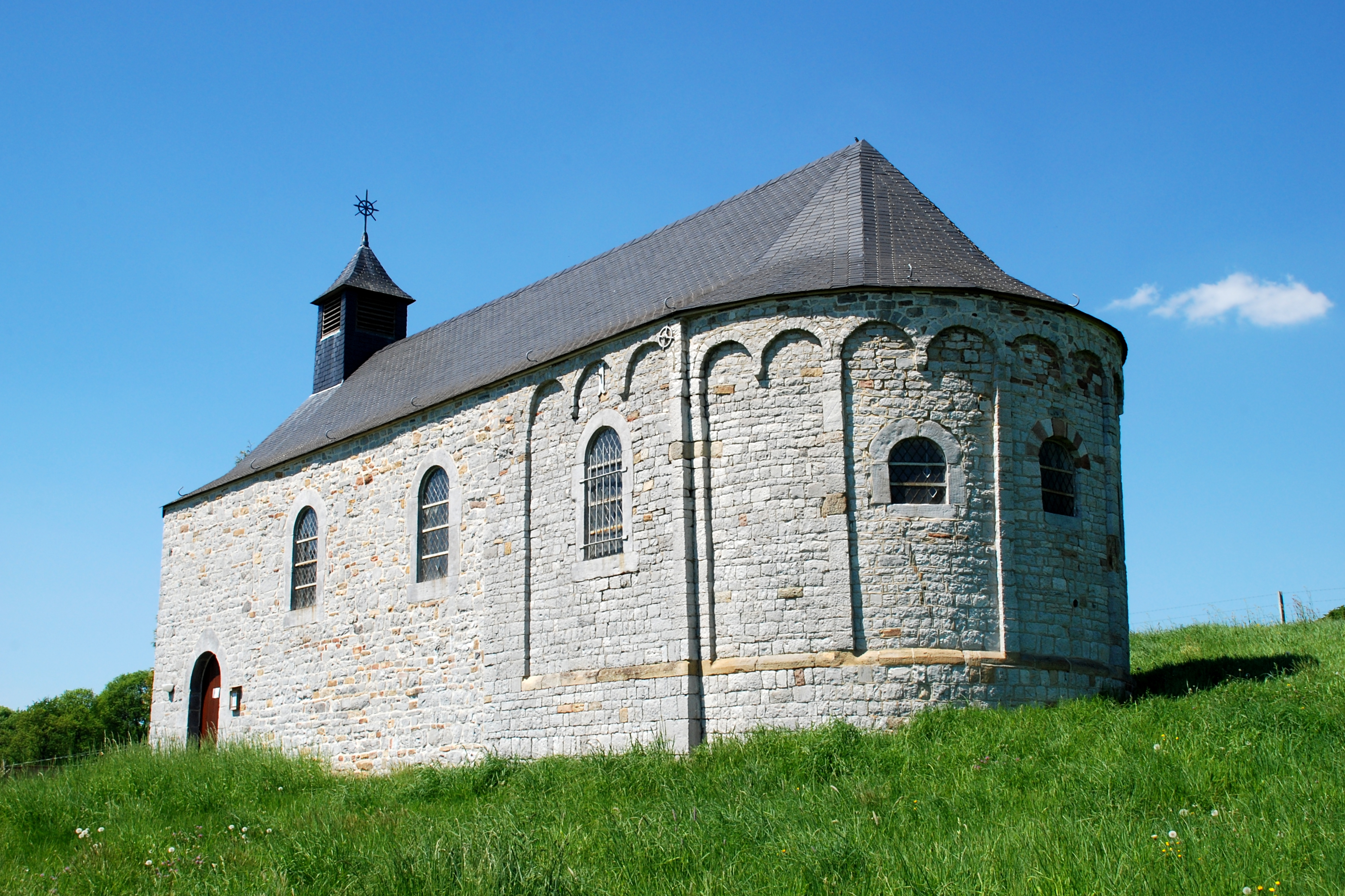
- Chapel of Saint Peter, Limet

- Location within Belgium Location within Europe
- Coordinates: 50°27′42″N 05°17′45″E
- Country: Belgium
- Region: Wallonia
- Province: Liège
- Municipality: Modave

Limet is a hamlet in the district of Vierset-Barse, in the municipality of Modave in Wallonia, Belgium.

The hamlet contains a well-preserved Romanesque chapel, the oldest parts of which date from the 11th century. It is built in a simple Mosan style and has been little altered throughout the centuries. It was renovated and examined archaeologically in 1996.
