= Jan-Christian Hansche =

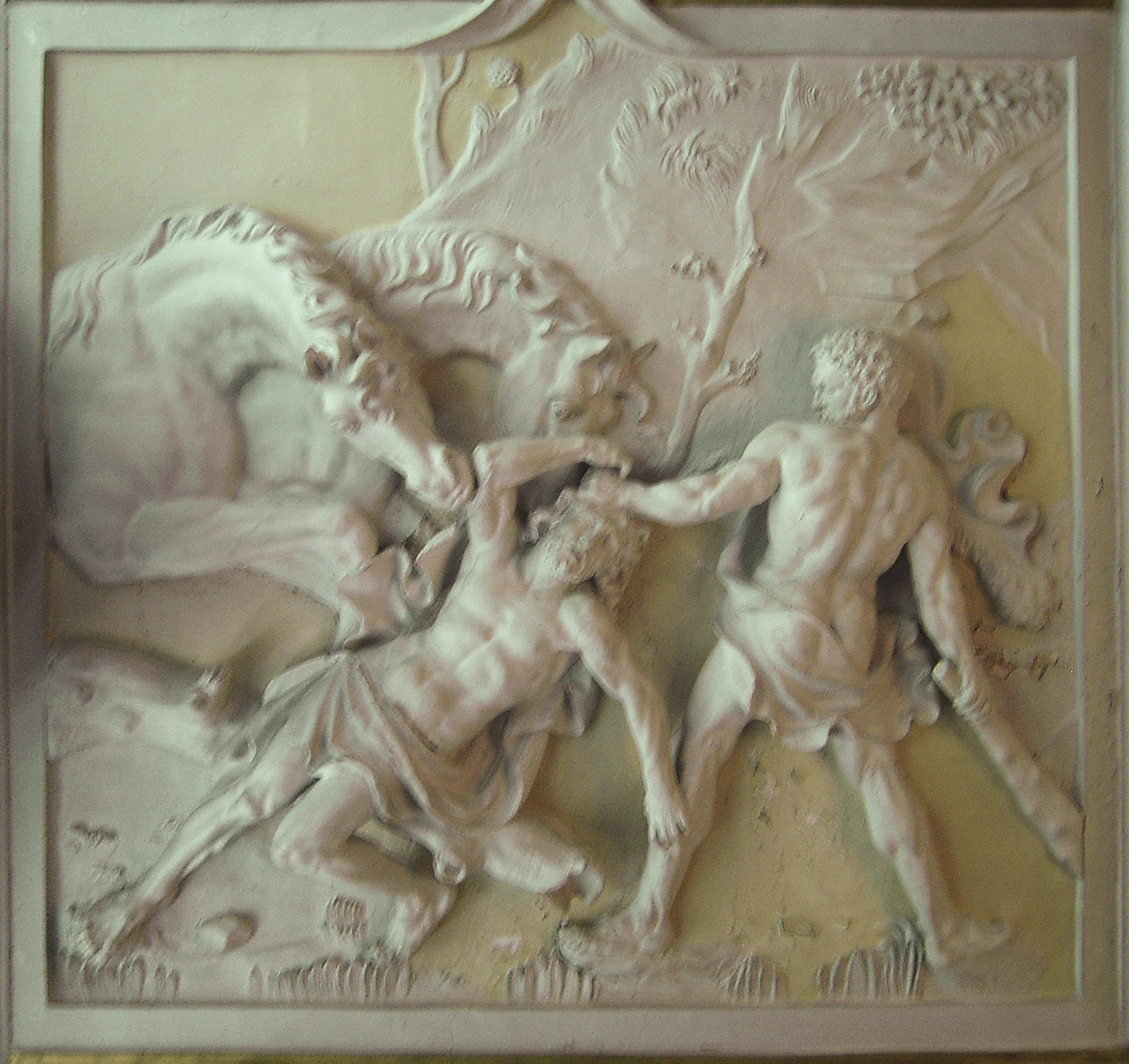
Château de Modave: scene from the life of Hercules (the Mares of Diomedes) on the ceiling of the Salon des Gobelins by Hansche

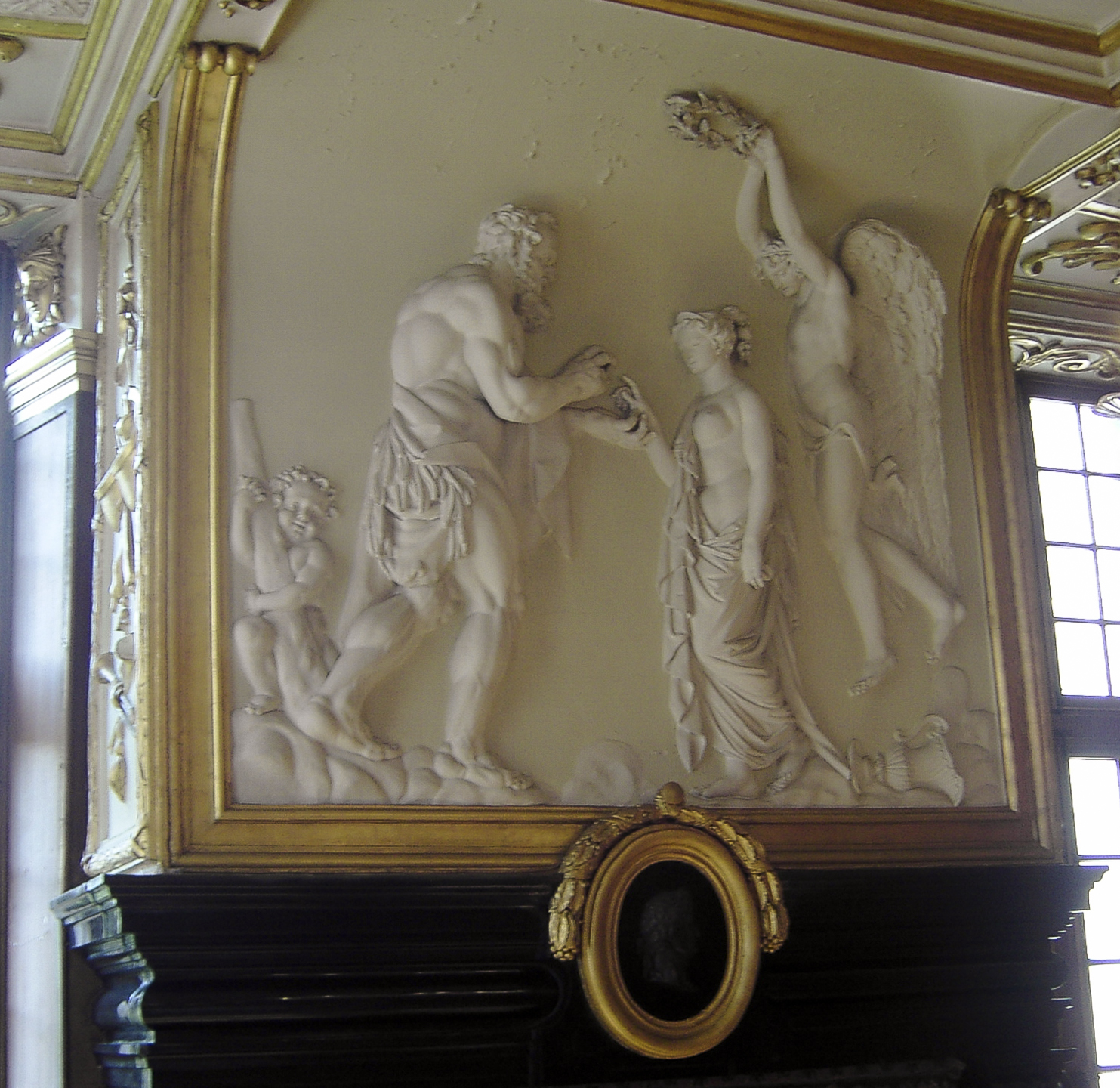
Château de Modave: marriage of Hercules on the chimneybreast of the Salon d'Hercule by Hansche

Jan-Christian Hansche or Hanssche was a Flemish artist, possibly of German origin, who worked as a stuccoist in the Southern Netherlands, and also in Germany and Holland, in the second half of the 17th century.

In 1672 he made the stucco decoration of the library of Park Abbey near Leuven in Belgium. The stucco relief represents the church fathers and the evangelists as well as scenes from the life of Saint Norbert. In the refectory of the same abbey he decorated the ceiling with seven biblical scenes (1679), signing his work "jan christiaen hansche".

He also worked in several houses and monasteries in Ghent, in Beaulieu Castle (Belgium) in Machelen and in Château de Modave.

A magnificent example of his work are the decorations for Modave Castle. The grand vestibule of this castle is decorated with a genealogical tree of the house of the Counts of Marchin, including the coats of arms of the members of the family but also reliefs depicting some ancestors as knights in full armour on their horses. A series of rooms on the ground floor is decorated with scenes from the life of Hercules, while the apartment on the first floor follows the theme of the four seasons.

== Sources ==
- Anon. Hansche (Hanssche), Jan Christiaen in: Thieme-Becker.Allgemeines Lexikon der bildenden Künstler von der Antike bis zur Gegenwart, vol. XV, Leipzig, 1922: 599.
- Vrancken, Michel, 1971: De stucplafonds van Jan Christiaan Hansche (1655–1685) (master's thesis), Katholieke Universiteit Leuven
- Van Vaeck, M., 1997: Beelden van omhoog, Hansches 17de-eeuwse plafonddecoraties in stucwerk in de kastelen van Horst, Modave en Beaulieu en in het Gentse Brouwershuis in: Monumenten en Landschappen, XVI, 1997, 5: 21–53.
