= Strée =

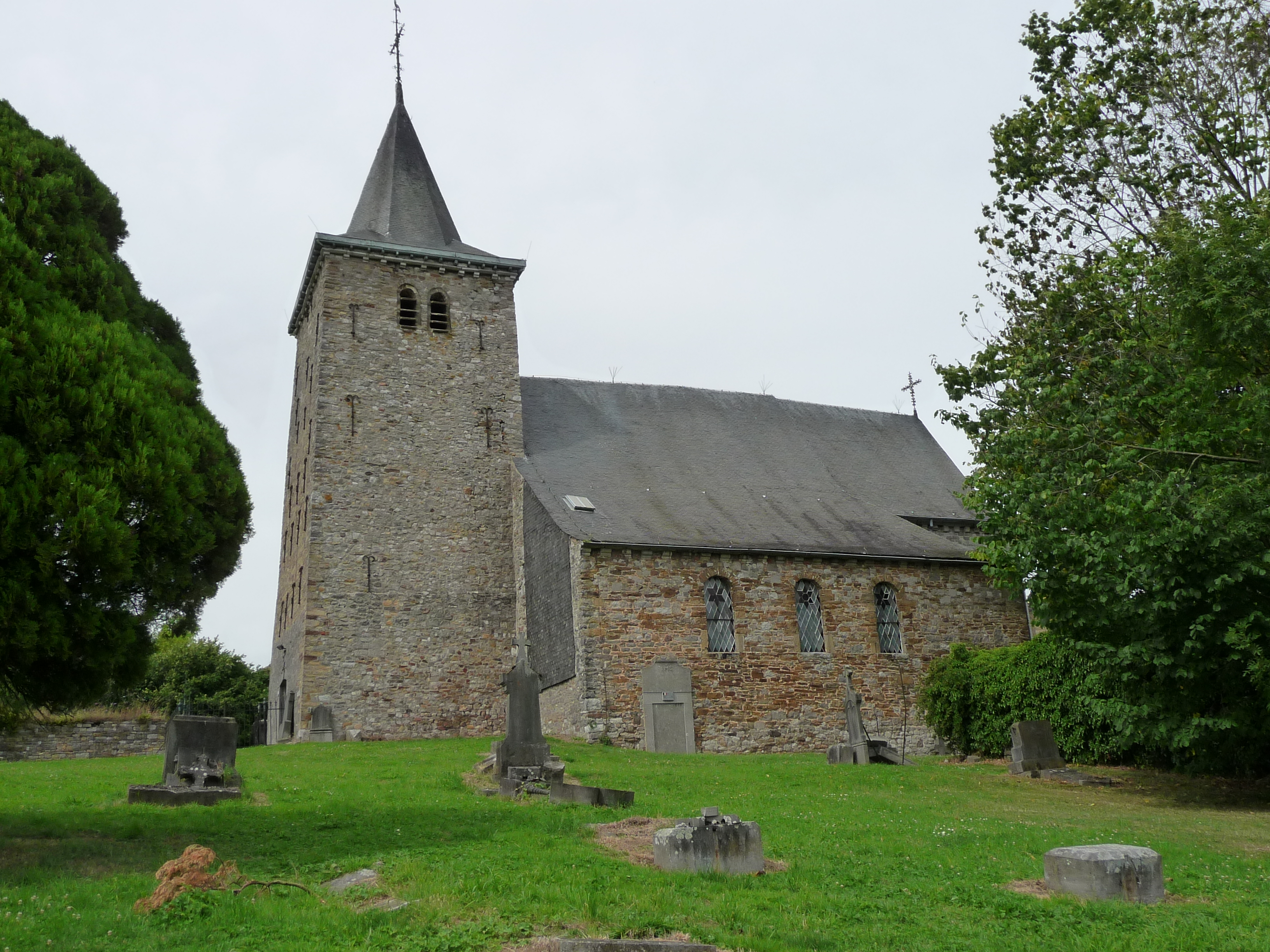
- Church of Saint Nicholas, Strée

- Location within Belgium Location within Europe
- Coordinates: 50°29′22″N 05°19′27″E
- Country: Belgium
- Region: Wallonia
- Province: Liège
- Municipality: Modave

Strée (French pronunciation: [stʁe]) is a village and district of the municipality of Modave, located in the province of Liège in Wallonia, Belgium.

During the Middle Ages, the village was in possession of the Knights Templar. From the 15th century, a local court of justice existed in the village. The village church, the Church of Saint Nicholas, Strée, is a Romanesque edifice dating from the 11th century. It contains a baptismal font from the same century, and a Roman funerary monument from the 3rd century, reused as a base for a crucifix. The church is surrounded by a historical cemetery and lies close to a source which was considered to have healing properties. In the village, there is also a château from c. 1600, rebuilt during the 18th and 19th centuries.
