= Ferdinand de Marsin =

French marshal and diplomat (1656–1706)

- 1st Count of Marsin
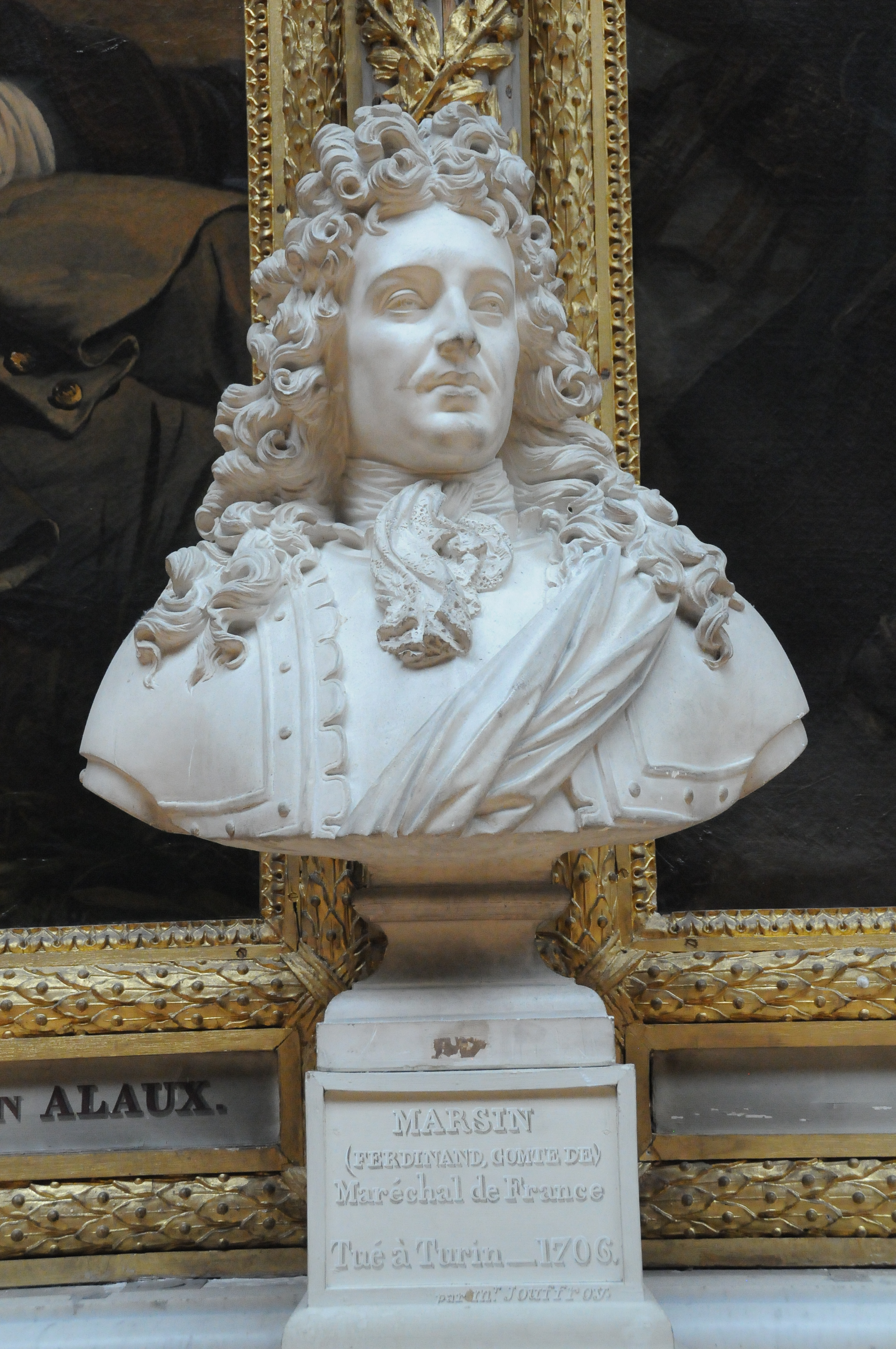
- Bust of Ferdinand, comte de Marsin in the Galerie des Batailles, Palace of Versailles
- Born: 10 February 1656; Liège, Bishopric of Liège
- Died: 9 September 1706 (aged 50); Turin, Savoyard state
- Father: John Gaspar Ferdinand de Marchin, Comte de Granville
- Mother: Marie de Balzac d'Entragues
- Military career
- Allegiance: Kingdom of France
- Rank: Marshal of France
- Wars: Nine Years' War; Battle of Fleurus; Battle of Landen; Siege of Charleroi; War of the Spanish Succession; Battle of Luzzara; Battle of Speyerbach; Battle of Blenheim; Siege of Turin
- Awards: Order of the Holy Spirit; Order of Saint Michael; Order of Saint Louis

Ferdinand, comte de Marsin (or Marchin) (February 10, 1656 – September 9, 1706) was a French general and diplomat, who was Marshal of France.

== Biography ==
He was born in Liège as the son of John Gaspar Ferdinand de Marchin, Comte de Granville and Marie de Balzac d'Entragues.

Marsin served in Flanders, and was wounded at the Battle of Fleurus (1690). He took part in the Battle of Neerwinden and the siege of Charleroi.
In 1701–1702 he was French ambassador in Spain.

In the War of the Spanish Succession, he was present at the Battle of Luzzara. He became marshal in 1703, after the battle of Speyerbach.

In 1704 he was defeated at the Battle of Blenheim, together with Tallard, and was mortally wounded at the Siege of Turin. Imprisoned in the same city, he died a few days later.
