= Huy =

City in Liège Province, Wallonia, Belgium

Huy: Hu (Walloon); Hoei (Dutch)
- Municipality
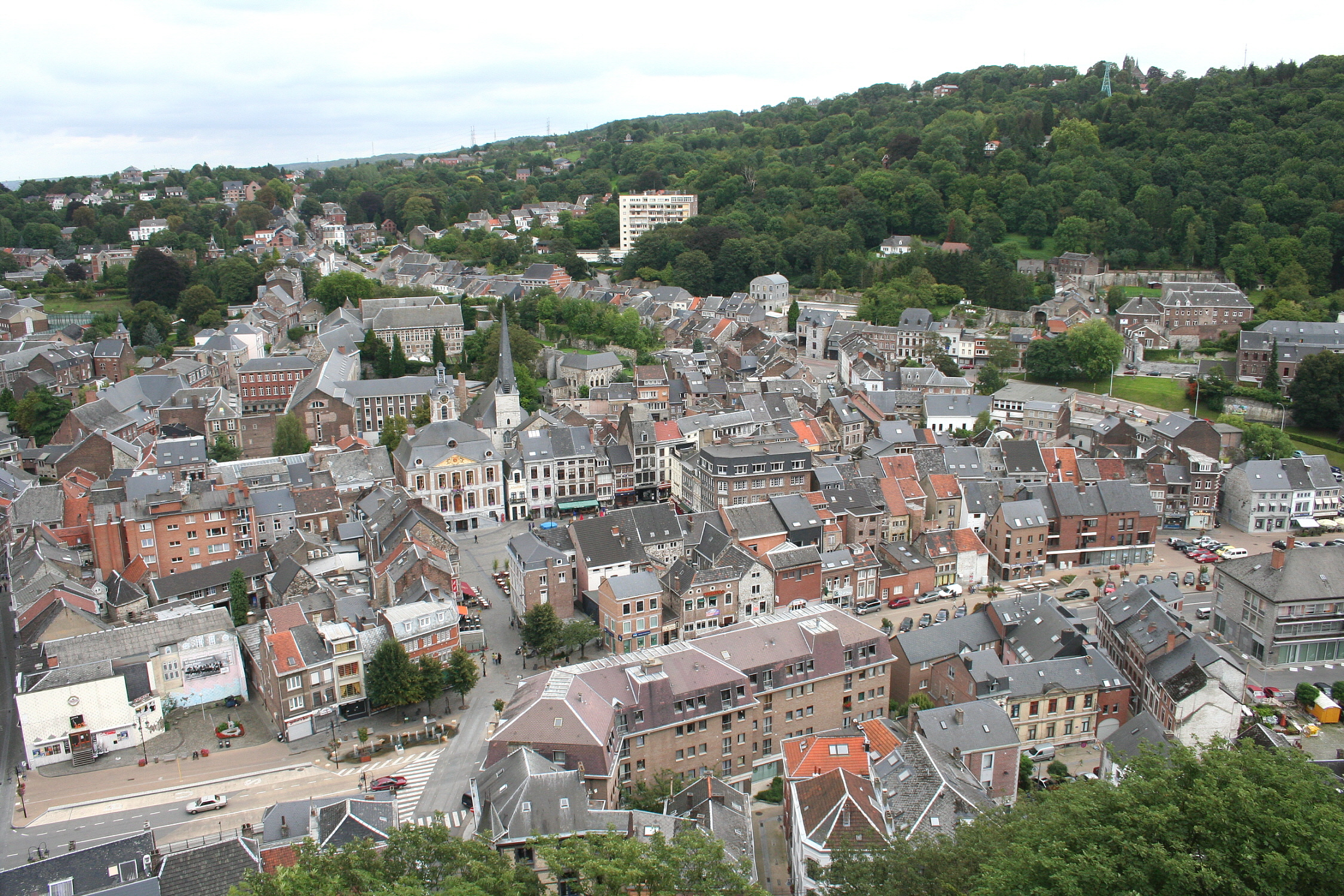

- Flag Coat of arms

- Location of Huy in Liège province
- Interactive map of Huy
- Location in Belgium
- Coordinates: 50°31′N 05°14′E
- Country: Belgium
- Community: French Community
- Region: Wallonia
- Province: Liège
- Arrondissement: Huy

Government
  - Mayor: Eric Dosogne (PS)
  - Governing parties: PS, MR, Idhuy

Area
  - Total: 47.64 km^{2} (18.39 sq mi)

Population (2018-01-01)
  - Total: 21,293
  - Density: 447.0/km^{2} (1,158/sq mi)
- Postal codes: 4500
- NIS code: 61031
- Area codes: 085
- Website: www.huy.be

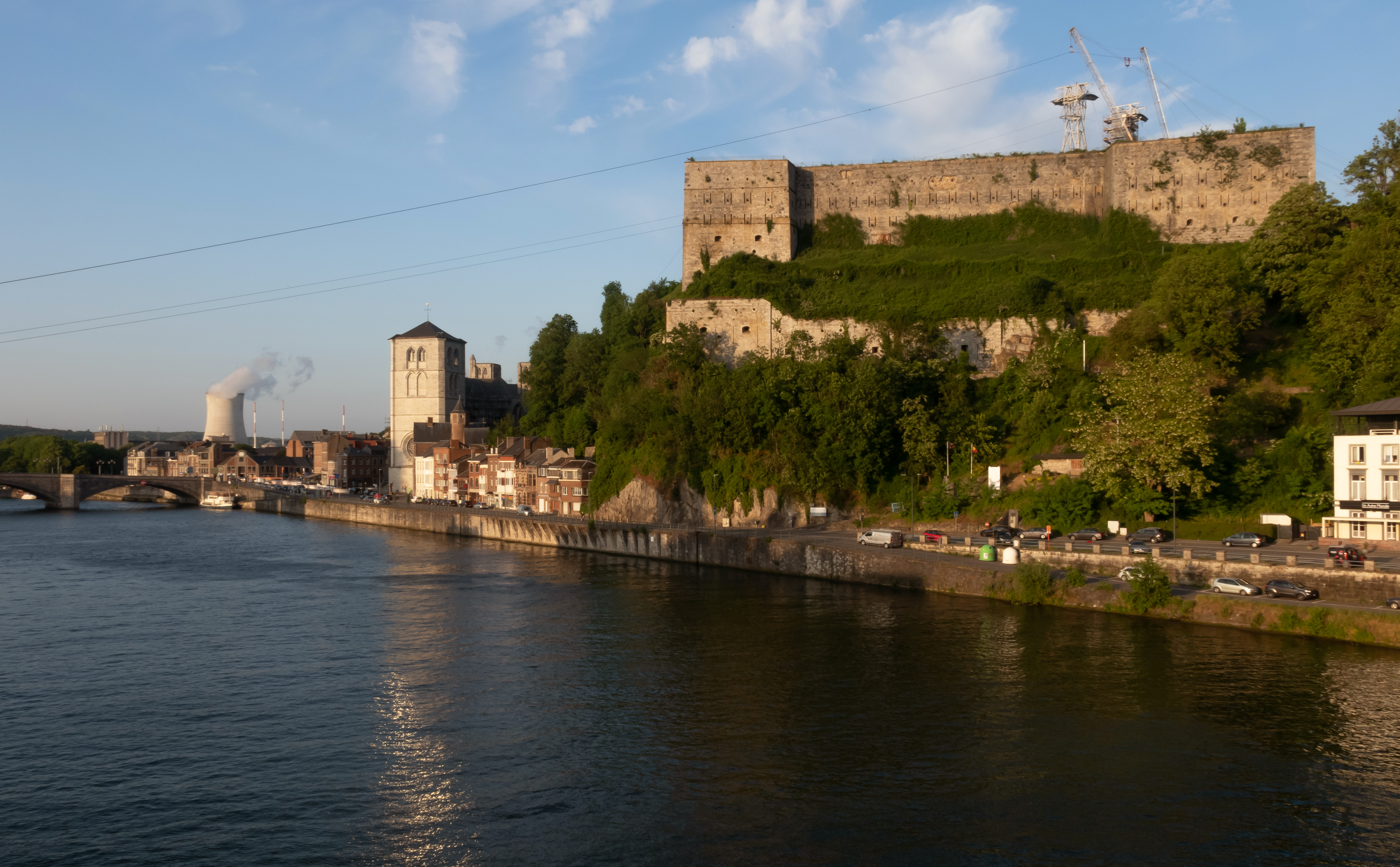
Huy, view from the bridge (le Pont du Chemin de Fer) with the fortress (Fort de Huy), two churches (la collégiale Notre-Dame) and (Saint-Domitien) and the Tihange nuclear power plant

Huy (French: [ɥi] or [wi]; Dutch: Hoei [ɦui]; Walloon: Hu) is a city and municipality of Wallonia located in the province of Liège, Belgium. Huy lies along the river Meuse, at the mouth of the small river Hoyoux. It is in the sillon industriel, the former industrial backbone of Wallonia, home to the Walloon population.

The municipality consists of the following districts: Ben-Ahin, Huy, Neuville-sous-Huy, and Tihange.

== History ==
The first village originated around the Roman castrum, an early fortress located on the right bank of the river Meuse. The village was evangelized by Saint Domitian, bishop of Tongeren in the 6th century and the town is mentioned for the first time in a 7th-century testament (as Hoius vicus, taking its name from the river Hoyoux).

In the early Middle Ages, Huy was one of the most prosperous cities on the Meuse, with a flourishing economy based mostly on metallurgy, but also on tanning, sculpting, woodworking, and wine-making. In the 10th century, Huy was promoted to county status, but soon became part of the Prince-Bishopric of Liège, with which it would share its history for more than eight centuries. Huy was the recipient of the first historically known charter north of the Alps, confirming it as a city in 1066. It is around that time that Peter the Hermit harangued the locals and persuaded them to participate in the First Crusade, having already participated himself in the People's Crusade and the Rhineland massacres in 1096.

In the 13th and 14th centuries, the economy boomed thanks to the cloth industry. The castle on a hill right in the middle of town, was used in times of war and strengthened accordingly. By the 15th century, it had become the symbol of the city. The following two centuries, however, witnessed a gradual decline in the city's fortunes, due in large part to the strategic value of its location on the Meuse. In the latter part of the 17th century, Louis XIV's wars caused the city to be repeatedly attacked and put to the sword, to the point that the frustrated inhabitants dismantled their own castle, source of their miseries, in 1715.

A new fortress was built by the Dutch in 1818 at the same strategic location above the town, called Fort de Huy. The 19th century was a period of relative prosperity based on the paper and other industries. The decline of heavy industry in the 20th century was felt here, as in other parts of Wallonia. Today, the city has started to prosper again, thanks in part to its tin products and tourist activity.

In 1970, the Tihange Nuclear Power Station was built nearby.

=== Folklore ===
Every seven years, a religious procession takes place in the so-called 'septennial festivities' in commemoration of the end of a drought in 1656. The last one took place on 15 August 2019.

== Main sights ==
The four 'wonders of Huy' are (in Huy dialect):

- Li Pontia, the bridge over the River Meuse
- Li Rondia, the rose window of the Gothic Notre-Dame collegiate church
- Li Bassinia, the 15th-century fountain that stands in the middle of the Grand Place
- Li Tchestia or the Citadel of Huy, the 1818 fortress that dominates the city
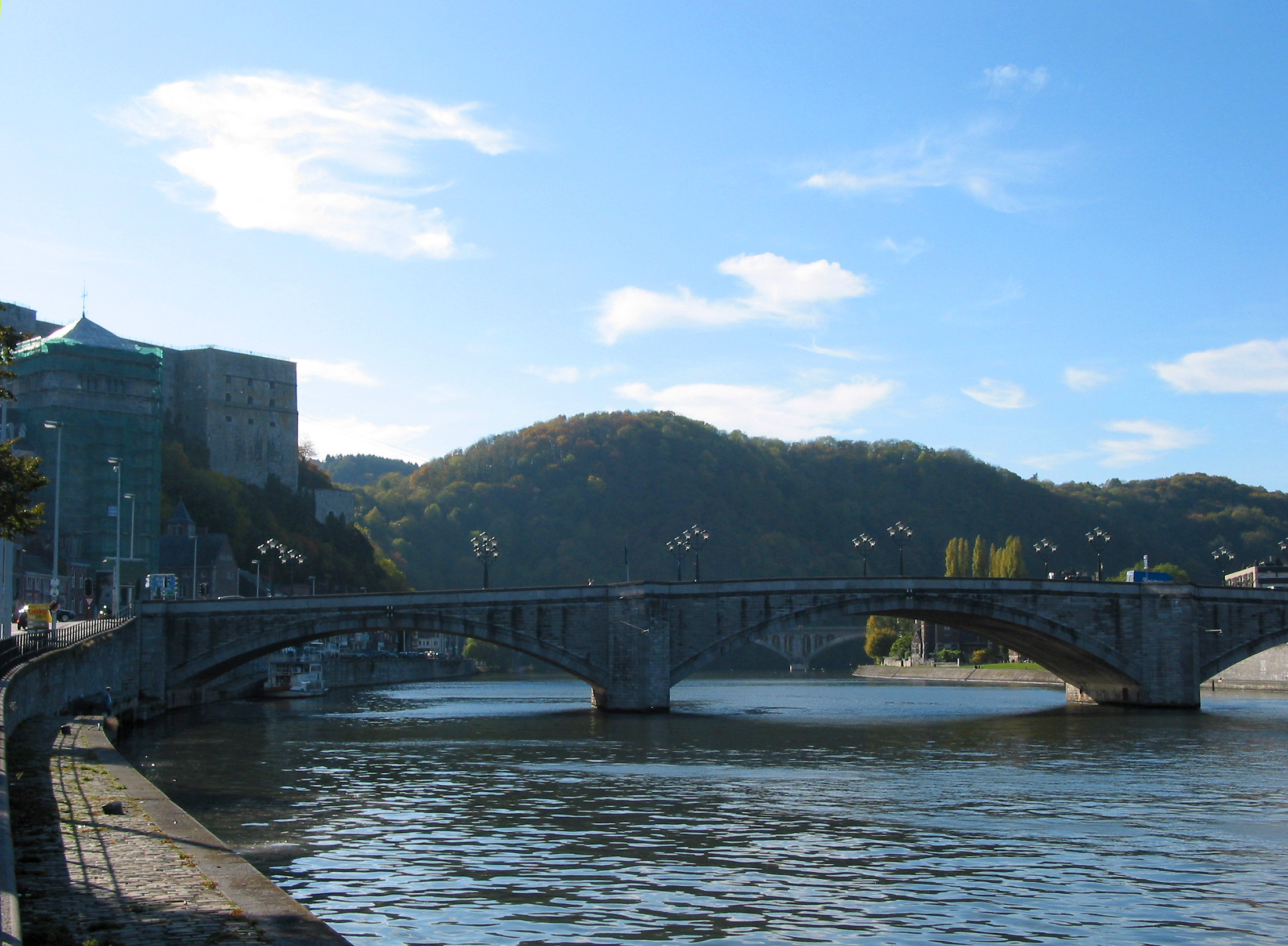
'Li Pontia'

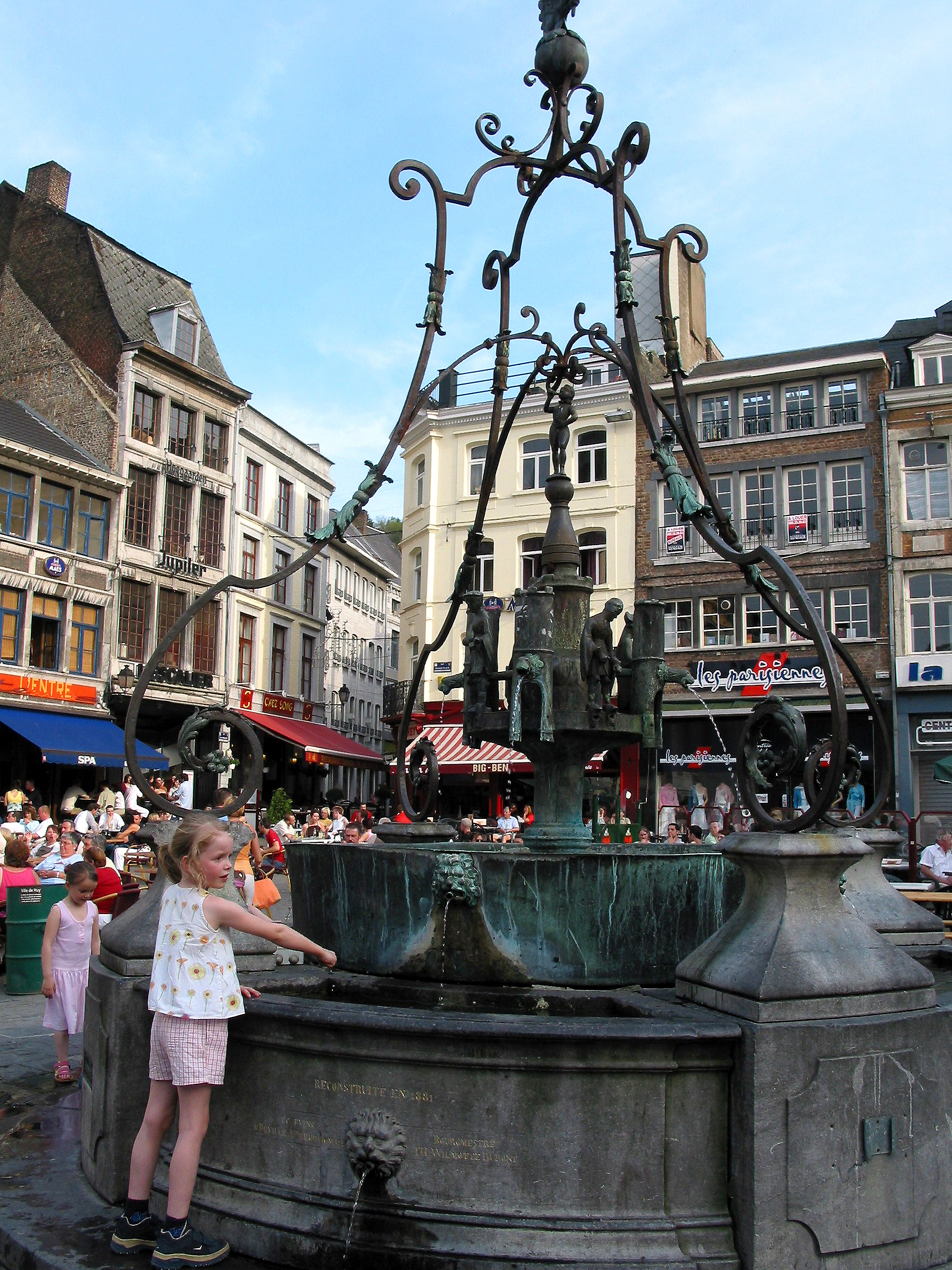
'Li Bassinia'

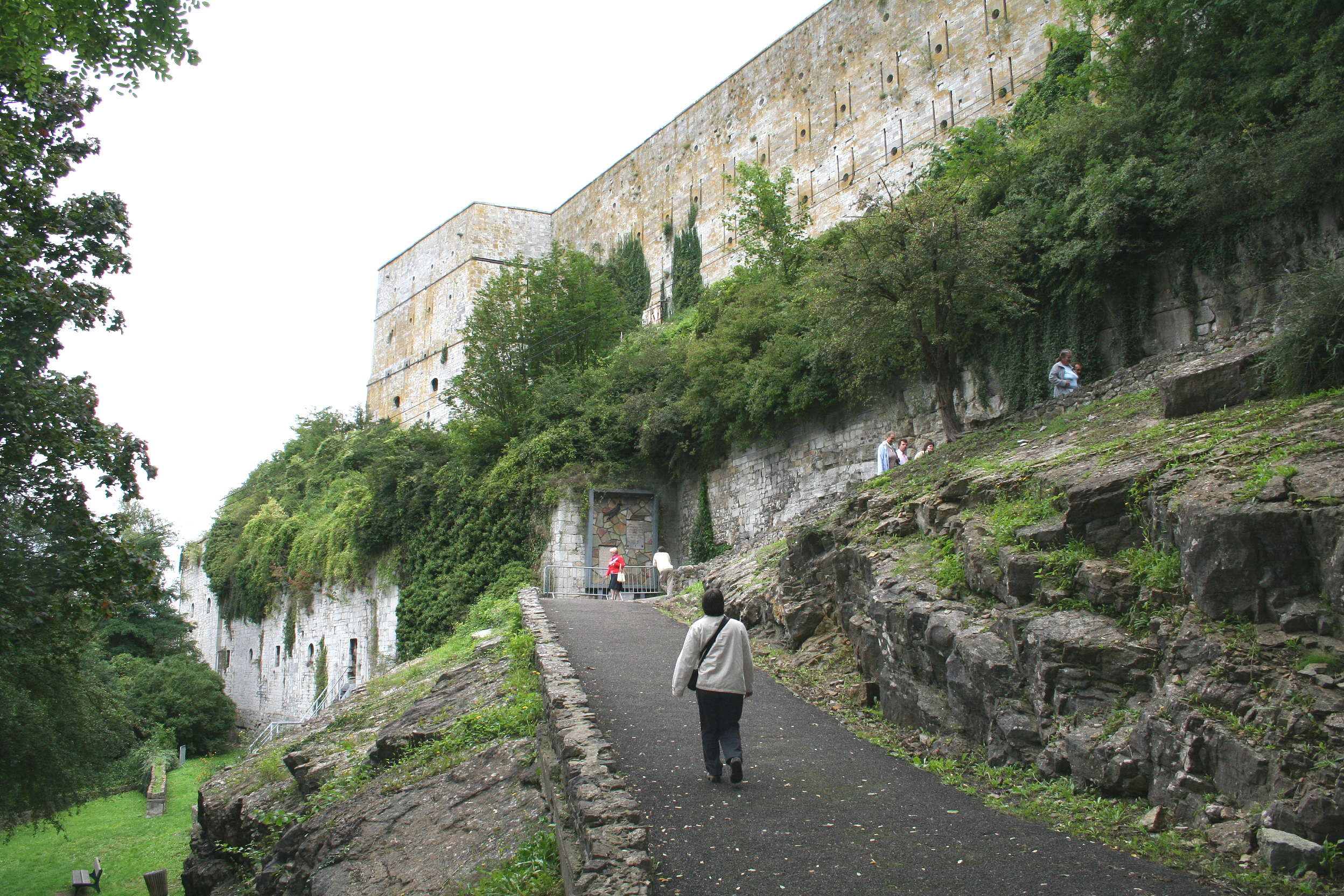
'Li Tchestia'

== Cycling ==
Huy is home to the finish of La Flèche Wallonne (English: Walloon Arrow; Dutch: Waalse Pijl), an important 1-day cycling race held midweek in mid-April. The race traverses, and finishes, at the summit of the Mur de Huy (English: Wall of Huy), a climb of about 1 kilometer with an average gradient of 10%, with sections of 20%. Huy has also been used in the Tour de France four times: 1995, 2001, 2006 and 2015.

== In popular culture ==
Huy was used as a location for the first series of the 2014 BBC television drama series The Missing.

== Famous persons ==
- Meingold of Huy, Roman Catholic saint (died 892)
- Peter the Hermit, instigator of the First Crusade (1050 in Amiens - 1115 in Huy)
- Renier de Huy, metalworker (first half of the 12th century)
- Yvette of Huy, anchoress (1158–1228)
- Patrick Sarsfield, 1st Earl of Lucan, (1660 – 21 August 1693). Cavalry commander of Jacobite forces at the Siege of Limerick, Ireland, General in French Army following "Flight of the Wild Geese" is buried here, in the graveyard of St. Martin's Church.
- John Joseph Merlin, inventor of the roller skate (17 September 1735 in Huy - 4 May 1803 in London)
- Joseph Lebeau, politician (1794–1865)
- Le Père Pire, recipient of the 1958 Nobel Peace Prize, lived in Huy (10 February 1910 in Dinant - 30 January 1969)
- Anne-Marie Lizin, politician (1949–2015)
- André Malherbe, three-time motocross world champion (born in 1956)

== International relations ==
=== Twin towns – Sister cities ===
Huy is twinned with:

Compiègne, France; Port-Bouet, near Abidjan, Ivory Coast; Vianden, Luxembourg; Seosan, South Korea	Arona, Italy; (United Kingdom) Bury St Edmunds, UK; Natitingou, Benin; Montagano, Italy	Tienen, Belgium; Krujë, Albania; Vélingara, Senegal; Taizhou, Jiangsu, China

== Gallery ==
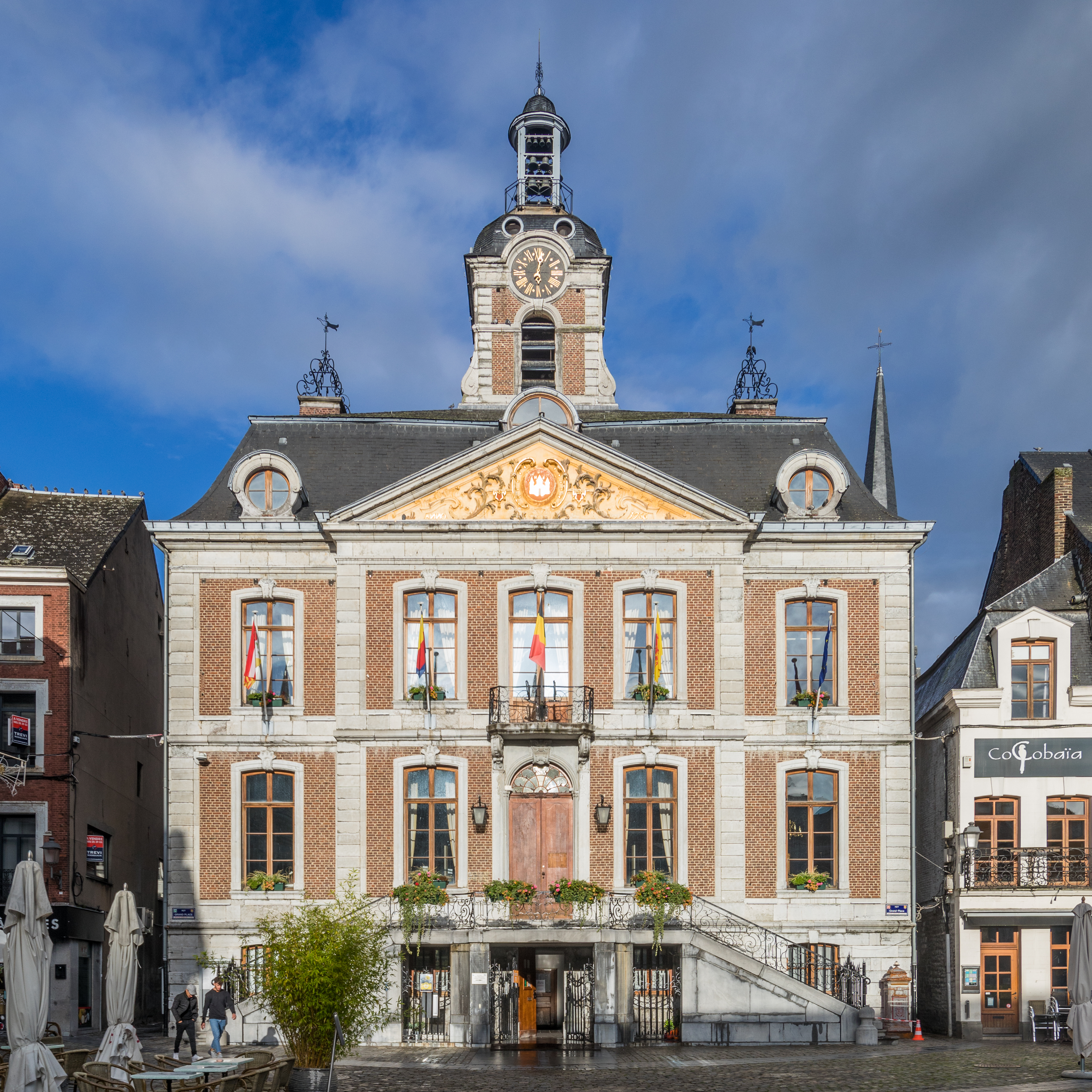
Huy town hall

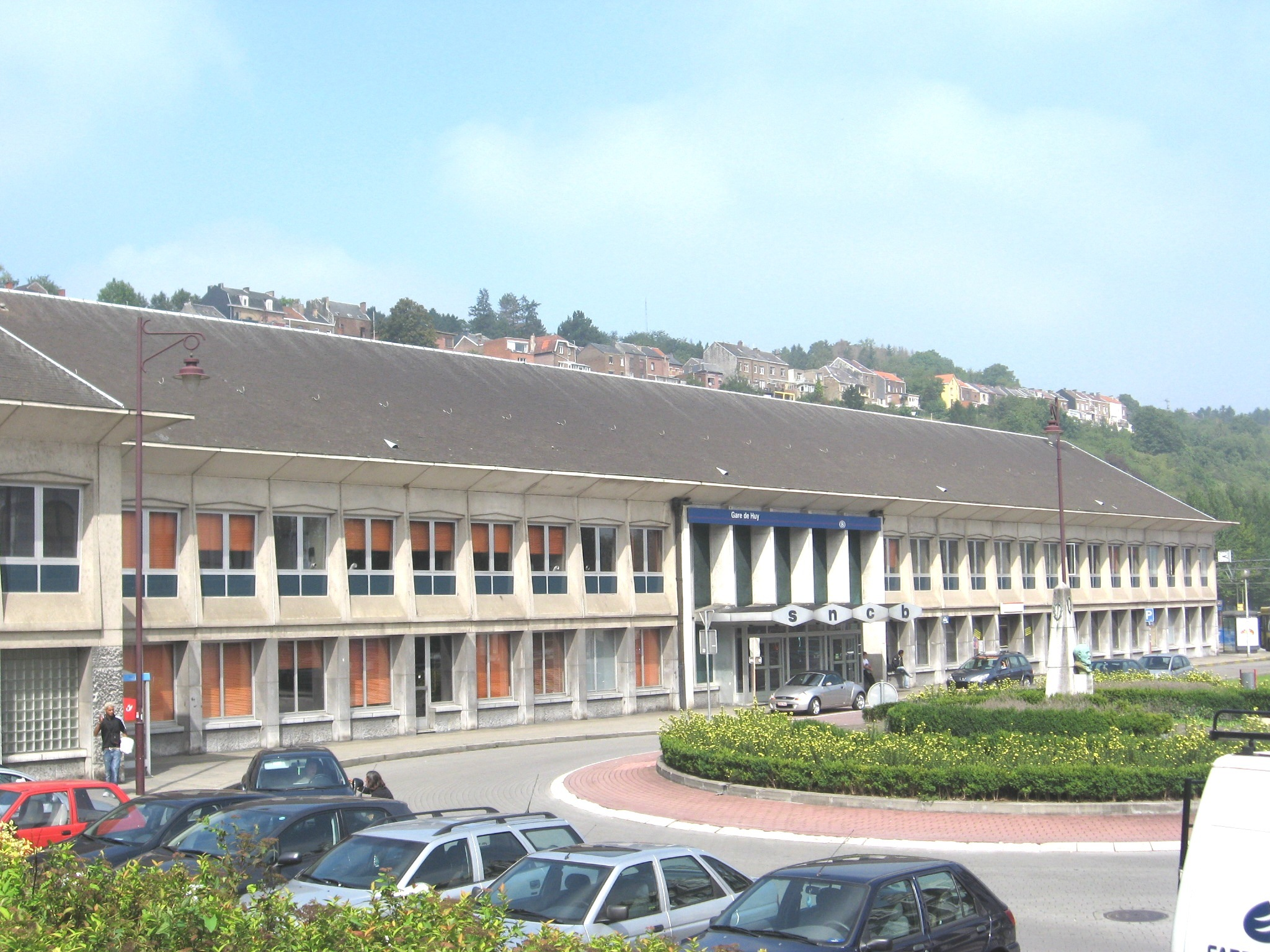
Huy train station

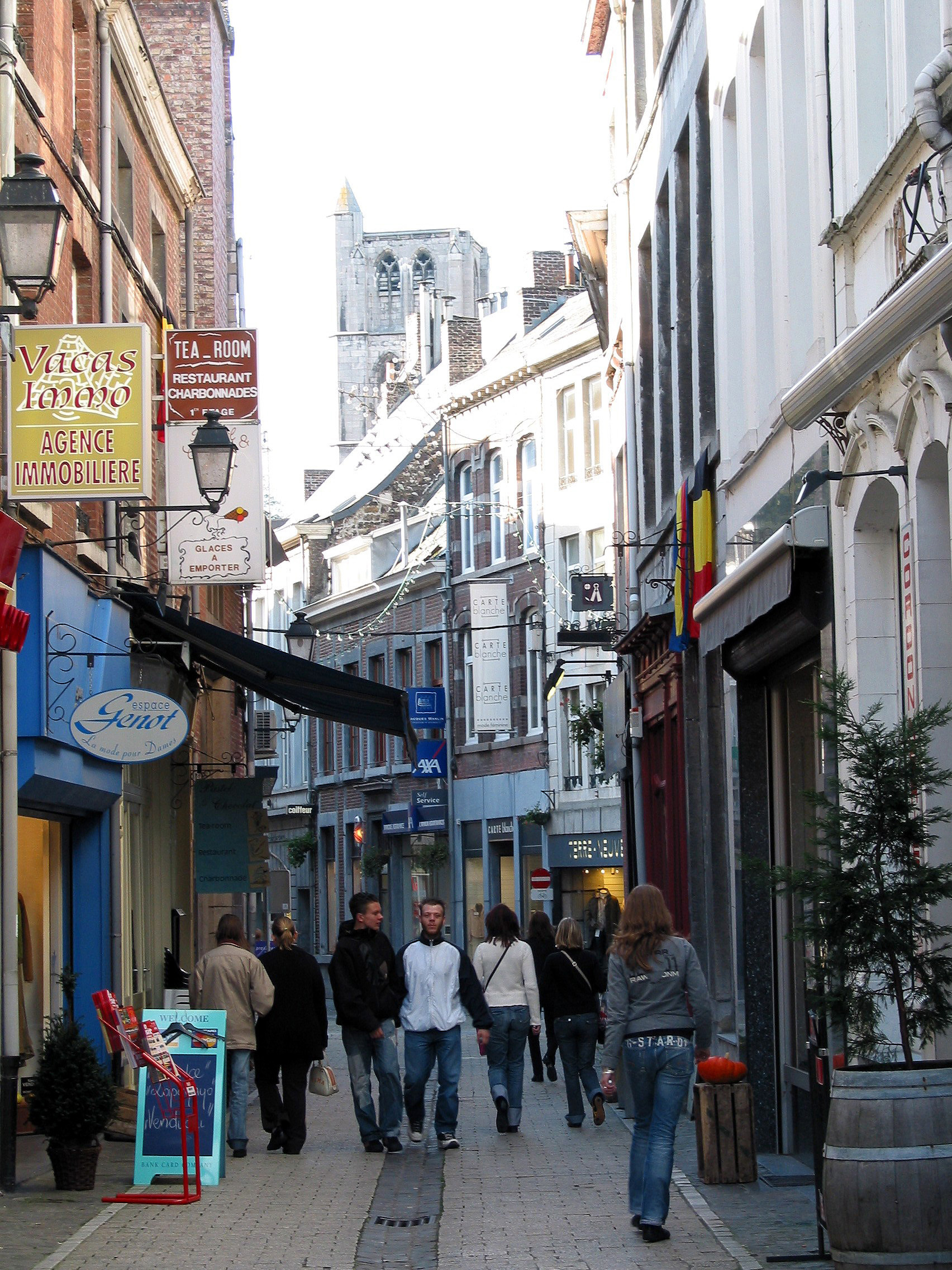
Old street of Huy

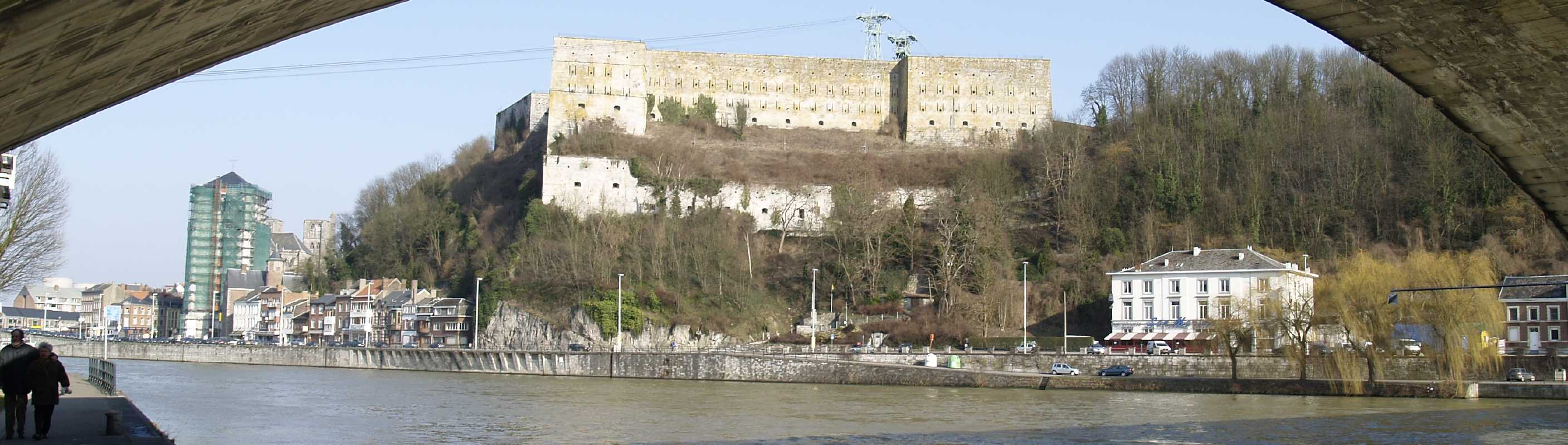
City and fortress
