= Hoyoux =

River in Belgium

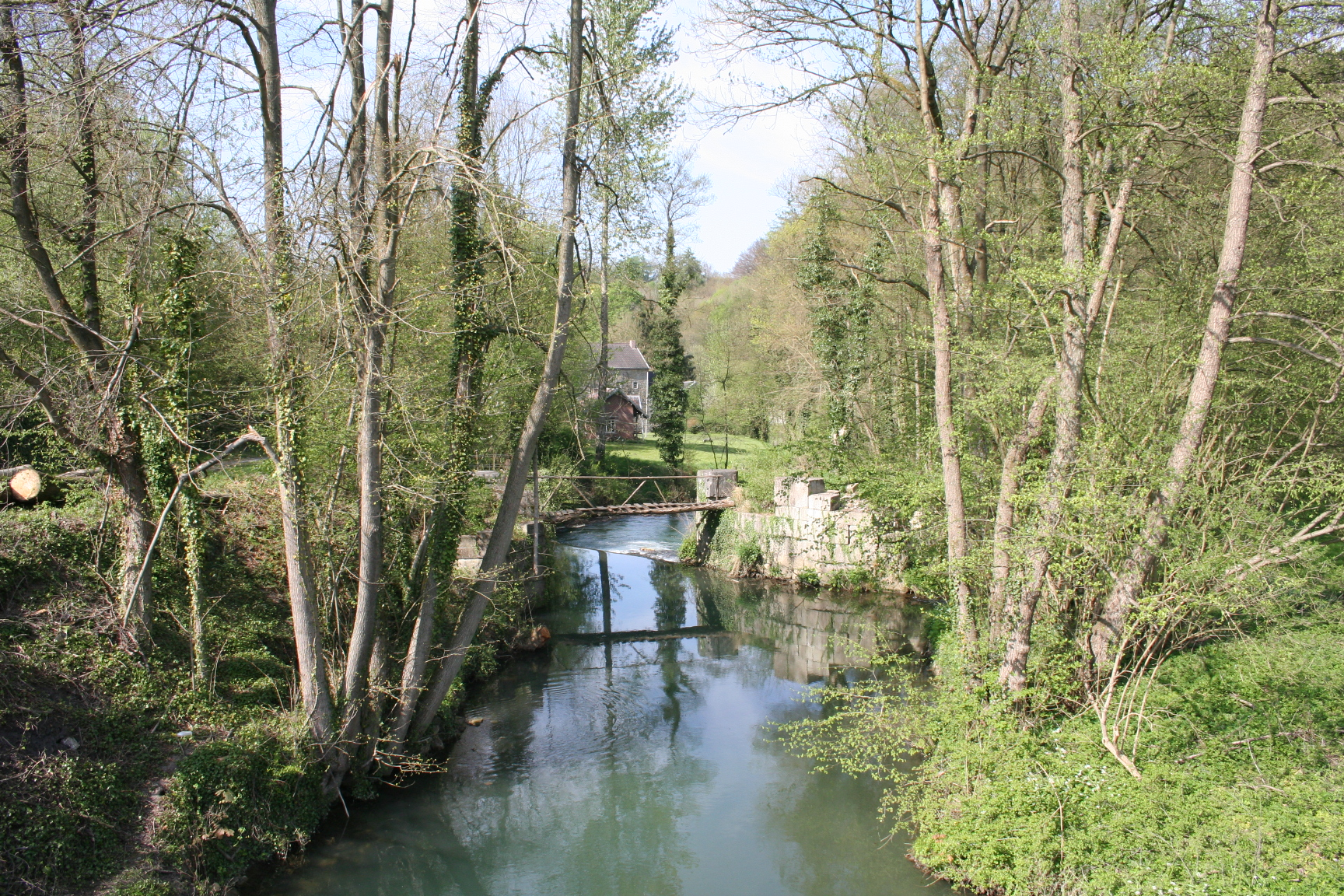

Location
- Country: Belgium

Physical characteristics
- Source
  - location: Liège Province
- Mouth
  - location: Meuse
  - coordinates: 50.5197°N 5.2383°E
- Length: 28 km (17 mi)

Basin features
- Progression: Meuse→ North Sea

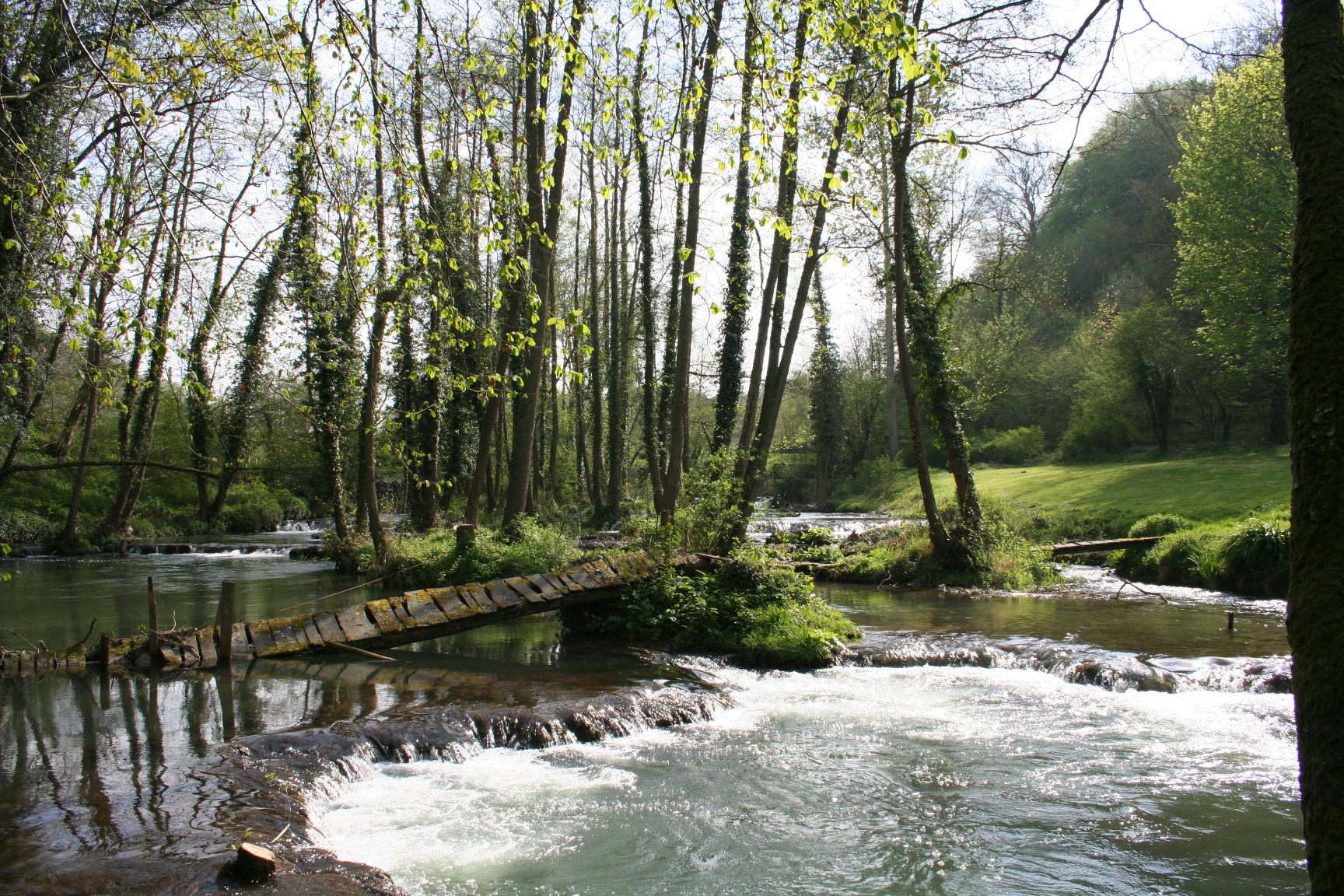
Hoyoux

The Hoyoux (French pronunciation: [ɔju]) is a river of Belgium, a right tributary of the Meuse. It flows for 28 kilometres (17 mi) through the province of Liège in the northern-central part of the country. It flows into the Meuse in Huy.
