= Modave =

Municipality in Liège Province, Wallonia, Belgium

Modave Modåve (Walloon)
- Municipality
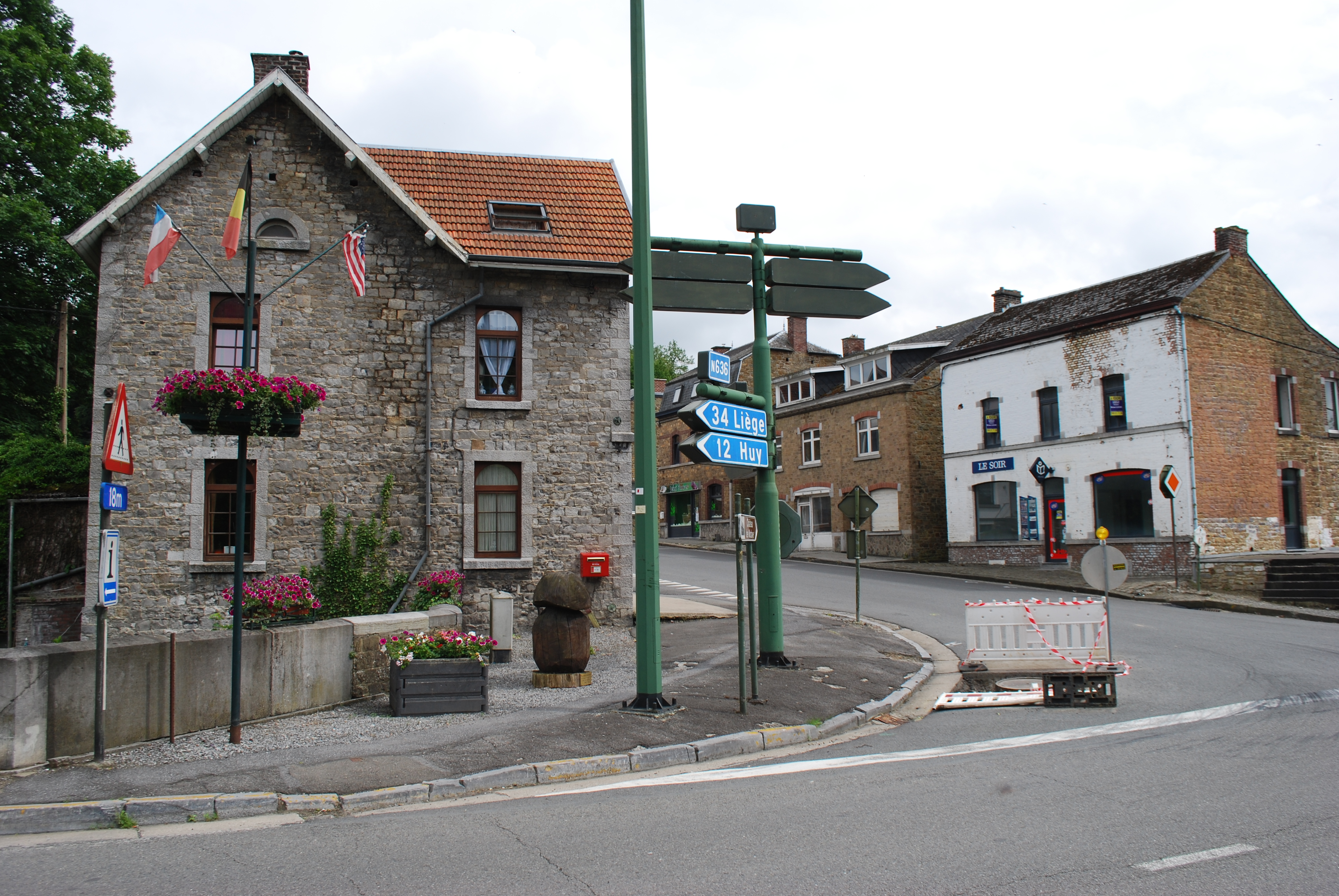

- Flag Coat of arms

- Location of Modave in the province of Liège
- Interactive map of Modave
- Location in Belgium
- Coordinates: 50°27′N 05°18′E
- Country: Belgium
- Community: French Community
- Region: Wallonia
- Province: Liège
- Arrondissement: Huy

Government
  - Mayor: Eric Thomas (OSE)
  - Governing party: OSE

Area
  - Total: 40.42 km^{2} (15.61 sq mi)

Population (2018-01-01)
  - Total: 4,200
  - Density: 100/km^{2} (270/sq mi)
- Postal codes: 4577
- NIS code: 61041
- Area codes: 085
- Website: www.modave.be

Modave (French pronunciation: [mɔdav]; Walloon: Modåve) is a municipality of Wallonia located in the province of Liège, Belgium.

On January 1, 2006, Modave had a total population of 3,722. The total area is 40.37 km^{2} which gives a population density of 92 inhabitants per km^{2}.

The municipality consists of the following districts: Modave, Outrelouxhe, Strée, and Vierset-Barse. The hamlet of Limet is also part of Modave municipality.

The Château des Comtes de Marchin or Modave Castle is situated near the village of Modave. Rennequin Sualem built here what became the model for the famous Machine de Marly, which he invented.

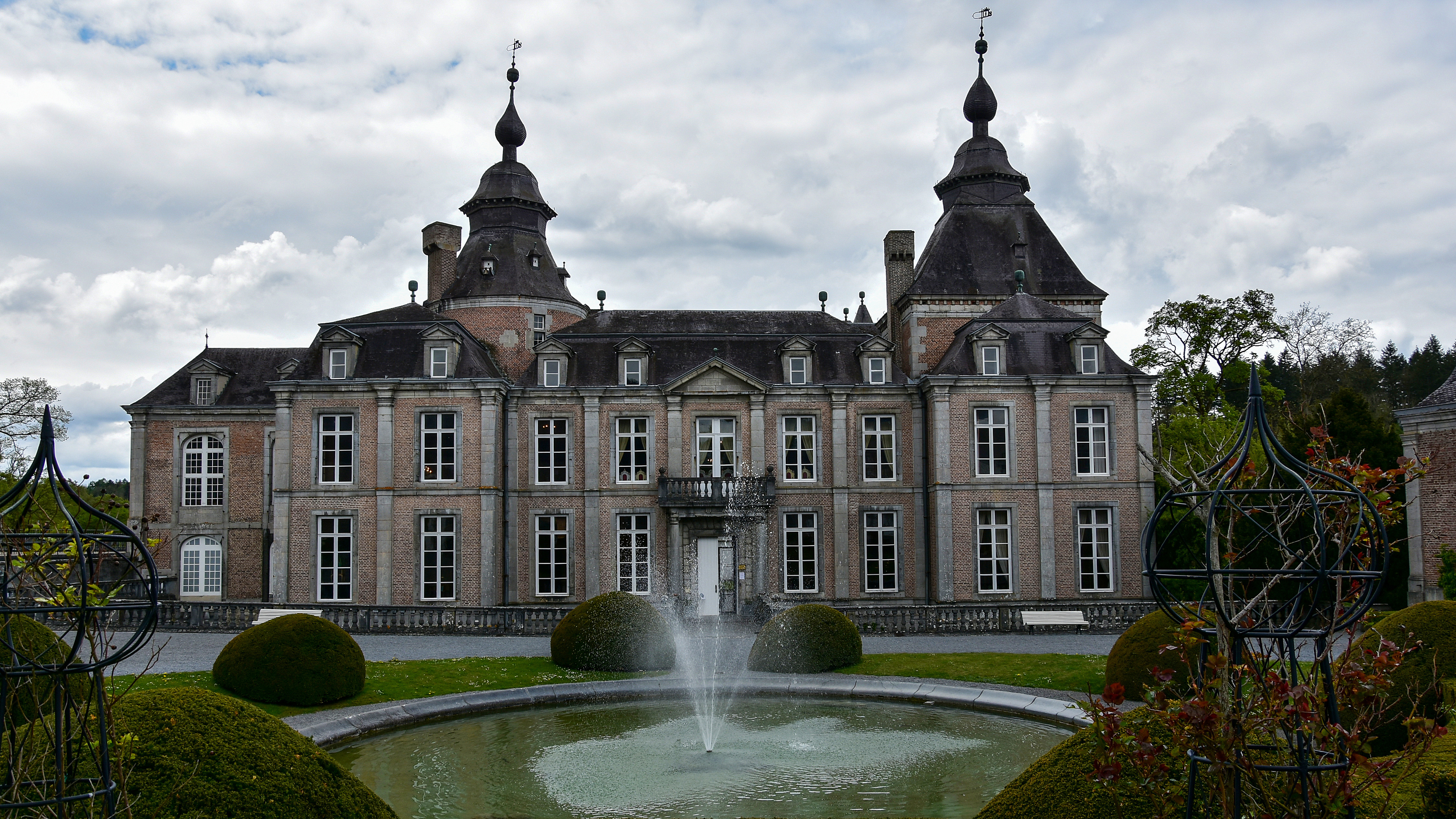
Modave Castle

== See also ==
- List of protected heritage sites in Modave
