= Poilvache Castle =

- Yvoir, Wallonia, Belgium
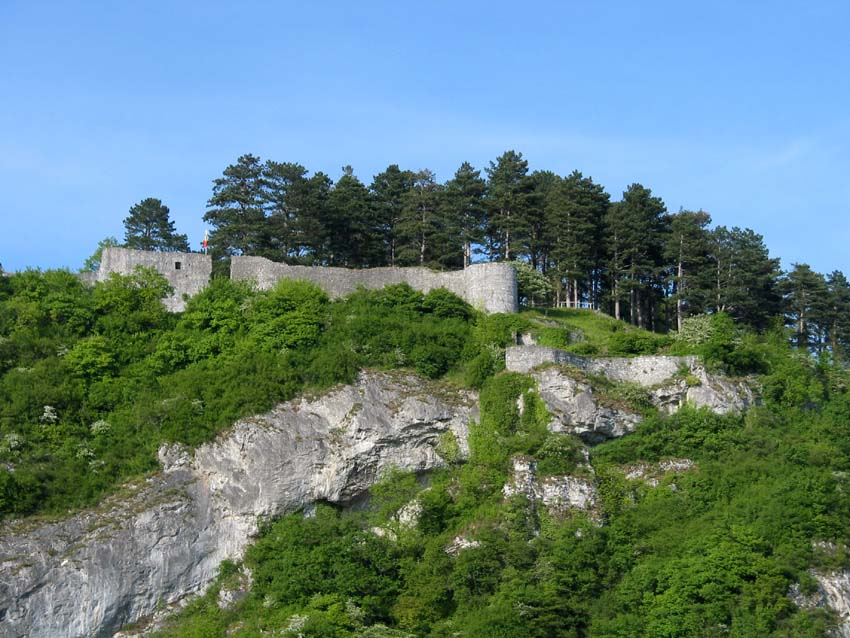

Site information
- Type: Castle

Location
- Coordinates: 50.305°N 4.900°E

Poilvache Castle (French: Château de Poilvache) is a ruined medieval castle in the Walloon municipality of Yvoir in the province of Namur, Belgium, overlooking the village of Houx from a clifftop on the river Meuse.

== History ==
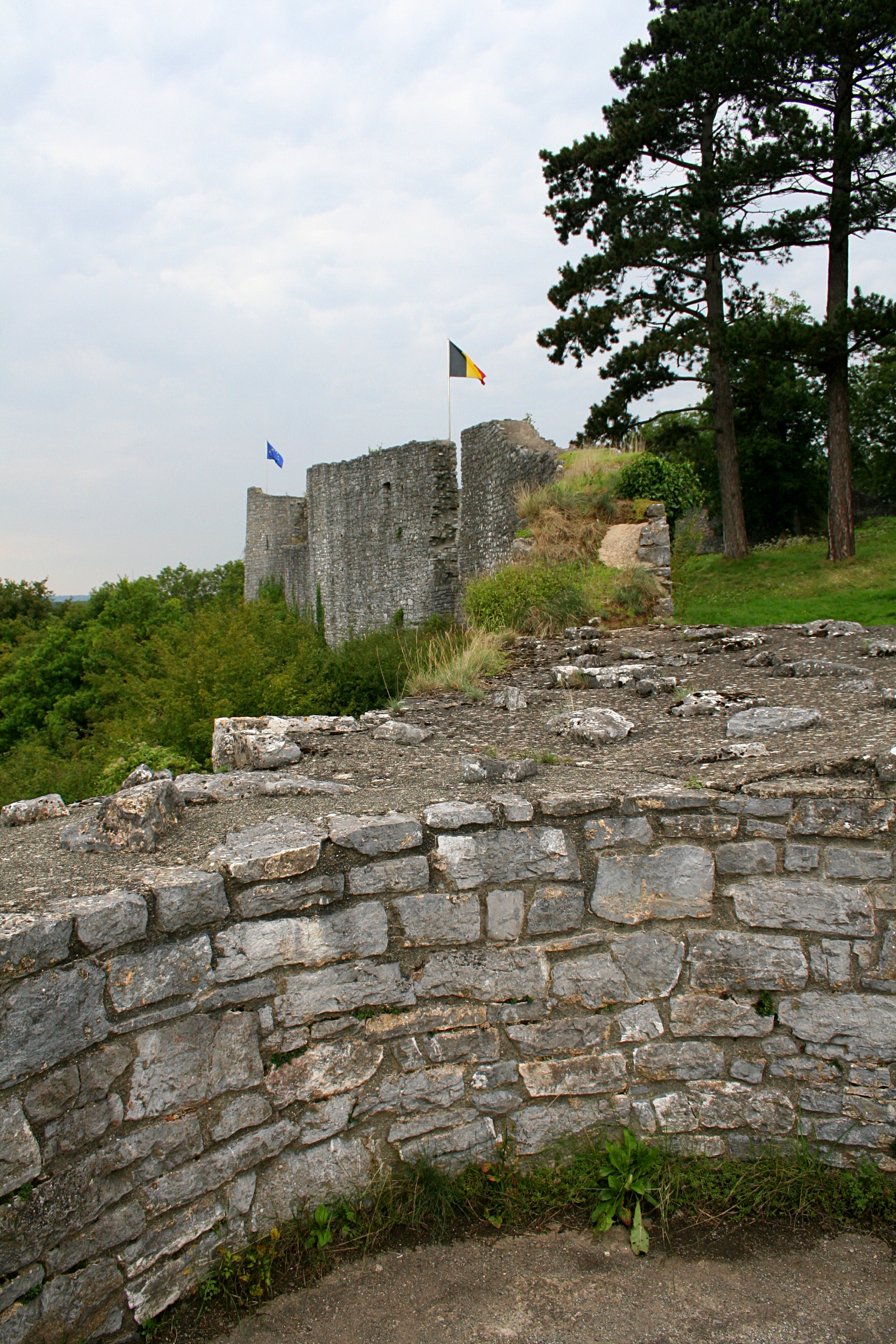

The present ruins date from the 15th century, although there has been a fortification on the site since the time of Charlemagne. The Liégeois town of Poilvache, a thriving walled town, protected by a castle, with a prosperous economy and its own mint, and allied to Duke Philippe the Good, virtually ceased to exist following its 1430 siege by the rebellious Prince-Bishop of Liège, Jean de Heynsbergh, and an estimated army of 30,000 Liégeois, Dinantais and Hutois. The Dinantais besiege Montaigle Castle in 1465 for the same reasons but Montaigle was destroyed in the 16th century by the army of Henri II of France.

It is impossible to see the whole site of Poilvache but it is the whole site which is ranked as Wallonia's Major Heritage.

From the top of these rocks it is possible to see the isle in the river where the German army and its armoured divisions crossed (in the North of the isle), the river Meuse on 13 May 1940.

== See also ==
- List of castles in Belgium
- List of protected heritage sites in Yvoir
