= List of protected heritage sites in Onhaye =

This table shows an overview of the protected heritage sites in the Walloon town Onhaye. This list is part of Belgium's national heritage.

Object	Year/architect	Town/section	Address	Coordinates	Number^{?}	Image
Château de Fontaine and environment ^{(nl)} ^{(fr)}		Onhaye		50.233118°N 4.764274°E	91103-CLT-0002-01 Info	Kasteel de Fontaine en omgeving More images
The ruins of the Montaigle castle and its surroundings ^{(nl)} ^{(fr)}		Onhaye		50.293057°N 4.813135°E	91103-CLT-0003-01 Info	De ruïnes van kasteel de Montaigle en haar omgeving More images
The ruins of the Montaigle castle and its surroundings ^{(nl)} ^{(fr)}		Onhaye		50.293057°N 4.813135°E	91103-PEX-0001-01 Info	De ruïnes van kasteel de Montaigle en haar omgeving More images
The ruins of the castle of Montaigle ^{(nl)} ^{(fr)}		Onhaye		50.293226°N 4.815585°E	91103-CLT-0004-01 Info	De ruines van kasteel de Montaigle More images
An extension of the area of the ruins of the castle of Montaigle (+ ANHEE / Haut-le-wastia) ^{(nl)} ^{(fr)}		Onhaye		50.295633°N 4.815005°E	91103-CLT-0005-01 Info	Een uitbreiding van het gebied van de ruïnes van het kasteel de Montaigle (+ANHEE/Haut-le-Wastia) More images
An extension of the area of the ruins of the castle of Montaigle (+ ANHEE / Haut-le-wastia) ^{(nl)} ^{(fr)}		Onhaye		50.295633°N 4.815005°E	91103-PEX-0002-01 Info	Een uitbreiding van het gebied van de ruïnes van het kasteel de Montaigle (+ANHEE/Haut-le-Wastia) More images
Falaën Castle and its immediate surroundings ^{(nl)} ^{(fr)}		Onhaye		50.277831°N 4.795042°E	91103-CLT-0006-01 Info	Kasteel de Falaën en haar directe omgeving More images
The choir of the old church of Serville, which is converted into a chapel ^{(nl)} ^{(fr)}		Onhaye		50.249852°N 4.780734°E	91103-CLT-0007-01 Info	
Lane of lime trees and its surroundings ^{(nl)} ^{(fr)}		Onhaye		50.248564°N 4.770061°E	91103-CLT-0008-01 Info	

== See also ==
- List of protected heritage sites in Namur (province)
