= Spontin Castle =

Medieval castle in Spontin, Yvoir, Namur, Wallonia, Belgium

- Yvoir, Wallonia, Belgium
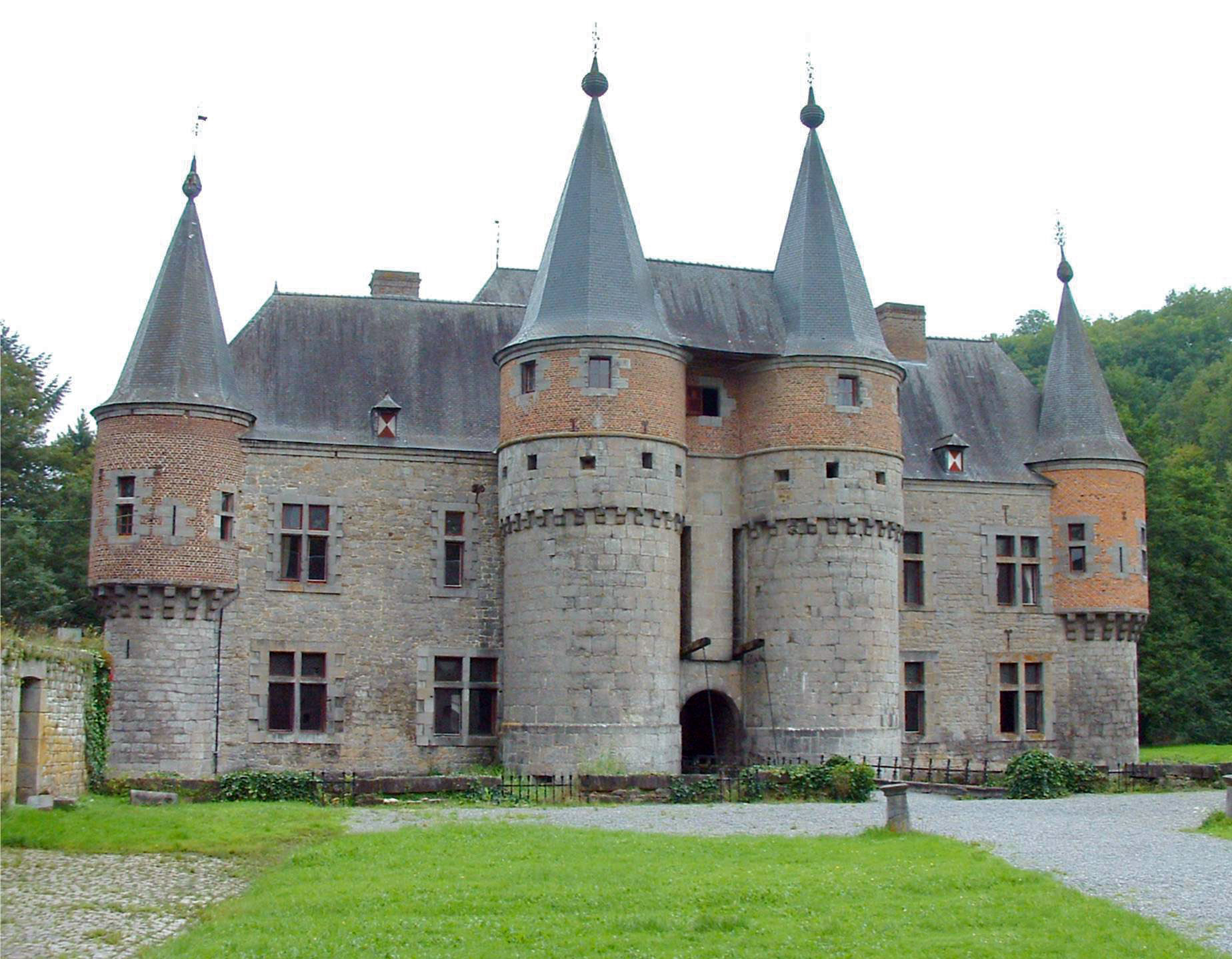

Site information
- Type: Castle
- Owner: SA Société du Château de Spontin

Location
- Coordinates: 50.32322°N 5.00937°E

Site history
- Built: 12th – 16th centuries

Spontin Castle (French: Château de Spontin) is a medieval castle in the village of Spontin in the municipality of Yvoir, province of Namur, Wallonia, Belgium. It has massive walls, its towers topped with slate and a moat with drawbridge.

== History ==
Spontin was built in a bend of the Bocq, whose water flows around the castle along some cascading waterfalls

The castle belonged to the noble family of Beaufort (named after a castle near Huy). Between 1266 and 1284, Pierre de Beaufort built the main tower which is the core of the castle. In 1288, his son William (Guillaume), nicknamed the "Ardennes", participated in the Battle of Woeringen. For his bravery in battle, in which Henry VII of Luxembourg was defeated, he was rewarded with the fiefdom of Spontin. From that time, the lords of the castle Spontin constantly added various outbuildings up to the 16th century when it gained its present form.

Spontin Castle was on a 'dangerous' place in the border region between the County of Namur and the Principality of Liège, and although it was assaulted by armies from Liege, Dinant, Burgundy, and France, it was never taken.

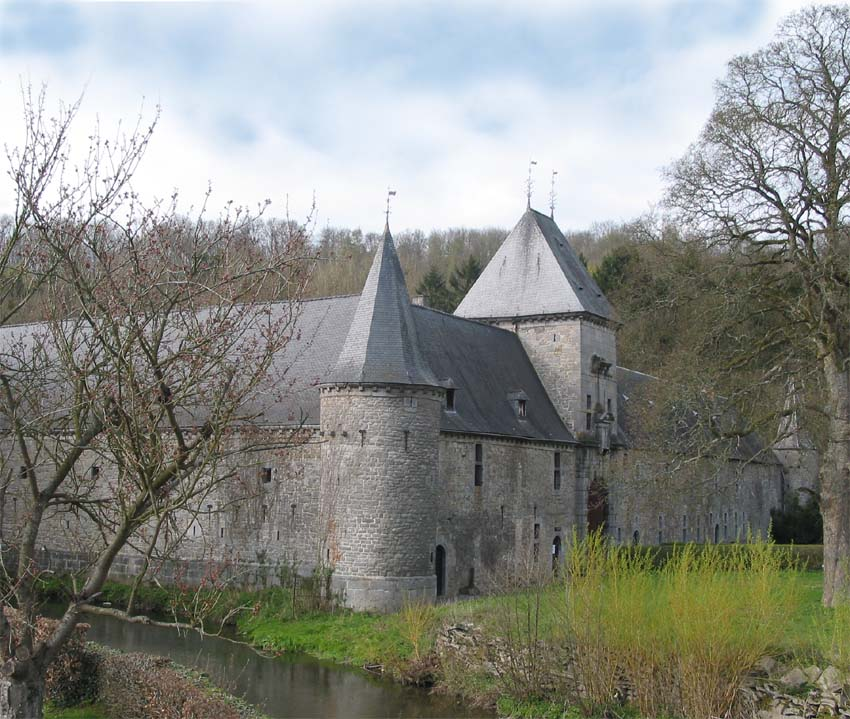
The Bocq flows past the castle.

From the late sixteenth century, the fortifications became redundant and unnecessary, the castle is transformed into a residence by the drilling of windows and is accented with red bricks and roofs pepper. The last two transformations are the construction of a fortified farm beyond the moat (1622) and demolition of the rear part of the fortifications. In the parade, decorated with an elegant frame of wrought iron sink Van Boeckel (nineteenth century), featuring former dungeon. The rooms of the old house, with huge walls, chimneys, and Gothic woodwork Louis XIII, the sandstone paving, constrastent by their austerity with the apartments, and there is a well carved into a wall. The southern part has been decorated in the nineteenth century in the Gothic Revival. Currently, the castle is closed to the public, this is private property.

After the fall of the Ancien Régime, the castle was owned by a number of people, until eventually it was purchased by SA Société du Château de Spontin, which entrusted the management of the association Les Cimaises the Spontin. Due to mismanagement of previous owners, the castle is now in a precarious state of neglect.

== See also ==
- List of castles in Belgium
- List of protected heritage sites in Yvoir
