= List of protected heritage sites in Yvoir =

This table shows an overview of the protected heritage sites in the Walloon town Yvoir. This list is part of Belgium's national heritage.

Object	Year/architect	Town/section	Address	Coordinates	Number^{?}	Image
Mouth of the Bocq ^{(nl)} ^{(fr)}		Yvoir		50.325690°N 4.876976°E	91141-CLT-0002-01 Info	
Mill square ^{(nl)} ^{(fr)}		Yvoir	Évrehailles	50.326091°N 4.912615°E	91141-CLT-0003-01 Info	
Buildings belonging to the Seigneurie de Godinne, namely: the tower of Saint-Pierre Church, the castle in Spanish Renaissance style and the large farm, which is separated from the rest by the course of the Rouillon river, and the whole formed by the buildings and their sides. ^{(nl)} ^{(fr)}		Yvoir		50.350126°N 4.866500°E	91141-CLT-0004-01 Info	Gebouwen die toebehoorden aan de Heer van Godinne, te weten: de toren van de Saint-Pierrekerk, het kasteel in Spaanse Renaissancestijl en de grote hoeve, die van de rest gescheiden wordt door de roete de Rouillon, alsook het geheel gevormd door genoemde gebouwen en hun zijdes.
Site of "Mont-sur-Meuse" ^{(nl)} ^{(fr)}		Yvoir		50.358157°N 4.876888°E	91141-CLT-0005-01 Info	
Spontin Castle, the farm and the whole thereof ^{(nl)} ^{(fr)}		Yvoir		50.323519°N 5.007849°E	91141-CLT-0006-01 Info	Kasteel van Spontin, de hoeve en het geheel hiervan. More images
Ruins of Poilvache Castle and the surroundings ^{(nl)} ^{(fr)}		Yvoir		50.306751°N 4.892172°E	91141-CLT-0007-01 Info	Ruïnes van het kasteel van Poilvache More images
Ruins of Poilvache Castle ^{(nl)} ^{(fr)}		Yvoir		50.305451°N 4.900727°E	91141-CLT-0008-01 Info	Ruïnes van het kasteel van Poilvache More images
Bois des Roches ^{(nl)} ^{(fr)}		Yvoir		50.339257°N 4.905876°E	91141-CLT-0009-01 Info	
Facade and roof of the station, this ensemble and its environment ^{(nl)} ^{(fr)}		Yvoir		50.348873°N 4.869015°E	91141-CLT-0010-01 Info	Voorgevel en dak van het station, en ensemble door dit en zijn omgeving
Banks of the Meuse, to Tricointe ^{(nl)} ^{(fr)}		Yvoir		50.339654°N 4.881218°E	91141-CLT-0011-01 Info	
Valley of the Meuse between Bouvignes and Houx ^{(nl)} ^{(fr)}		Yvoir		50.273744°N 4.896867°E	91141-CLT-0012-01 Info	
Ruins of Poilvache Castle and surroundings ^{(nl)} ^{(fr)}		Yvoir		50.306751°N 4.892172°E	91141-PEX-0001-01 Info	Ruïnes van het kasteel van Poilvache en omgeving More images
Valley of the Meuse between Bouvignes and Houx ^{(nl)} ^{(fr)}		Yvoir		50.273744°N 4.896867°E	91141-PEX-0002-01 Info	

== See also ==
- List of protected heritage sites in Namur (province)
