= Falaën Castle =

Castle in Wallonia, Belgium

- Onhaye, Wallonia, Belgium
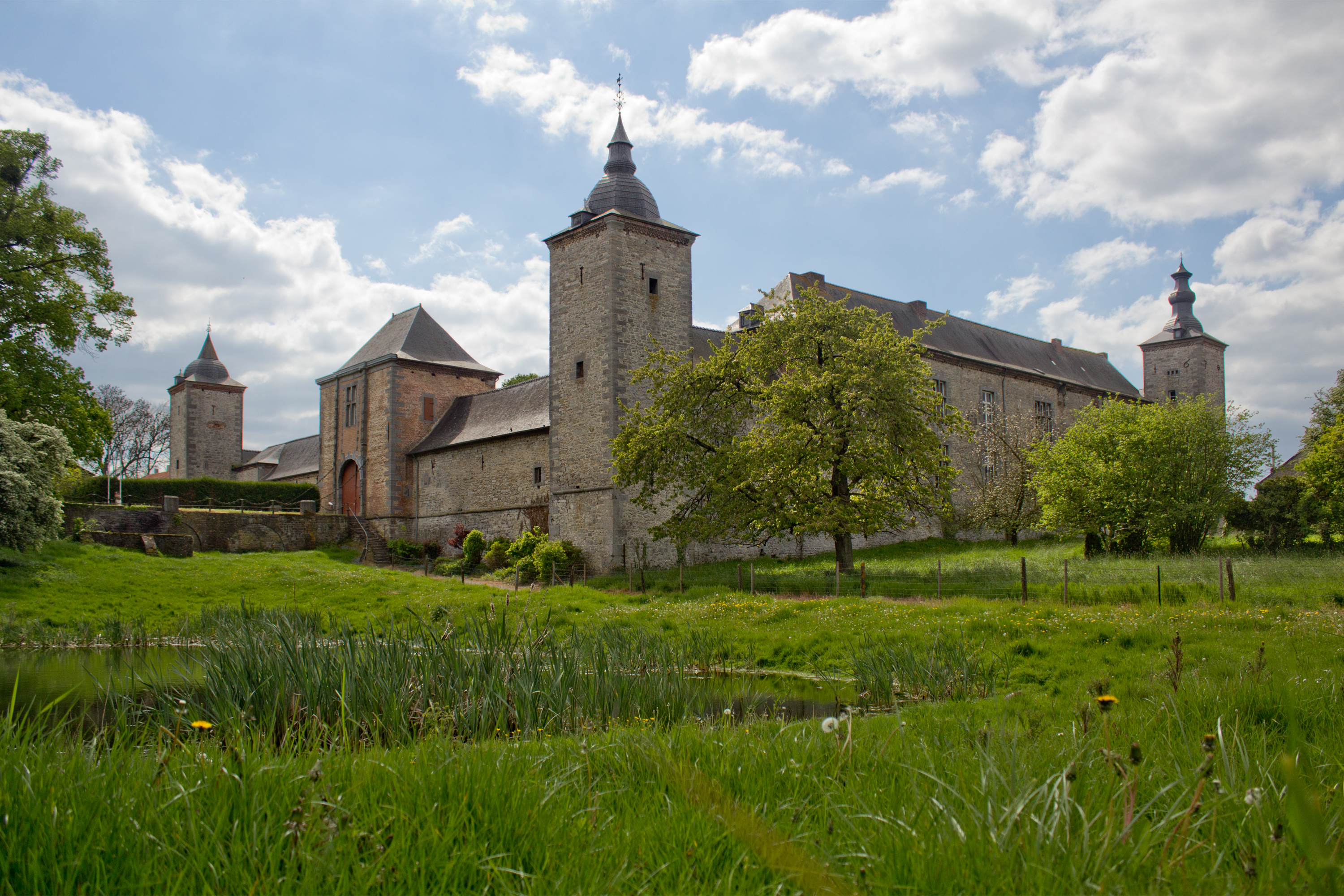

Site information
- Type: Castle

Location
- Coordinates: 50.291°N 4.812°E

Falaën Castle is a château-ferme, or fortified farmhouse, in the village of Falaën, municipality of Onhaye, province of Namur, Wallonia, Belgium. The castle was built between 1670 and 1673 by the Polchet Family to protect themselves from traveling bands of brigands. In the 18th century it was passed to Coppin family. It was then held for another two centuries until being sold to the Delhaye Family, sometime during the 20th century.

== See also ==
- List of castles in Belgium
- List of protected heritage sites in Onhaye
