= Falaën =

Falaën Falayin (Walloon)
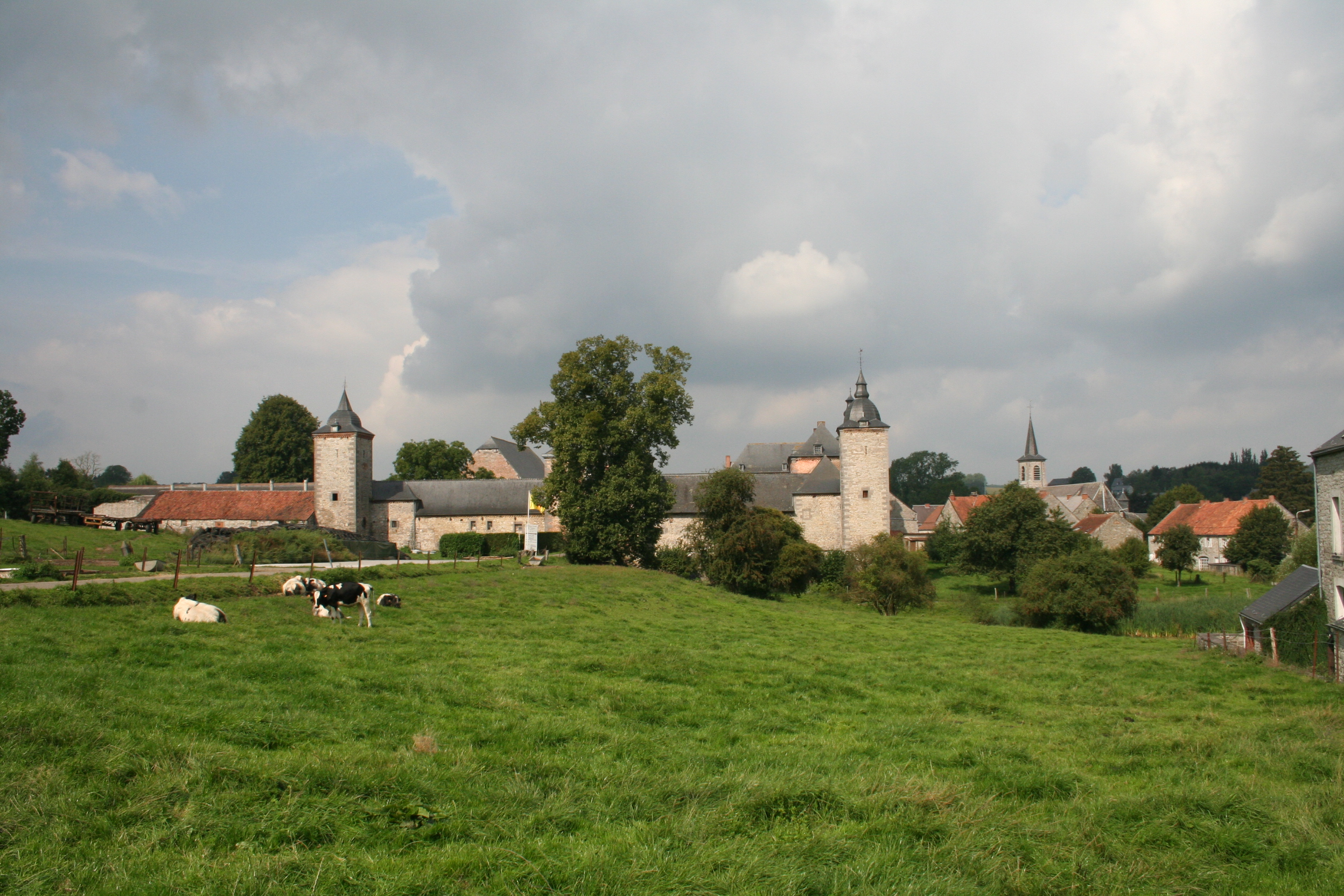

- Location in Belgium
- Coordinates: 50°16′N 04°47′E
- Country: Belgium
- Region: Wallonia
- Province: Namur
- Municipality: Onhaye

Falaën (French pronunciation: [falaɛ̃]; Walloon: Falayin) is a village of Wallonia and a district of the municipality of Onhaye, located in the province of Namur, Belgium.

Falaën is a member of the Les Plus Beaux Villages de Wallonie ("The Most Beautiful Villages of Wallonia") association. Falaën Castle and the ruins of Montaigle Castle are located in the village.
