= Onhaye =

Municipality in Wallonia, Belgium

Onhaye Onhaye (Walloon)
- Municipality
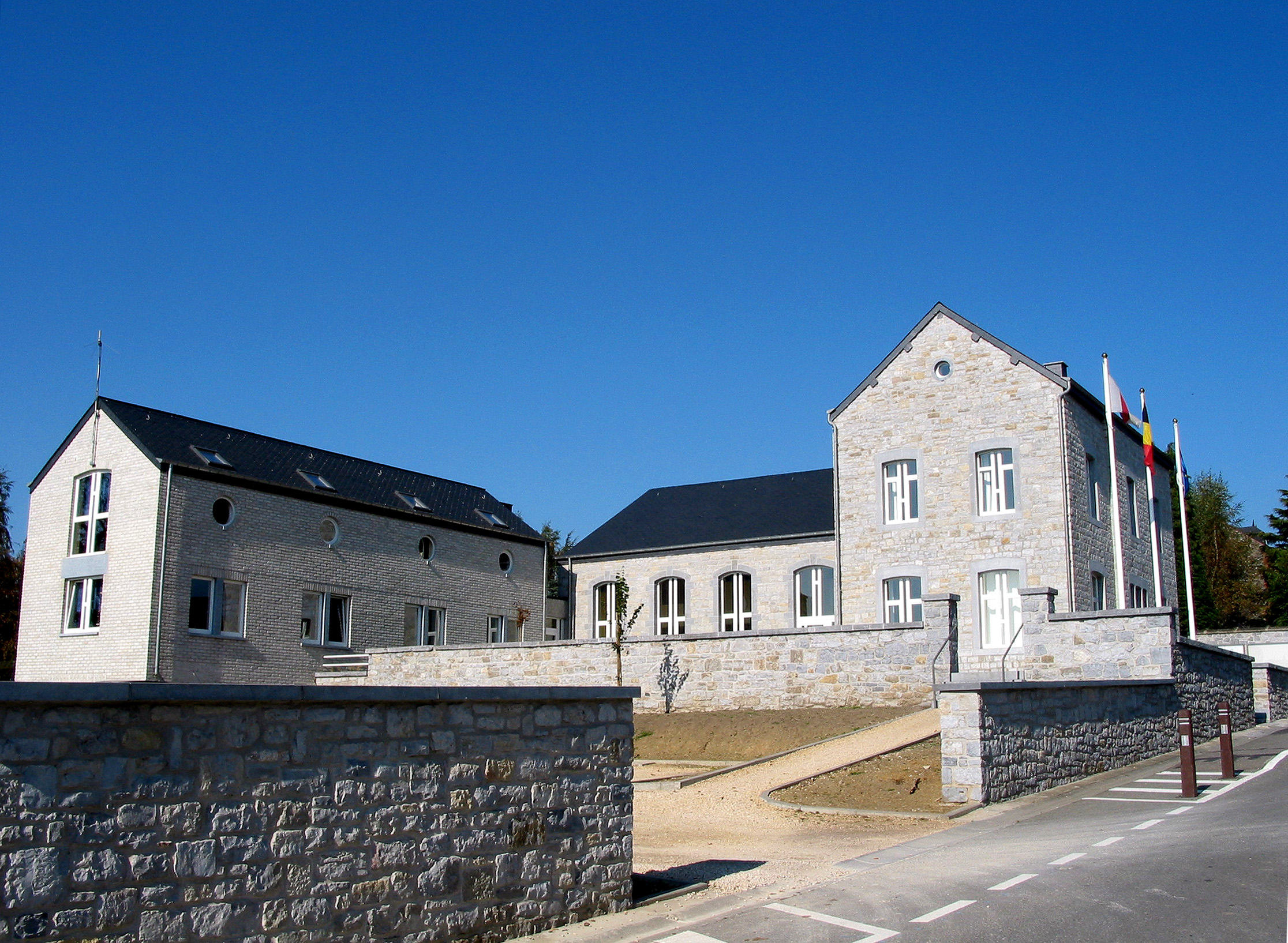
- Onhaye town hall

- Flag Coat of arms

- Location of Onhaye in Namur province
- Interactive map of Onhaye
- Location in Belgium
- Coordinates: 50°15′N 04°50′E
- Country: Belgium
- Community: French Community
- Region: Wallonia
- Province: Namur
- Arrondissement: Dinant

Government
  - Mayor: Christophe Bastin
  - Governing party: ICO

Area
  - Total: 65.67 km^{2} (25.36 sq mi)

Population (2018-01-01)
  - Total: 3,201
  - Density: 48.74/km^{2} (126.2/sq mi)
- Postal codes: 5520-5524
- NIS code: 91103
- Area codes: 082
- Website: www.onhaye.be

Onhaye (French pronunciation: [ɔ̃ɛ]) is a municipality of Wallonia located in the province of Namur, Belgium.

On 1 January 2006 Onhaye had a total population of 3,120. The total area is 65.53 km^{2} (25.30 sq mi) which gives a population density of 48 inhabitants per square kilometre (120/sq mi).

The municipality consists of the following districts: Anthée, Falaën, Gerin, Onhaye, Serville, Sommière, and Weillen.

The region is home to several cultural heritage monuments, such as Château de Fontaine and the fortified farmhouse Falaën Castle.

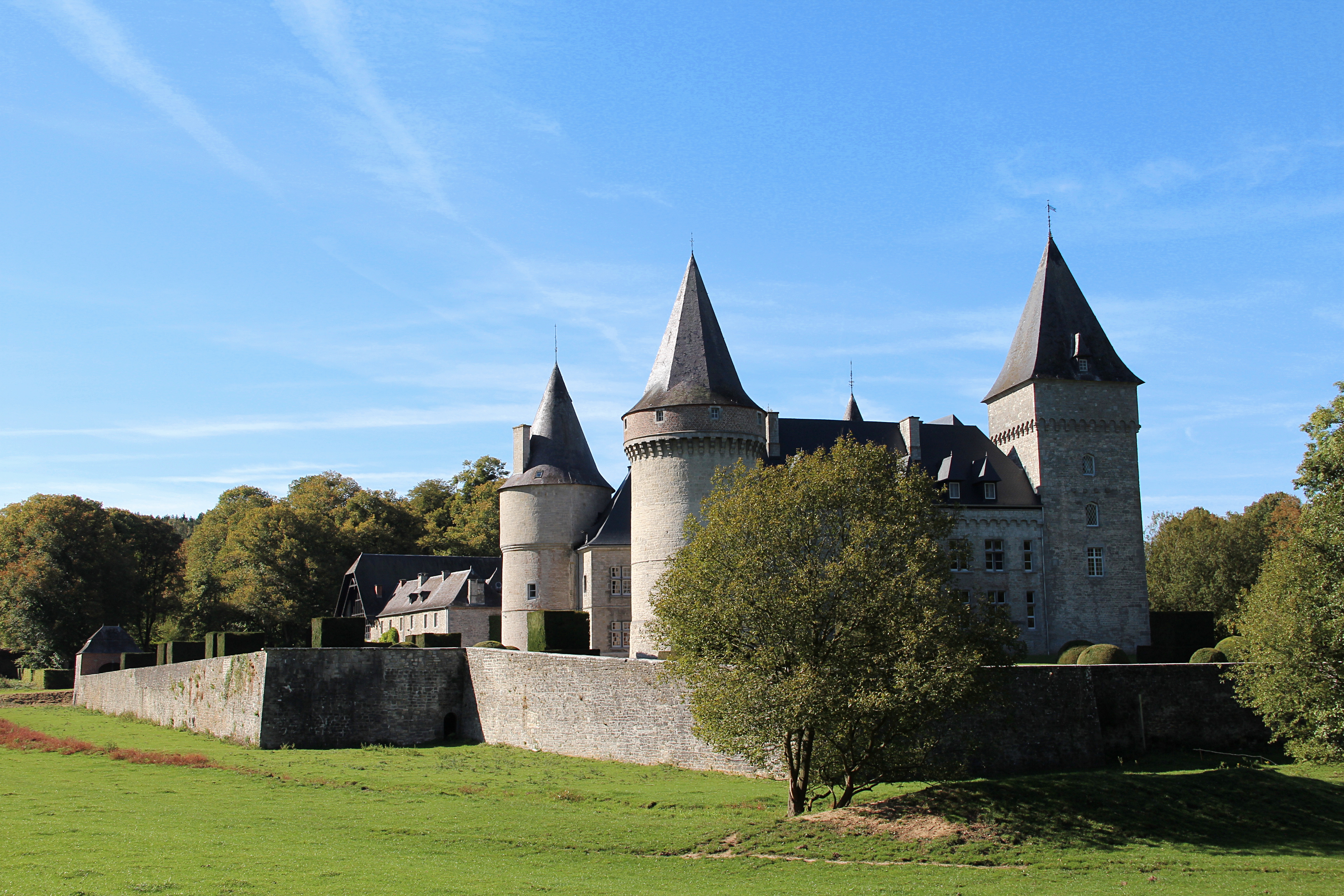
Château de Fontaine, west of Onhaye

== See also ==
- List of protected heritage sites in Onhaye
