= Château de Fontaine =

Castle in Anthée, Belgium

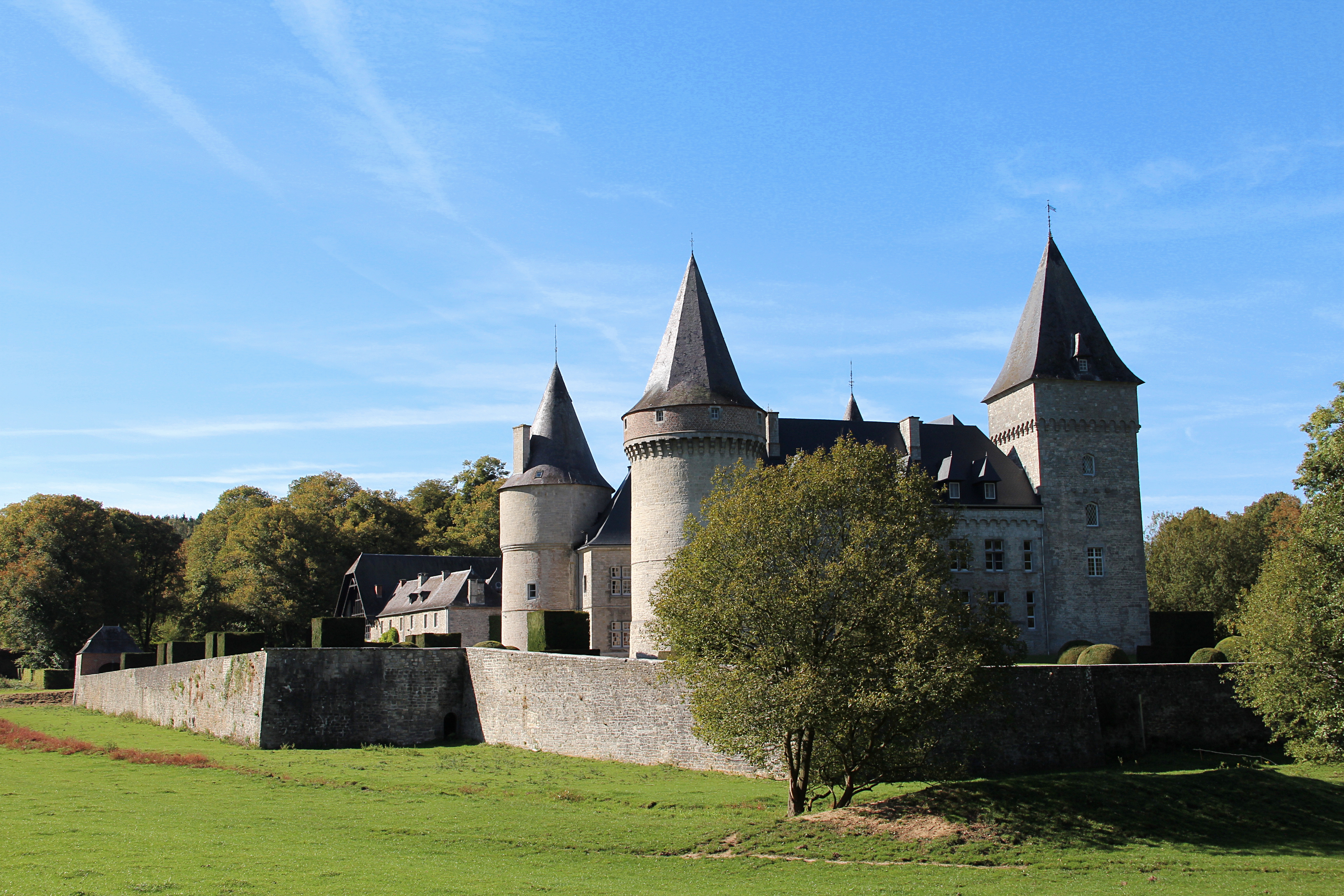
- The chateau seen from the east

- Location within Belgium

General information
- Location: Onhaye, Wallonia, Belgium
- Coordinates: 50.2316°N 4.767°E

The Château de Fontaine is a chateau in the municipality of Onhaye, Wallonia in the Belgian province of Namur. It is located south of the village of Anthée.

The chateau was built near the intersection of the main road from Namur to Luxembourg and the road from Dinant to Liège. The chateau lies to the south of the village of Anthée in a valley surrounded by woods. The chateau replaced a medieval castle, of which there are remains in the north east corner. It was the seat of the lordship of Fontaine, which included Anthée, Morville and Miavoye, spanning the counties of Namur and Agimont in the Prince-Bishopric of Liège.

The chateau is built of limestone, and is U-shaped, open to the south, with towers on each corner. There is a farm to the east with the same plan, with the open side facing the chateau. The two-story chateau was probably built in stages in the 16th century. The other buildings were erected in the 16th and 17th centuries. The chateau was renovated in neo-traditional style between 1907 and 1909. The chateau was given a uniform appearance, with the towers raised and the present windows and other decorations added.

== Gallery ==
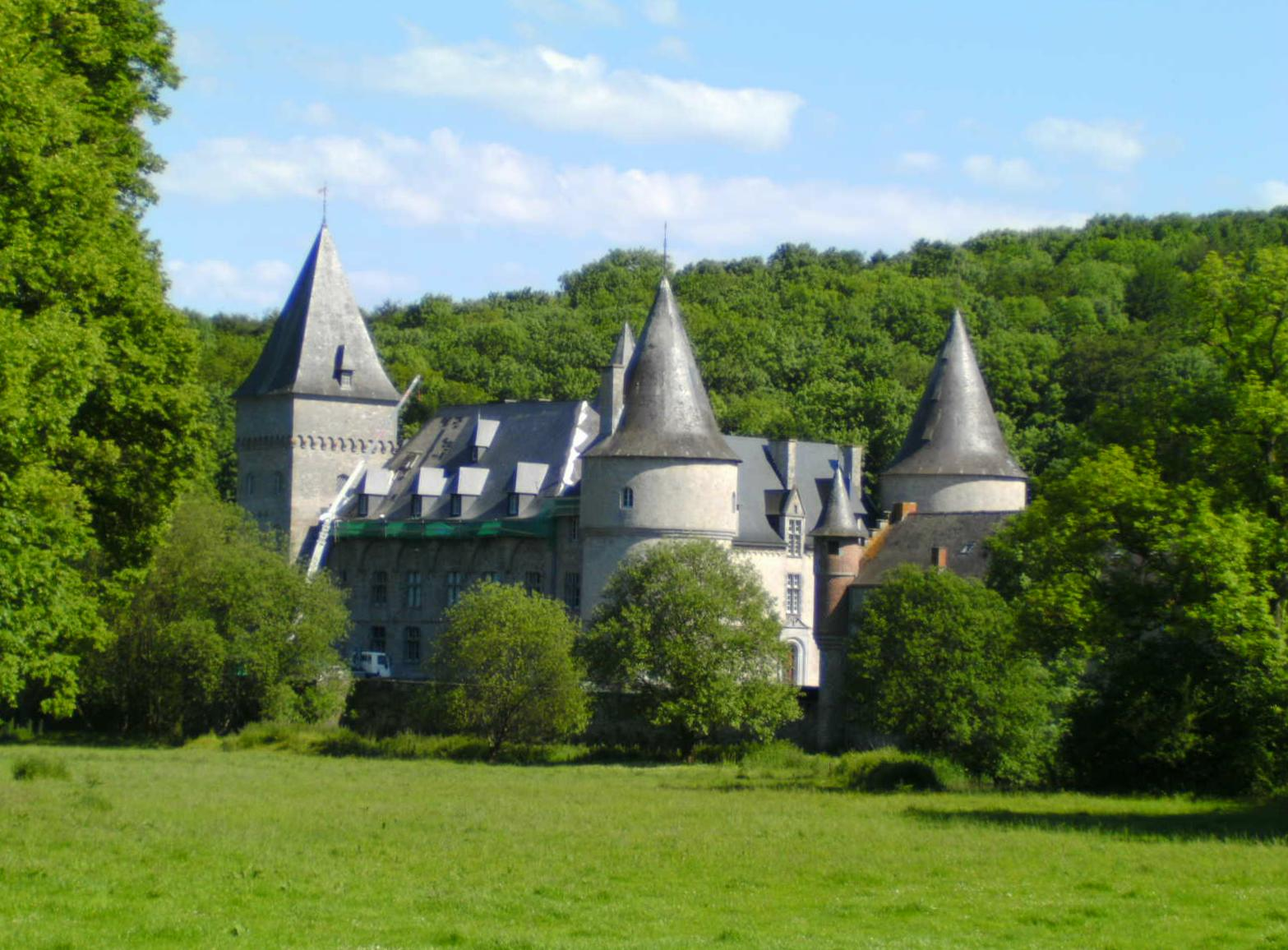

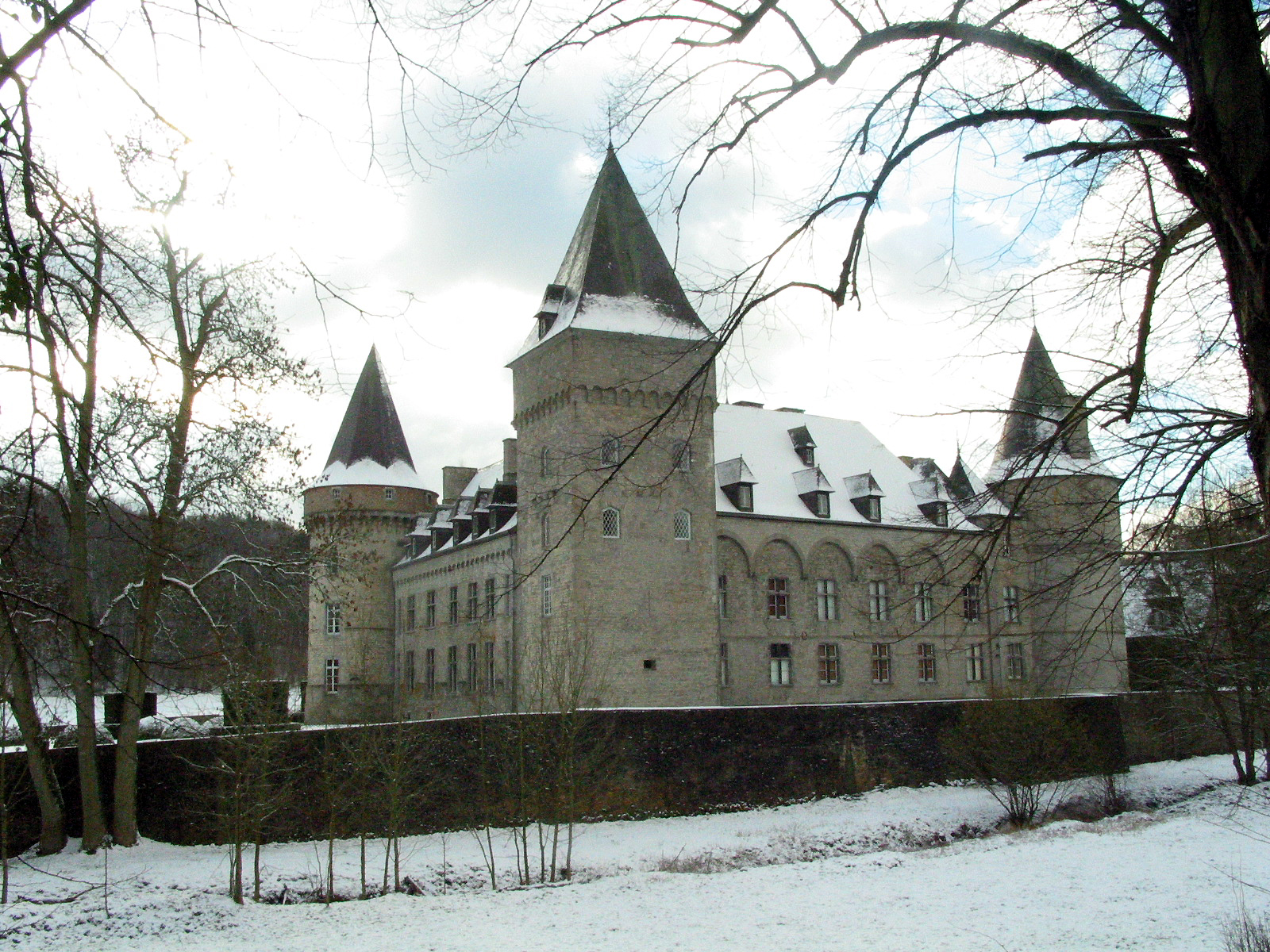
