= Montaigle Castle =

Ruined 14th-century in Falaën, Wallonia, Belgium

Coordinates: 50.293°N 4.815°E

- Wallonia, Belgium
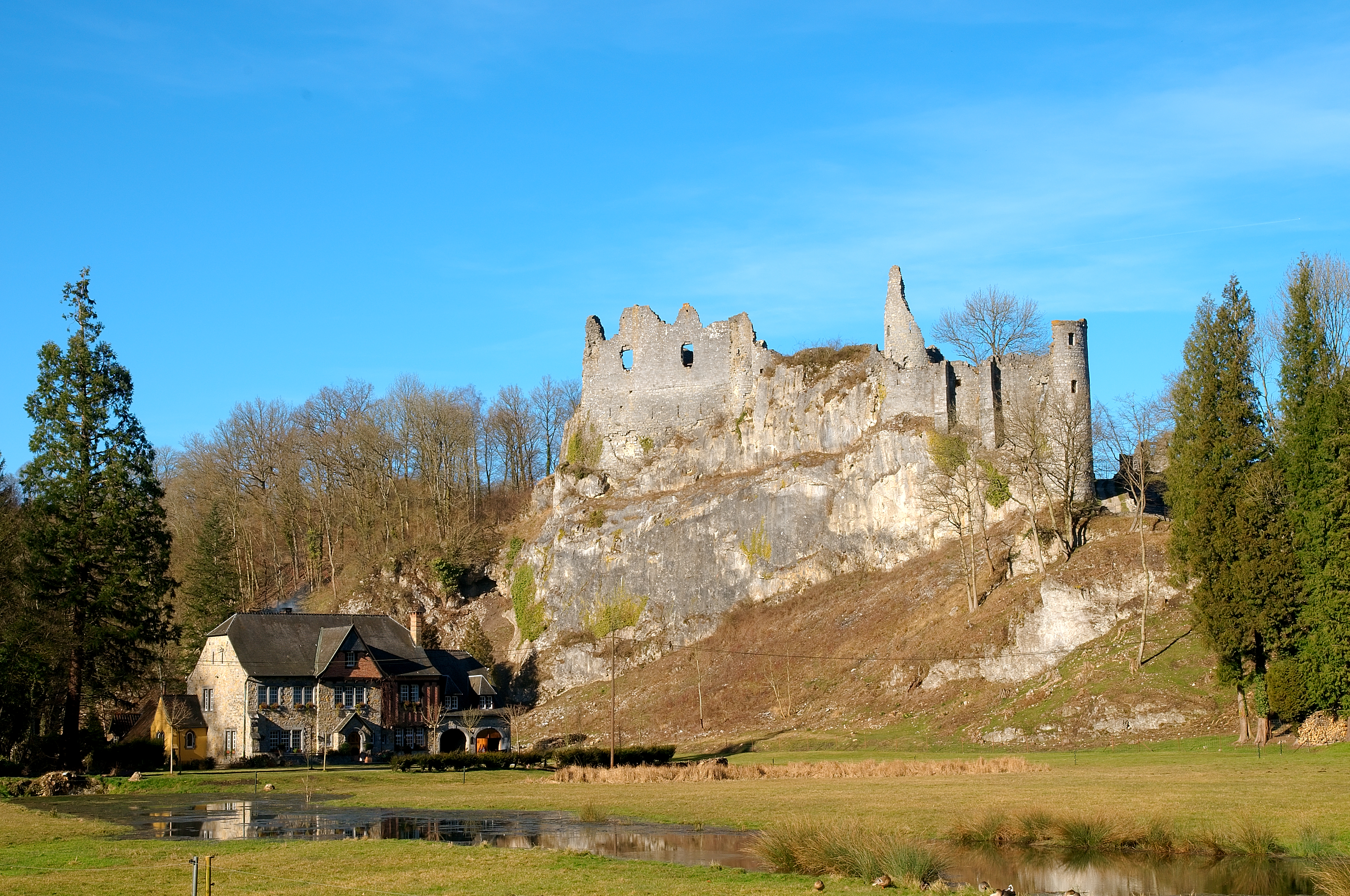

Site information
- Type: Castle

Montaigle Castle (French: Château de Montaigle) is a ruined medieval castle in Falaën in the municipality of Onhaye, province of Namur, Wallonia.

It was built in the 14th century, and destroyed by Henry II of France in 1554. It stands on a rocky spur overlooking the valleys of the Molignée and of the Flavion.

The site was used during the Late Roman period for a Belgo-Roman fortification.

== Montaiglian, the first name of Aurignacian ==
Following the official web-site of Onhaye, The Belgian government commissioned in 1867 the geologist Édouard Dupont to study the caves (locally called trous, lit., "holes") located in the rocky spur of Montaigle. He named each of them after the trees growing near the cave's entrance; Trou du Sureau (Elder), Trou du Chêne (Oak), Trou de l'Erable (Maple), except the lowest one, named Trou Philippe after the name of the hermit who lived therein. Prehistoric remains were found in all of these caves; Dupont described the Cro-Magnon civilization years before the French paleontologists, but the French nomenclature was adopted, though. The "Montaiglian" layer was later renamed "Aurignacian", after the cave of Aurignac in the Pyrénées. This opinion is also indirectly in a book of Marcel Otte Hawthorne Harris Wilder wrote yet in 1924 Montaiglian (or Augniracian)

== See also ==
- List of castles in Belgium
