= Yvoir =

Municipality in Wallonia, Belgium

Yvoir Uwar (Walloon)
- Municipality
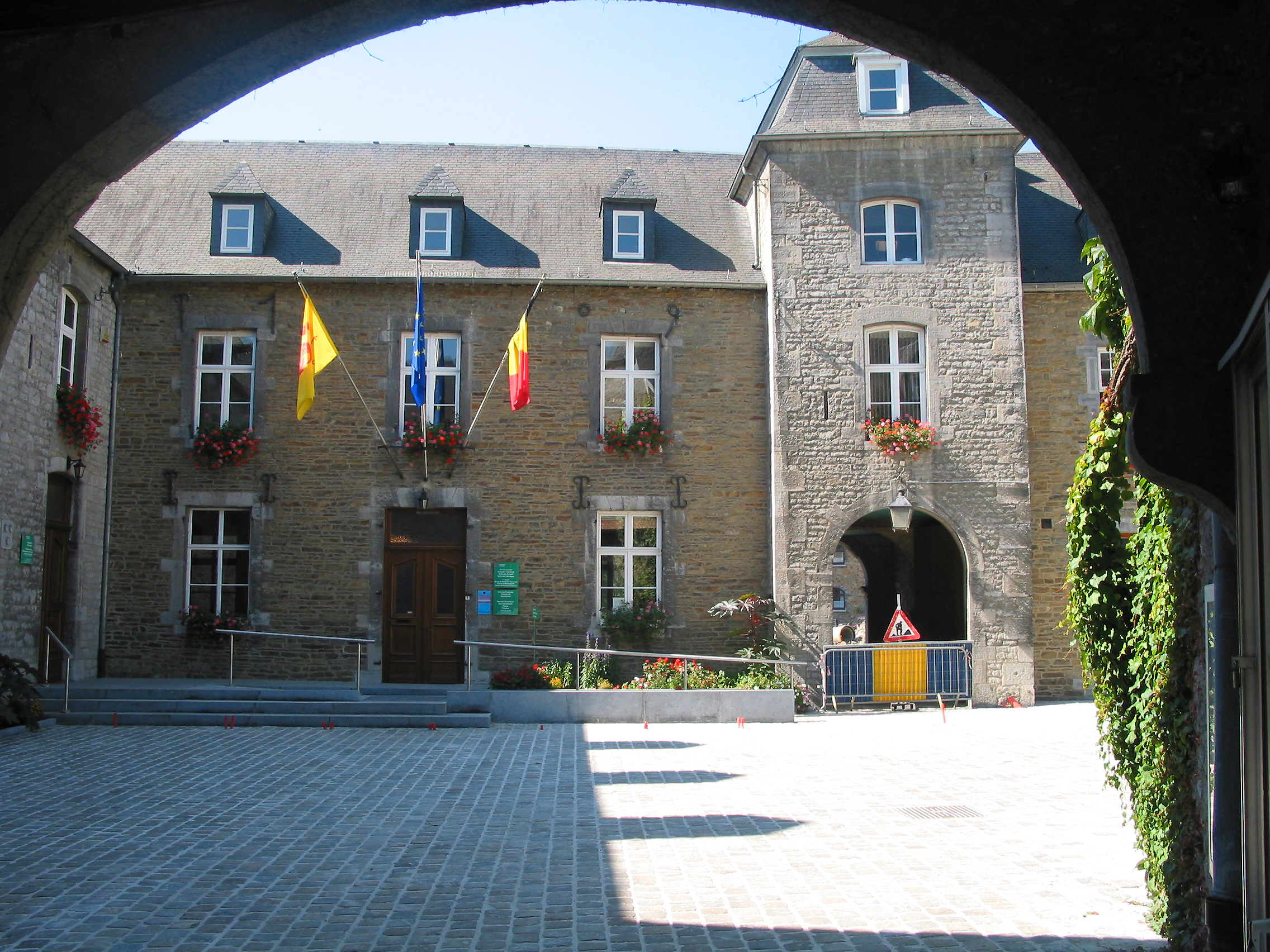

- Flag Coat of arms

- Location of Yvoir in Namur province
- Interactive map of Yvoir
- Location in Belgium
- Coordinates: 50°20′N 04°53′E
- Country: Belgium
- Community: French Community
- Region: Wallonia
- Province: Namur
- Arrondissement: Dinant

Government
  - Mayor: Patrick Evrard
  - Governing party: La Relève - Liste du Bourgmestre

Area
  - Total: 57.11 km^{2} (22.05 sq mi)

Population (2018-01-01)
  - Total: 9,163
  - Density: 160.4/km^{2} (415.6/sq mi)
- Postal codes: 5530
- NIS code: 91141
- Area codes: 082
- Website: www.yvoir.be

Yvoir (French pronunciation: [i.vwaʁ]; Walloon: Uwar) is a municipality of Wallonia located in the province of Namur, Belgium.

On 1 January 2006 the municipality had 8,450 inhabitants. The total area is 56.84 km^{2}, making it a population density of 148.66 inhabitants per km^{2}.

The municipality consists of the following districts: Dorinne, Durnal, Evrehailles, Godinne, Houx, Mont, Purnode, Spontin and Yvoir.

== Sport ==
Yvoir was the host city of the 1975 UCI Road World Championships.

== Healthcare ==
Yvoir hosts the Mont-Godinne site of the CHU UCLouvain Namur university hospital, serving as teaching hospital for the University of Louvain.

== See also ==
- List of protected heritage sites in Yvoir
