= Useldange Castle =

Medieval castle in Luxembourg

Coordinates: 49°46.095′N 5°58.818′E

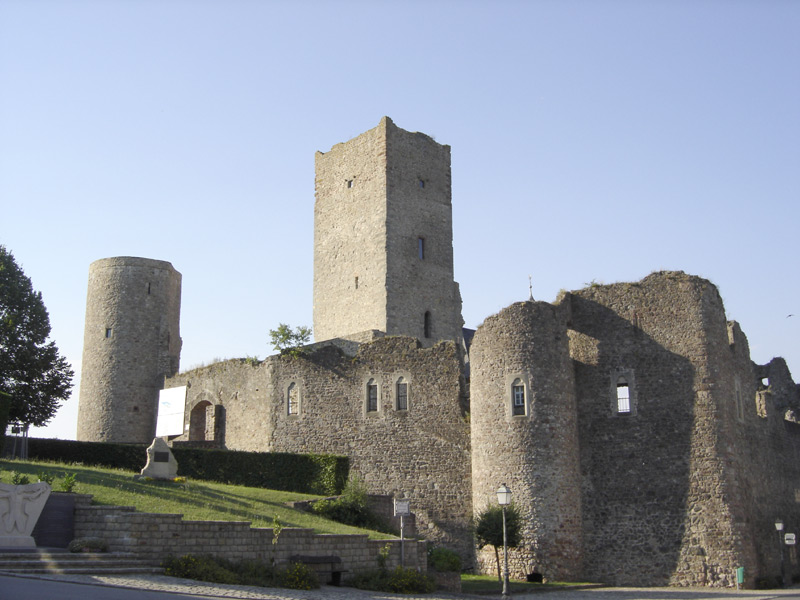
Useldange Castle

Useldange Castle (Luxembourgish: Buerg Useldeng; French: Château d'Useldange; German: Burg Useldingen) is a medieval castle, now mainly in ruin, located in the village of Useldange in western Luxembourg. The site can be visited throughout the year with special arrangements for poorly sighted visitors.

== Location ==
The castle stands on a small hill in the centre of the village overlooking the River Attert. The ruins present a reasonable picture of the medieval castle, especially the outer wall and one of the round towers. A bridge over the former moat, 10 m (33 ft) wide, provides access to the castle. The keep, 25 m (82 ft) tall, stands at the centre of the site.

== History ==
The castle appears to date from the 12th century when the lordship of Useldange was created. One of the early lords was Théobald d'Useldange. After the dynasty died out in the middle of the 13th century, Jean de Rodemacher became the legitimate proprietor in 1415 by marriage with Irmgard de Boulay. In 1479, Maximilian I confiscated the property and charged Christopher of Baden with its upkeep. As a result of the war between France and Burgundy, the castle and its chapel were seriously damaged. William of Nassau-Vianden, who inherited the castle, sold it to François-Sébastien Baur of Everlange in 1674. The castle fell increasingly into disrepair and the chapel was destroyed in 1903.

In 1924, American immigrant Mrs. Emma (Wolff) Kuhn, originally from Useldange, returned to buy the ruined castle. After consolidating the walls in 1934, the family went on to build a modern property over the ruins of the castle's palace. It has now become the town hall. The castle is being restored by the State of Luxembourg.

== The castle today ==
The castle is open to visitors throughout the year. Special arrangements have been made to allow handicapped and weakly sighted visitors to experience the site.
