= Les Plus Beaux Villages de Wallonie =

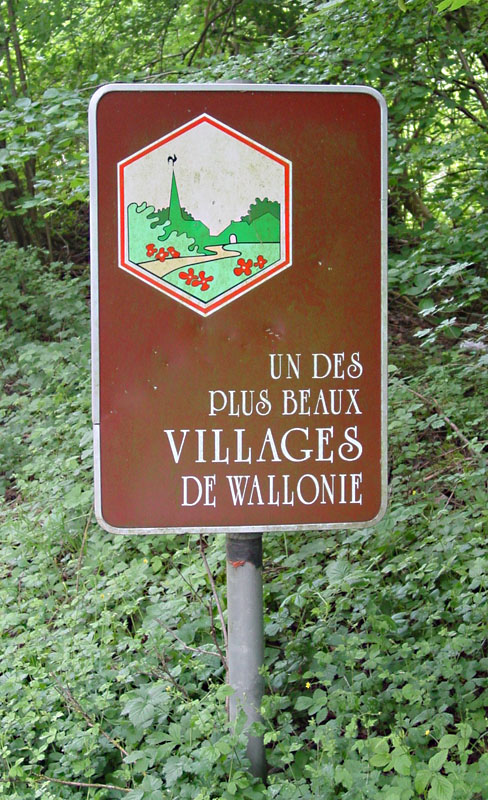
Sign outside Thon-Samson describing it as "One of the Most Beautiful Villages of Wallonia"

Les Plus Beaux Villages de Wallonie (French pronunciation: [le ply bo vilaʒ də walɔni], lit. 'The Most Beautiful Villages of Wallonia') is a non-profit organisation formed in 1994 to promote, protect and develop a number of villages in Wallonia, Belgium.

The association is inspired by the organisation Les plus beaux villages de France and is established as an ASBL in Belgium. It is affiliated to the international association The Most Beautiful Villages in the World.

Les Plus Beaux Villages de Wallonie organises events such as Un Dimanche, un Beau Village ("one Sunday, one beautiful village"), where one village is highlighted and promoted each week, and activities take place to allow visitors to explore the culture and heritage of the village.

== List of villages ==
The following villages are presently members of Les Plus Beaux Villages de Wallonie:

Name	Province	Municipality	Location	Image
Aubechies	Hainaut	Belœil	50°34′26″N 03°40′37″E	(More images)
Barbençon	Hainaut	Beaumont	50°13′14″N 04°17′09″E	(More images)
Celles	Namur	Houyet	50°13′45″N 05°00′29″E	(More images)
Chardeneux	Namur	Somme-Leuze	50°22′26″N 05°21′50″E	(More images)
Chassepierre	Luxembourg	Florenville	49°42′25″N 05°15′39″E	(More images)
Clermont-sur-Berwinne	Liège	Thimister-Clermont	50°39′32″N 05°53′06″E	(More images)
Crupet	Namur	Assesse	50°20′56″N 04°57′36″E	(More images)
Falaën	Namur	Onhaye	50°16′43″N 04°47′36″E	(More images)
Gros-Fays	Namur	Bièvre	49°52′12″N 04°59′02″E	(More images)
Laforêt	Namur	Vresse-sur-Semois	49°53′16″N 04°56′38″E	(More images)
Limbourg	Liège	Limbourg	50°36′43″N 05°56′24″E	(More images)
Lompret	Hainaut	Chimay	50°03′51″N 04°22′44″E	(More images)
Mélin	Walloon Brabant	Jodoigne	50°44′27″N 04°49′48″E	(More images)
Mirwart	Luxembourg	Saint-Hubert	50°03′25″N 05°15′46″E	(More images)
Montignies-sur-Roc	Hainaut	Honnelles	50°22′04″N 03°43′59″E	(More images)
Mozet	Namur	Gesves	50°26′31″N 04°59′09″E	(More images)
Nobressart	Luxembourg	Attert	49°44′24″N 05°43′08″E	(More images)
Ny	Luxembourg	Hotton	50°17′06″N 05°28′52″E	(More images)
Our	Luxembourg	Paliseul	49°57′32″N 05°07′26″E	(More images)
Olne	Liège	Olne	50°34′48″N 05°45′00″E	(More images)
Ragnies	Hainaut	Thuin	50°18′30″N 04°17′02″E	(More images)
Sohier	Luxembourg	Wellin	50°04′04″N 05°04′15″E	(More images)
Soiron	Liège	Pepinster	50°35′31″N 05°47′27″E	(More images)
Sosoye	Namur	Anhée	50°17′45″N 04°46′58″E	(More images)
Soulme	Namur	Doische	50°11′20″N 04°44′09″E	(More images)
Thon-Samson	Namur	Andenne	50°27′58″N 05°00′43″E	(More images)
Torgny	Luxembourg	Rouvroy	49°30′25″N 05°28′33″E	(More images)
Vierves-sur-Viroin	Namur	Viroinval	50°04′51″N 04°38′02″E	(More images)
Wéris	Luxembourg	Durbuy	50°19′33″N 05°31′53″E	(More images)

== See also ==
- Les Plus Beaux Villages de France
- I Borghi più belli d'Italia
- Association des plus beaux villages du Québec
