= Attert (river) =

River in Belgium and Luxembourg

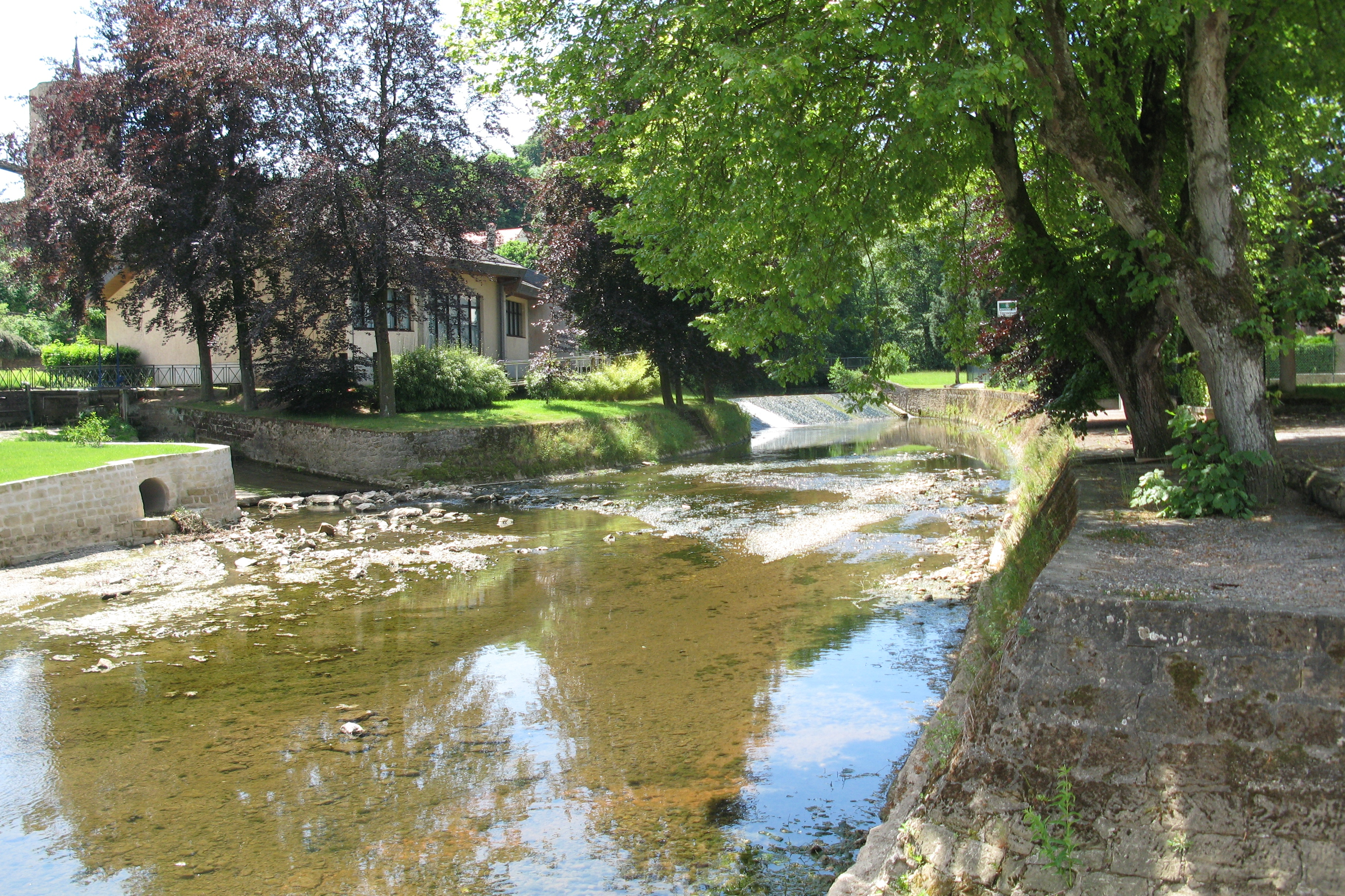
- The Attert in Useldange

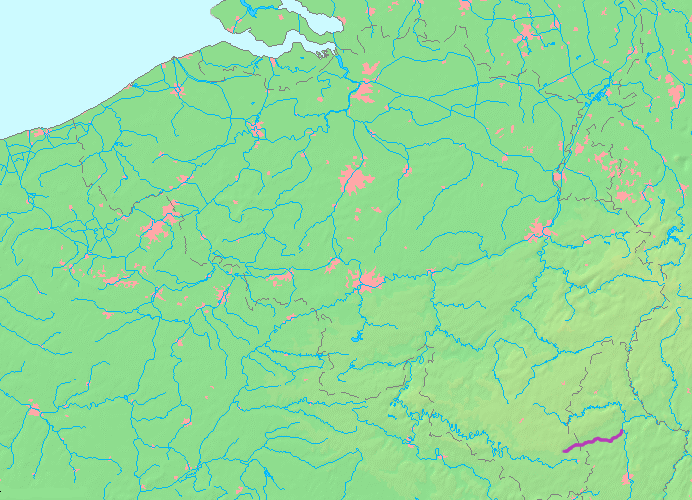

Location
- Country: Belgium, Luxembourg

Physical characteristics
- Source
  - location: Thiaumont, Attert
  - elevation: 406 m (1,332 ft)
- Mouth
  - location: Colmar-Berg
  - coordinates: 49°48′54″N 6°05′46″E
- Length: 38 km (24 mi)
- Basin size: 290 km^{2} (110 sq mi)

Basin features
- Progression: Alzette→ Sauer→ Moselle→ Rhine→ North Sea

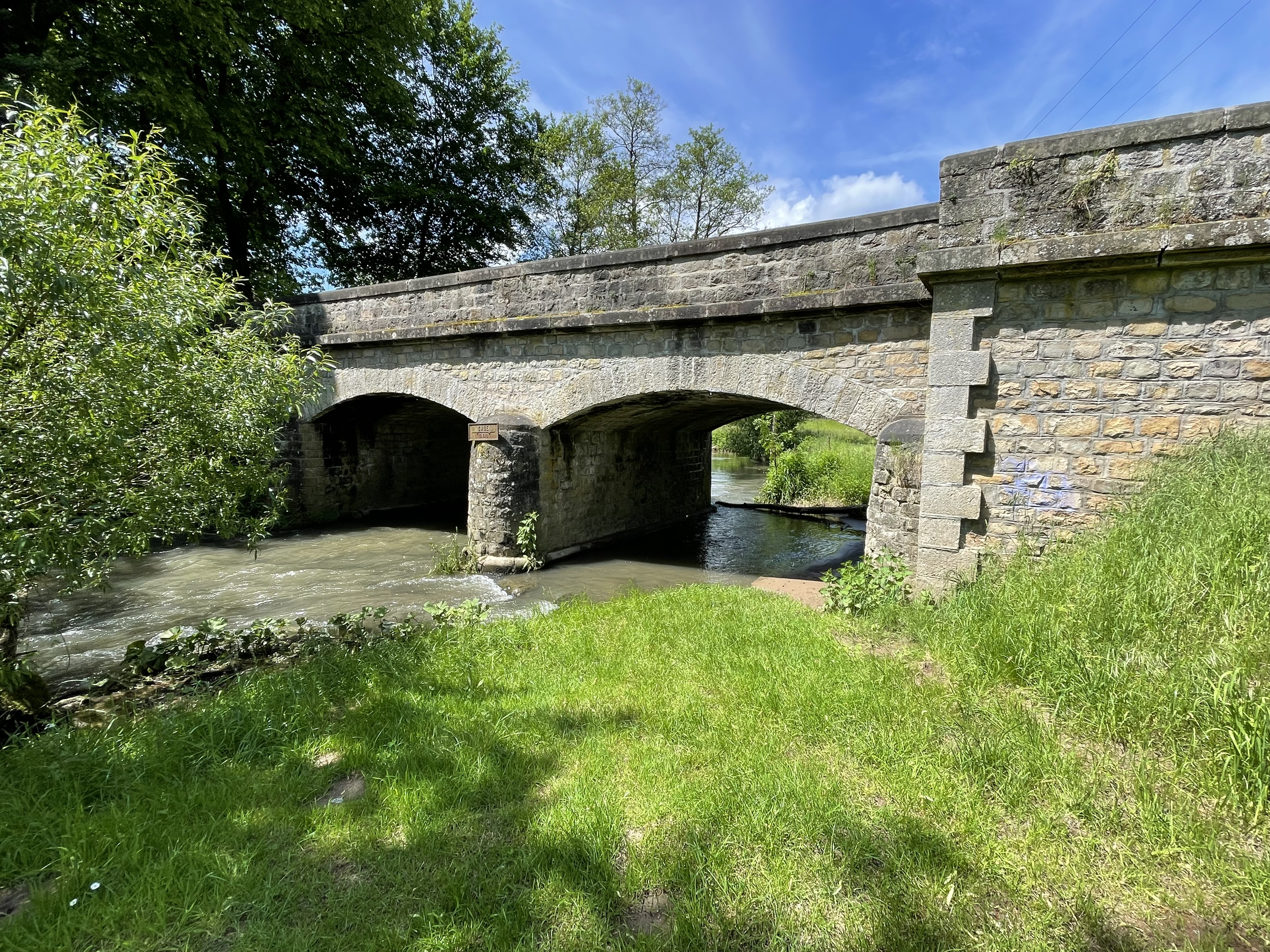
River Attert at Redange-sur-Attert in Luxembourg

The Attert (French pronunciation: [atɛʁt], German pronunciation: [ˈatɐt]; Luxembourgish: Atert) is a river in western Europe that flows through Belgium and Luxembourg. Approximately 38 kilometres (24 mi) long, it rises near Nobressart in Belgium, crosses the Luxembourg border, and ultimately joins the river Alzette at Colmar-Berg. The Attert basin covers around 290 square kilometres (110 sq mi) and features diverse landscapes influenced by regional geology, resulting in seasonal variations in water flow and sediment transport. Since 2001, Belgium and Luxembourg have jointly managed the river through ecological initiatives aimed at preserving water quality, protecting habitats, and supporting aquatic wildlife.

== Geology ==
The Attert is 38 kilometres (24 mi), of which 32 kilometres (20 mi) are in Luxembourg and 6 kilometres (4 mi) in Belgium. Its source is in Nobressart, north-west of Arlon, in the Belgian province Luxembourg. It flows into the river Alzette at Colmar-Berg. It flows through the village of Attert in Belgium, and the towns of Redange, Everlange, Useldange, Boevange-sur-Attert, and Bissen in Luxembourg.

== Hydrology and climate ==
The Attert River has a pluvial oceanic hydrological regime, characterized by seasonal flow variations. Low flows typically occur from July to September due to high summer evapotranspiration, while high flows are observed from December to February when evapotranspiration is at its lowest. The catchment receives an average annual precipitation of 845 millimetres (33.3 in) (based on 1971–2000 data), with relatively consistent monthly rainfall distribution throughout the year. Temperature patterns show seasonal variation, with mean monthly temperatures ranging from approximately 0 °C (32 °F) in January to 18 °C (64 °F) in July. The region typically experiences below-freezing temperatures (below 0 °C (32 °F)) for about 80 days annually.

The Attert River basin encompasses an area of approximately 290.1 square kilometres (112.0 sq mi) (measured to its confluence at Bissen) in northwestern Luxembourg. The catchment is characterized by diverse geological formations, which influence local hydrology and land use patterns. The western portions of the basin feature predominantly schist bedrock, while areas to the east contain Luxembourg Sandstone and Keuper sandy marl formations.

The Attert catchment has been the subject of detailed hydrological and environmental research, particularly regarding sediment transport processes. Studies have examined how various land use types within the basin contribute to suspended sediment loads in the river system. This research provides insights into erosion patterns, sediment sources, and environmental dynamics within the watershed.

Land use within the Attert basin varies with the underlying geology and topography. Forested areas predominate on the steeper slopes and schist formations, while grasslands and cultivated areas are more common in gentler terrain and on different soil types. This diverse landscape pattern influences runoff characteristics and sediment dynamics throughout the catchment.

=== Hydrological management ===
Since 2001, the Attert River has been managed through a coordinated cross-border initiative known as the Attert River Contract (Contrat rivière Attert-Kontrakt). This partnership between Belgium and Luxembourg promotes sustainable management practices that aim to improve water quality, restore riverbanks, and enhance biodiversity. Specific actions include revegetating eroded banks, fencing sections of the river to prevent livestock access, and installing fish passages at physical barriers such as Schadeck and Luxeroth to support the free movement of aquatic life. The Attert provides drinking water to local communities, necessitating careful monitoring and management to address contamination concerns, particularly from agricultural nitrates and untreated domestic wastewater.
