= Wéris megaliths =

- Mégalithes du domaine de Wéris
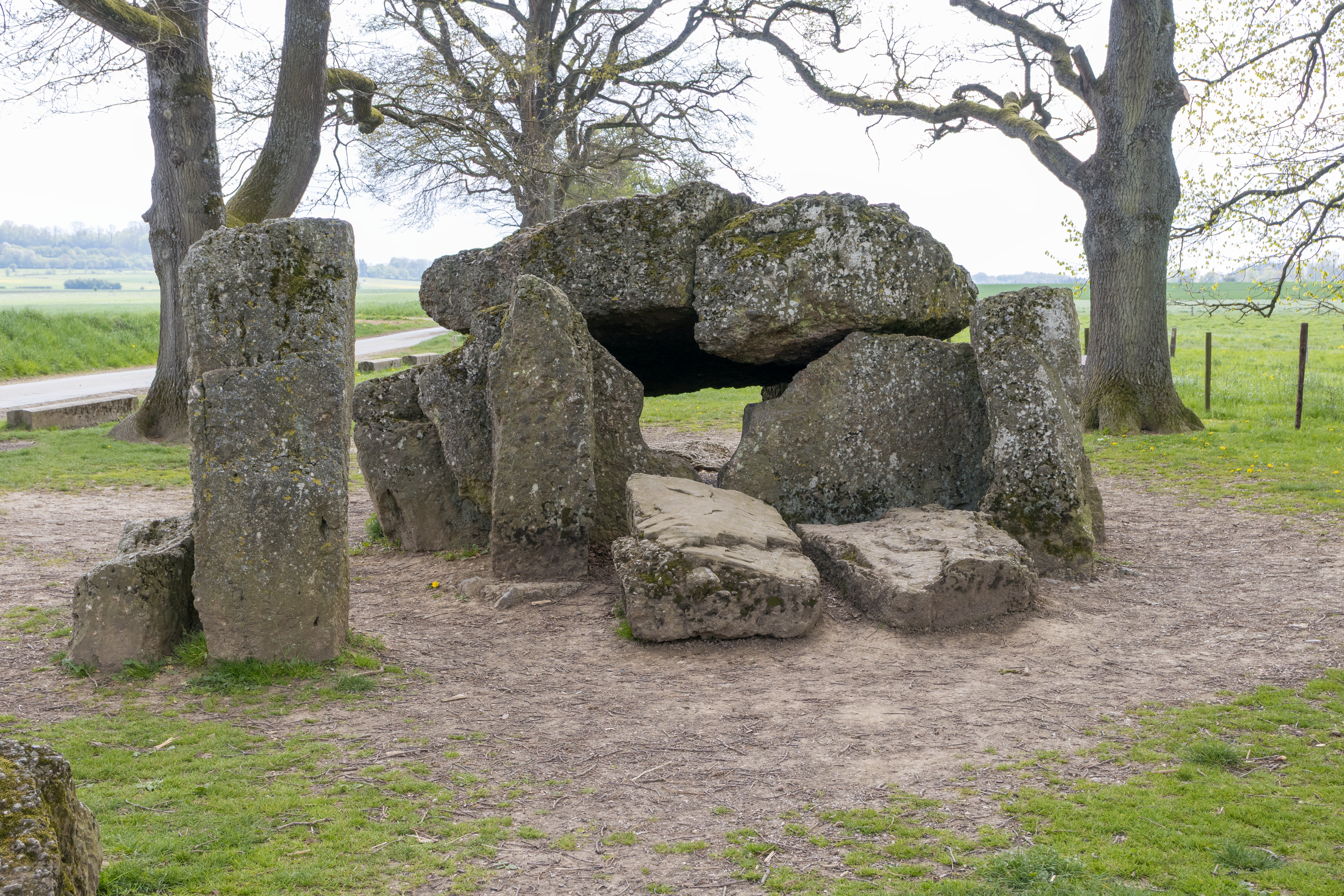
- Wéris I dolmen

- Location within Belgium
- 50.326°N 5.531°E
- Type: Dolmens / menhirs
- Periods: Neolithic
- Location: Wéris
- Region: Belgium

The Wéris megaliths are a group of megalithic monuments found near the village of Wéris, in the province of Luxembourg, in Belgium.

== Description ==
The megalithic remains at Wéris are scattered over a region more than 5 miles (8 km) long and form a group which is unique in Belgium. There are many standing stones (menhirs), including one beside the road just southwest of Wéris. Of the many chamber tombs (dolmens) which once existed in the area, two now survive in good condition. These remains generally date to around 3000 BC, a time period which corresponds to that of the Seine-Oise-Marne culture.

The dolmens are made from slabs of conglomerate stone. A notable feature of the two dolmens is that the funerary chamber and the ante-chamber are separated by a stone slab pierced with a circular opening.

- Wéris I (French: Dolmen de Wéris) is situated beside the road just northwest of the village of Wéris. It is the larger of the two dolmens and has a single massive roof slab. This tomb had been robbed prior to excavation, so nothing is known about its contents.
- Wéris II (French: Dolmen d'Oppagne) is to the southwest of Wéris and has a roof composed of three massive horizontal slabs. Excavations of the grave-chamber found the bones from several people, together with flint tools and a few sherds of coarse pottery. Charcoal from a hearth and several animal bones suggested a ritual funeral meal.

A museum (La Maison des Mégalithes de Wéris) for the monuments can be found in the centre of the village of Wéris.

== Gallery ==
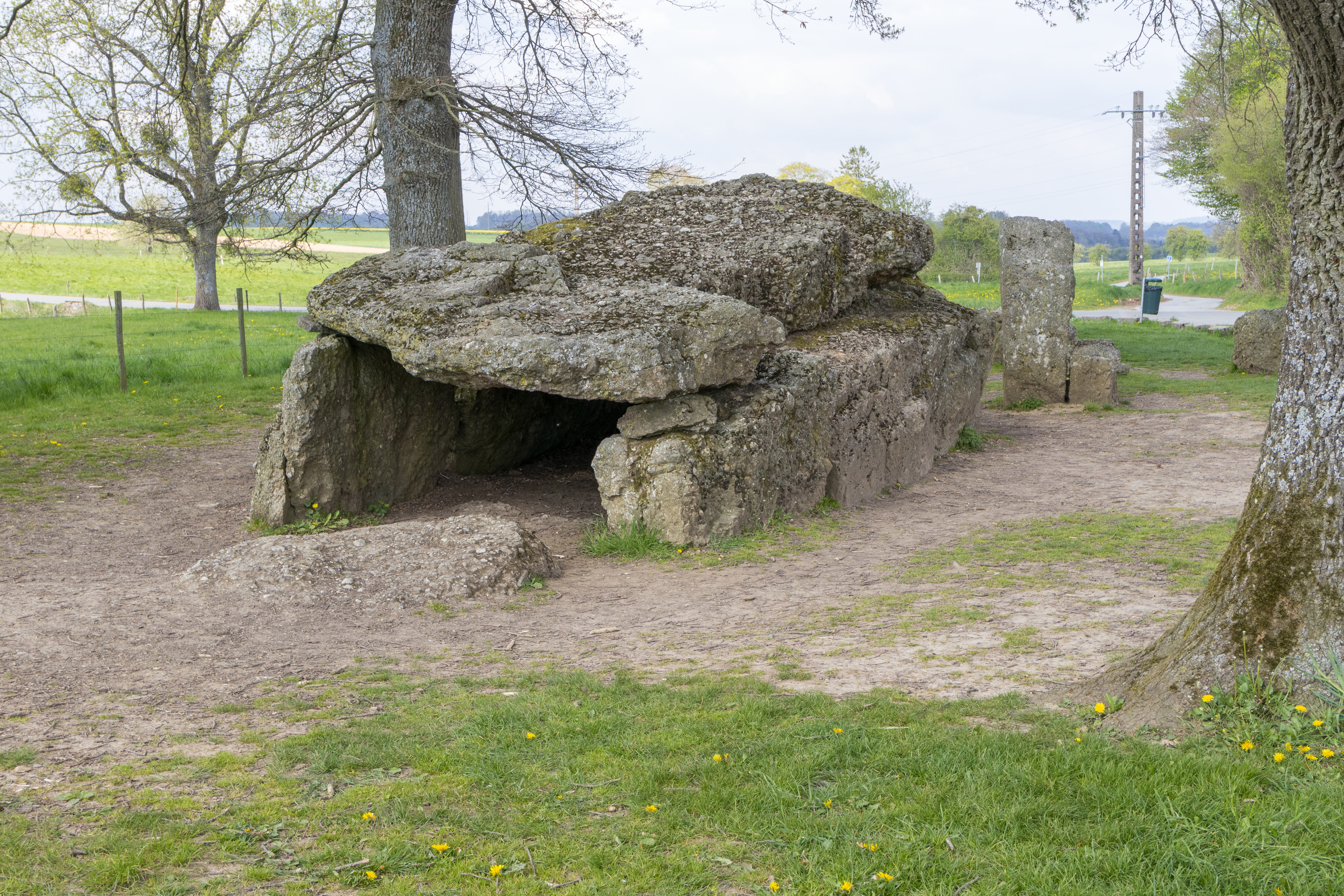
Wéris I

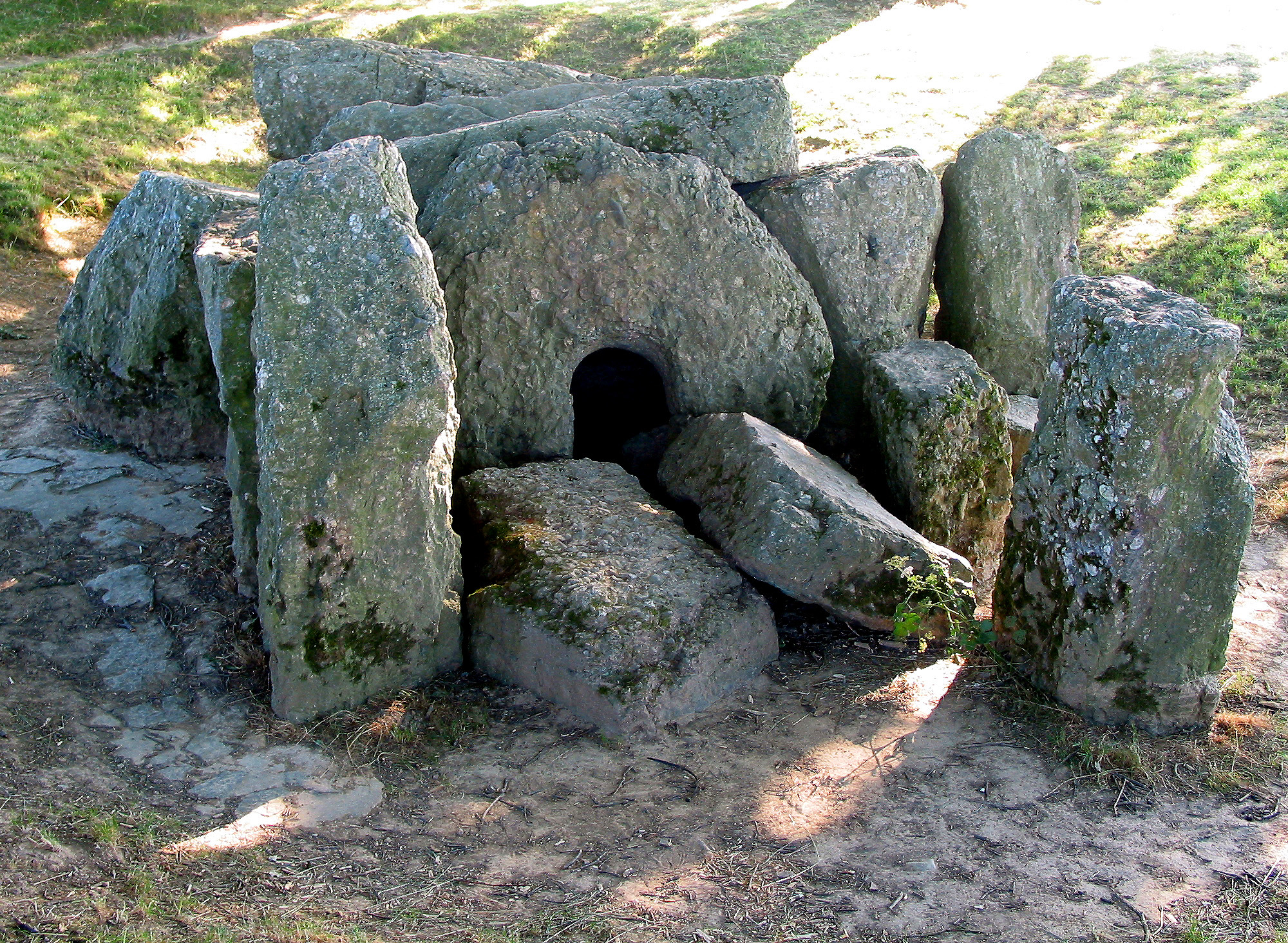
Wéris II

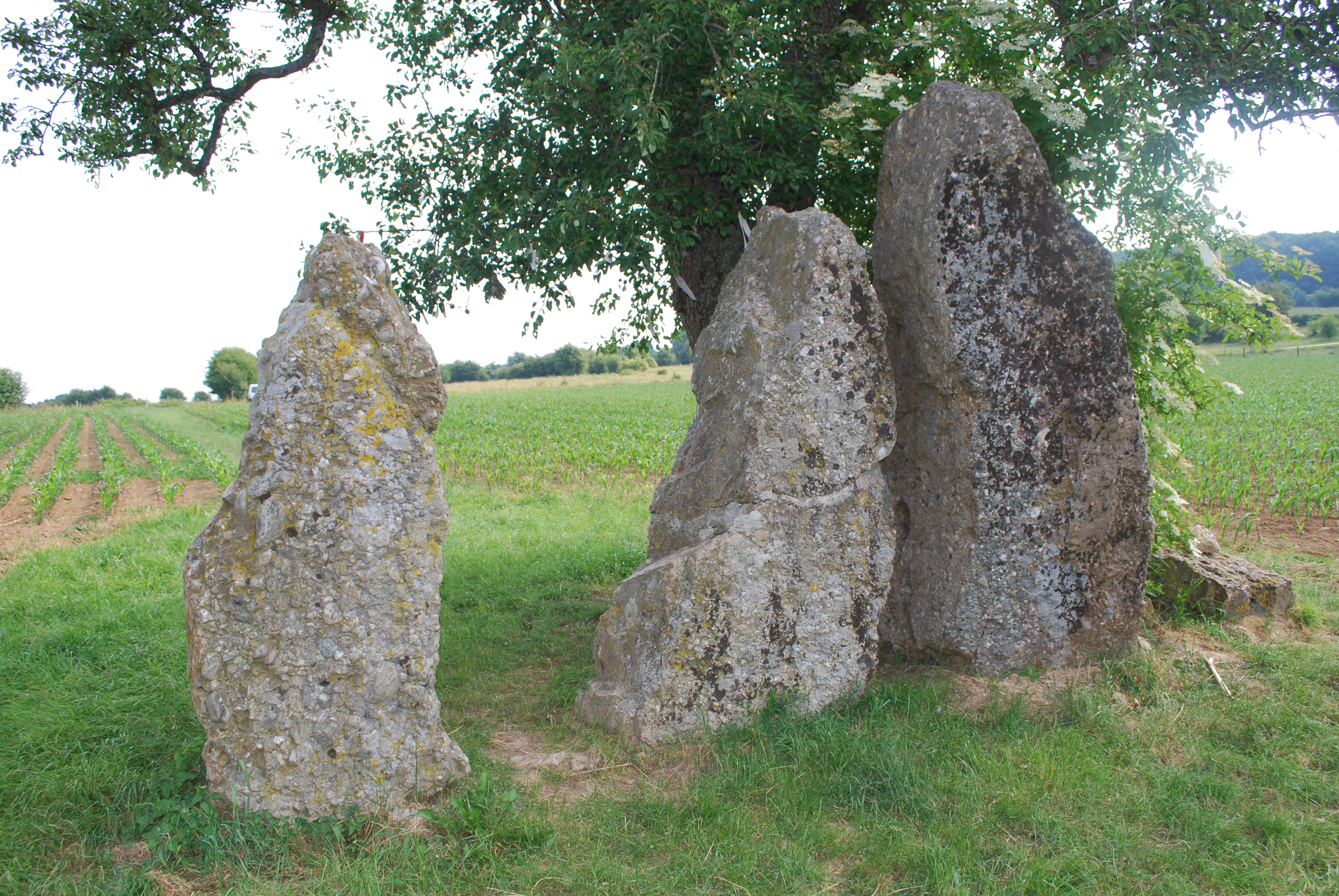
Oppagne Menhirs

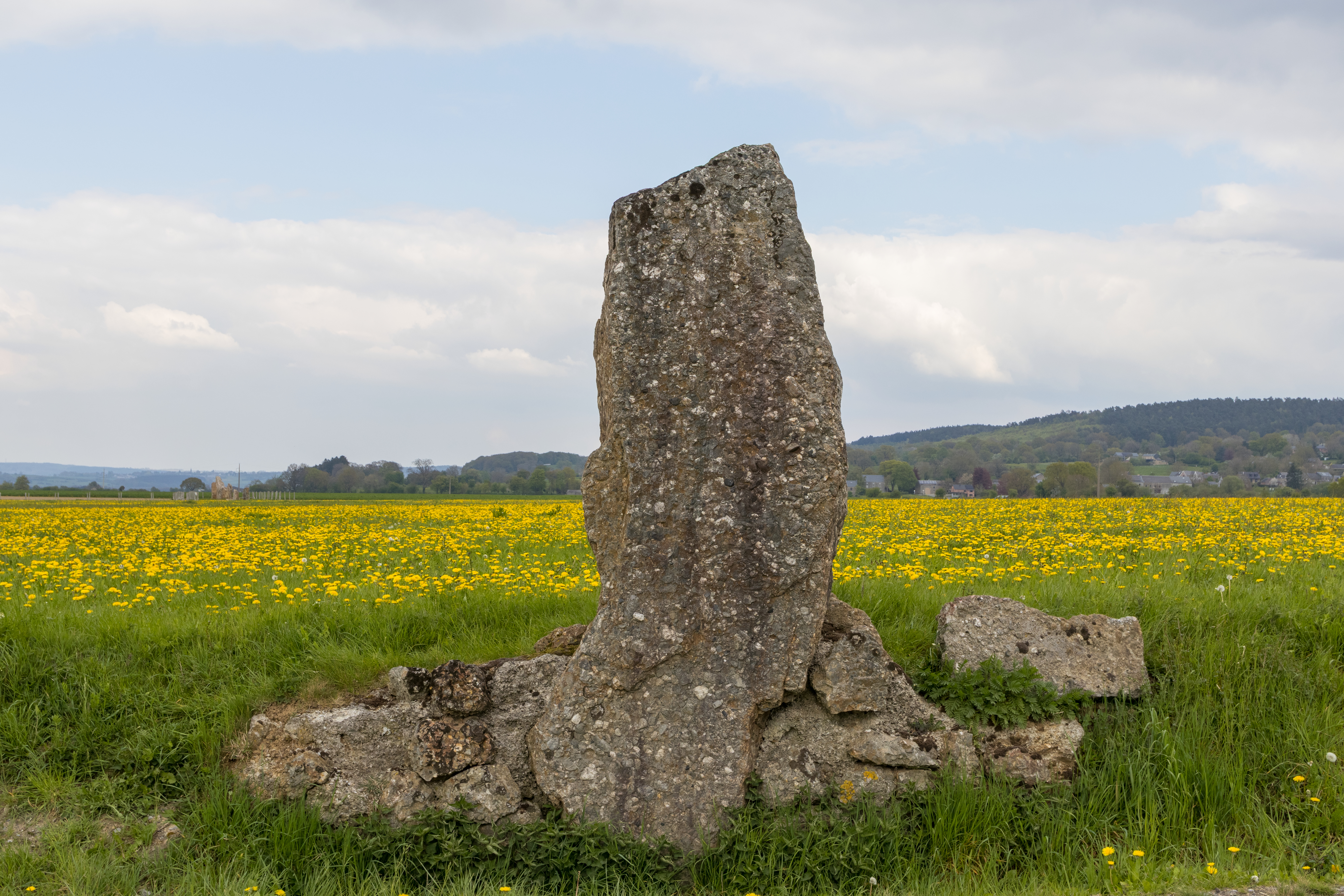
Danthine Menhir

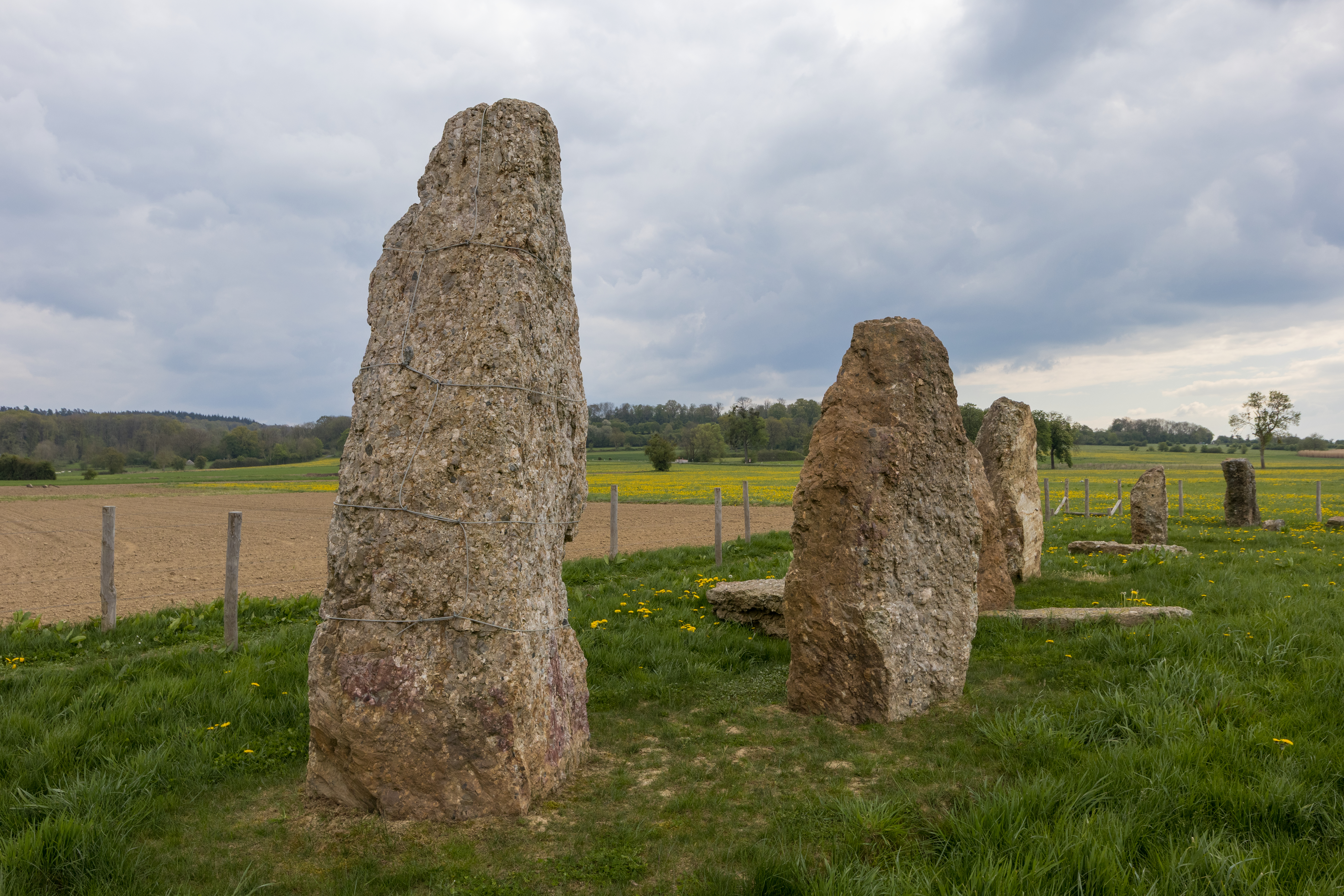
Field of the long stone
