= List of protected heritage sites in Vresse-sur-Semois =

This table shows an overview of the protected heritage sites in the Walloon town Vresse-sur-Semois. This list is part of Belgium's national heritage.

| Object | Year/architect | Town/section | Address | Coordinates | Number^{?} | Image |
|---|---|---|---|---|---|---|
| Pont Saint-Lambert and its immediate surroundings ^{(nl)} ^{(fr)} | | Vresse-sur-Semois | | 49.871530°N 4.932567°E | 91143-CLT-0001-01 Info | Pont Saint-Lambert en directe omgeving |
| Mouzaive Mill ^{(nl)} ^{(fr)} | | Vresse-sur-Semois | Rue de Liboichaut 58-60, Mouzaive | 49.854095°N 4.968358°E | 91143-CLT-0002-01 Info | |
| House Du Marichaux ^{(nl)} ^{(fr)} | | Vresse-sur-Semois | Place Josué Henry de la Lindi 25, Bohan | 49.863742°N 4.885565°E | 91143-CLT-0003-01 Info | Woonhuis Du Marichaux |
| Water basin near center of Sugny ^{(nl)} ^{(fr)} | | Vresse-sur-Semois | Sugny | 49.816218°N 4.903102°E | 91143-CLT-0005-01 Info | |
| Water basin in Sugny ^{(nl)} ^{(fr)} | | Vresse-sur-Semois | Place du Vivier, Sugny | 49.815580°N 4.902134°E | 91143-CLT-0006-01 Info | |
| Water basin ^{(nl)} ^{(fr)} | | Vresse-sur-Semois | Rue du Pont de Claies 18, Laforêt | 49.863116°N 4.931272°E | 91143-CLT-0007-01 Info | |
| Water basin ^{(nl)} ^{(fr)} | | Vresse-sur-Semois | Rue Sainte-Agathe 47, Laforêt | 49.861183°N 4.927667°E | 91143-CLT-0008-01 Info | |
| Semois river bed and banks along both sides of the bridge ^{(nl)} ^{(fr)} | | Vresse-sur-Semois | | 49.847494°N 4.967140°E | 91143-CLT-0009-01 Info | Semois bedding en -oevers langs beide kanten van de brug More images |
| House (façade and roof) ^{(nl)} ^{(fr)} | | Vresse-sur-Semois | Rue de la Paroisse 38, Sugny | 49.815038°N 4.901343°E | 91143-CLT-0010-01 Info | |
| House (façade and roof) ^{(nl)} ^{(fr)} | | Vresse-sur-Semois | Rue du Pont de Claies 22, Laforêt | 49.862520°N 4.930288°E | 91143-CLT-0011-01 Info | |
| House (façade and roof) ^{(nl)} ^{(fr)} | | Vresse-sur-Semois | Rue du Pont de Claies 21, Laforêt | 49.862587°N 4.930355°E | 91143-CLT-0012-01 Info | |

== See also ==
- List of protected heritage sites in Namur (province)
