= Our =

Our or OUR may refer to:

- The possessive form of "we"

== Places ==
- Our (river), in Belgium, Luxembourg, and Germany
- Our, Belgium, a village in Belgium
- Our, Jura, a commune in France

== Other uses ==
- Office of Utilities Regulation (OUR), a government utility regulator in Jamaica
- Operation Underground Railroad, a non-profit organization that helps rescue sex trafficking victims
- Operation Unified Response, the United States military's response to the 2010 Haiti earthquake
- Ownership, Unity and Responsibility Party, a political party in the Solomon Islands

== See also ==
- Ours (disambiguation)
