= Thon-Samson =

Thon-Samson Ton-Sanson (Walloon)
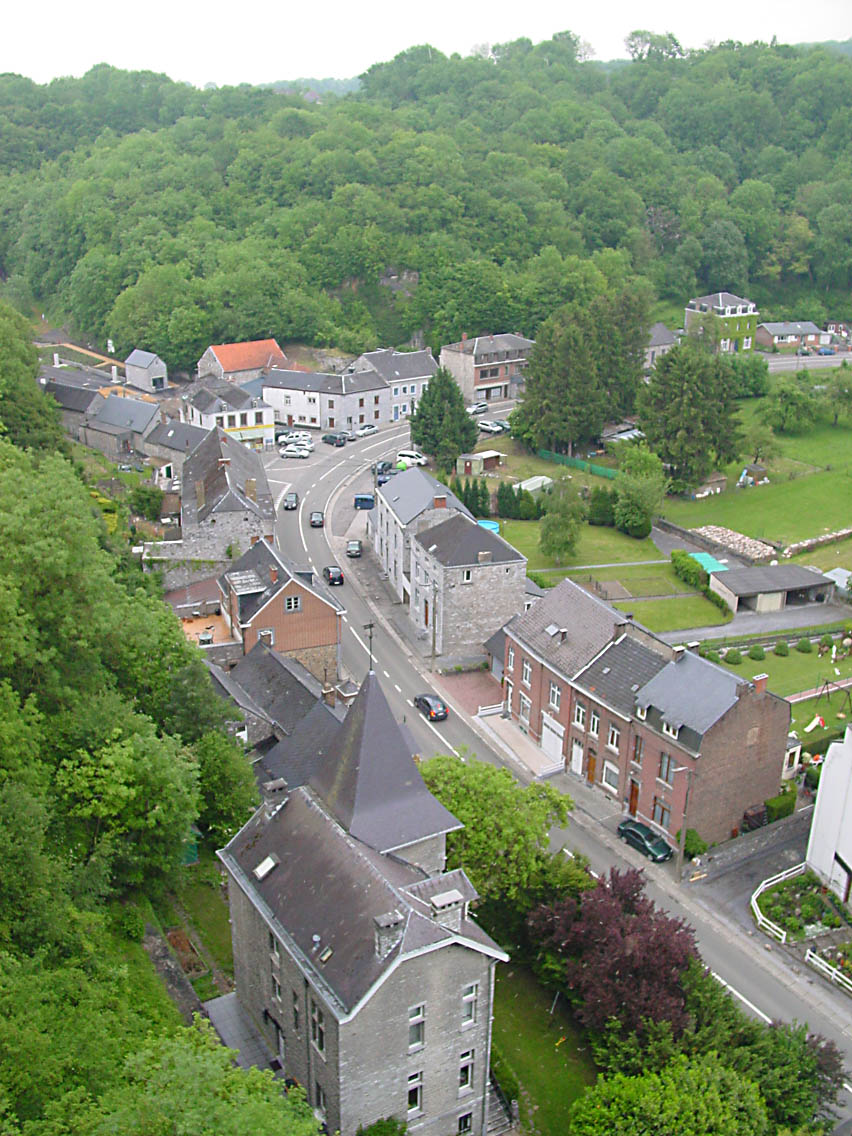

- Location in Belgium
- Coordinates: 50°27′N 05°00′E
- Country: Belgium
- Region: Wallonia
- Province: Namur
- Municipality: Andenne

Thon-Samson (Walloon: Ton-Sanson) is a village of Wallonia and a district of the municipality of Andenne, located in the province of Namur, Belgium.

Thon-Samson is a member of the Les Plus Beaux Villages de Wallonie ("The Most Beautiful Villages of Wallonia") association.
