= Ragnies =

Ragnies Ragniye (Walloon)
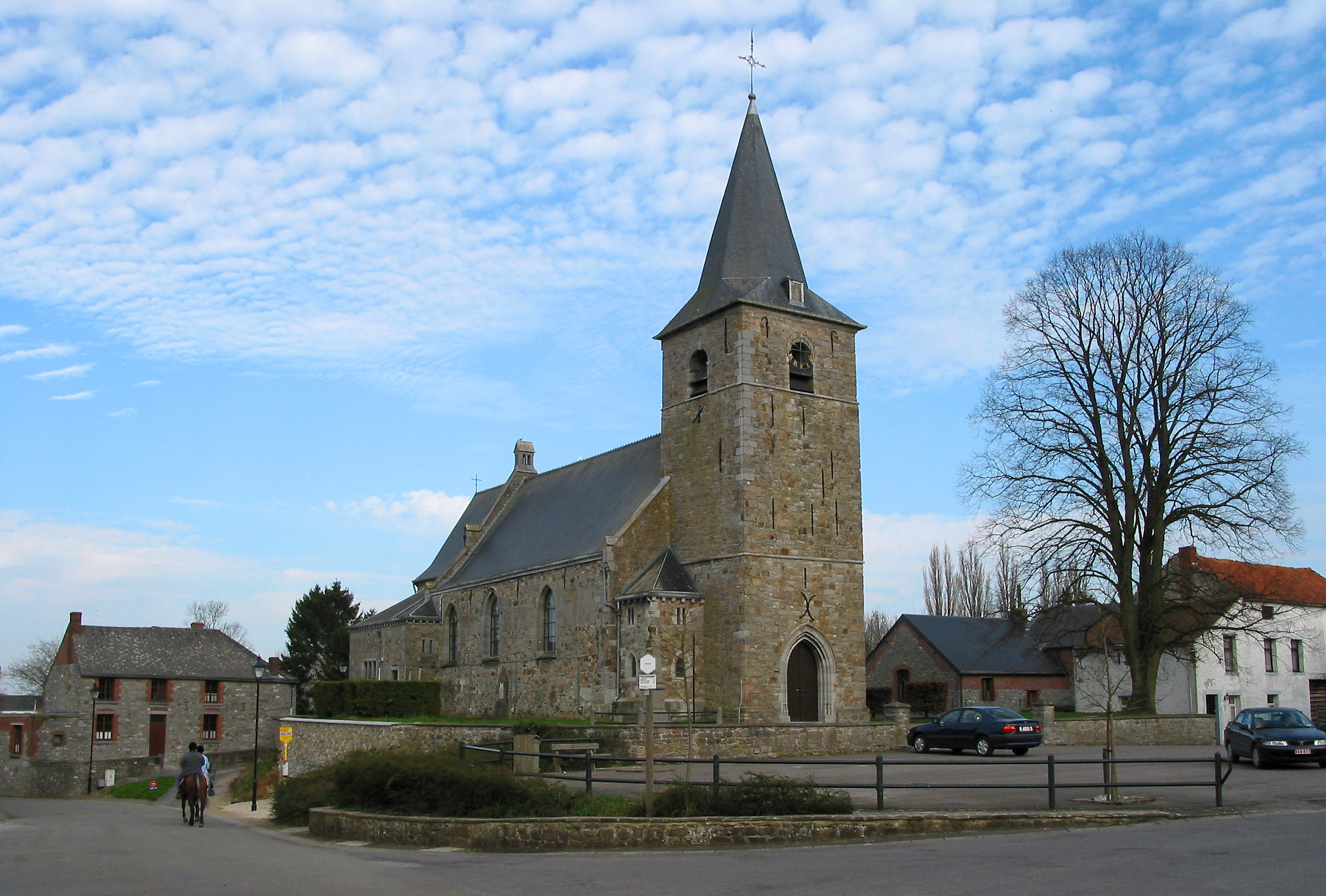

- Location in Belgium
- Coordinates: 50°18′N 04°17′E
- Country: Belgium
- Region: Wallonia
- Province: Hainaut
- Municipality: Thuin

Ragnies (French pronunciation: [ʁaɲi]; Walloon: Ragniye) is a village of Wallonia and a district of the municipality of Thuin, located in the province of Hainaut, Belgium.

Ragnies is a member of the Les Plus Beaux Villages de Wallonie ("The Most Beautiful Villages of Wallonia") association.
