= Rippweiler =

Town in Useldange, Luxembourg

Coordinates: 49°45′N 5°57′E

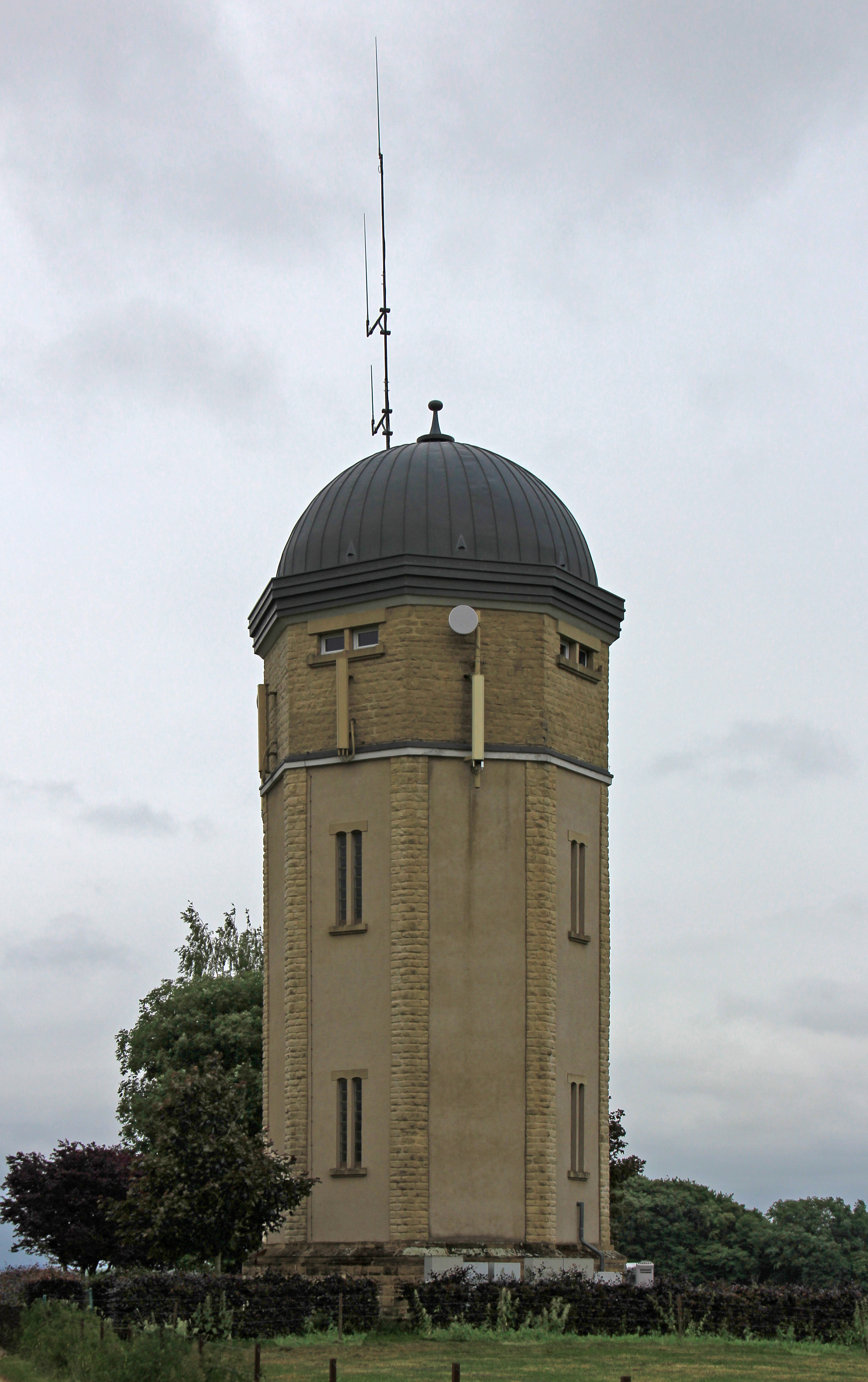
The Rippweiler water tower near the grotto

Rippweiler (German pronunciation: [ˈʁɪpvaɪlɐ]) is a small town in the commune of Useldange, in western Luxembourg. As of September 2026, the town has a population of 190.
