= List of protected heritage sites in Paliseul =

This table shows an overview of the protected heritage sites in the Walloon town Paliseul. This list is part of Belgium's national heritage.

Object	Year/architect	Town/section	Address	Coordinates	Number^{?}	Image
Forest Houmont ^{(nl)} ^{(fr)}		Paliseul		49.958030°N 5.172884°E	84050-CLT-0001-01 Info	
Church of Saint Remacle ^{(nl)} ^{(fr)}		Paliseul		49.934428°N 5.118593°E	84050-CLT-0003-01 Info	
Establishment of conservation around the church Saint-Remacle ^{(nl)} ^{(fr)}		Paliseul		49.934004°N 5.118563°E	84050-CLT-0004-01 Info	
Church of Saint-Laurent: facades and roofs ^{(nl)} ^{(fr)}		Paliseul	Our	49.959692°N 5.123496°E	84050-CLT-0005-01 Info	Kerk Saint-Laurent: gevels en daken More images
Cemetery wall and stairs to the cemetery around the church of Saint-Laurent and the ensemble of the church, the cemetery and lawn located between the wall of the cemetery and roads, including the slope along the rue Porcheresse. Establishment of a protection zone limited to the facades of the buildings in the streets around the church and bridge across the Our. ^{(nl)} ^{(fr)}		Paliseul	Our	49.959586°N 5.123505°E	84050-CLT-0006-01 Info	Kerkhofmuur en de trap naar de begraafplaats rond de kerk van Saint-Laurent en het ensemble van de kerk, de begraafplaats en het grasveld gelegen tussen de muur van de begraafplaats en wegen, waaronder de ruimte in de helling langs de rue Porcheresse. Oprichting van een beschermingszone beperkt tot de gevels van de gebouwen in de straten rond de kerk ende brug over de Our. More images
Chapel of Saint-Roch and the surrounding wall ^{(nl)} ^{(fr)}		Paliseul	rue Saint-Roch	49.904422°N 5.139379°E	84050-CLT-0007-01 Info	Kapel Saint-Roch en de omliggende muur More images
Marie-Thérèse bridge west of the mill of Wes-el-Vaux and the ensemble of the bridge and its surroundings ^{(nl)} ^{(fr)}		Paliseul		49.973953°N 5.188851°E	84050-CLT-0008-01 Info	Brug Marie-Thérèse ten westen van de molen van Wes-el-Vaux en het ensemble van de brug en zijn omgeving More images
Bridge of Justice "Pont Vieux" and the ensemble of the bridge and its surroundings ^{(nl)} ^{(fr)}		Paliseul		49.966404°N 5.193831°E	84050-CLT-0009-01 Info	Brug de la Justice "Vieux Pont" en het ensemble van de brug en zijn omgeving More images
Beth bridge across the Our River and the ensemble of the bridge and its surroundings ^{(nl)} ^{(fr)}		Paliseul	Beth	49.943669°N 5.122906°E	84050-CLT-0010-01 Info	

== See also ==
- List of protected heritage sites in Luxembourg (Belgium)
