= Nobressart =

Village in Wallonia, Belgium

Coordinates: 49°44.4′N 5°43.15′E

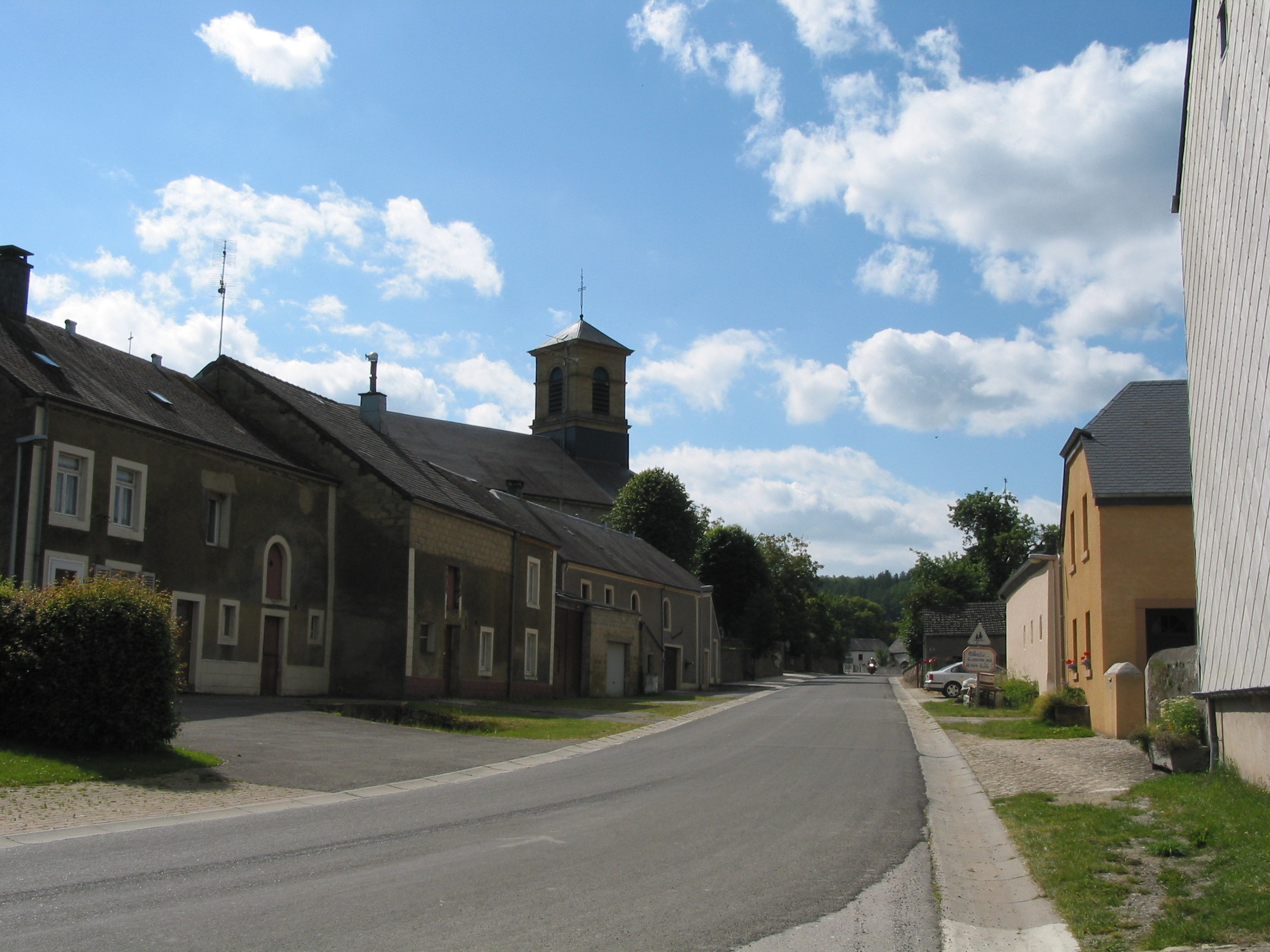
Nobressart

Nobressart (Walloon: Nåbrissåt; Luxembourgish: Elchert/Gehaanselchert; German: Elchenroth) is a village of Wallonia and a district of the municipality of Attert, located in the province of Luxembourg, Belgium.

Nearby is the source of the Attert River.

The village is a member of the organisation Les Plus Beaux Villages de Wallonie.

Nobressart's webpage.
