= Mélin =

Mélin Mélin-el-Hesbaye (Walloon)
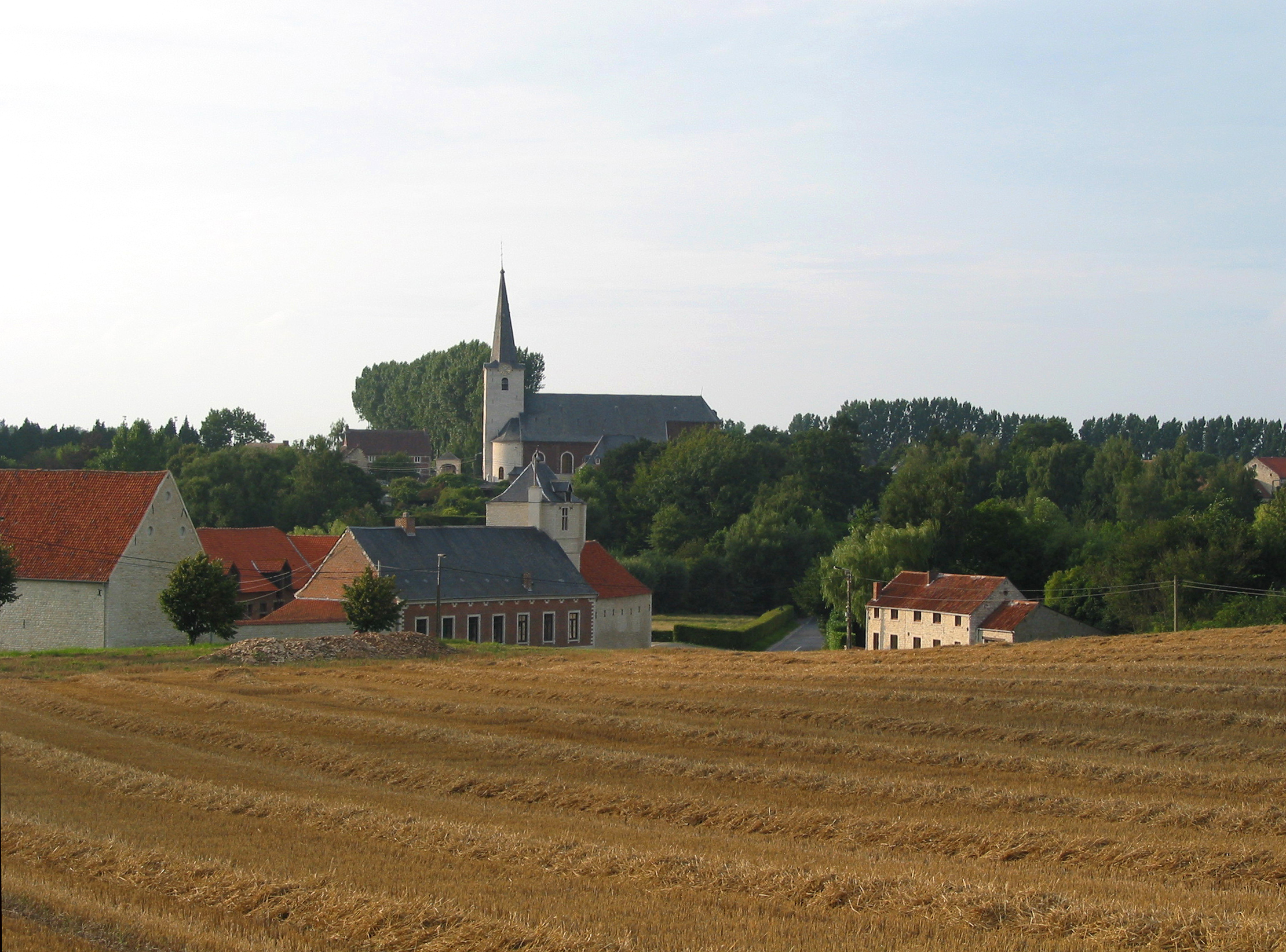

- Location in Belgium
- Coordinates: 50°44′N 04°49′E
- Country: Belgium
- Region: Wallonia
- Province: Walloon Brabant
- Municipality: Jodoigne

Mélin (French pronunciation: [melɛ̃]; Walloon: Mélin pronounced [me.'lɛ̃]) (Dutch: Malen; Walloon: Mélin-el-Hesbaye) is a village of Wallonia and a district of the municipality of Jodoigne, located in the province of Walloon Brabant, Belgium.

Mélin is a member of the Les Plus Beaux Villages de Wallonie ("The Most Beautiful Villages of Wallonia") association.
