= Ours =

Ours may refer to:

== People ==
- Ours (singer), a French singer and songwriter.
- Wes Ours (born 1977), an American football player

== Music ==
- Ours (band), an American rock group

=== Songs ===
- "Ours" (song), by Taylor Swift, 2011
- "Ours", a song by Ed Sheeran from -, 2023
- "Ours", a song by Mabel Mercer, 1955
- "Ours", a song by Meghan Patrick, 2023
- "Ours", a song by Sugar Ray, 2002
- "Ours", a song by The Bravery for the Twilight Saga: Eclipse soundtrack

== Other uses ==
- An English personal pronoun
- Ours (Moldova), a Moldovan political party

== See also ==
- Our (disambiguation)
