= Ny, Belgium =

Village in Belgium

Coordinates: 50.28517°N 5.48120°E

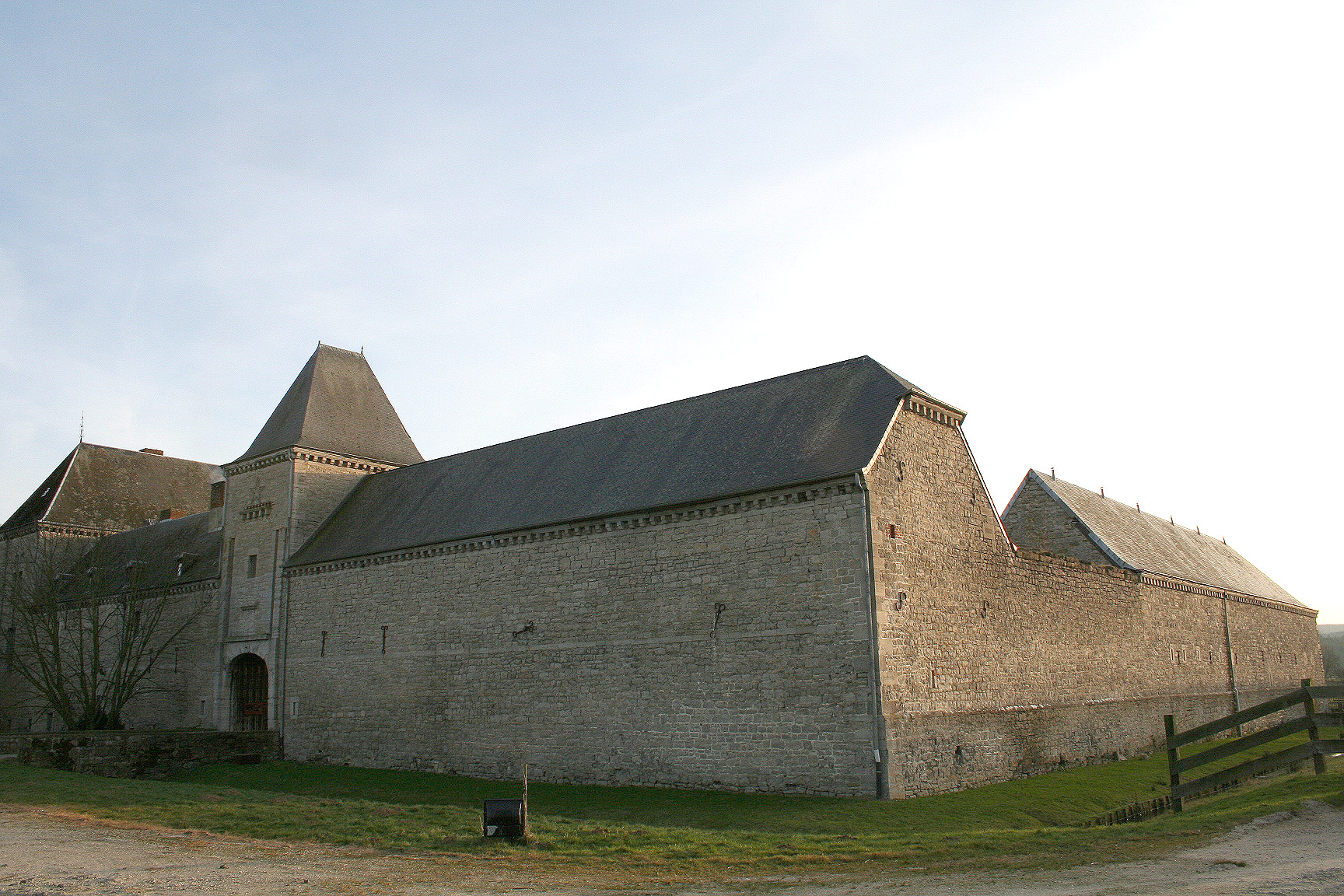
The château-ferm de Ny

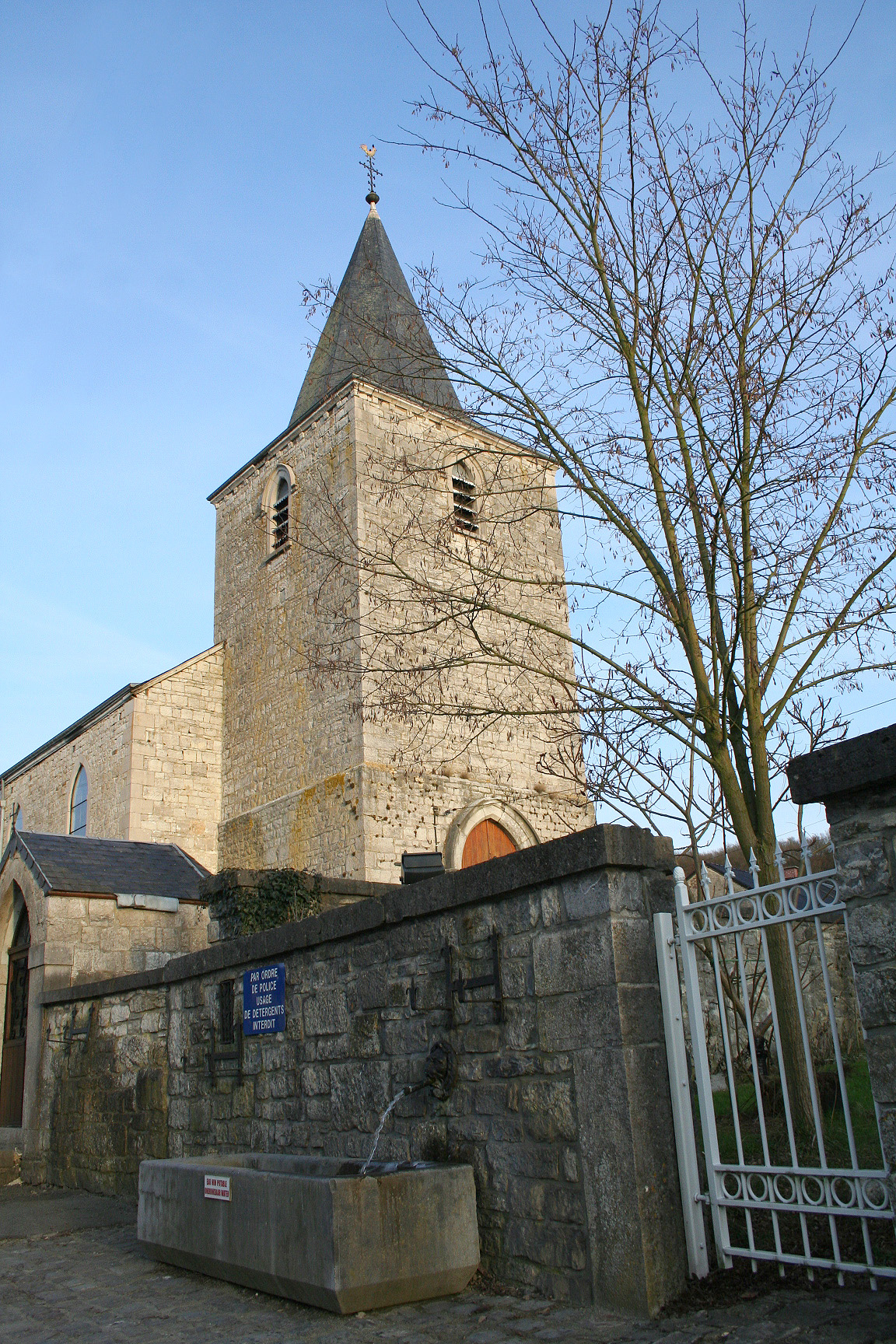
L'eglise Notre-Dame de l'Assomption (Church of Our-lady of the Assumption), Ny village

Jean-Pol GRANDMONT

Ny (French pronunciation: [ni]) is a village of Wallonia in the municipality and district of Hotton, located in the province of Luxembourg, Belgium.

== Description ==
Ny is a member of the Les Plus Beaux Villages de Wallonie, with buildings of traditional limestone or of half timbered brick construction.

The village has a large quadrilateral castle; a "château ferme" (fortified farmhouse) dating to the 17th century, a church (Notre-Dame de l'Assomption), and several chapels: Saint-Donat; Saint-Gerard; Saint-Joseph; Saint-Roch; Saint-Anne; and the chapelle de la Sainte-Familie.
