= Olne =

Municipality in Liège Province, Wallonia, Belgium

Olne Ône (Walloon)
- Municipality
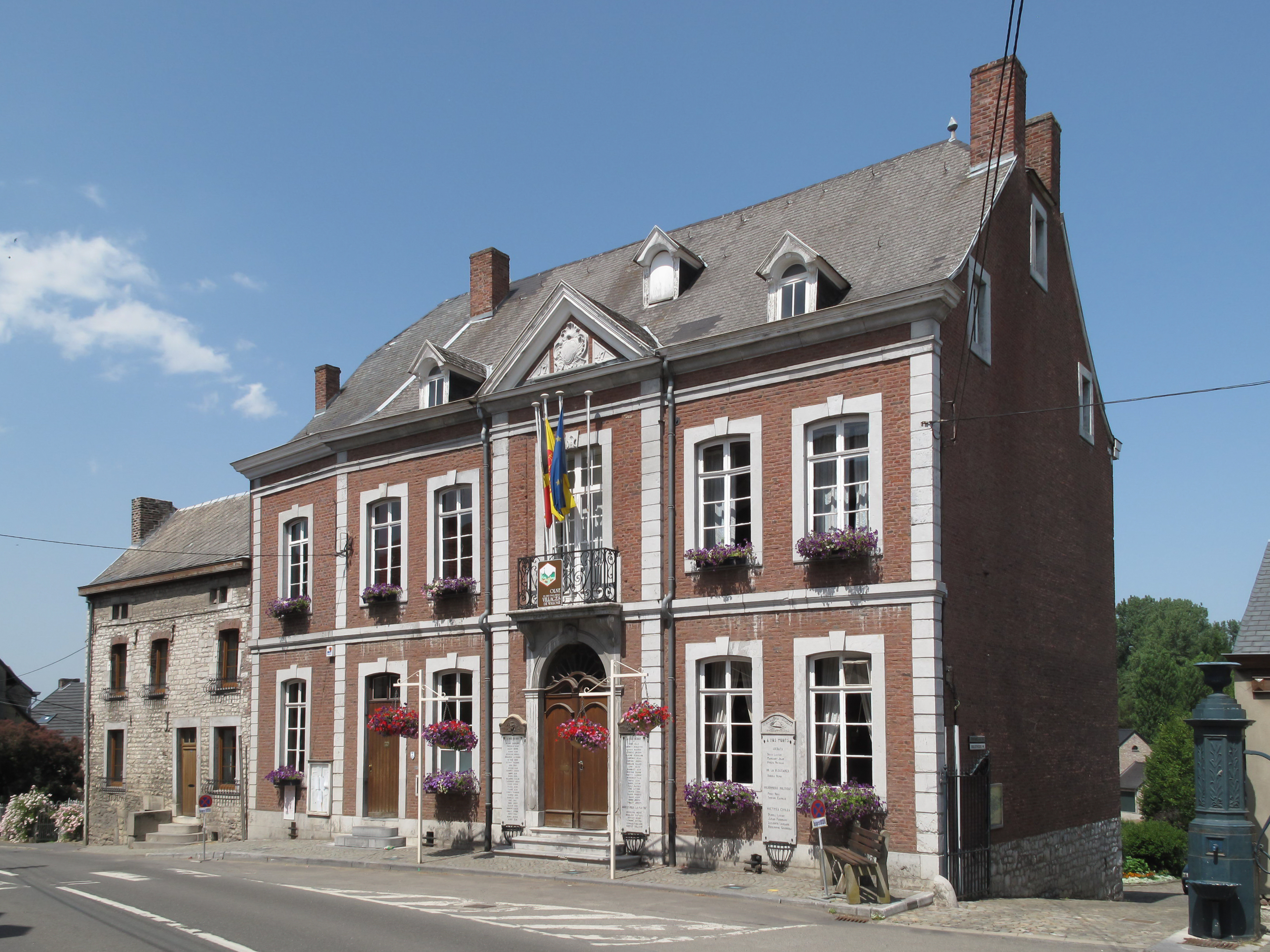
- Olne town hall

- Flag Coat of arms

- Location of Olne in the province of Liège
- Interactive map of Olne
- Location in Belgium
- Coordinates: 50°35′N 05°45′E
- Country: Belgium
- Community: French Community
- Region: Wallonia
- Province: Liège
- Arrondissement: Verviers

Government
  - Mayor: Cédric Halin
  - Governing party: POUR OLNE

Area
  - Total: 16.04 km^{2} (6.19 sq mi)

Population (2018-01-01)
  - Total: 4,087
  - Density: 254.8/km^{2} (659.9/sq mi)
- Postal codes: 4877
- NIS code: 63057
- Area codes: 087
- Website: www.olne.be

Olne (French pronunciation: [ɔln]; Walloon: Ône) is a municipality of Wallonia located in the province of Liège, Belgium.

On January 1, 2006, Olne had a total population of 3,793. The total area is 15.99 km^{2} which gives a population density of 237 inhabitants per km^{2}.

Olne was the 24th village to join Les Plus Beaux Villages de Wallonie.

== See also ==
- List of protected heritage sites in Olne
