= Schandel =

Town in Luxembourg

Coordinates: 49°48′N 5°59′E

Schandel church

Schandel (German pronunciation: [ˈʃandl̩]) is a small town in the commune of Useldange, in north-western Luxembourg. As of September 2026, the town has a population of 240.
