= List of protected heritage sites in Olne =

This table shows an overview of the protected heritage sites in the Walloon town Olne. This list is part of Belgium's national heritage.

| Object | Year/architect | Town/section | Address | Coordinates | Number^{?} | Image |
|---|---|---|---|---|---|---|
| Church of Saint-Sébastien ^{(nl)} ^{(fr)} | | Olne | | 50.590443°N 5.749457°E | 63057-CLT-0001-01 Info | Kerk Saint-Sébastien en het ensemble van de kerk, het kerhof rondom en zijn omringende muur |
| Church of Saint-Adelin and surroundings ^{(nl)} ^{(fr)} | | Olne | | 50.592028°N 5.718353°E | 63057-CLT-0002-01 Info | Ensemble van de kerk Saint-Adelin en zijn omgeving, met de spijkerlinde, pastorie, place du Fief, etc |
| Hansez pond ^{(nl)} ^{(fr)} | | Olne | | 50.575531°N 5.724928°E | 63057-CLT-0003-01 Info | Vijver van Hansez |
| "Les Fosses" ^{(nl)} ^{(fr)} | | Olne | rue Froidbermont | 50.586896°N 5.754598°E | 63057-CLT-0004-01 Info | |
| "Maison Ancion" House ^{(nl)} ^{(fr)} | | Olne | Sur le Fief n°17 | 50.591829°N 5.720358°E | 63057-CLT-0005-01 Info | |
| House ^{(nl)} ^{(fr)} | | Olne | rue du Village n°30 | 50.590455°N 5.747071°E | 63057-CLT-0006-01 Info | |
| Town hall ^{(nl)} ^{(fr)} | | Olne | place Leopold Servais n°40 | 50.590707°N 5.748142°E | 63057-CLT-0007-01 Info | Raadhuis: muren, daken, twee deuren van de hal, open haard in de bruiloftzaal, trap |
| House ^{(nl)} ^{(fr)} | | Olne | rue des Combattants n°10 | 50.589757°N 5.750222°E | 63057-CLT-0009-01 Info | |
| House ^{(nl)} ^{(fr)} | | Olne | rue du Village n°74 | 50.591005°N 5.749807°E | 63057-CLT-0010-01 Info | |
| House ^{(nl)} ^{(fr)} | | Olne | rue du Village n°29 | 50.590246°N 5.747222°E | 63057-CLT-0011-01 Info | |
| Site of Neuville ^{(nl)} ^{(fr)} | | Olne | | 50.599840°N 5.721145°E | 63057-CLT-0012-01 Info | |
| Massouheid nature area ^{(nl)} ^{(fr)} | | Olne | | 50.575483°N 5.705039°E | 63057-CLT-0013-02 Info | |
| Massouheid nature area extension ^{(nl)} ^{(fr)} | | Olne | | 50.573584°N 5.704499°E | 63057-CLT-0014-01 Info | |
| Froidbermont valley ^{(nl)} ^{(fr)} | | Olne | | 50.587487°N 5.754649°E | 63057-CLT-0016-01 Info | |

== See also ==
- List of protected heritage sites in Liège (province)
