= Lompret, Belgium =

Lompret
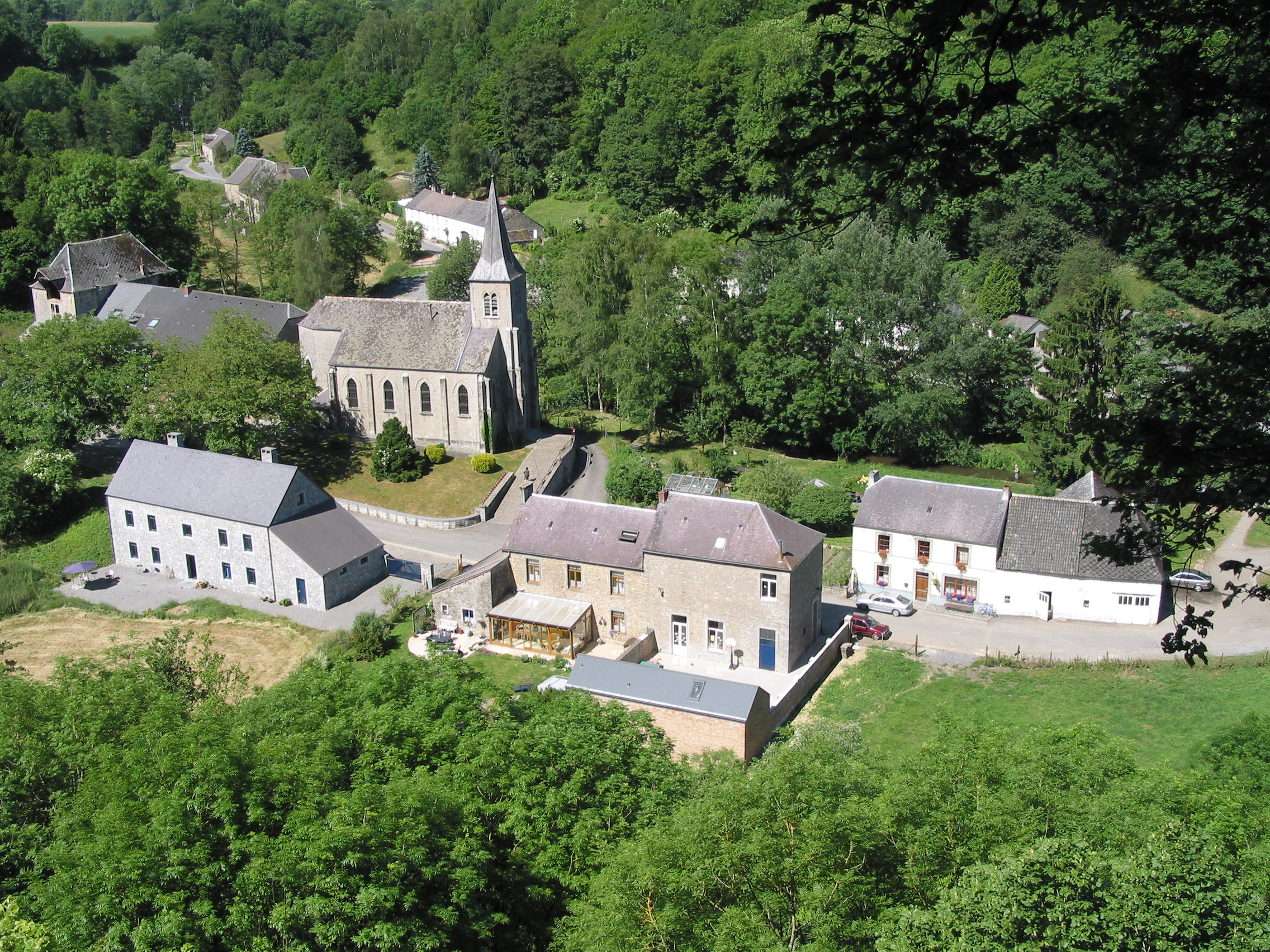

- Location in Belgium
- Coordinates: 50°03′51″N 04°22′45″E
- Country: Belgium
- Region: Wallonia
- Province: Hainaut
- Municipality: Chimay

Lompret (French pronunciation: [lɔ̃pʁɛ]; Walloon: Lompré-el-Fagne) is a village of Wallonia and a district of the municipality of Chimay, located in the province of Hainaut, Belgium.

It was a municipality of its own until January 1, 1977.

Lompret is a member of the Les Plus Beaux Villages de Wallonie ("The Most Beautiful Villages of Wallonia") association.
