= Everlange =

Town in Luxembourg

Coordinates: 49°46′N 5°57′E

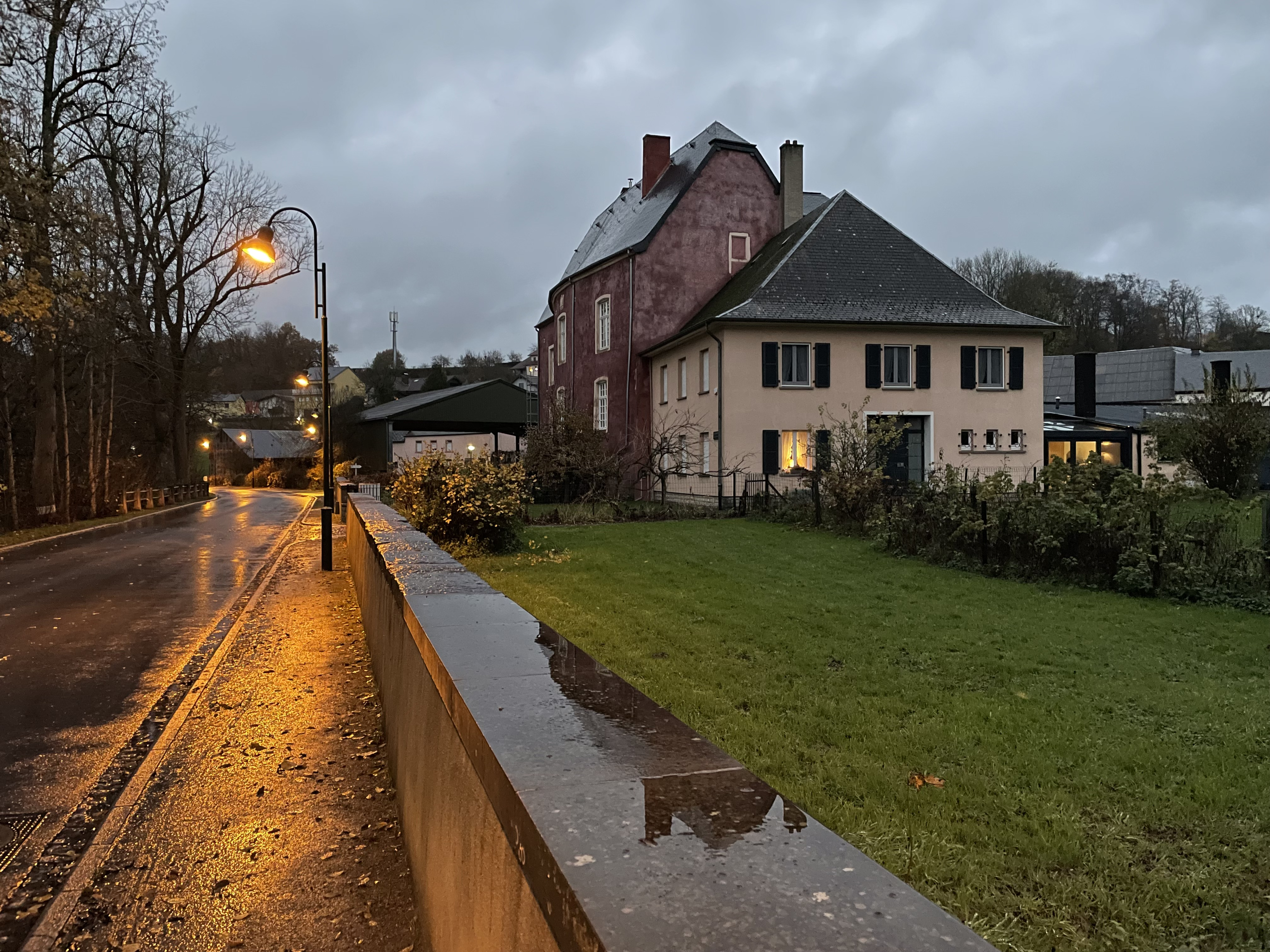
Everlange Castle (Le Château d'Everlange)

Everlange (Luxembourgish: Iewerleng, German: Everlingen) is a small town in the commune of Useldange, in western Luxembourg. As of September 2026, the town has a population of 608.
