= Wéris =

Section of Durbuy, Wallonia, Belgium

Coordinates: 50.325943°N 5.531402°E

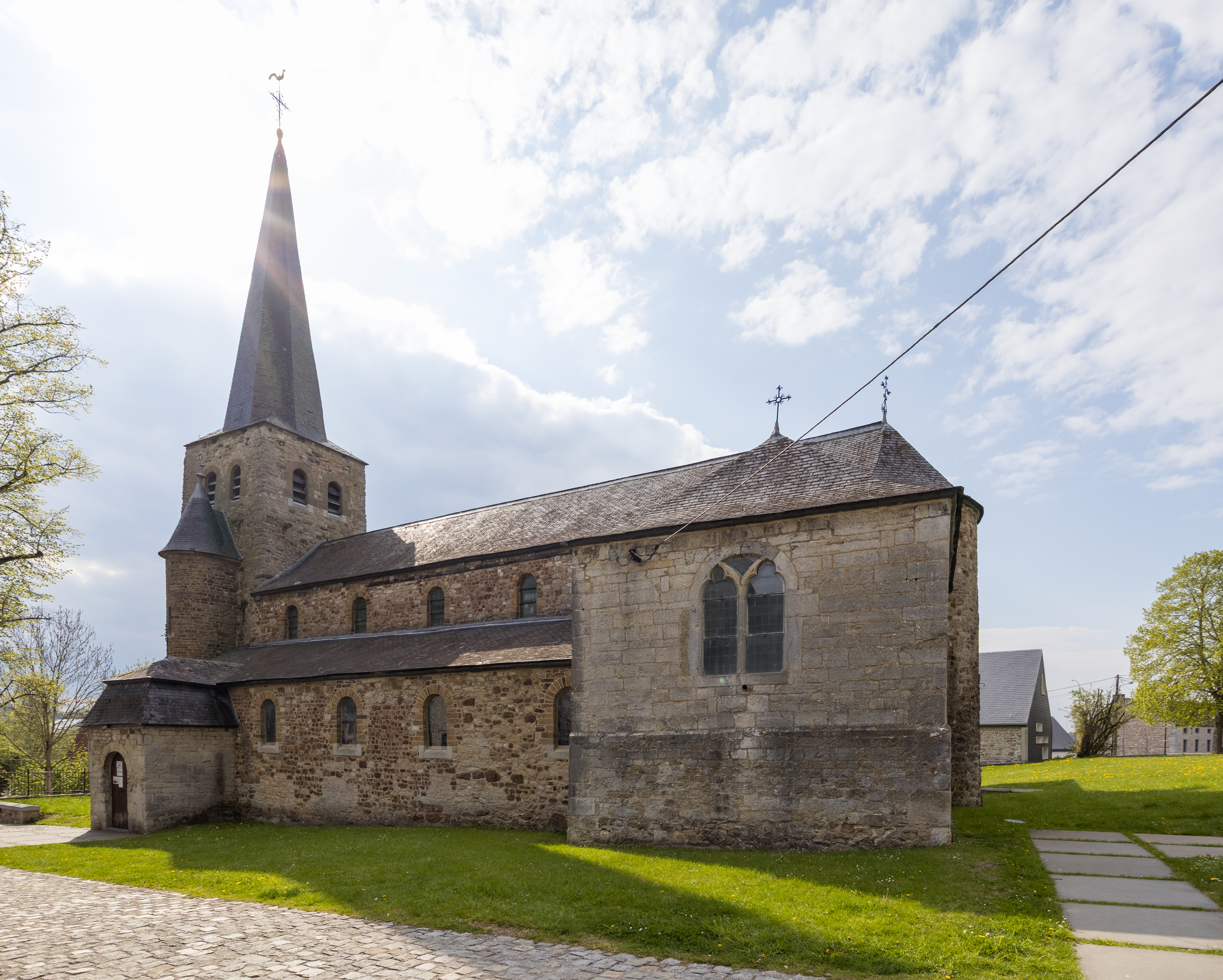
Saint Walburga Church

Wéris (Walloon: Werisse) is a village of Wallonia and district of the municipality of Durbuy, located in the province of Luxembourg, Belgium.

The village of Oppagne is part of Wéris. Till 1977 Wéris was a municipality.

The village is a member of the organisation Les Plus Beaux Villages de Wallonie.

== Wéris megaliths ==
It is well known for its megaliths, including dolmens and menhirs. There is a "Museum of Megaliths" in the centre of the village. There is a three-mile alignment of standing stones and chambered tombs that include the Dolmen de Wéris and the Dolmen d'Oppagne, as well as the Menhir Danthine, the three Menhirs d'Oppagne, and the Menhirs of Morville, Tour and Ozo. Other famous stones in the area include La Pierre Haina, the Lit du Diable (Devil's bed) and the Pas Bayard capstone, about which there are legends.

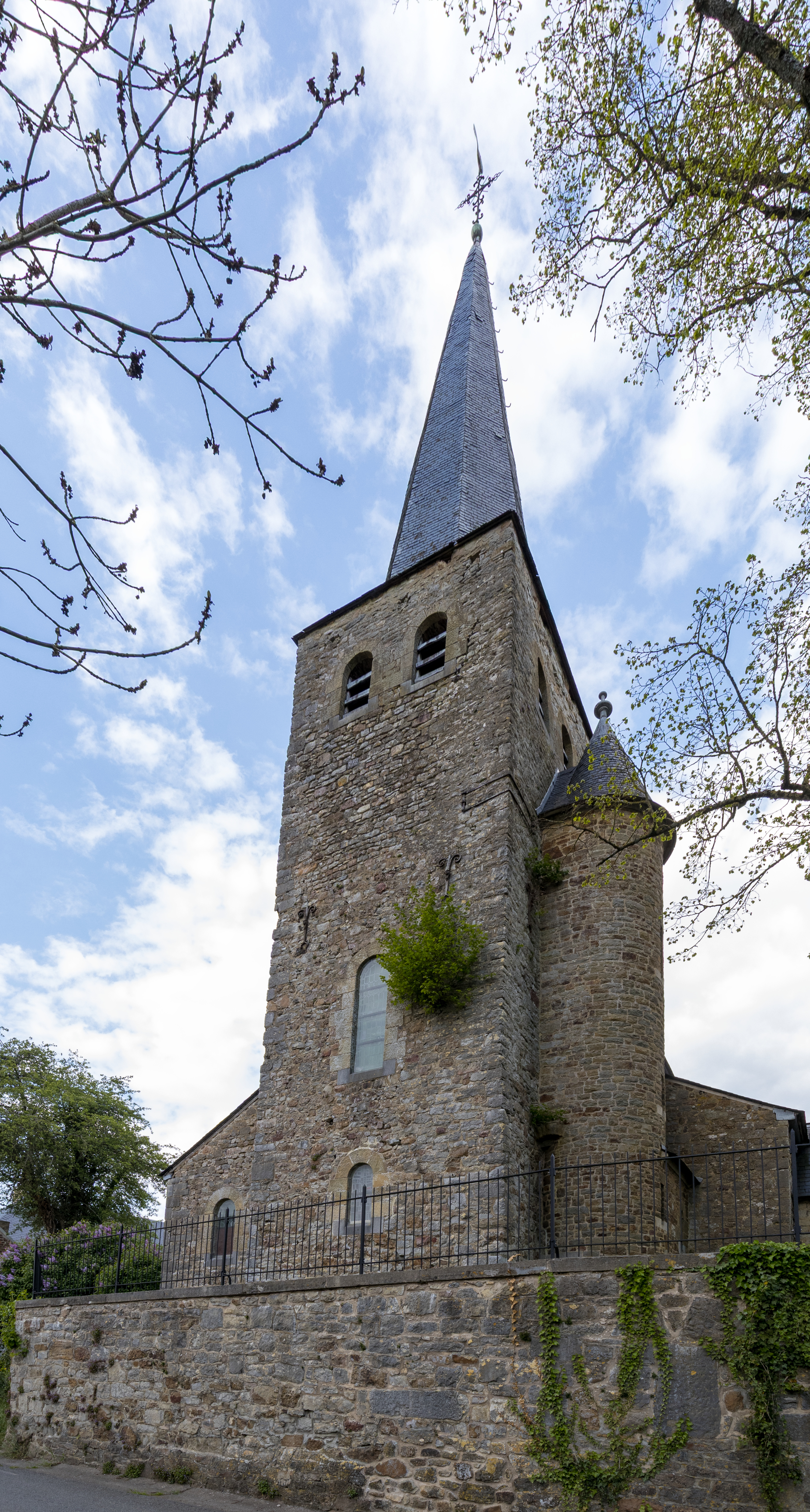
The bell tower

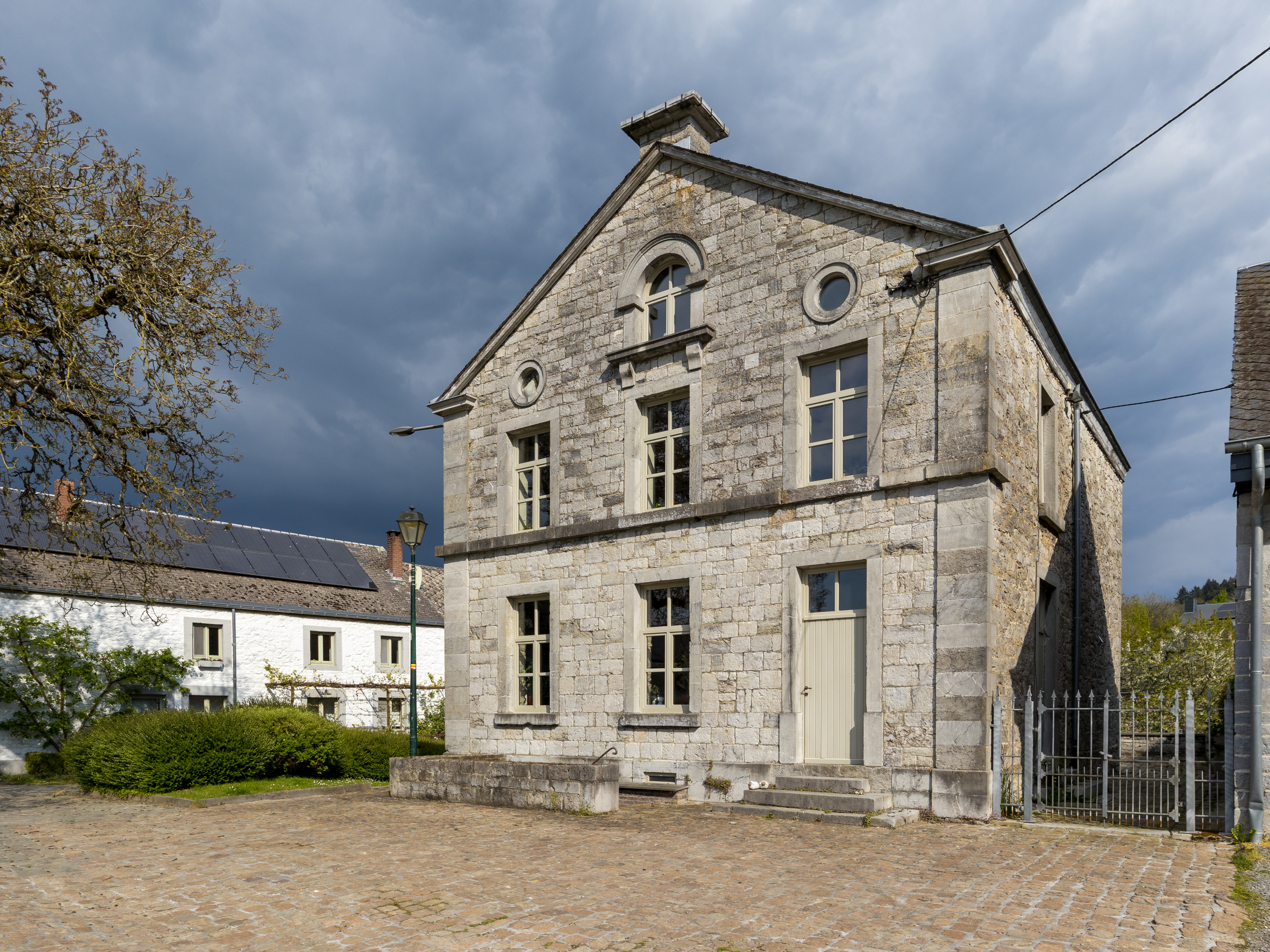
Local stone house

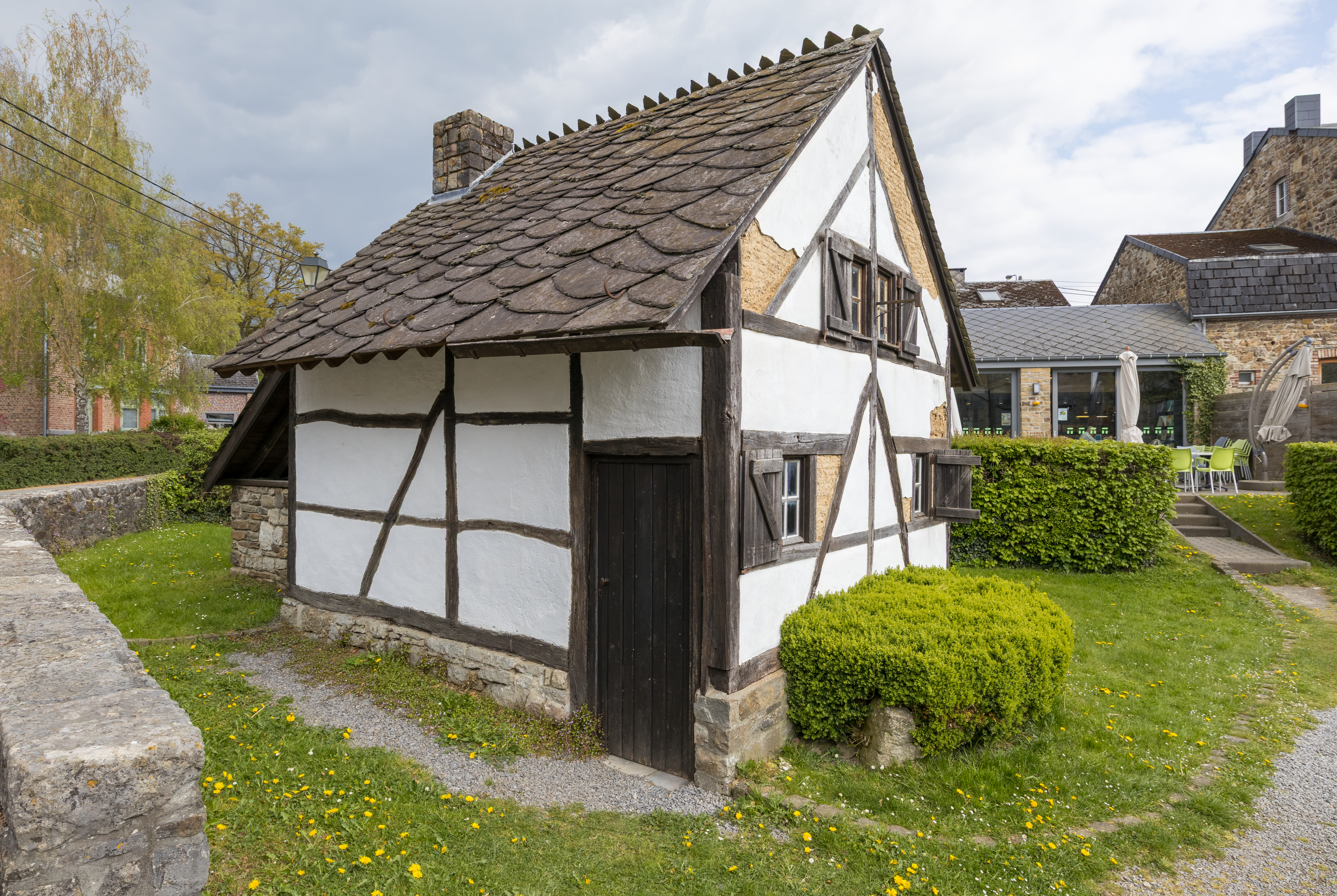
Old bread oven

Menhirs of the Long Stone Field

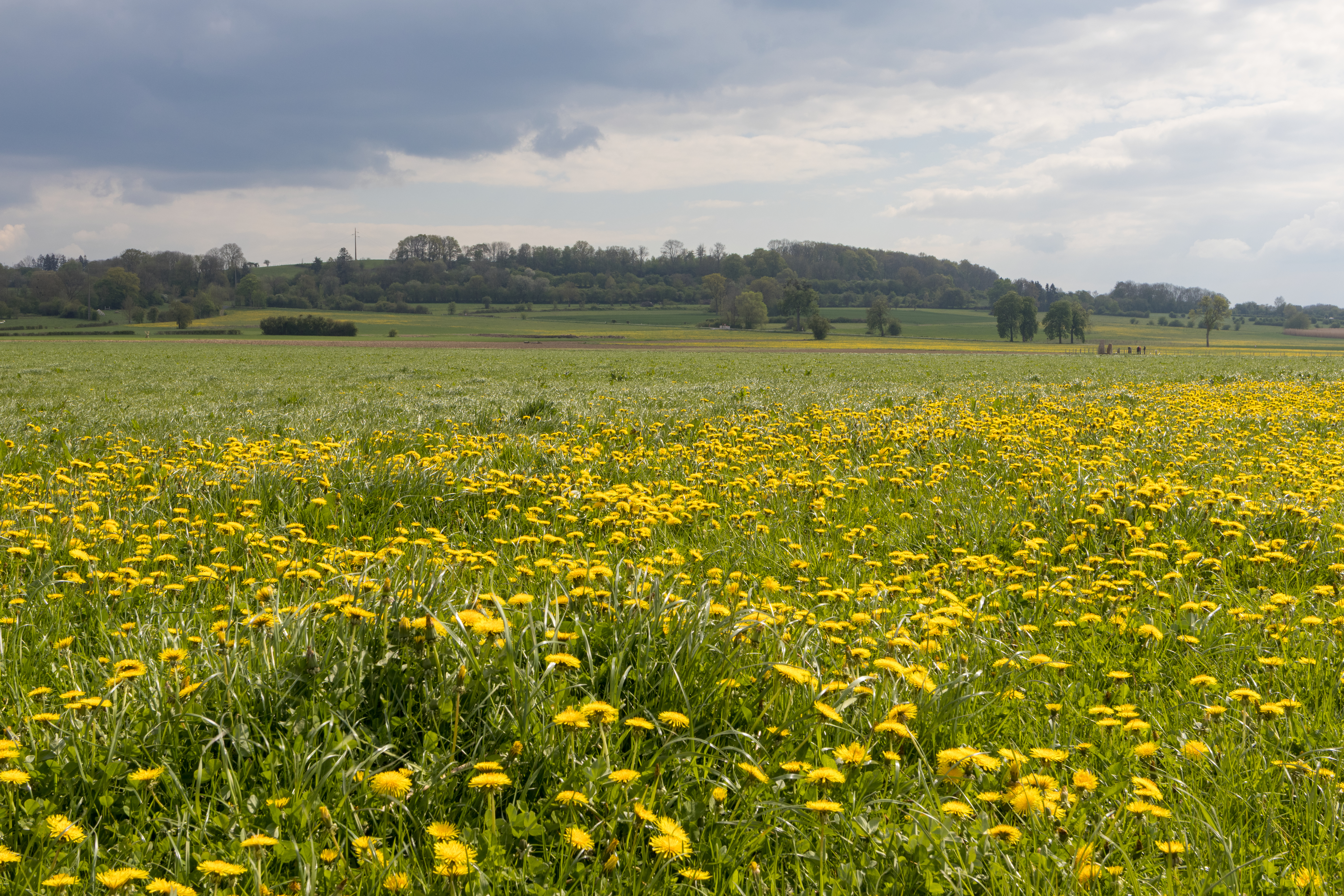
The countryside in bloom in April
