= Paliseul =

Municipality in Wallonia, Belgium

Paliseul Palijhoû (Walloon)
- Municipality
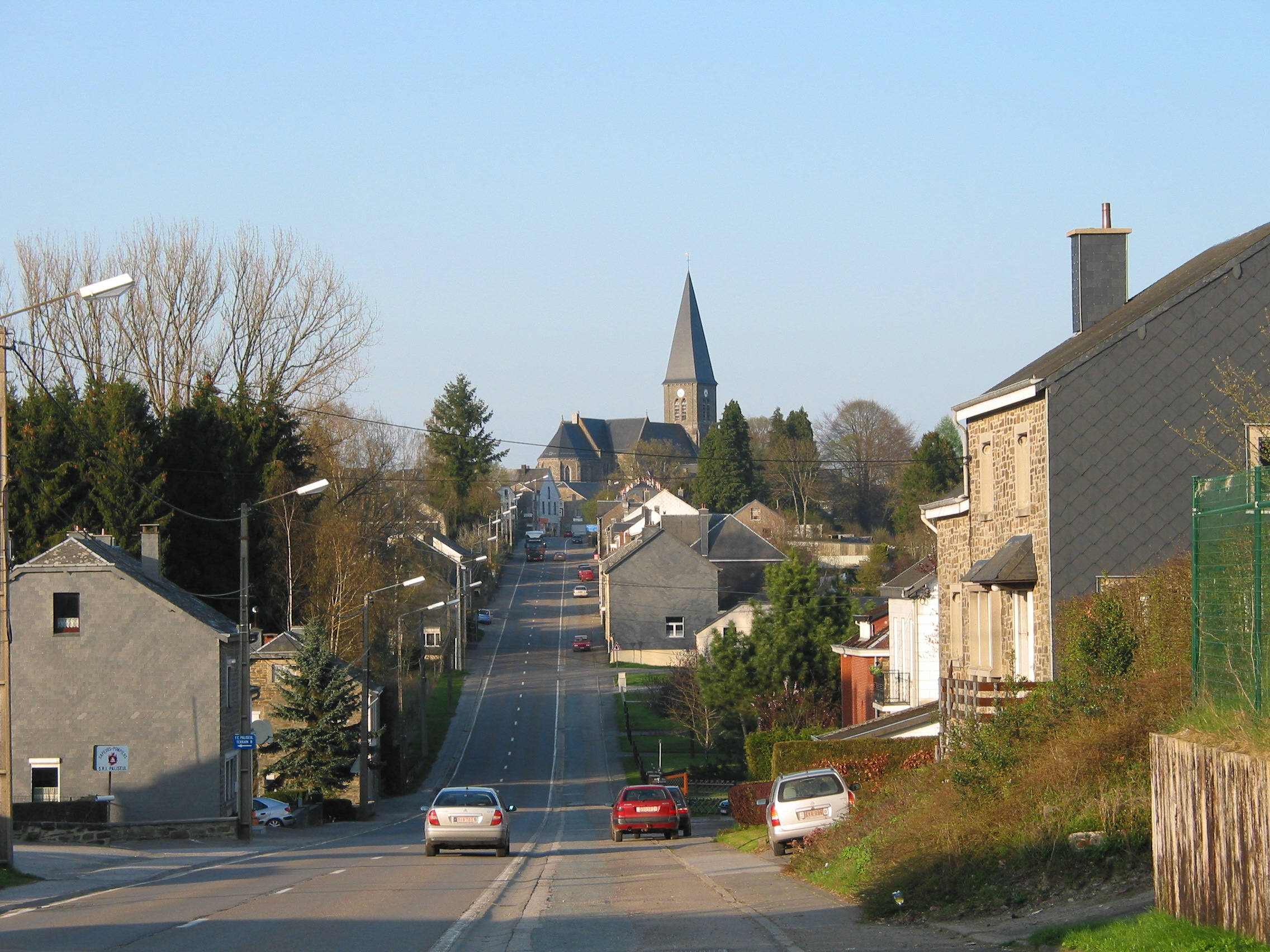
- Bouillon Street

- Flag Coat of arms

- Location of Paliseul in Luxembourg province
- Interactive map of Paliseul
- Location in Belgium
- Coordinates: 49°54′N 05°08′E
- Country: Belgium
- Community: French Community
- Region: Wallonia
- Province: Luxembourg
- Arrondissement: Neufchâteau

Government
  - Mayor: Philippe Léonard
  - Governing parties: BOURGMESTRE; Action

Area
  - Total: 111.25 km^{2} (42.95 sq mi)

Population (2018-01-01)
  - Total: 5,393
  - Density: 48.48/km^{2} (125.6/sq mi)
- Postal codes: 6850-6853, 6856
- NIS code: 84050
- Area codes: 061
- Website: (in French) paliseul.be

Paliseul (French pronunciation: [palizœl]; Walloon: Palijhoû) is a municipality of Wallonia located in the province of Luxembourg, Belgium.

On 1 January 2007 the municipality, which covers 112.96 km^{2}, had 5,055 inhabitants, giving a population density of 44.8 inhabitants per km^{2}.

The municipality consists of the following districts: Carlsbourg, Fays-les-Veneurs, Framont, Maissin, Nollevaux, Offagne, Opont, and Paliseul. Other population centers include: Beth, Bour, Merny, Our, and Plainevaux.

== Gallery ==
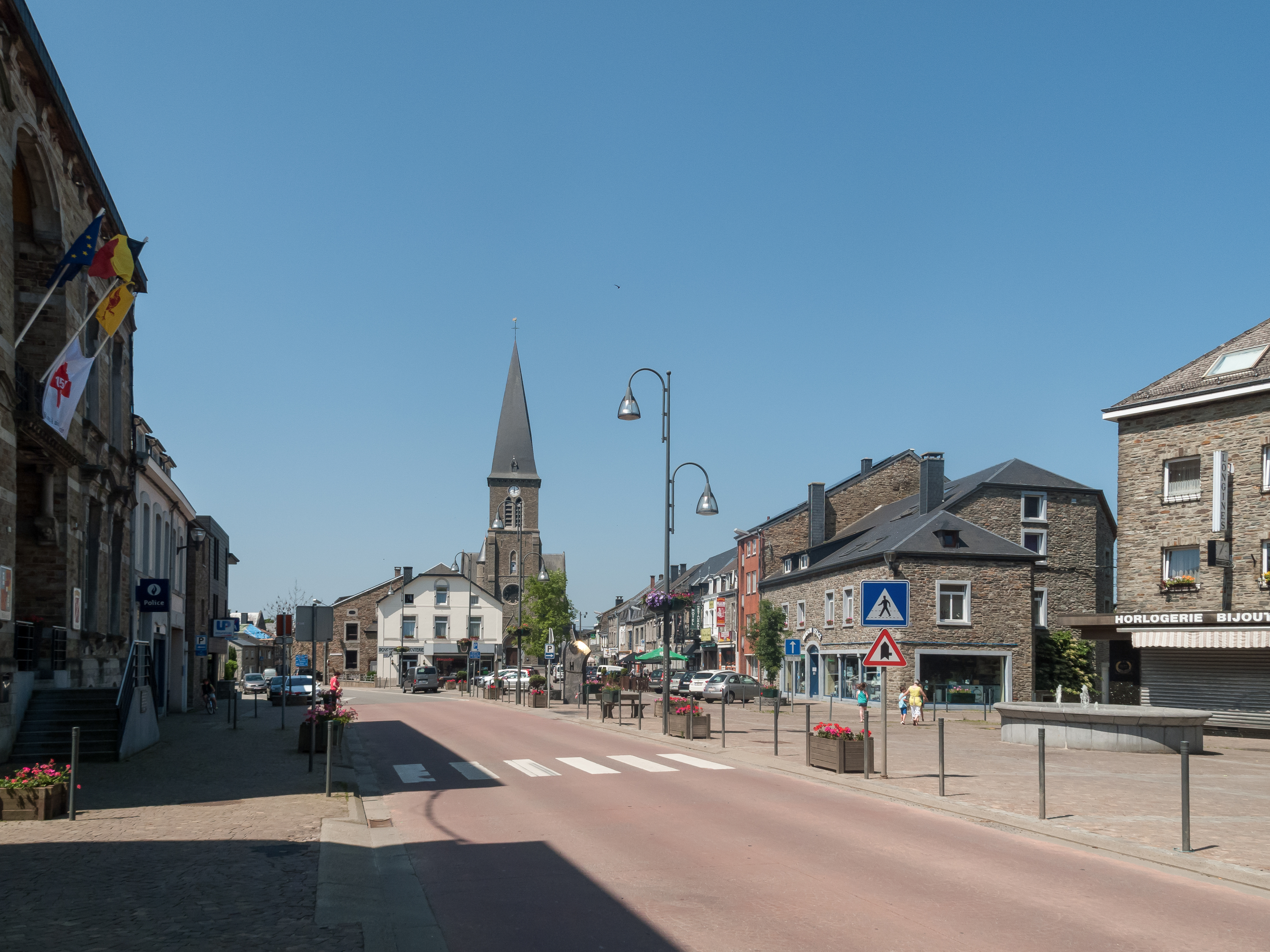
Paliseul, church (l'église Saint Eutrope)

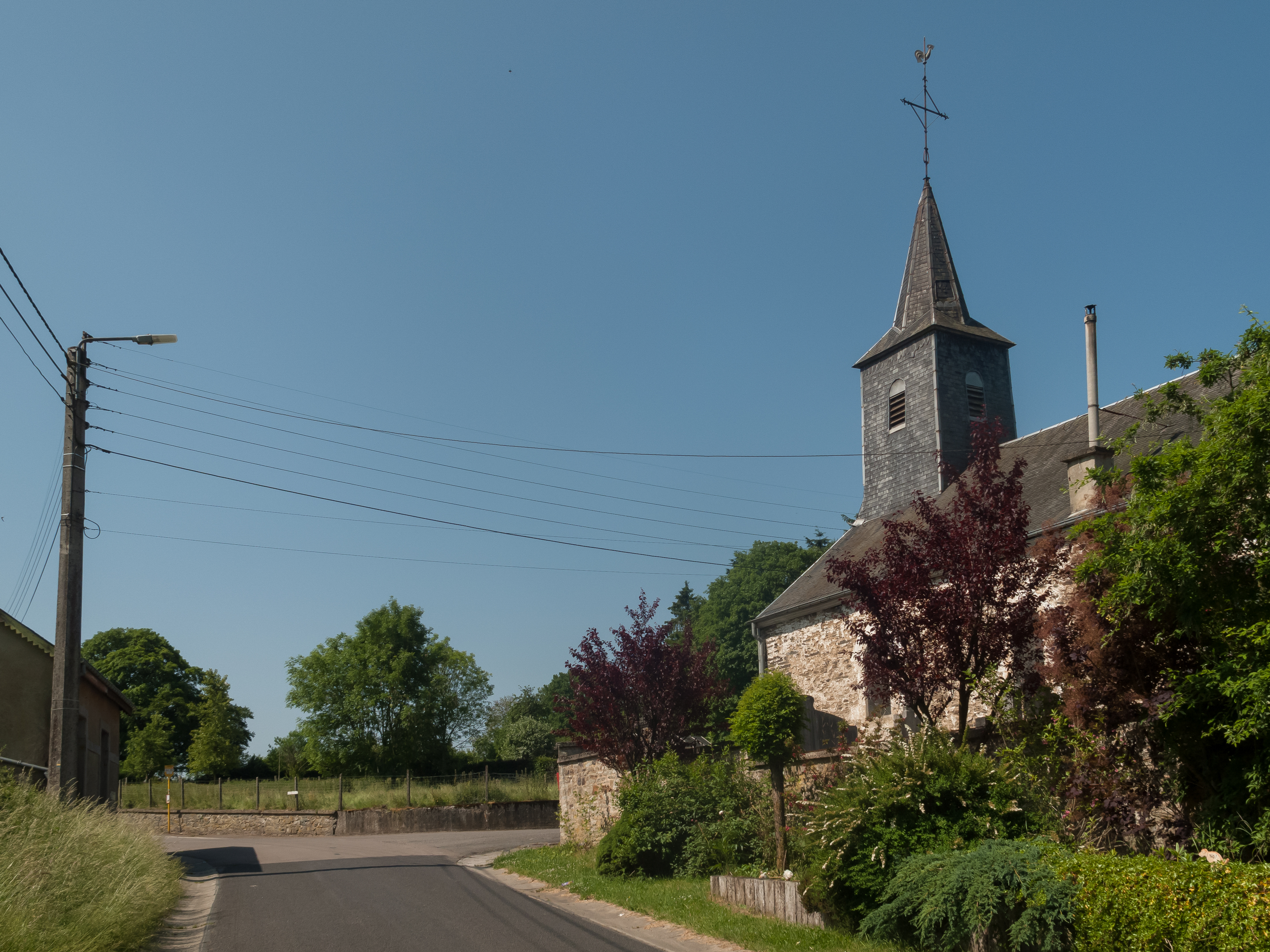
Plainevaux, church (l'église Saint Barbe)

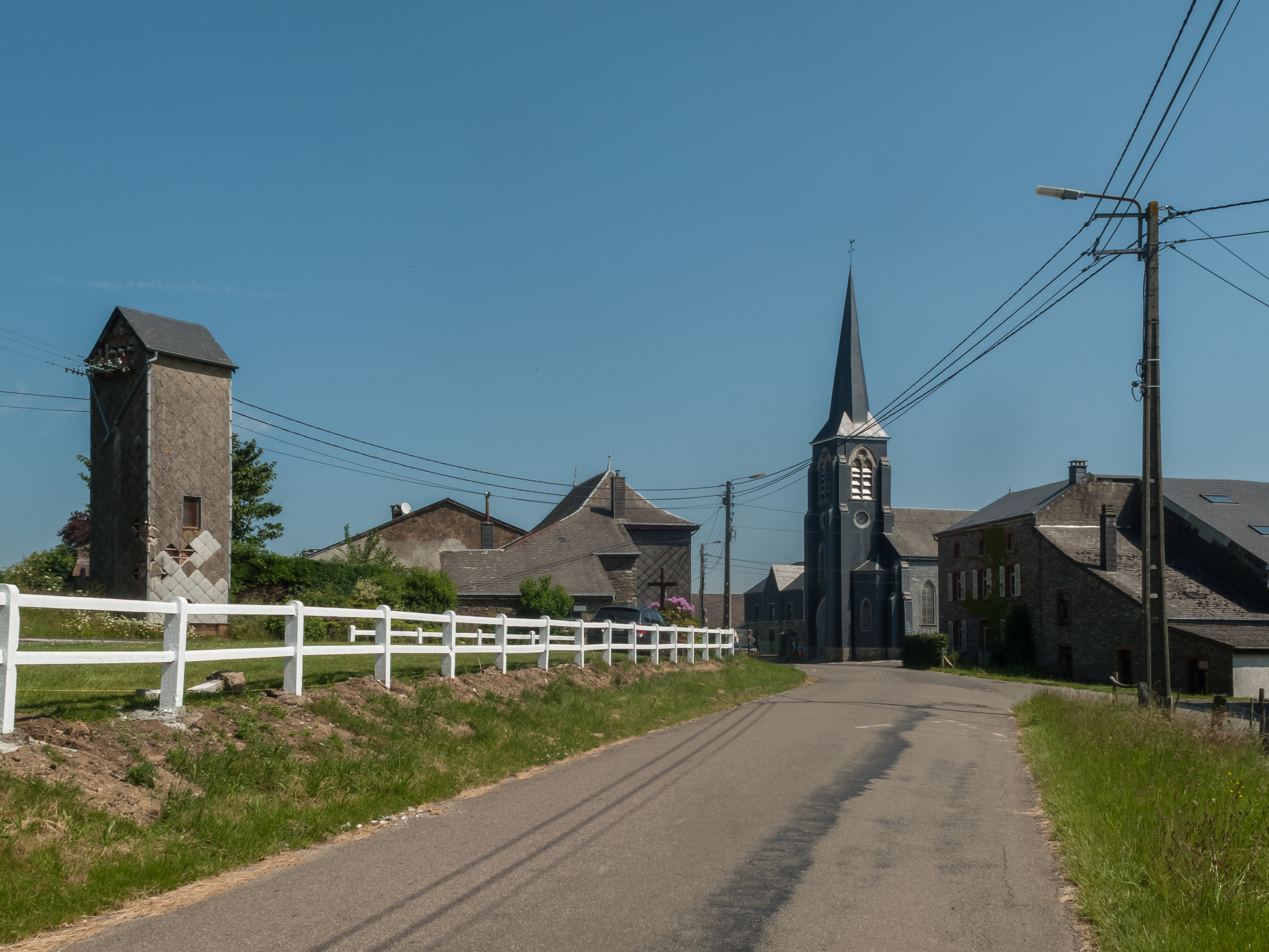
Nollevaux, church (l'église Saint-Urbain)

== See also ==
- List of protected heritage sites in Paliseul
