= Our, Belgium =

Our
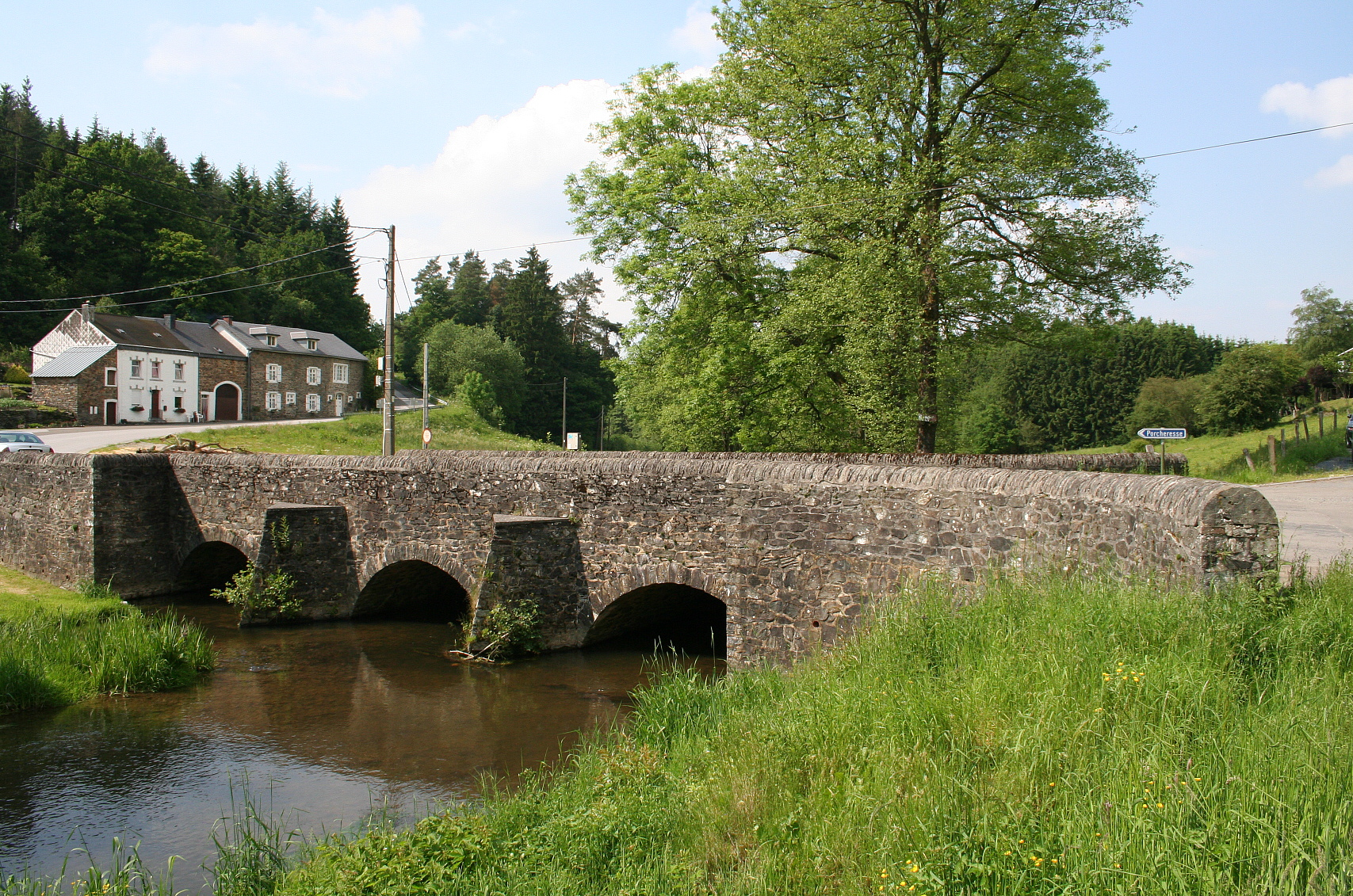
- Our

- Location within Belgium Location within Europe
- Coordinates: 49°57′35″N 05°07′25″E
- Country: Belgium
- Region: Wallonia
- Province: Luxembourg
- Municipality: Paliseul

Our (French pronunciation: [uʁ]) is a village of Wallonia in the municipality of Paliseul, district of Opont, located in the province of Luxembourg, Belgium.

The village is located on a promontory in the course of the river of the same name, Our. The village church is dedicated to Saint Lawrence. The village is a member of the association Les Plus Beaux Villages de Wallonie.
