= Useldange =

Useldange Useldeng
- Commune
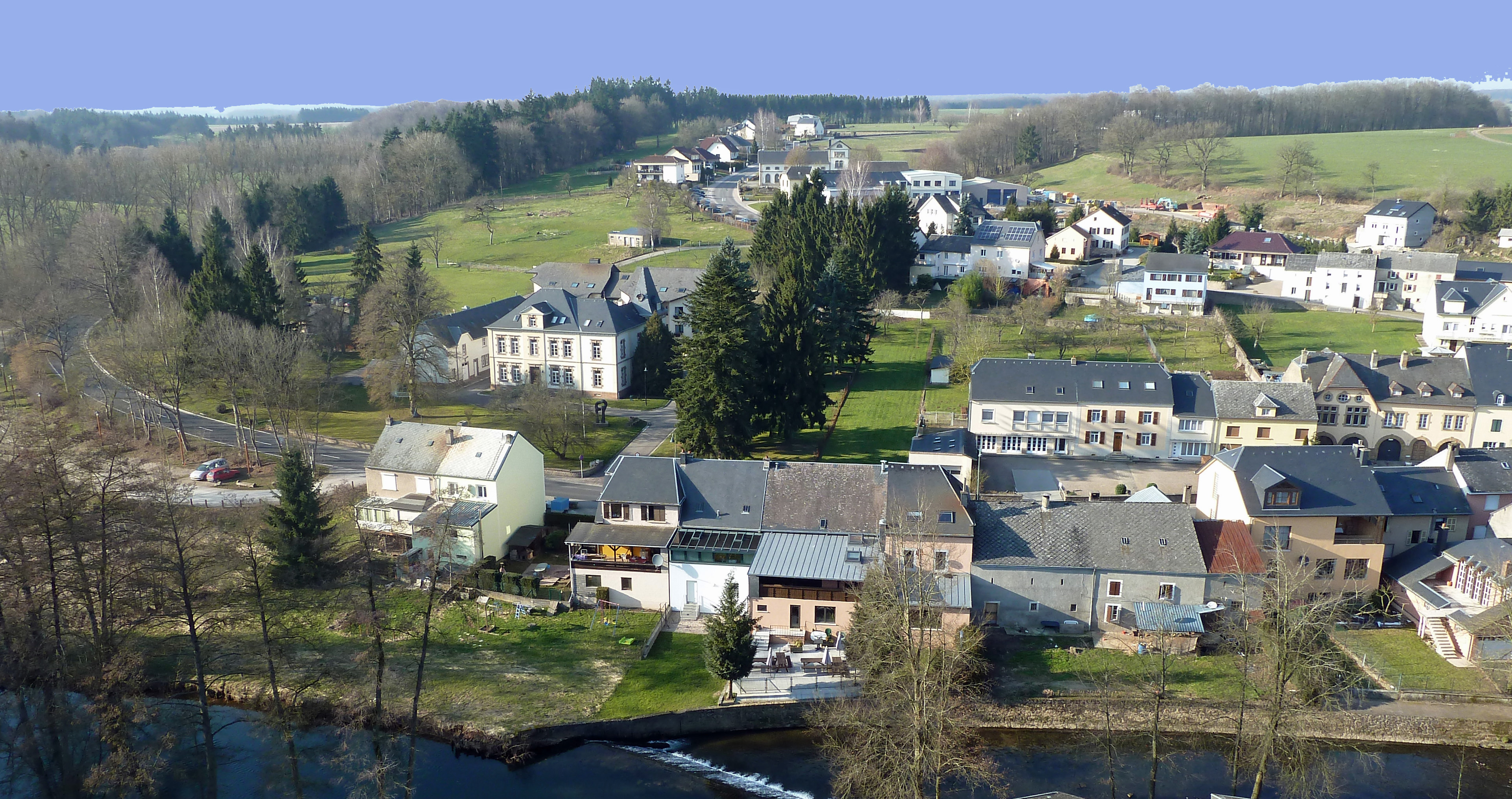

- Coat of arms

- Map of Luxembourg with Useldange highlighted in orange, and the canton in dark red
- Coordinates: 49.7689°N 5.9808°E
- Country: Luxembourg
- Canton: Redange

Government
  - Mayor: Léon Bodem

Area
  - Total: 23.92 km^{2} (9.24 sq mi)
  - Rank: 37th of 100
- Highest elevation: 377 m (1,237 ft)
  - Rank: 70th of 100
- Lowest elevation: 232 m (761 ft)
  - Rank: 43rd of 100

Population (2026)
  - Total: 2,191
  - Rank: 81st of 100
  - Density: 91.60/km^{2} (237.2/sq mi)
  - Rank: 73rd of 100
- Time zone: UTC+1 (CET)
  - Summer (DST): UTC+2 (CEST)
- LAU 2: LU0000708
- Website: useldange.lu

Useldange (French pronunciation: [yzɛldɑ̃ʒ]; Luxembourgish: Useldeng [ˈuzəldeŋ]; German: Useldingen [ˈuːzl̩ˌdɪŋən]) is a commune and small town in western Luxembourg, in the canton of Redange.

As of September 2026, the town of Useldange, which lies in the east of the commune, has a population of 1,153. Other towns within the commune include Everlange, Rippweiler, and Schandel.

Useldange Castle is a medieval castle, which, while now being mainly in ruin, also comprises the current town hall. It is located in the centre of the village, right opposite to the town's church building. The site can be visited throughout the year with special arrangements for poorly sighted visitors. It is also the location for the annual medieval festival in Luxembourg.

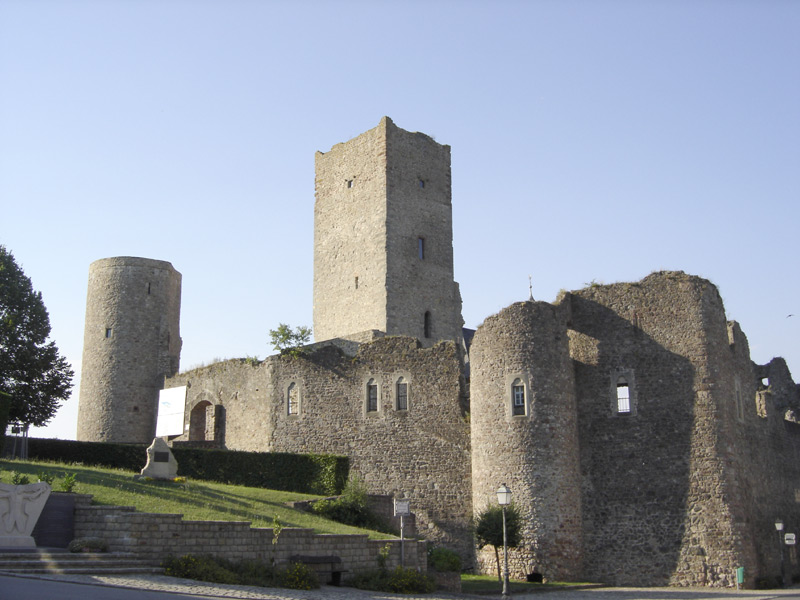
Useldange Castle

Useldange also has an airfield used by gliders (49.768611°N 5.965556°E).

== Population ==
Historical population

Year	Pop.	±%
1821	901	—
1851	1,210	+34.3%
1900	1,062	−12.2%
2910	1,149	+8.2%
1922	1,080	−6.0%
1935	1,078	−0.2%

Year	Pop.	±%
1947	1,149	+6.6%
1960	1,031	−10.3%
1970	1,059	+2.7%
1981	1,040	−1.8%
1990	1,059	+1.8%
2000	1,373	+29.7%

Year	Pop.	±%
2005	1,323	−3.6%
2010	1,472	+11.3%
2015	1,688	+14.7%
2020	1,942	+15.0%
2021	1,965	+1.2%

Source data
