= Laforêt =

Village in Wallonia, Belgium

Coordinates: 49.863°N 4.93°E

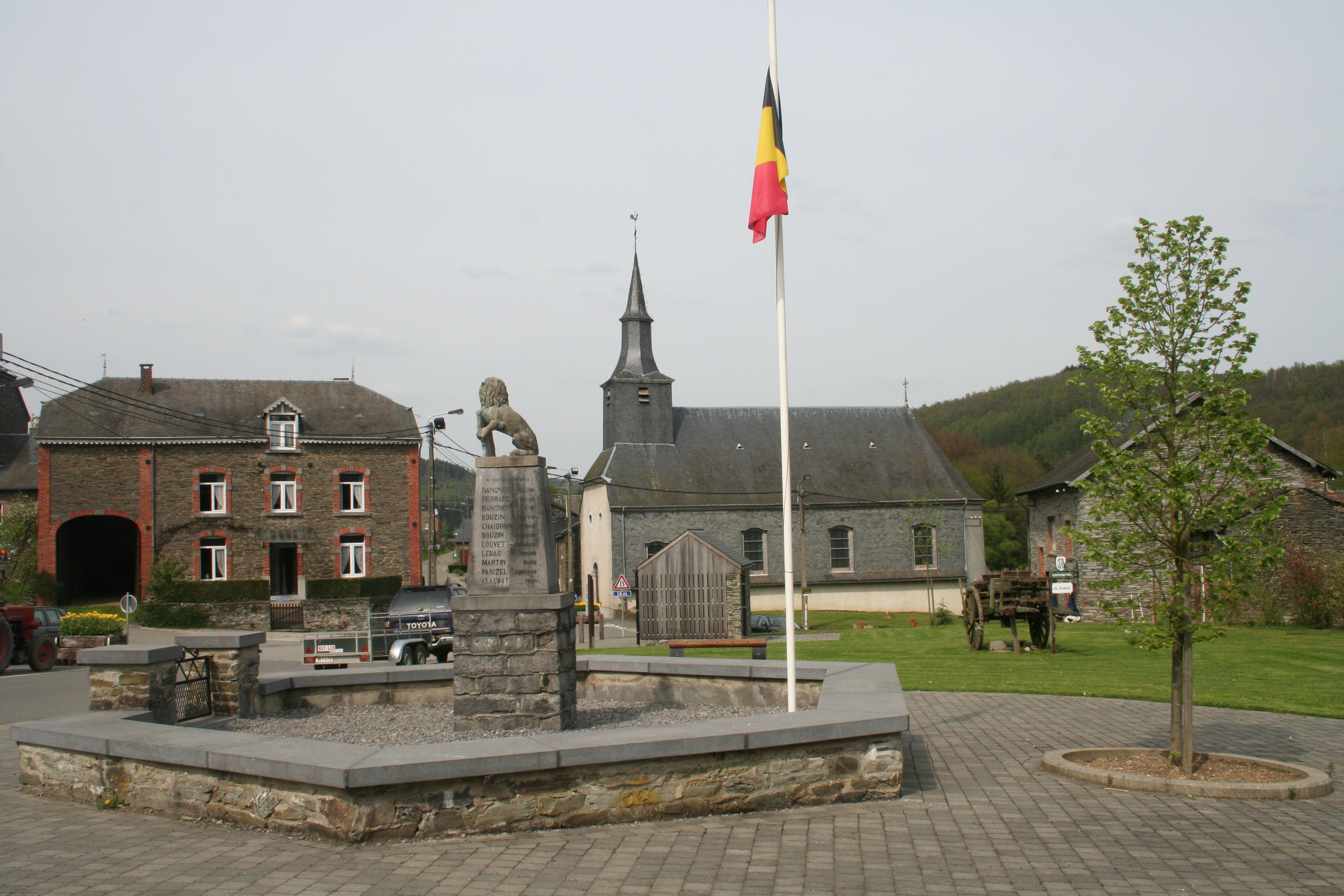
Laforêt

Laforêt (French pronunciation: [lafɔʁɛ]; Walloon: La Foret) is a village of Wallonia and a district of the municipality of Vresse-sur-Semois, located in the province of Namur, Belgium, and is close to the French border.

It was a municipality itself until 1965 when it merged with the municipality of Vresse. In the fusion of the municipalities in 1977, it became part of the Vresse-sur-Semois municipality.

It is one of the villages in the organisation Les Plus Beaux Villages de Wallonie.

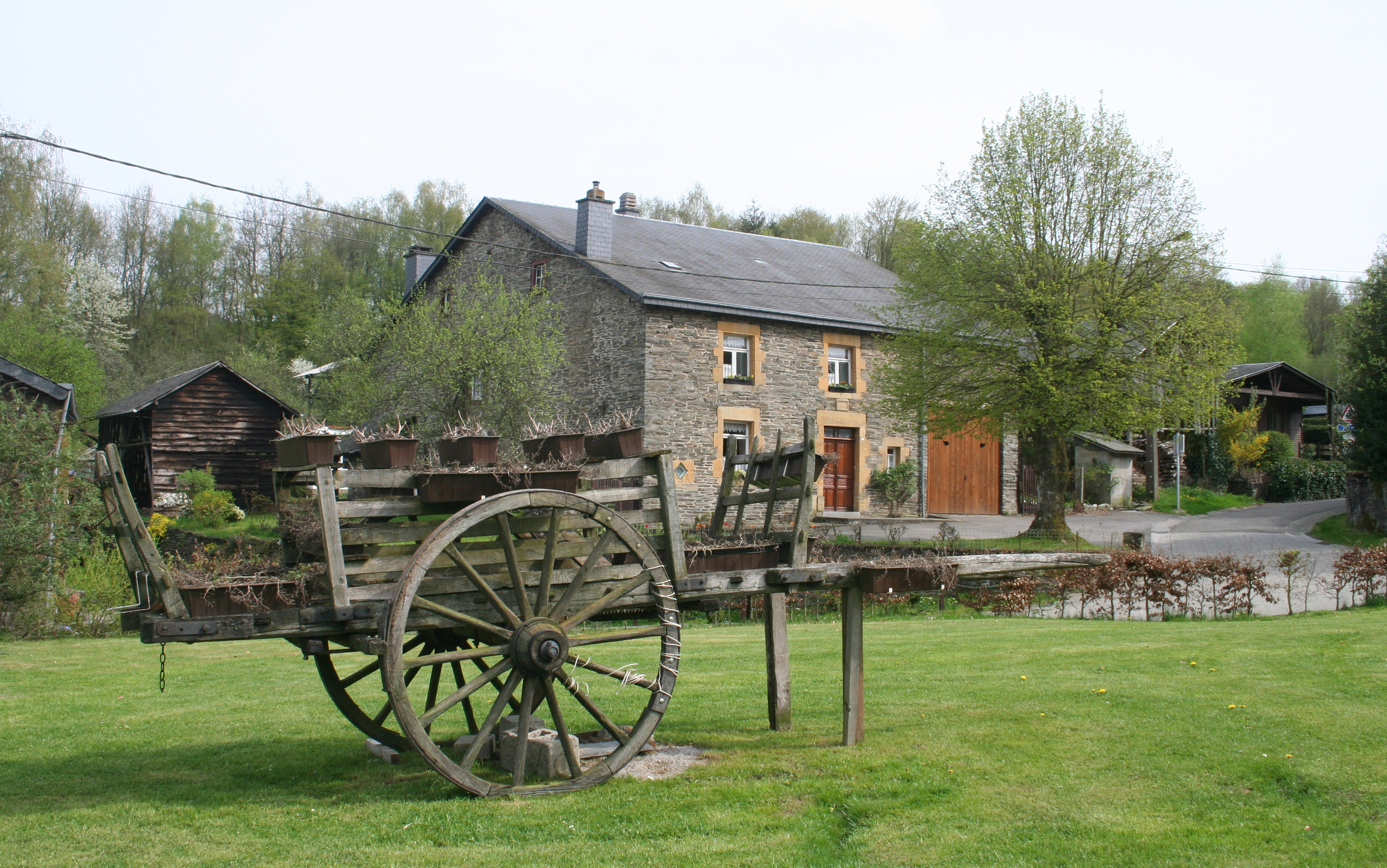
Cart in Laforêt
