= List of former municipalities in Wallonia =

At the creation of Belgium in 1831, there were 2,739 municipalities in the country, which had fallen to 2,663 municipalities by 1961. Following a series of decisions and actions, carried out in 1975, 1983, 2019, and 2024-2025 the fusion of the Belgian municipalities reduced the national total to 565 municipalities. Of these, the following is a list of the 261 municipalities in the Wallonia region of Belgium, showing the one or more municipalities that were fused into each new entity.

== A ==
- Aiseau-Presles
  - Aiseau
  - Pont-de-Loup
  - Presles
  - Roselies
- Amay
  - Amay
  - Ampsin
  - Flône
  - Jehay
  - Ombret-Rawsa
- Amblève (in German Amel)
  - Amblève
  - Heppenbach
  - Meyerode
- Andenne
  - Andenne
  - Bonneville
  - Coutisse
  - Landenne
  - Maizeret
  - Namêche
  - Sclayn
  - Seilles
  - Thon
  - Vezin
- Anderlues
- Anhée
  - Anhée
  - Annevoie-Rouillon
  - Bioul
  - Denée
  - Haut-le-Wastia
  - Sosoye
  - Warnant
- Ans
  - Ans
  - Alleur
  - Loncin
  - Xhendremael
- Anthisnes
  - Anthisnes
  - Hody
  - Tavier
  - Villers-aux-Tours
- Antoing
  - Antoing
  - Bruyelle
  - Calonne
  - Fontenoy
  - Maubray
  - Péronnes-lez-Antoing
- Arlon
  - Arlon
  - Autelbas
  - Bonnert
  - Guirsch
  - Heinsch
  - Toernich
- Assesse
  - Assesse
  - Courrière
  - Crupet
  - Florée
  - Maillen
  - Sart-Bernard
  - Sorinne-la-Longue
- Ath
  - Ath
  - Arbre
  - Bouvignies
  - Ghislenghien
  - Gibecq
  - Houtaing
  - Irchonwelz
  - Isières
  - Lanquesaint
  - Ligne
  - Maffle
  - Mainvault
  - Meslin-l'Évêque
  - Moulbaix
  - Ormeignies
  - Ostiches
  - Rebaix
  - Villers-Notre-Dame
  - Villers-Saint-Amand
- Attert
  - Attert
  - Nobressart
  - Nothomb
  - Thiaumont
  - Tontelange
- Aubange
  - Aubange
  - Athus
  - Halanzy
  - Rachecourt
- Aubel
- Awans
  - Awans
  - Fooz
  - Hognoul
  - Othée
  - Villers-l'Évêque
- Aywaille
  - Aywaille
  - Ernonheid
  - Harzé
  - Sougné-Remouchamps

== B ==
- Baelen
  - Baelen
  - Membach
- Bassenge
  - Bassenge
  - Boirs
  - Ében-Émael
  - Glons
  - Roclenge-sur-Geer
  - Wonck
- Bastogne
  - Bastogne
  - Bertogne
  - Longvilly
  - Noville-lez-Bastogne
  - Villers-la-Bonne-Eau
  - Wardin
- Beaumont
  - Beaumont
  - Barbençon
  - Leugnies
  - Leval-Chaudeville
  - Renlies
  - Solre-Saint-Géry
  - Strée
  - Thirimont
- Beauraing
  - Beauraing
  - Baronville
  - Dion
  - Felenne
  - Feschaux
  - Focant
  - Froidfontaine
  - Honnay
  - Javingue
  - Martouzin-Neuville
  - Pondrôme
  - Vonêche
  - Wancennes
  - Wiesme
  - Winenne
- Beauvechain
  - Beauvechain
  - Hamme-Mille
  - Tourinnes-la-Grosse
  - Nodebais
  - L'Écluse
- Belœil
  - Belœil
  - Aubechies
  - Basècles
  - Ellignies-Sainte-Anne
  - Grandglise
  - Quevaucamps
  - Ramegnies
  - Stambruges
  - Thumaide
  - Wadelincourt
- Berloz
  - Berloz
  - Corswarem
  - Rosoux-Crenwick
- Bernissart
  - Bernissart (1964)
    - Bernissart
    - Harchies
  - Blaton
  - Pommerœul (1964)
    - Pommerœul
    - Ville-Pommerœul
- Bertogne
  - Bertogne
  - Flamierge
  - Longchamps
- Bertrix
  - Bertrix
  - Auby-sur-Semois
  - Cugnon
  - Jehonville
  - Orgeo
- Beyne-Heusay
  - Beyne-Heusay
  - Bellaire
  - Queue-du-Bois
- Bièvre
  - Bièvre
  - Graide
  - Monceau-en-Ardenne (1964)
    - Monceau-en-Ardenne
    - Bellefontaine (Bièvre)
    - Petit-Fays
  - Naomé
  - Oizy (1964)
    - Oizy
    - Baillamont
    - Cornimont
    - Grosfays
- Binche
  - Binche (1882)
    - Binche
    - Battignies
  - Bray
  - Buvrinnes
  - Épinois
  - Leval-Trahegnies
  - Péronnes-lez-Binche
  - Ressaix
  - Waudrez
- Blegny
  - Barchon
  - Housse
  - Mortier
  - Saint-Remy
  - Saive
  - Trembleur
- Bouillon
  - Bouillon
  - Bellevaux
  - Corbionn
  - Dohan
  - Les Hayons
  - Noirefontaine
  - Poupehan
  - Rochehaut
  - Sensenruth
  - Ucimont
  - Vivy
- Boussu
  - Boussu
  - Hornu
- Braine-l'Alleud
  - Braine-l'Alleud
  - Lillois-Witterzée
  - Ophain-Bois-Seigneur-Isaac
- Braine-le-Château
  - Braine-le-Château
  - Wauthier-Braine
- Braine-le-Comte
  - Braine-le-Comte
  - Hennuyères
  - Henripont
  - Petit-Rœulx-lez-Braine
  - Ronquières
  - Steenkerque
- Braives
  - Braives
  - Avennes
  - Ciplet
  - Fallais
  - Fumal
  - Latinne
  - Tourinne
  - Ville-en-Hesbaye
- Brugelette
  - Brugelette
  - Attre
  - Cambron-Casteau
  - Gages
  - Mévergnies-lez-Lens
- Brunehaut
  - Bléharies
  - Guignies
  - Hollain
  - Howardries
  - Jollain-Merlin
  - Laplaigne
  - Lesdain
  - Rongy
  - Wez-Velvain
- Büllingen (Bullange)
  - Büllingen
  - Manderfeld
  - Rocherath
- Burdinne
  - Burdinne
  - Hannêche
  - Lamontzée
  - Marneffe
  - Oteppe (1952)
    - Oteppe
    - Vissoul
- Burg-Reuland
  - Reuland
  - Thommen
- Bütgenbach (Butgenbach)
  - Bütgenbach
  - Elsenborn

== C ==
- La Calamine (Kelmis)
  - La Calamine
  - Hergenrath
  - Neu-Moresnet
- Celles
  - Celles
  - Escanaffles
  - Molenbaix
  - Popuelles
  - Pottes
  - Velaines
- Cerfontaine
  - Cerfontaine
  - Daussois
  - Senzeille
  - Silenrieux
  - Soumoy
  - Villers-Deux-Églises
- Chapelle-lez-Herlaimont
  - Chapelle-lez-Herlaimont
  - Godarville
  - Piéton
- Charleroi
  - Charleroi
  - Couillet
  - Dampremy
  - Gilly
  - Gosselies
  - Goutroux
  - Jumet
  - Lodelinsart
  - Marchienne-au-Pont
  - Marcinelle
  - Monceau-sur-Sambre
  - Montignies-sur-Sambre
  - Mont-sur-Marchienne
  - Ransart
  - Roux
- Chastre
  - Chastre-Villeroux-Blanmont
  - Cortil-Noirmont
  - Gentinnes
  - Saint-Géry
- Châtelet
  - Châtelet
  - Bouffioulx
  - Châtelineau
- Chaudfontaine
  - Chaudfontaine
  - Beaufays
  - Embourg
  - Vaux-sous-Chèvremont
- Chaumont-Gistoux
  - Chaumont-Gistoux
  - Bonlez
  - Corroy-le-Grand
  - Dion-Valmont (1970)
    - Dion-le-Mont
    - Dion-le-Val
  - Longueville
- Chièvres
  - Chièvres
  - Grosage
  - Huissignies
  - Ladeuze
  - Tongre-Notre-Dame
  - Tongre-Saint-Martin
- Chimay
  - Chimay
  - Baileux
  - Bailièvre
  - Bourlers
  - Forges
  - L'Escaillère
  - Lompret
  - Rièzes
  - Robechies
  - Saint-Remy
  - Salles
  - Vaulx
  - Villers-la-Tour
  - Virelles
- Chiny
  - Chiny
  - Izel
  - Jamoigne
  - Les Bulles
  - Suxy
  - Termes
- Ciney
  - Ciney
  - Achêne
  - Braibant
  - Chevetogne
  - Conneux
  - Leignon
  - Pessoux
  - Serinchamps
  - Sovet
- Clavier
  - Clavier
  - Bois-et-Borsu
  - Les Avins
  - Ocquier
  - Pailhe
  - Terwagne
- Colfontaine
  - Pâturages
  - Warquignies
  - Wasmes
- Comblain-au-Pont
  - Comblain-au-Pont
  - Poulseur
- Comines-Warneton
  - Comines
  - Bas-Warneton
  - Houthem
  - Ploegsteert
  - Warneton
- Courcelles
  - Courcelles
  - Gouy-lez-Piéton
  - Souvret
  - Trazegnies
- Court-Saint-Étienne
- Couvin
  - Couvin
  - Aublain
  - Boussu-en-Fagne
  - Brûly
  - Brûly-de-Pesche
  - Cul-des-Sarts
  - Dailly
  - Frasnes-lez-Couvin
  - Gonrieux
  - Mariembourg
  - Pesche
  - Petigny
  - Petite-Chapelle
  - Presgaux
- Crisnée
  - Crisnée
  - Fize-le-Marsal
  - Kemexhe
  - Odeur
  - Thys

== D ==
- Dalhem
  - Dalhem
  - Berneau
  - Bombaye
  - Feneur
  - Mortroux
  - Neufchâteau
  - Saint-André
  - Warsage
- Daverdisse
  - Daverdisse
  - Gembes
  - Haut-Fays
  - Porcheresse
- Dinant
  - Dinant
  - Anseremme
  - Bouvignes
  - Dréhance
  - Falmagne
  - Falmignoul
  - Foy-Notre-Dame
  - Furfooz
  - Lisogne
  - Sorinnes
  - Thynes
- Dison
  - Dison
  - Andrimont
- Doische
  - Doische
  - Gimnée
  - Gochenée
  - Matagne-la-Grande
  - Matagne-la-Petite
  - Niverlée
  - Romerée
  - Soulme
  - Vaucelles
  - Vodelée
- Donceel
  - Donceel
  - Haneffe
  - Jeneffe
  - Limont
- Dour
  - Dour
  - Blaugies
  - Élouges
  - Wihéries
- Durbuy
  - Durbuy
  - Barvaux-sur-Ourthe
  - Bende
  - Bomal
  - Borlon
  - Grandhan
  - Heyd
  - Izier
  - Septon
  - Tohogne
  - Villers-Sainte-Gertrude
  - Wéris

== E ==
- Écaussinnes
  - Écaussinnes-d'Enghien
  - Écaussinnes-Lalaing
  - Marche-lez-Écaussinnes
- Éghezée
  - Éghezée
  - Aische-en-Refail
  - Bolinne
  - Boneffe
  - Branchon
  - Dhuy
  - Hanret
  - Leuze
  - Liernu
  - Longchamps
  - Mehaigne
  - Noville-sur-Mehaigne
  - Saint-Germain
  - Taviers
  - Upigny
  - Waret-la-Chaussée
- Ellezelles
  - Ellezelles
  - Lahamaide
  - Wodecq
- Enghien
  - Enghien
  - Marcq
  - Petit-Enghien
- Engis
  - Engis
  - Clermont-sous-Huy
  - Hermalle-sous-Huy
- Érezée
  - Érezée
  - Amonines
  - Mormont
  - Soy
- Erquelinnes
  - Erquelinnes
  - Bersillies-l'Abbaye
  - Grand-Reng
  - Hantes-Wihéries
  - Montignies-Saint-Christophe
  - Solre-sur-Sambre
- Esneux
  - Esneux
  - Tilff
- Estaimpuis
  - Estaimpuis
  - Bailleul
  - Estaimbourg
  - Évregnies
  - Leers-Nord
  - Néchin
  - Saint-Léger
- Estinnes
  - Croix-lez-Rouveroy
  - Estinnes-au-Mont
  - Estinnes-au-Val
  - Faurœulx
  - Haulchin
  - Peissant
  - Rouveroy
  - Vellereille-les-Brayeux
  - Vellereille-le-Sec
- Étalle
  - Étalle
  - Buzenol
  - Chantemelle
  - Sainte-Marie
  - Vance
  - Villers-sur-Semois
- Eupen
  - Eupen
  - Kettenis

== F ==
- Faimes
  - Faimes (1970)
    - Borlez
    - Celles
    - Les Waleffes
  - Aineffe
  - Viemme
- Farciennes
  - Farciennes
  - Pironchamps
- Fauvillers
  - Fauvillers
  - Hollange
  - Tintange
- Fernelmont
  - Bierwart
  - Cortil-Wodon
  - Forville
  - Franc-Waret
  - Hemptinne
  - Hingeon
  - Marchovelette
  - Noville-les-Bois
  - Pontillas
  - Tillier
- Ferrières
  - Ferrières
  - My
  - Vieuxville
  - Werbomont
  - Xhoris
- Fexhe-le-Haut-Clocher
  - Fexhe-le-Haut-Clocher
  - Freloux
  - Noville
  - Roloux
  - Voroux-Goreux
- Flémalle
  - Awirs (1964)
    - Awirs
    - Gleixhe
  - Flémalle-Grande
  - Flémalle-Haute (1969)
    - Chokier
    - Flémalle-Haute
  - Ivoz-Ramet
  - Mons-lez-Liège
- Fléron
  - Fléron
  - Magnée
  - Retinne
  - Romsée
- Fleurus
  - Fleurus
  - Brye
  - Heppignies
  - Lambusart
  - Saint-Amand
  - Wagnelée
  - Wanfercée-Baulet
  - Wangenies
- Flobecq
- Floreffe
  - Floreffe
  - Floriffoux
  - Franière
  - Soye
- Florennes
  - Florennes
  - Corenne
  - Flavion
  - Hanzinelle
  - Hanzinne
  - Hemptinne
  - Morialmé
  - Morville
  - Rosée
  - Saint-Aubin
  - Thy-le-Bauduin
- Florenville
  - Florenville
  - Chassepierre
  - Fontenoille
  - Lacuisine
  - Muno
  - Sainte-Cécile
  - Villers-devant-Orval
- Fontaine-l'Évêque
  - Fontaine-l'Évêque
  - Forchies-la-Marche
  - Leernes
- Fosses-la-Ville
  - Fosses-la-Ville
  - Aisemont
  - Le Roux
  - Sart-Eustache
  - Sart-Saint-Laurent
  - Vitrival
- Frameries
  - Frameries
  - Eugies
  - La Bouverie
  - Noirchain
  - Sars-la-Bruyère
- Frasnes-lez-Anvaing
  - Anvaing (1932)
    - Anvaing
    - Ellignies-lez-Frasnes
  - Arc-Wattripont (1971)
    - Arc-Ainières
    - Wattripont
  - Buissenal
  - Dergneau
  - Forest
  - Frasnes-lez-Buissenal
  - Hacquegnies
  - Herquegies
  - Moustier
  - Oeudeghien
  - Saint-Sauveur
- Froidchapelle
  - Froid-Chapelle (1964)
    - Froid-Chapelle
    - Fourbechies
  - Boussu-lez-Walcourt
  - Erpion
  - Vergnies

== G ==
- Gedinne
  - Gedinne
  - Bourseigne-Neuve
  - Bourseigne-Vieille
  - Houdremont
  - Louette-Saint-Denis
  - Louette-Saint-Pierre
  - Malvoisin
  - Patignies
  - Rienne
  - Sart-Custinne
  - Vencimont
  - Willerzie
- Geer
  - Geer
  - Boëlhe
  - Darion
  - Hollogne-sur-Geer
  - Lens-Saint-Servais
  - Ligney
  - Omal
- Gembloux
  - Gembloux (1964)
    - Gembloux
    - Ernage
    - Grand-Manil
    - Lonzée
    - Sauvenière
  - Beuzet
  - Bossière
  - Bothey
  - Corroy-le-Château
  - Grand-Leez
  - Isnes
  - Mazy
- Genappe
  - Genappe
  - Baisy-Thy
  - Bousval
  - Glabais
  - Houtain-le-Val
  - Loupoigne
  - Vieux-Genappe
  - Ways
- Gerpinnes
  - Gerpinnes
  - Acoz
  - Gougnies
  - Joncret
  - Loverval
  - Villers-Poterie
- Gesves
  - Gesves
  - Faulx-les-Tombes
  - Haltinne
  - Mozet
  - Sorée
- Gouvy
  - Beho
  - Bovigny
  - Cherain
  - Limerlé
  - Montleban
- Grâce-Hollogne
  - Grâce-Hollogne (1970)
    - Grâce-Berleur
    - Hollogne-aux-Pierres
  - Bierset
  - Horion-Hozémont
  - Velroux
- Grez-Doiceau
  - Grez-Doiceau
  - Archennes
  - Biez
  - Bossut-Gottechain
  - Nethen

== H ==
- Habay
  - Anlier
  - Habay-la-Neuve
  - Habay-la-Vieille
  - Hachy
  - Houdemont
  - Rulles
- Hamoir
  - Hamoir
  - Comblain-Fairon
  - Filot
- Hamois
  - Hamois
  - Achet
  - Emptinne
  - Mohiville
  - Natoye
  - Schaltin
  - Scy
- Ham-sur-Heure-Nalinnes
  - Ham-sur-Heure
  - Cour-sur-Heure
  - Jamioulx
  - Marbaix-la-Tour
  - Nalinnes
- Hannut
  - Hannut (1970)
    - Hannut
    - Abolens
    - Avernas-le-Bauduin
    - Bertrée
    - Blehen
    - Cras-Avernas
    - Crehen
    - Lens-Saint-Remy
    - Poucet
    - Villers-le-Peuplier
  - Avin
  - Grand-Hallet (1964)
    - Grand-Hallet
    - Petit-Hallet
    - Wansin
  - Merdorp
  - Moxhe
  - Thisnes
  - Trognée
- Hastière
  - Agimont
  - Blaimont
  - Hastière-Lavaux
  - Hastière-par-delà
  - Heer
  - Hermeton-sur-Meuse
  - Waulsort
- Havelange
  - Havelange
  - Barvaux-Condroz
  - Flostoy
  - Jeneffe
  - Maffe
  - Méan
  - Miécret
  - Porcheresse
  - Verlée
- Hélécine
  - Linsmeau
  - Neerheylissem
  - Opheylissem
- Hensies
  - Hensies
  - Hainin
  - Montrœul-sur-Haine
  - Thulin
- Herbeumont
  - Herbeumont
  - Saint-Médard
  - Straimont
- Héron
  - Héron
  - Couthuin
  - Lavoir
  - Waret-l'Évêque
- Herstal
  - Herstal
  - Liers
  - Milmort
  - Vottem
- Herve
  - Herve
  - Battice
  - Bolland
  - Chaineux
  - Charneux
  - Grand-Rechain
  - Julémont
  - Xhendelesse
- Honnelles
  - Angre
  - Angreau
  - Athis
  - Autreppe
  - Erquennes
  - Fayt-le-Franc
  - Marchipont
  - Montignies-sur-Roc
  - Onnezies
  - Roisin
- Hotton
  - Hotton
  - Fronville
  - Hampteau
  - Marenne
- Houffalize
  - Houffalize
  - Mabompré
  - Mont
  - Nadrin
  - Tailles
  - Tavigny
  - Wibrin
- Houyet
  - Houyet
  - Celles
  - Ciergnon
  - Custinne
  - Finnevaux
  - Hour
  - Hulsonniaux
  - Mesnil-Église
  - Mesnil-Saint-Blaise
  - Wanlin
- Huy
  - Huy
  - Ben-Ahin
  - Tihange (1951)
    - Tihange
    - Neuville-sous-Huy

== I ==
- Incourt
  - Incourt
  - Glimes
  - Opprebais
  - Piétrebais
  - Roux-Miroir
- Ittre
  - Ittre
  - Haut-Ittre
  - Virginal-Samme

== J ==
- Jalhay
  - Jalhay
  - Sart-lez-Spa
- Jemeppe-sur-Sambre
  - Jemeppe-sur-Sambre
  - Balâtre
  - Ham-sur-Sambre
  - Mornimont
  - Moustier-sur-Sambre
  - Onoz
  - Saint-Martin
  - Spy
- Jodoigne
  - Jodoigne
  - Dongelberg
  - Jauchelette
  - Jodoigne-Souveraine
  - Lathuy
  - Mélin
  - Piétrain
  - Saint-Jean-Geest
  - Saint-Remy-Geest
  - Zétrud-Lumay
- Juprelle
  - Juprelle
  - Fexhe-Slins
  - Lantin
  - Paifve
  - Slins
  - Villers-Saint-Siméon
  - Voroux-lez-Liers
  - Wihogne
- Jurbise
  - Jurbise
  - Erbaut
  - Erbisœul
  - Herchies
  - Masnuy-Saint-Jean
  - Masnuy-Saint-Pierre

== L ==
- La Bruyère
  - Bovesse
  - Émines
  - Meux
  - Rhisnes
  - Saint-Denis
  - Villers-lez-Heest
  - Warisoulx
- La Hulpe
- La Louvière
  - La Louvière
  - Boussoit
  - Haine-Saint-Paul
  - Haine-Saint-Pierre
  - Houdeng-Aimeries
  - Houdeng-Gœgnies
  - Maurage
  - Saint-Vaast
  - Strépy-Bracquegnies
  - Trivières
- La Roche-en-Ardenne
  - La Roche-en-Ardenne
  - Beausaint
  - Halleux
  - Hives
  - Ortho
  - Samrée
- Lasne
  - Couture-Saint-Germain
  - Lasne-Chapelle-Saint-Lambert
  - Maransart
  - Ohain
  - Plancenoit
- Léglise
  - Léglise
  - Assenois
  - Ébly
  - Mellier
  - Witry
- Lens
  - Lens
  - Bauffe
  - Cambron-Saint-Vincent
  - Lombise
  - Montignies-lez-Lens
- Le Rœulx
  - Le Rœulx
  - Mignault
  - Thieu
  - Ville-sur-Haine (1964)
    - Ville-sur-Haine
    - Gottignies
- Les Bons Villers
  - Frasnes-lez-Gosselies
  - Mellet
  - Rèves
  - Villers-Perwin
  - Wayaux
- Lessines
  - Lessines
  - Bois-de-Lessines
  - Deux-Acren
  - Ghoy
  - Ogy
  - Ollignies
  - Papignies (1964)
    - Papignies
    - Wannebecq
- Leuze-en-Hainaut
  - Leuze
  - Blicquy
  - Chapelle-à-Oie
  - Chapelle-à-Wattines
  - Gallaix
  - Grandmetz
  - Pipaix
  - Thieulain
  - Tourpes
  - Willaupuis
- Libin
  - Libin
  - Anloy
  - Ochamps
  - Redu
  - Smuid
  - Transinne
  - Villance
- Libramont-Chevigny
  - Libramont
  - Bras
  - Freux
  - Moircy
  - Recogne
  - Remagne
  - Sainte-Marie-Chevigny
  - Saint-Pierre
- Liège
  - Liège
  - Angleur
  - Bressoux
  - Chênée
  - Glain
  - Grivegnée
  - Jupille-sur-Meuse
  - Rocourt
  - Wandre
- Lierneux
  - Lierneux
  - Arbrefontaine
  - Bra
- Limbourg
  - Limbourg
  - Bilstain
  - Goé
- Lincent
  - Lincent
  - Pellaines
  - Racour
- Lobbes
  - Lobbes
  - Bienne-lez-Happart
  - Mont-Sainte-Geneviève
  - Sars-la-Buissière
- Lontzen
  - Lontzen
  - Herbesthal
  - Walhorn

== M ==
- Malmedy
  - Malmedy
  - Bellevaux-Ligneuville
  - Bévercé
- Manage
  - Manage
  - Bois-d'Haine
  - Fayt-lez-Manage
  - La Hestre (1970)
    - La Hestre
    - Bellecourt
- Manhay
  - Dochamps
  - Grandménil
  - Harre
  - Malempré
  - Odeigne
  - Vaux-Chavanne
- Marche-en-Famenne
  - Marche-en-Famenne
  - Aye
  - Hargimont
  - Humain
  - On
  - Roy
  - Waha
- Marchin
  - Marchin
  - Vyle-et-Tharoul
- Martelange
- Meix-devant-Virton
  - Meix-devant-Virton
  - Gérouville
  - Robelmont
  - Sommethonne
  - Villers-la-Loue
- Merbes-le-Château
  - Merbes-le-Château
  - Fontaine-Valmont
  - Labuissière
  - Merbes-Sainte-Marie
- Messancy
  - Messancy
  - Habergy
  - Hondelange
  - Sélange
  - Wolkrange
- Mettet
  - Mettet
  - Biesme
  - Biesmerée
  - Ermeton-sur-Biert
  - Furnaux
  - Graux
  - Oret
  - Saint-Gérard
  - Stave
- Modave
  - Modave (1952)
    - Modave
    - Linchet
  - Outrelouxhe
  - Strée
  - Vierset-Barse
- Momignies
  - Momignies
  - Beauwelz
  - Forge-Philippe
  - Macon
  - Macquenoise
  - Monceau-Imbrechies
  - Seloignes
- Mons
  - Mons (1972)
    - Mons
    - Cuesmes
    - Ghlin
    - Hyon
    - Nimy
    - Obourg
  - Ciply
  - Harmignies
  - Harveng
  - Havré
  - Jemappes
    - Flénu
    - Jemappes
  - Maisières
  - Mesvin
  - Nouvelles
  - Saint-Denis
  - Saint-Symphorien
  - Spiennes
  - Villers-Saint-Ghislain
- Mont-de-l'Enclus
  - Amougies
  - Anserœul
  - Orroir
  - Russeignies
- Montigny-le-Tilleul
  - Montigny-le-Tilleul
  - Landelies
- Mont-Saint-Guibert
  - Mont-Saint-Guibert
  - Corbais
  - Hévillers
- Morlanwelz
  - Morlanwelz-Mariemont
  - Carnières
  - Mont-Sainte-Aldegonde
- Mouscron
  - Mouscron
  - Dottignies
  - Herseaux
  - Luingne
- Musson
  - Musson
  - Mussy-la-Ville

== N ==
- Namur
  - Namur
  - Beez
  - Belgrade
  - Boninne
  - Bouge
  - Champion
  - Cognelée
  - Daussoulx
  - Dave
  - Erpent
  - Flawinne
  - Gelbressée
  - Jambes
  - Lives-sur-Meuse
  - Loyers
  - Malonne
  - Marche-les-Dames
  - Naninne
  - Saint-Marc
  - Saint-Servais
  - Suarlée
  - Temploux
  - Vedrin
  - Wépion
  - Wierde
- Nandrin
  - Nandrin
  - Saint-Séverin
  - Villers-le-Temple
  - Yernée-Fraineux
- Nassogne
  - Nassogne
  - Ambly
  - Bande
  - Forrières
  - Grune
  - Harsin
  - Lesterny
  - Masbourg
- Neufchâteau
  - Neufchâteau
  - Grandvoir
  - Grapfontaine
  - Hamipré
  - Longlier
  - Tournay
- Neupré
  - Éhein
  - Neuville-en-Condroz
  - Plainevaux
  - Rotheux-Rimière
- Nivelles
  - Nivelles
  - Baulers
  - Bornival
  - Monstreux
  - Thines

== O ==
- Ohey
  - Ohey
  - Évelette
  - Goesnes
  - Haillot
  - Jallet
  - Perwez
- Olne
- Onhaye
  - Onhaye
  - Anthée
  - Falaën
  - Gerin
  - Serville
  - Sommière
  - Weillen
- Oreye
  - Oreye
  - Bergilers
  - Grandville
  - Lens-sur-Geer
  - Otrange
- Orp-Jauche
  - Jandrain-Jandrenouille
  - Jauche (1970)
    - Jauche
    - Énines
    - Folx-les-Caves
  - Marilles
  - Noduwez
  - Orp-le-Grand
- Ottignies-Louvain-la-Neuve
  - Céroux-Mousty
  - Limelette
  - Louvain-la-Neuve
  - Ottignies
- Ouffet
  - Ouffet
  - Ellemelle
  - Warzée
- Oupeye
  - Oupeye
  - Haccourt
  - Hermalle-sous-Argenteau
  - Hermée
  - Heure-le-Romain
  - Houtain-Saint-Siméon
  - Vivegnis

== P ==
- Paliseul
  - Paliseul
  - Carlsbourg
  - Fays-les-Veneurs
  - Framont, Wallonia
  - Maissin
  - Nollevaux
  - Offagne
  - Opont
- Pecq
  - Pecq (before fusion)
  - Esquelmes
  - Hérinnes
  - Obigies
  - Warcoing
- Pepinster
  - Pepinster (1964)
    - Pepinster
    - Cornesse
  - Soiron
  - Wegnez
- Péruwelz
  - Péruwelz
  - Baugnies
  - Bon-Secours
  - Braffe
  - Brasménil
  - Bury
  - Callenelle
  - Roucourt
  - Wasmes-Audemez-Briffœil
  - Wiers
- Perwez
  - Perwez
  - Malèves-Sainte-Marie-Wastines
  - Orbais
  - Thorembais-les-Béguines
  - Thorembais-Saint-Trond
- Philippeville
  - Philippeville
  - Fagnolle
  - Franchimont
  - Jamagne
  - Jamiolle
  - Merlemont
  - Neuville
  - Omezée
  - Roly
  - Romedenne
  - Samart
  - Sart-en-Fagne
  - Sautour
  - Surice
  - Villers-en-Fagne
  - Villers-le-Gambon
  - Vodecée
- Plombières
  - Gemmenich
  - Hombourg
  - Montzen
  - Moresnet
  - Sippenaeken
- Pont-à-Celles
  - Pont-à-Celles
  - Buzet
  - Luttre (1964)
    - Luttre
    - Liberchies
  - Obaix
  - Thiméon
  - Viesville
- Profondeville
  - Profondeville
  - Arbre
  - Bois-de-Villers
  - Lesve
  - Lustin
  - Rivière

== Q ==
- Quaregnon
  - Quaregnon
  - Wasmuel
- Quévy
  - Asquillies
  - Aulnois
  - Blaregnies
  - Bougnies
  - Genly
  - Givry
  - Gœgnies-Chaussée
  - Havay
  - Quévy-le-Grand
  - Quévy-le-Petit
- Quiévrain
  - Quiévrain
  - Audregnies
  - Baisieux

== R ==
- Raeren
  - Raeren
  - Eynatten
  - Hauset
- Ramillies
  - Autre-Église
  - Gérompont (1970)
    - Bomal
    - Geest-Gérompont-Petit-Rosière
  - Mont-Saint-André
  - Grand-Rosière-Hottomont
  - Huppaye
  - Ramillies-Offus
- Rebecq
  - Bierghes - which was Wisbecq, taken from Saintes
  - Quenast
  - Rebecq-Rognon
- Remicourt
  - Remicourt
  - Hodeige
  - Momalle
  - Pousset
- Rendeux
  - Rendeux
  - Beffe
  - Hodister
  - Marcourt
- Rixensart
  - Rixensart
  - Genval
  - Rosières
- Rochefort
  - Rochefort
  - Ave-et-Auffe
  - Buissonville
  - Éprave
  - Han-sur-Lesse
  - Jemelle
  - Lavaux-Sainte-Anne
  - Lessive
  - Mont-Gauthier
  - Villers-sur-Lesse
  - Wavreille
- Rouvroy
  - Dampicourt
  - Harnoncourt
  - Lamorteau
  - Torgny (village)
- Rumes
  - Rumes
  - La Glanerie
  - Taintignies

== S ==
- Sainte-Ode
  - Sainte-Ode
  - Amberloup
  - Lavacherie
  - Tillet
- Saint-Georges-sur-Meuse
- Saint-Ghislain
  - Saint-Ghislain
  - Baudour
  - Hautrage
  - Neufmaison, Wallonia
  - Sirault
  - Tertre
  - Villerot
- Saint-Hubert
  - Saint-Hubert
  - Arville
  - Awenne
  - Hatrival
  - Mirwart
  - Vesqueville
- Saint-Léger
  - Saint-Léger
  - Châtillon
  - Meix-le-Tige
- Saint-Nicolas
  - Saint-Nicolas
  - Montegnée
  - Tilleur
- Saint-Vith (Sankt-Vith)
  - Saint-Vith
  - Crombach
  - Lommersweiler
  - Recht
  - Schönberg
- Sambreville
  - Arsimont
  - Auvelais
  - Falisolle
  - Keumiée
  - Moignelée
  - Tamines
  - Velaine
- Seneffe
  - Seneffe
  - Arquennes
  - Familleureux
  - Feluy
  - Petit-Rœulx-lez-Nivelles
- Seraing
  - Seraing
  - Boncelles
  - Jemeppe-sur-Meuse
  - Ougrée
- Silly
  - Silly
  - Bassilly
  - Fouleng
  - Gondregnies
  - Graty
  - Hellebecq
  - Hoves
  - Thoricourt
- Sivry-Rance
  - Grandrieu
  - Montbliart
  - Rance
  - Sautin
  - Sivry
- Soignies
  - Soignies
  - Casteau
  - Chaussée-Notre-Dame-Louvignies
  - Horrues
  - Naast
  - Neufvilles
  - Thieusies
- Sombreffe
  - Sombreffe
  - Boignée
  - Ligny
  - Tongrinne
- Somme-Leuze
  - Somme-Leuze
  - Baillonville
  - Bonsin
  - Heure
  - Hogne
  - Nettinne
  - Noiseux
  - Sinsin
  - Waillet
- Soumagne
  - Soumagne
  - Ayeneux
  - Cerexhe-Heuseux
  - Évegnée-Tignée (1949)
    - Évegnée
    - Tignée
  - Mélen
  - Micheroux
- Spa
- Sprimont
  - Sprimont
  - Dolembreux
  - Gomzé-Andoumont
  - Louveigné
  - Rouvreux
- Stavelot
  - Stavelot
  - Francorchamps
- Stoumont
  - Stoumont
  - Chevron
  - La Gleize
  - Lorcé
  - Rahier

== T ==
- Tellin
  - Tellin
  - Bure
  - Grupont
  - Resteigne
- Tenneville
  - Tenneville
  - Champlon
  - Erneuville
- Theux
  - Theux
  - La Reid
  - Polleur
- Thimister-Clermont
  - Clermont (Thimister)
  - Thimister
- Thuin
  - Thuin
  - Biercée
  - Biesme-sous-Thuin
  - Donstiennes
  - Gozée
  - Leers-et-Fosteau
  - Ragnies
  - Thuillies
- Tinlot
  - Abée
  - Fraiture
  - Ramelot
  - Seny
  - Soheit-Tinlot
- Tintigny
  - Tintigny
  - Bellefontaine
  - Rossignol
  - Saint-Vincent
- Tournai
  - Tournai
  - Barry
  - Beclers
  - Blandain
  - Chercq
  - Ere
  - Esplechin
  - Froidmont
  - Froyennes
  - Gaurain-Ramecroix
  - Havinnes
  - Hertain
  - Kain
  - Lamain
  - Marquain
  - Maulde
  - Melles
  - Mont-Saint-Aubert
  - Mourcourt
  - Orcq
  - Quartes
  - Ramegnies-Chin
  - Rumillies
  - Saint-Maur
  - Templeuve
  - Thimougies
  - Vaulx
  - Vezon
  - Warchin
  - Willemeau
- Trois-Ponts
  - Trois-Ponts (1970)
    - Fosse
    - Wanne
  - Basse-Bodeux
- Trooz
  - Forêt
  - Fraipont
  - Nessonvaux
- Tubize
  - Tubize (1970)
    - Tubize
    - Oisquercq
  - Clabecq
  - Saintes - a part of which was (Wisbecq) ceded to Rebecq

== V ==
- Vaux-sur-Sûre
  - Hompré
  - Juseret
  - Sibret
  - Vaux-sur-Sûre (1970)
    - Morhet
    - Nives
    - Vaux-lez-Rosières
- Verlaine
  - Verlaine
  - Bodegnée
  - Chapon-Seraing
  - Seraing-le-Château
- Verviers
  - Verviers
  - Ensival
  - Heusy
  - Lambermont
  - Petit-Rechain
  - Stembert
- Vielsalm
  - Vielsalm
  - Bihain
  - Grand-Halleux
  - Petit-Thier
- Villers-la-Ville
  - Villers-la-Ville
  - Marbais
  - Mellery
  - Sart-Dames-Avelines
  - Tilly
- Villers-le-Bouillet
  - Villers-le-Bouillet
  - Fize-Fontaine
  - Vaux-et-Borset
  - Vieux-Waleffe
  - Warnant-Dreye
- Viroinval
  - Dourbes
  - Le Mesnil
  - Mazée
  - Nismes
  - Oignies-en-Thiérache
  - Olloy-sur-Viroin
  - Treignes
  - Vierves-sur-Viroin
- Virton
  - Virton
  - Bleid
  - Ethe
  - Latour
  - Ruette
  - Saint-Mard
- Visé
  - Visé
  - Argenteau
  - Cheratte
  - Lanaye
  - Lixhe
  - Richelle
- Vresse-sur-Semois
  - Vresse (1964)
    - Vresse
    - Laforêt
  - Alle (1964)
    - Alle
    - Chairière
    - Mouzaive
  - Bohan (1964)
    - Bohan
    - Membre
  - Nafraiture
  - Orchimont
  - Sugny, Belgium (1964)
    - Sugny
    - Bagimont
    - Pussemange

== W ==
- Waimes
  - Waimes
  - Faymonville
  - Robertville
- Walcourt
  - Walcourt
  - Berzée
  - Castillon
  - Chastrès
  - Clermont
  - Fontenelle
  - Fraire
  - Gourdinne
  - Laneffe
  - Pry
  - Rognée
  - Somzée
  - Tarcienne
  - Thy-le-Château
  - Vogenée
  - Yves-Gomezée
- Walhain
  - Walhain-Saint-Paul
  - Nil-Saint-Vincent-Saint-Martin
  - Tourinnes-Saint-Lambert
- Wanze
  - Wanze
  - Antheit
  - Bas-Oha
  - Huccorgne
  - Moha
  - Vinalmont
- Waremme
  - Waremme
  - Bettincourt
  - Bleret
  - Bovenistier
  - Grand-Axhe
  - Lantremange
  - Oleye
- Wasseiges
  - Wasseiges
  - Acosse
  - Ambresin
  - Meeffe
- Waterloo
  - Waterloo (+ Hameau du Chenois, ceded to Braine-l'Alleud)
- Wavre
  - Wavre
  - Bierges
  - Limal
- Welkenraedt
  - Welkenraedt
  - Henri-Chapelle
- Wellin
  - Wellin
  - Chanly
  - Halma
  - Lomprez
  - Sohier

== Y ==
- Yvoir
  - Yvoir
  - Dorinne
  - Durnal
  - Évrehailles
  - Godinne
  - Houx, Belgium
  - Mont
  - Mont-Godinne
  - Purnode
  - Spontin

== See also ==
- List of municipalities of Belgium
- List of cities in Wallonia
