= Siege of Namur (1914) =

1914 battle of the German invasion of Belgium during WWI

- Part of the Western Front of the First World War
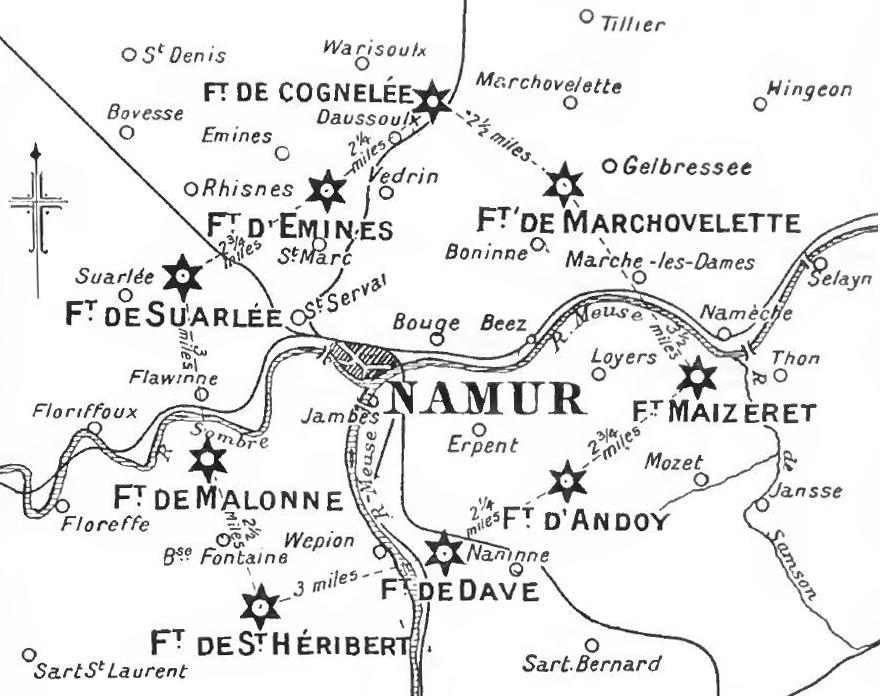
- Map of the city and Fortified Position of Namur
Date	20–25 August 1914
Location	Namur, Belgium 50°28′N 04°52′E
Result	German victory

Belligerents
German Empire; Austria-Hungary	Belgium; France

Commanders and leaders
Karl von Bülow; Max von Hausen	Édouard Michel

Strength
107,000	35,000

Casualties and losses
300 killed, 600 wounded or missing	c. 15,000; (including 6,700 POW)
- Namur in the Arrondissement of Namur, Belgium

The siege of Namur (French: siège de Namur) was a battle between Belgian and German forces around the fortified city of Namur during the First World War. Namur was defended by a ring of modern fortresses, known as the Fortified Position of Namur and guarded by the 4th Division of the Belgian Army. The purpose of the fortified Belgian cities was to delay an invasion force until troops from the states guaranteeing Belgian independence came to their aid. The French Fifth Army planned to counter-attack while the Germans were besieging Namur.

The German 2nd Army arrived in force on 20 August 1914 and used the experience gained from the Battle of Liège (4–16 August). The Germans did not attempt a coup de main but waited until the next day and bombarded the forts using super-heavy siege artillery and four batteries on loan from Austria-Hungary. The forts were destroyed by the bombardment, some being demolished by conventional heavy artillery rather than the siege guns, due to flaws in the concrete protection encasing the forts. In contrast to Liège, the Germans reduced the forts while suffering very few casualties.

The defeat of the Fifth Army at the Battle of Charleroi on 21 August prevented the French from advancing further and only one regiment reached Namur as reinforcement. As it became clear that additional relief forces would not arrive, on 23 August survivors of the Belgian 4th Division withdrew southwards to join the Fifth Army near Saint-Gérard. The last of the Namur forts surrendered on 25 August. The 4th Division troops eventually joined the Belgian field army at Antwerp during its siege.

== Background ==
=== Strategic developments ===
==== Belgium ====
Belgian military planning was based on an assumption that other powers would eject an invader but the likelihood of a German invasion did not lead to France and Britain being seen as allies or for the Belgian government intending to do more than protect its independence. The Anglo-French Entente (1904) had led the Belgians to perceive that the British attitude to Belgium had changed and that it was seen as a British protectorate. A General Staff was formed in 1910 but the Chef d'État-Major Général de l'Armée, Lieutenant-Général Harry Jungbluth was retired on 30 June 1912 and not replaced until May 1914 by Lieutenant-General Chevalier de Selliers de Moranville, who began planning for the concentration of the army and met railway officials on 29 July.

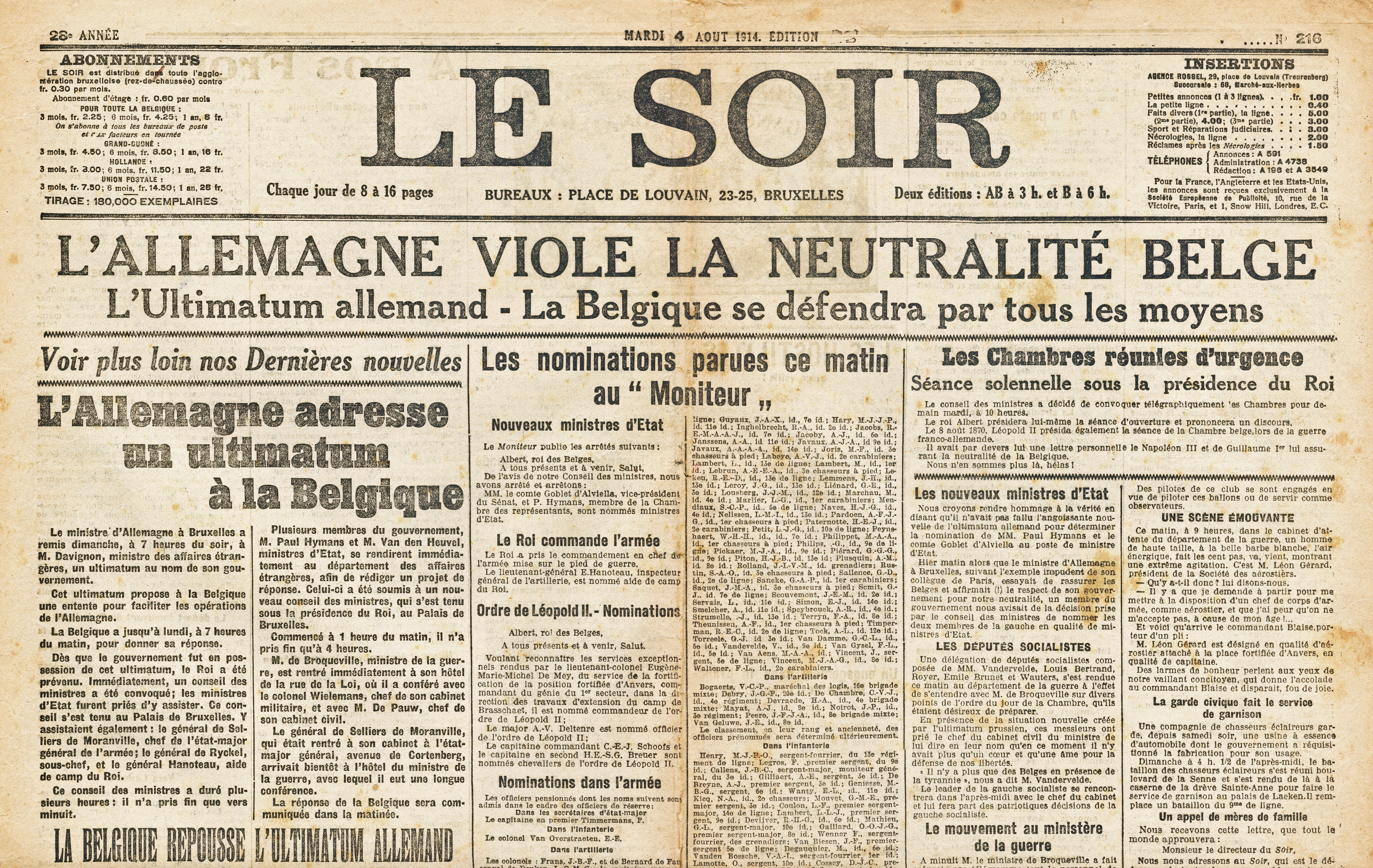
Headline in Le Soir, 4 August 1914

Belgian troops were to be massed in central Belgium, in front of the National redoubt of Belgium ready to face any border, while the Fortified Position of Liège and Fortified Position of Namur were left to secure the frontiers. On mobilization, the King became Commander-in-Chief and chose where the army was to concentrate. Amid the disruption of the new rearmament plan, the disorganised and poorly trained Belgian soldiers would benefit from a central position, to delay contact with an invader but it would also need fortifications for defence, which were on the frontier. A school of thought wanted a return to a frontier deployment in line with French theories of the offensive. Belgian plans became a compromise in which the field army concentrated behind the Gete river with two divisions forward at Liège and Namur.

==== Germany ====
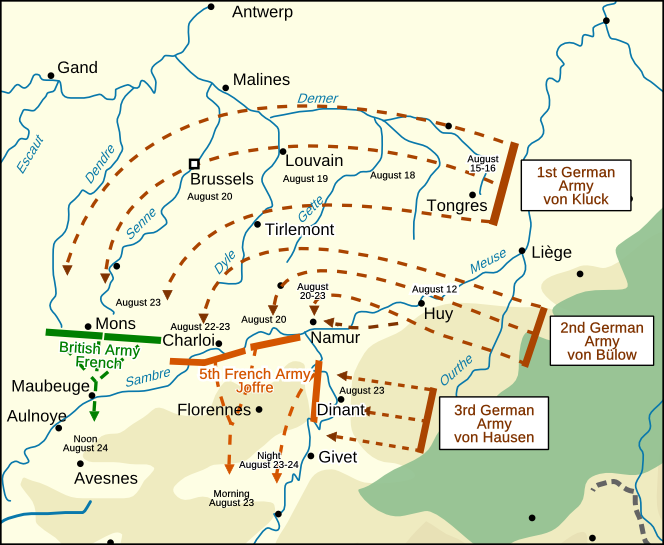
Map showing the German advance through Belgium, after the Battle of Liège in early August 1914

German strategy had given priority to offensive operations against France and a defensive posture against Russia since 1891. German planning was determined by numerical inferiority, the speed of mobilisation and concentration and the effect of the vast increase of the power of modern weapons. Frontal attacks were expected to be costly and protracted, leading to limited success, particularly after the French and Russians modernised their fortifications on the frontiers with Germany. Alfred von Schlieffen, Chief of the Imperial German General Staff) from 1891–1906, devised a plan to evade the French frontier fortifications with an offensive on the northern flank, which would have a local numerical superiority and obtain rapidly a decisive victory. By 1898–1899, such a manoeuvre was intended to pass swiftly through Belgium, between Antwerp and Namur and threaten Paris from the north.

Helmuth von Moltke the Younger succeeded Schlieffen in 1906 and was less certain that the French would conform to German assumptions. Moltke adapted the deployment and concentration plan to accommodate an attack in the centre or an enveloping attack from both flanks as variants, by adding divisions to the left flank opposite the French frontier, from the c. 1,700,000 men which were expected to be mobilised in the Westheer (western army). The main German force would still advance through Belgium to attack southwards into France, the French armies would be enveloped on their left and pressed back over the Meuse, Aisne, Somme, Oise, Marne and Seine rivers, unable to withdraw into central France. The French would either be annihilated by the manoeuvre from the north or it would create conditions for victory in the centre or in Lorraine on the common border.

=== Tactical developments ===
==== Namur forts ====
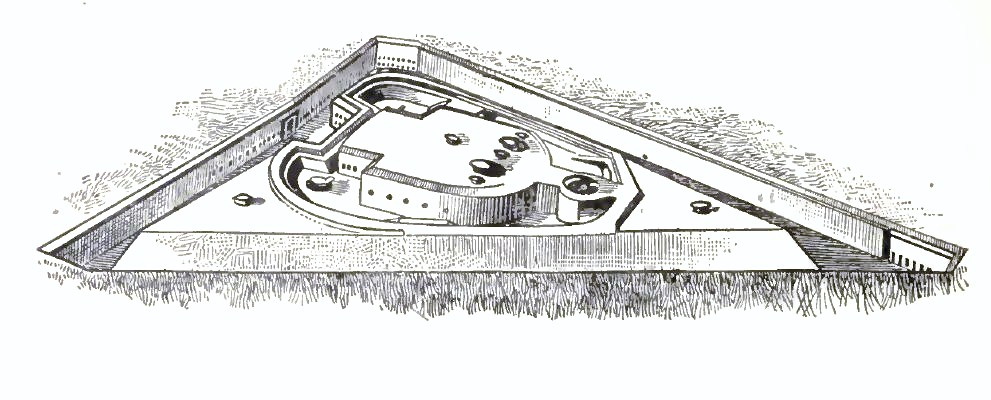
Triangular Brialmont fort, 1914

The Meuse valley was a route by which France or Germany could be invaded and after the Franco-Prussian War, General Henri Alexis Brialmont fortified the valley at Liège and Namur, to deter France and Germany from violating Belgian sovereignty. The Fortified Position of Namur (FPN) was built from 1888–1892, about 7 kilometres (4.3 mi) from the centre of Namur, to a standard design of triangular and quadrilateral shapes, to minimize the number of defensive batteries in the fort ditches, with the point facing outwards. On the left bank of the Meuse lay the modernised forts of Fort de Malonne, Fort de Saint-Héribert and Fort de Suarlée, the unmodernised Fort d'Emines and Fort de Cognelée and the modernized Fort de Marchovelette. On the right bank were Fort de Maizeret, Fort d'Andoy and Fort de Dave, all modernized. The obsolete Citadel of Namur in the town became redundant.

The forts were built of non-reinforced concrete but this could only be poured in daylight, which caused weak joints between each pour. A citadel was built and covered by 3–4 metres (9.8–13.1 ft) of concrete; caserne walls which were less vulnerable, had concrete of 1.5 metres (4.9 ft) thickness, inside a defended ditch 8 metres (26 ft) wide. The entrance had a long access ramp at the rear facing Namur, protected by a tambour with gun embrasures perpendicular to the entry, a rolling drawbridge retracting laterally over a 3.5 metres (11 ft) pit equipped with grenade launchers, an entrance grille and a 57-millimetre (2.2 in) gun firing along the axis of the gate. The forts at Liège and Namur had 171 heavy guns, with each fort equipped with 5–8 Krupp guns of 120-millimetre (4.7 in), 150-millimetre (5.9 in) and 210-millimetre (8.3 in) calibre, which were the most modern armaments available in 1888, mounted in retractable armoured steel turrets made in France, Belgium and Germany. Three smaller retractable turrets were built in the triangular forts and four in the quadrilateral forts, with 57-millimetre (2.2 in) guns for short-range defence and 6–9 more 57-millimetre (2.2 in) guns were mounted in casemates to defend the ditches.

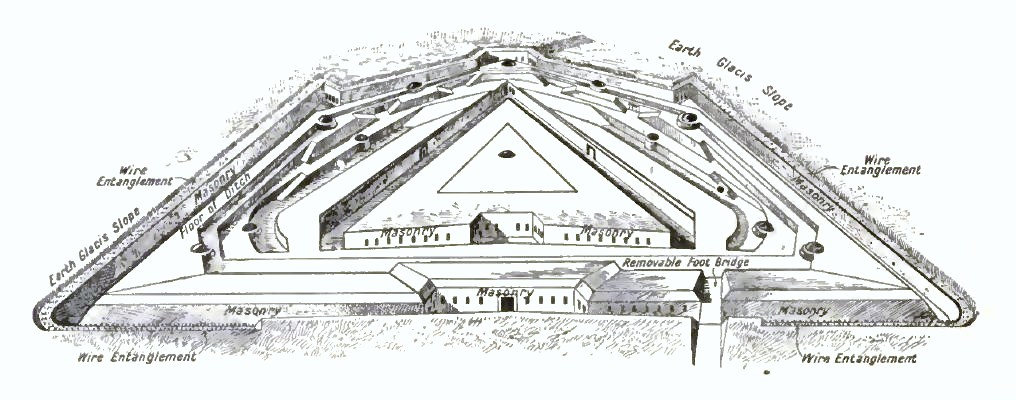
Pentagonal Brialmont fort, 1914

The forts of the FPN were built to withstand bombardment by 210-millimetre (8.3 in) artillery and were equipped with steam-powered electrical generating plant for lights, pumps and searchlights at a cost 29 million francs. The forts had a weaker side to the rear, to allow them to be recaptured by Belgian forces counter-attacking from the rear. Barracks and support facilities were built on the rear side, using the rear ditch for light and ventilation of living spaces. Provision had been made for the daily needs of the fortress troops but the latrines, showers, kitchens and the morgue had been built in the counterscarp, which could become untenable if fumes from exploding shells collected in the living quarters and support areas as the forts were ventilated naturally. Each fort had a detachment of infantry, to sortie from the fort to engage an attacker.

==== Battle of Liège, 4–16 August ====
The Battle of Liège was the first engagement in the German invasion of Belgium and the first battle of World War I. The attack on the city began on 5 August 1914 and lasted until 16 August, when the last fort was surrendered. Railways needed by the German armies in eastern Belgium, were closed during the early part of the siege and by the morning of 17 August, the German 1st, 2nd and 3rd armies were free to resume their advance to the French frontier. The Belgian field army withdrew from the Gete towards Antwerp from 18–20 August and Brussels was captured unopposed on 20 August. The siege of Liège lasted for eleven days, rather than the two days anticipated by the Germans. General Karl von Bülow the German Second Army commander, established Angriffsgruppe Namur (General Max von Gallwitz) with the Guards Reserve Corps, XI Corps taken from the 3rd Army (General Max von Hausen) and a division of the VII Reserve Corps, with c. 107,000 men that advanced on Namur on 16 August and appeared in strength before Namur on 20 August. The 3rd Army guarded the southern flank along the Meuse and the 2nd Army attacked towards Charleroi, which prevented all but one French regiment from reaching Namur to reinforce the garrison.

== Prelude ==
=== Belgian defensive preparations ===
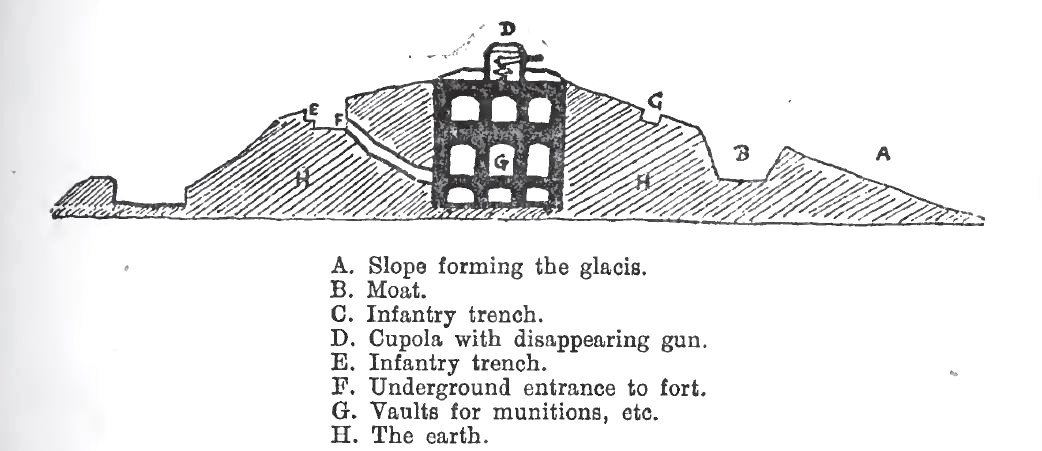
Diagram of the interior of a Brialmont fort

Namur was garrisoned by about 37,000 fortress troops and infantry of the Belgian 4th Division under the command of General Augustin Michel. The Belgians intended to hold the Fortified Position of Namur until relieved by the French Fifth Army. Belgian and German cavalry skirmished to the north of Namur on 5 August and to the south-east two days later. On 19 August the Belgian 8th Brigade at Huy blew the bridge over the Meuse and retired to Namur, as the German Guard Reserve Corps and XI Corps appeared from the east.

=== German offensive preparations ===
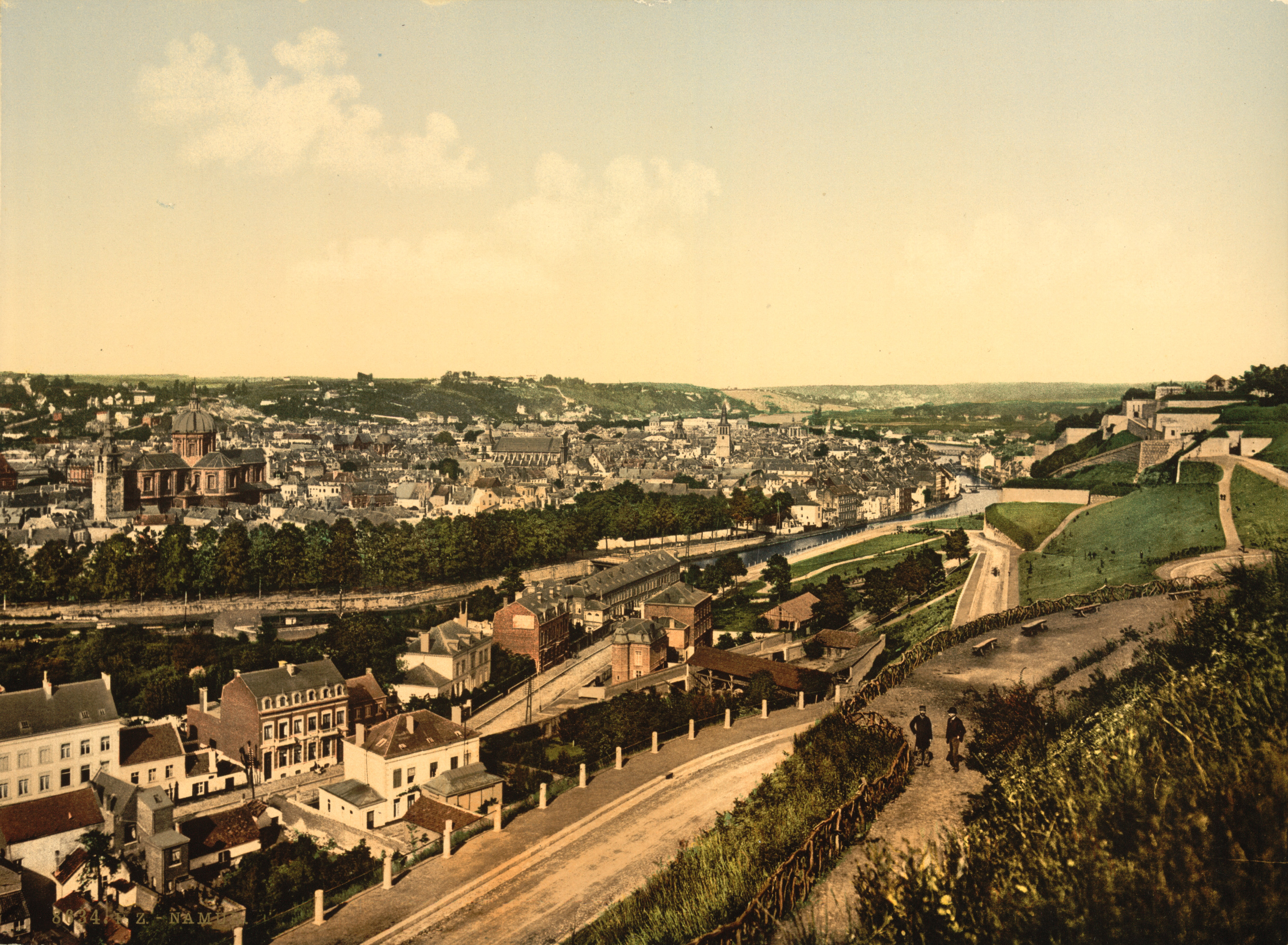
View of the city of Namur, c. 1900

Bülow ordered General Max von Gallwitz, commander of the Guard Reserve Corps, to lead the attack on Namur with Angriffsgruppe Namur, while the 3rd Army guarded against an attack by the Allies between Namur and Givet. The super-heavy artillery and engineer units from Liège were sent to Namur along the Meuse valley and the experience gained in the operation against the Fortified Position of Liège, led the attacking troops to take the shortest routes to Namur, which brought the Guard Reserve Corps to the north bank of the Meuse and the XI Corps to the south bank. Bülow arrived at the headquarters of Gallwitz on 20 August and insisted that the 1st Guard Reserve Division move further round to the north and north-west of Namur, to protect the left flank of the 2nd Army as it wheeled around the fortress.

The division was to cross the river at Andenne but "Belgian civilians" delayed the passage in street fighting. (Note: "Coercive measures" (Zwangsmassnahmen) were directed at civilians on several occasions during German military operations in Belgium, which were exploited by Allied propagandists and investigated during the war and after by commissions of varying integrity. In the 1920s and 1930s the allegations against the German army became discredited, in view of the ulterior motives of some of the investigations. In 2005 Horne and Kramer reviewed archival evidence, soldier's letters, diaries and regimental histories, to conclude that atrocities against civilians and prisoners of war had been committed in Belgium and France in 1914. The writers suggested that German military thinking assumed that civilians would conduct irregular warfare and that violence would be necessary to repress such civilian uprisings. Horne and Kramer wrote that drunkenness, indiscipline, fear and hysteria among German soldiers, combined with the memory of Francs-tireurs in the Franco-Prussian War (1870–1871) to legitimise attacks on civilians and that most German claims of civilian attacks were unfounded.) The 3rd Guard Division was delayed at Hingeon and by a Belgian counter-attack from Cognelée. On the south bank XI Corps repulsed Belgian attacks and reached its assembly areas and established a flank guard at Florée. The German artillery arrived late and so the bombardment was postponed until 21 August. The terrain on the south-east front was found to be unsuitable for an attack and the 38th Division was ordered forward to Haltinne and the 22nd Division took over the front of attack, on the south bank of the Meuse.

=== German plan of attack ===
After a reconnaissance on 19 August, Gallwitz decided that a coup de main was impossible and chose to attack the north-eastern front of the fortress with the 3rd Guard Division between Hingeon and Vezin and the eastern side by the XI Corps, with the 1st Guard Reserve Division in reserve at Andenne. The siege artillery was to be emplaced in the sectors opposite forts Marchovlette, Maizeret and Andoy. As the infantry arrived from Héron, Coutisse, Ohey and Hamois it was to assemble at 11:00 a.m., on a line from Franc to Waret, Vezin, Sclayn, Strud and Les Tombs; in the afternoon the artillery was to commence the bombardment. A plan arrived from OHL the same day, with a dossier on the forts and the garrison but Gallwitz chose to conduct the operation according to open warfare techniques rather than pre-war thinking about siege warfare. Air reconnaissance detected Belgian troops at Cognelée and pontoon bridges at Vépion and Arrêt, either side of Namur and railway traffic to the south-west heading for the fortress. The Belgians had used the time taken by the siege of Liège to build field fortifications between the forts, particularly on the most vulnerable parts of the perimeter from the north to the south-east.

== Siege ==
=== Bombardment ===
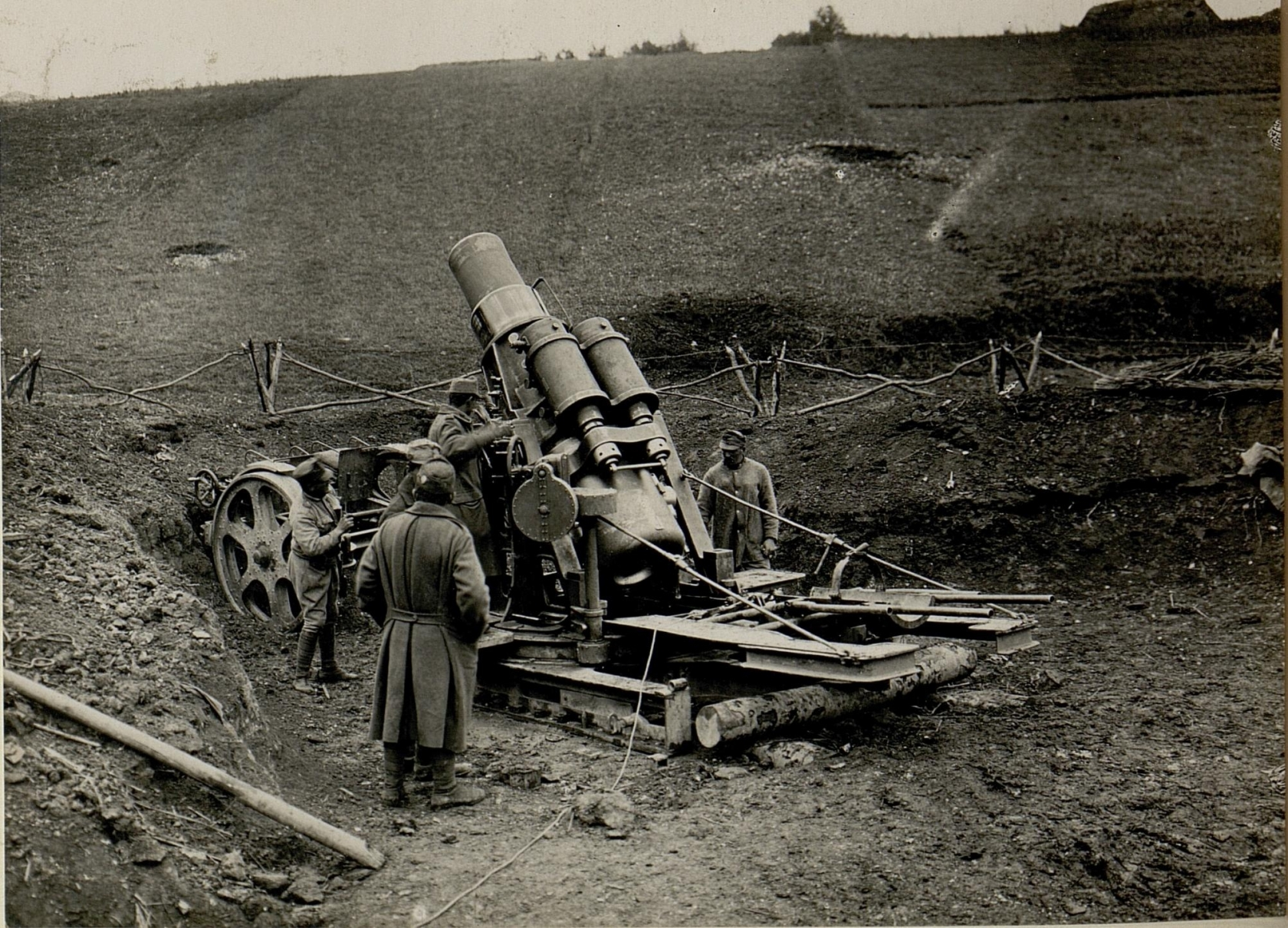
Austro-Hungarian 305 mm siege gun

The bombardment on 21 August was interrupted by fog and by noon the artillery on the north-east and south-east fronts had only fired on forts Marchovelette, Maizeret, Andoy and the intervening ground. The Belgian reply had been meagre and the 1st Guard Reserve Division advanced to the area of Hemptinne and Meeffe. The 3rd Guard Division reached the edges of the villages of Marchovelette, Gelbressée and Wartet, the 22nd Division reached a line near Thon, Goyet and Faulx and the 38th Division reached Andenne. Scrutiny of the ground to the east and south-east of Namur found that it was full of steep ravines and unsuitable for attack, which led Gallwitz to reduce the attack there to a feint and ordered the 38th Division to move to the north bank by the next day.

Rainy weather hampered German photographic reconnaissance aircraft but the 1st Guard Reserve and 38th divisions were to make the main attack between Daussoulx and Gelbressée, as the 3rd Guard Division waited in reserve. The artillery was directed to commence firing on fort Cognelée. On 22 August the Belgian defenders made two counter-attacks and the 3rd Guard Division was drawn into fighting near Marchovelette, which disorganised the attack and led to a delay until the next day. The bombardment continued, with the artillery commanders being certain that the effect had been devastating and the infantry commanders, engineers and air crews pointing out that return fire from the Belgian forts and intermediate positions had not diminished.

=== Attack ===
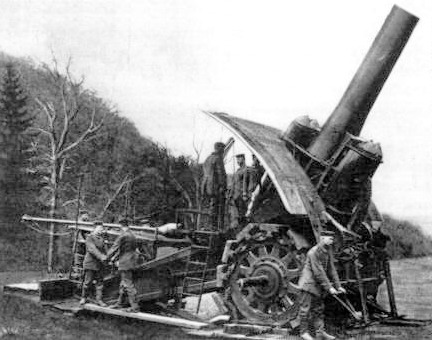
420 mm (17 in) Type M-Gerät 14 Kurze Marine-Kanone

Gallwitz ordered the attack to begin in the north-east and north on 23 August, under the command of Lieutenant-General von Plüskow the XI Corps commander. The siege artillery was to suppress the Belgian fortress artillery, as infantry and engineers attacked the intermediate defences supported by the medium and field artillery. After the first attack, the northern fringe of Namur was to be occupied up to the line of the Gembloux–Namur–Huy railway. Plüskow argued for a delay until it was certain that the bombardment of the forts had succeeded but Gallwitz refused. The attack began and by 9:30 a.m. a report that the 3rd Guard Division had captured the defences east of fort Cognelée arrived and Plüskow ordered the rest of the units in his sector to attack. At 11:15 a.m. the defences either side of fort Marchovelette fell and return fire from the fort and from fort Cognelée had ceased. Attacks began along the front towards Namur and the reserve of a brigade of the 1st Guard Reserve Division and a regiment of the 38th Division advanced along the Leuze–Namur road, as a flank guard against interference from forts Emines and Suarlée. Forts Cognelée and Marchovelette surrendered by mid-afternoon and the attack into the north of Namur reached the objective at 4:00 p.m.

The 14th Reserve Division attacked towards forts Emines and Suarlée to divert their fire from the main attack and the 22nd Division bombarded forts Maizeret and Andoy until the afternoon, when the infantry closed up to the intermediate positions. At 5:00 p.m. Gallwitz sent an envoy to the Namur garrison commander, to demand the surrender of the town and remaining forts by 7:00 p.m. or the town and citadel would be bombarded. Plüskow was ordered to be ready to begin barrage-fire to the south of Namur, to prevent reinforcements reaching the defenders or a retirement by the garrison. No reply was received by the deadline but to avoid a street battle during the night only a bombardment on the citadel and southern part of the town began. The bombardment ceased after fifteen minutes as some of the troops in the north of the town pressed on beyond the railway line. Gallwitz ordered the rest of the infantry to advance to the Sambre and Meuse, which was unopposed but as the infantry reached the river, all but a small bridge over the Sambre were blown. Troops in the town reported that the Belgian 4th Division had retreated to the south when the German attack had overrun the fortress line. During the night the German troops maintained their positions, ready to resume the attack in the morning.

German preparations to resume the attack on 24 August were complete by 5:00 a.m. and the super-heavy artillery resumed the bombardment of forts Emine and Suarlée. Troops in the town repaired the bridges over the Meuse and Sambre. Fort Maizeret had fallen the day before to the 22nd Division and Gallwitz ordered the 38th Division to advance into the broken country to the south-west of Namur, to attack forts Malonne and St. Héribert. The 3rd Guard Division was to take the rest of the town and the 1st Guard Reserve Division was to guard the artillery positions north of the Meuse, as forts Emines and Suarlée were bombarded. The 14th Reserve Division was to prevent a breakout to the west or south-west and the 22nd Division was to take forts Andoy and Dave, then advance to the Meuse. The 3rd Guard Division took the rest of Namur during the morning and the fall of fort Andoy. Malonne was taken by coup de main and the 38th Division closed up to the fort. In the evening the 38th Division took fort St. Héribert and forts Emines, Dave and Suarlée were captured on 25 August.

== Aftermath ==
=== Analysis ===
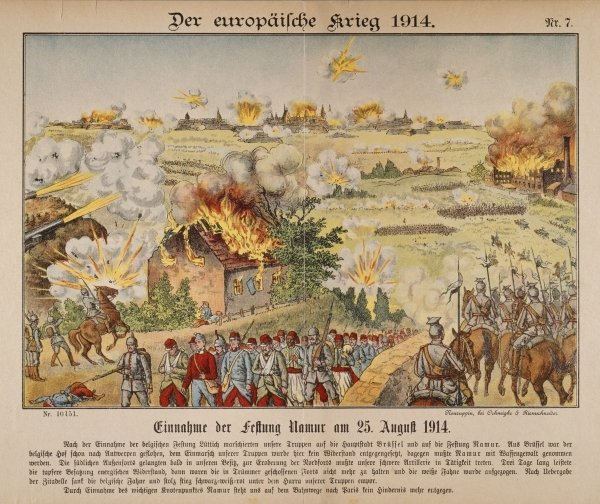
German propaganda depiction of the fall of Namur

The German Official Historians wrote in Der Weltkrieg, that the swift capture of Namur had made the French position in the angle of the Sambre and Meuse rivers untenable. The success was ascribed to the skill of Gallwitz, who reconciled the demands of open and siege warfare, with a plan which was far more effective than the methods used at Liège. The attack on Namur was faster, needed fewer troops and was less costly in casualties, despite the three weeks which the defenders had had to prepare their defences. The Germans reversed the tactics used at Liège and waited for the siege train from Liège to bombard the forts, before attacking with infantry. Bombardment made the rear ditches of the forts untenable and the attackers were able to get between the forts and attack them from the rear.

The defenders were driven into the citadel, where there were insufficient sanitary facilities for 500 men and the air became unbreathable, while the German artillery destroyed the forts with plunging fire from the super-heavy howitzers and from the rear. It was found to be impossible to make sorties from the forts under German artillery fire but c. 60% of German shells and more for large pieces, missed the forts. The fortress guns were less powerful than the German guns but were more accurate and could take advantage of observation and fire support provided by neighbouring forts. During the night of 24 August, the Reserve Guard Corps and XI Corps were ordered to move south and rejoin the 2nd and 3rd armies.

=== Casualties ===
The Belgian army had c. 15,000 casualties of whom c. 10,000 were from the 4th Division, which withdrew to the south behind the French Fifth Army. The division was moved to Le Havre and then by sea to Ostend, arriving on 27 August and then re-joined the field army at Antwerp. The German Official History recorded the taking of 5,700 Belgian and French prisoners, the capture of twelve field guns and that some elements of the 4th Division who had left the fortress at the last moment were captured south of Namur. The Germans had 900 casualties, of whom c. 300 were killed.

== Bibliography ==
- Donnell, C. (2007). The Forts of the Meuse in World War I. Oxford: Osprey. ISBN 978-1-84603-114-4.
- Edmonds, J. E. (1926). Military Operations France and Belgium, 1914: Mons, the Retreat to the Seine, the Marne and the Aisne August–October 1914. History of the Great War Based on Official Documents by Direction of the Historical Section of the Committee of Imperial Defence. Vol. I (2nd ed.). London: Macmillan. OCLC 58962523.
- Humphries, M. O.; Maker, J. (2013). Der Weltkrieg: 1914 The Battle of the Frontiers and Pursuit to the Marne. Germany's Western Front: Translations from the German Official History of the Great War Part 1. Vol. I. Waterloo, Canada: Wilfrid Laurier University Press. ISBN 978-1-55458-373-7.
- Puelinckx, J.; Malchair, L. (2012). "Citadelle de Namur" [Namur Fort]. Index des fortifications belges (in French). fortiff.be.
- Strachan, H. (2001). The First World War: To Arms. Vol. I. Oxford: OUP. ISBN 0-19-926191-1.
- Tyng, S. (2007) [1935]. The Campaign of the Marne 1914 (Westholme ed.). New York: Longmans, Green. ISBN 978-1-59416-042-4.
