= Barvaux-sur-Ourthe =

Section of Durbuy, Wallonia, Belgium

Coordinates: 50.35058°N 5.49357°E

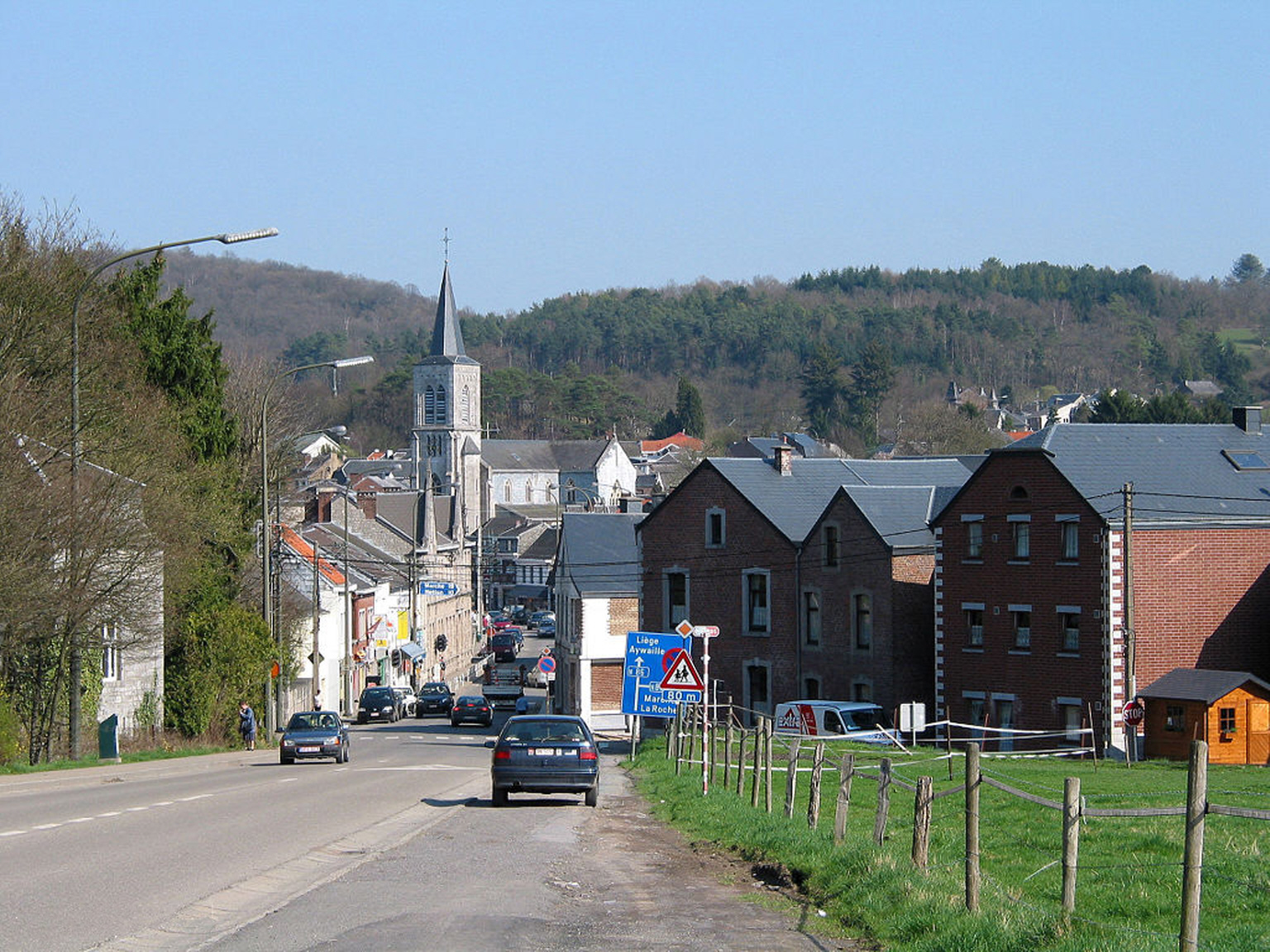
Village of Barvaux.

Barvaux-sur-Ourthe (French pronunciation: [baʁvo syʁ uʁt], lit. 'Barvaux on Ourthe'; Walloon: Barvea-so-Oûte) is a village of Wallonia and a district of the municipality of Durbuy, located in the province of Luxembourg, Belgium. It is situated on the Ourthe river, in the Ardennes forest in eastern Belgium. It is a former municipality.

With a traditional farming history going back hundreds of years, after World War II it became a vibrant tourist destination, often visited in conjunction with Durbuy, the so-called smallest city in the world.

Barvaux has a railway station which is on the line running between Liège and Marloie via Marche-en-Famenne. Along the line to the south-west is the station of Melreux-Hotton and to the north-east is the station of Bomal.
