= Muno =

Muno is a given name and surname which may refer to:

- Claudine Muno (born 1979), Luxembourgish author, singer, musician, music teacher, and journalist
- Danny Muno (born 1989), American Major League Baseball player
- Muno, a tall, red cyclops on the children's television series Yo Gabba Gabba!
