= Boninne =

Sub-municipality of the city of Namur, Belgium

Boninne Bonene (Walloon)
- Sub-municipality of Namur
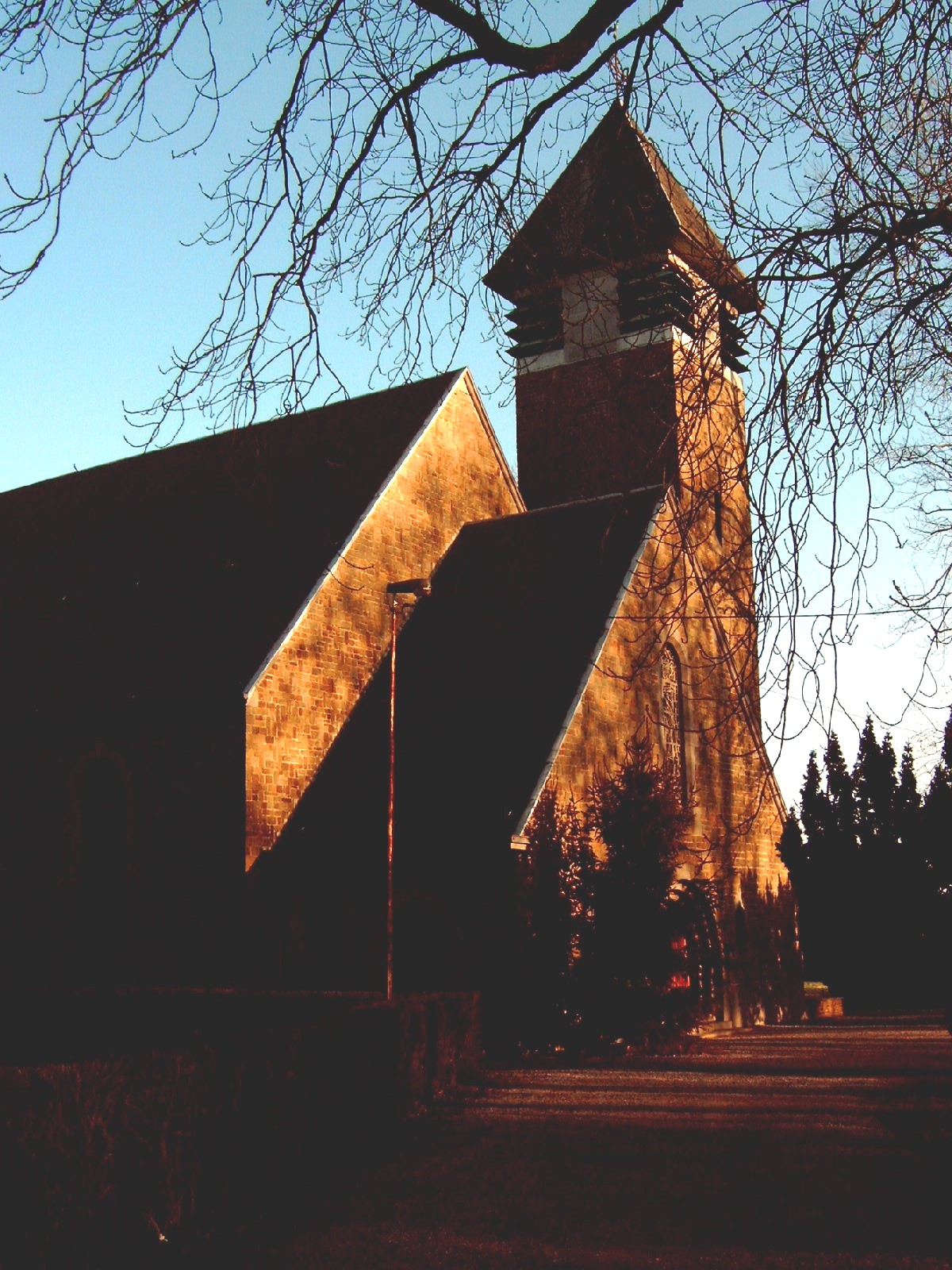
- Saint-Lambert Church

- Location of Boninne in Namur
- Interactive map of Boninne
- Location within Belgium Location within Namur Province
- Coordinates: 50°29′00″N 4°55′00″E
- Country: Belgium
- Community: French Community
- Region: Wallonia
- Province: Namur
- Arrondissement: Namur
- Municipality: Namur

Area
  - Total: 5.3 km^{2} (2.0 sq mi)

Population (2020-01-01)
  - Total: 990
  - Density: 190/km^{2} (480/sq mi)
- Postal codes: 5021
- Area codes: 081

Boninne (French pronunciation: [bɔnin]; Walloon: Bonene) is a sub-municipality of the city of Namur located in the province of Namur, Wallonia, Belgium. It was a separate municipality until 1977. On 1 January 1977, it was merged into Namur.
