= Richelle =

Name list

Richelle is a feminine given name, and also a surname. Notable people with the name include:

== Given name ==
- Richelle Bear Hat, Blackfoot and Cree artist
- Richelle Carey (born 1976), American broadcast journalist
- Richelle Cranston (born 1989), Australian rules footballer
- Richelle Mead (born 1976), American fantasy author
- Richelle Montoya, American politician
- Richelle Parham, American marketer; vice president and chief marketing officer for eBay
- Richelle Simpson (born 1982), Canadian artistic gymnast and acrobat
- Richelle Stephens (born 1996), American rugby sevens player

== Surname ==
- Samantha Richelle (born 1988), Filipina actress and fashion designer

== See also ==
- Michelle (disambiguation)
- Rochelle (disambiguation)
