= Loyers =

Sub-municipality of the city of Namur, Belgium

Loyers Loyi (Walloon)
- Sub-municipality of Namur
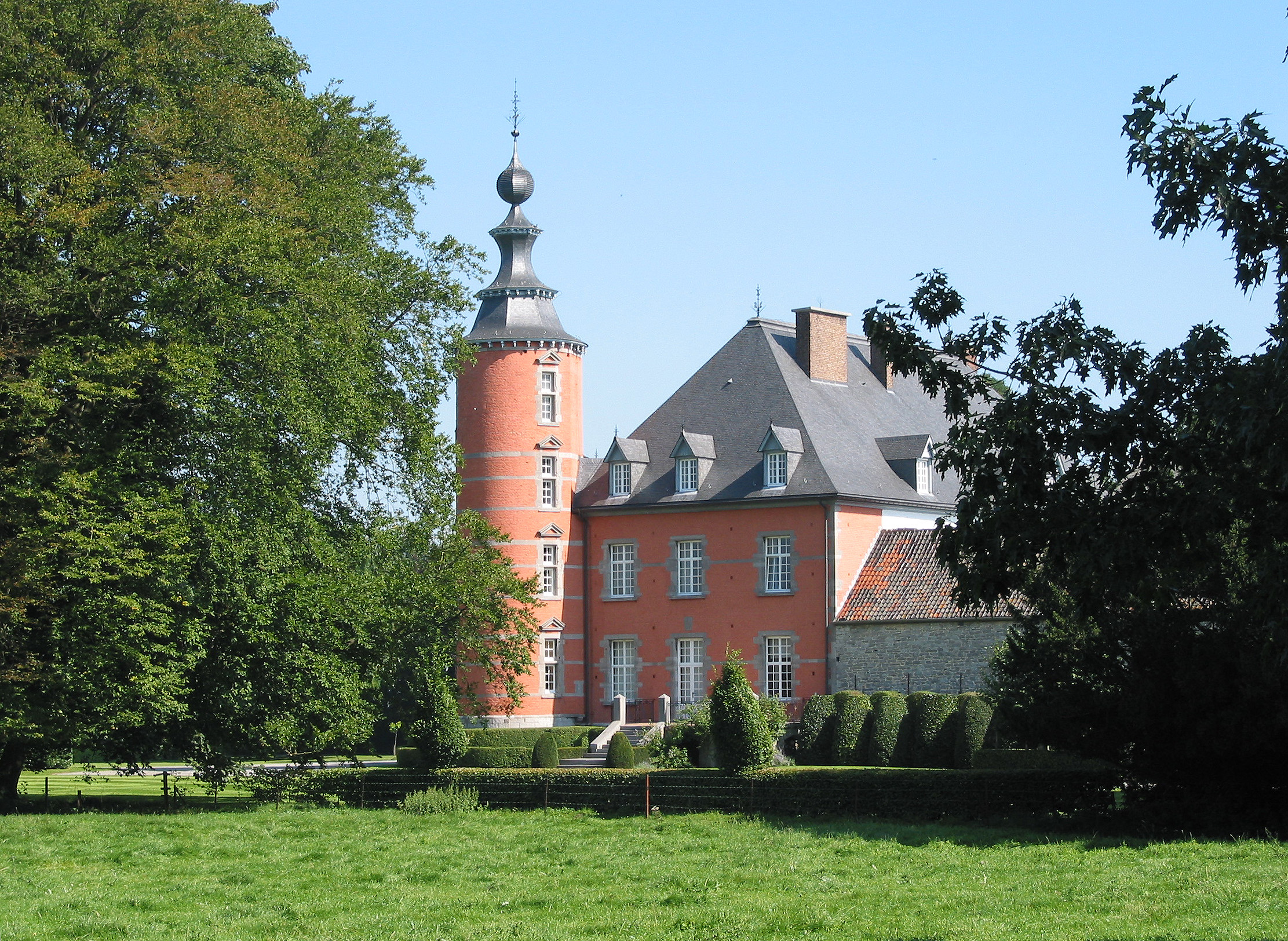
- The château

- Coat of arms

- Location of Loyers in Namur
- Interactive map of Loyers
- Location within Belgium Location within Namur Province
- Coordinates: 50°27′00″N 4°57′00″E
- Country: Belgium
- Community: French Community
- Region: Wallonia
- Province: Namur
- Arrondissement: Namur
- Municipality: Namur

Area
  - Total: 8.57 km^{2} (3.31 sq mi)

Population (2020-01-01)
  - Total: 1,355
  - Density: 158/km^{2} (410/sq mi)
- Postal codes: 5101
- Area codes: 081

Loyers (French pronunciation: [lwajɛʁs]; Walloon: Loyi) is a sub-municipality of the city of Namur located in the province of Namur, Wallonia, Belgium. It was a separate municipality until 1977. On 1 January 1977, it was merged into Namur.
