= Nouvelles =

Sub-municipality of the city of Mons, Belgium

Nouvelles Novele (Walloon)
- Sub-municipality of Mons
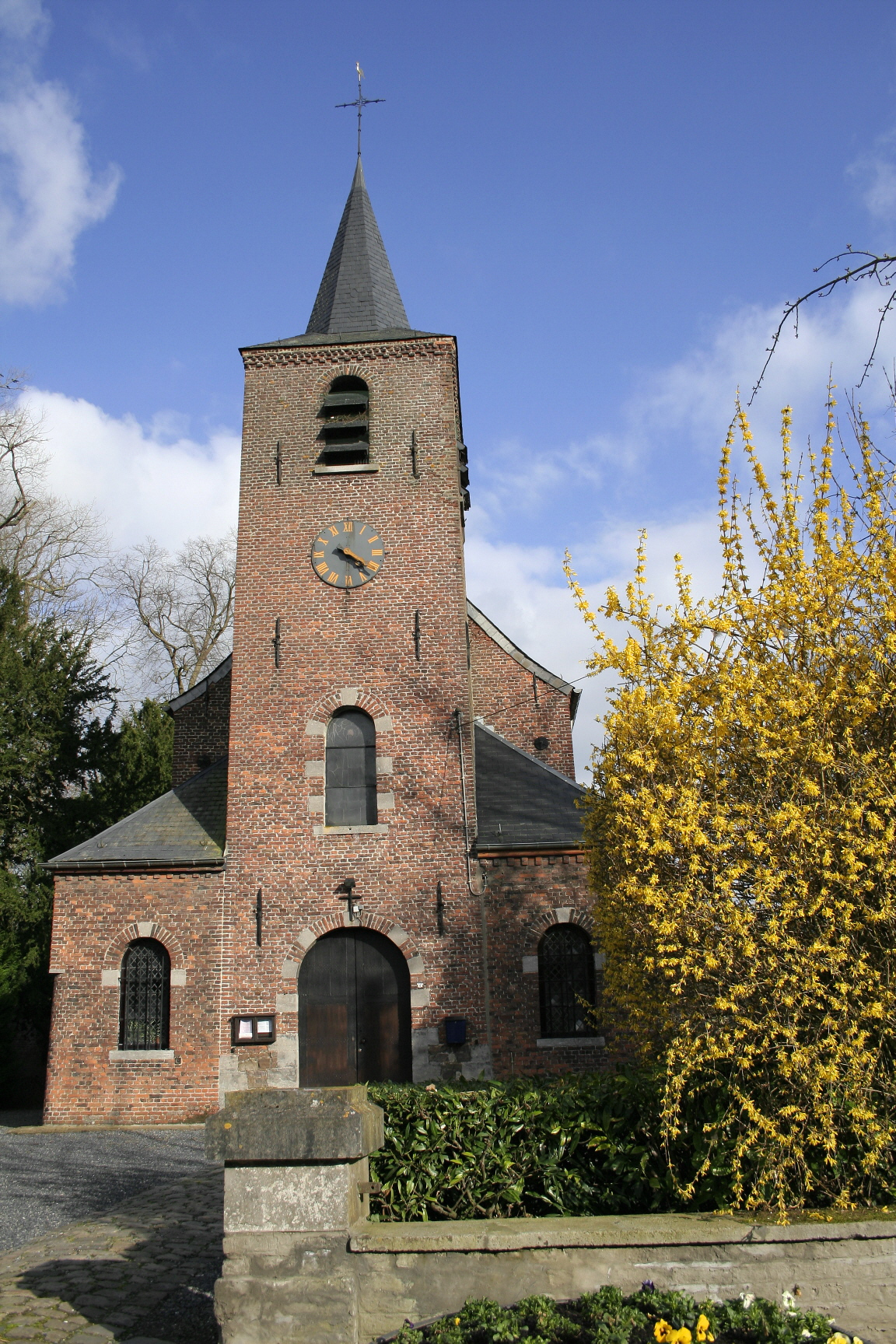
- Saint-Brice Church
- Interactive map of Nouvelles
- Location within Belgium Location within Hainaut (Belgium)
- Coordinates: 50°24′36″N 3°58′08″E
- Country: Belgium
- Community: French Community
- Region: Wallonia
- Province: Hainaut
- Arrondissement: Mons
- Municipality: Mons

Area
  - Total: 2.69 km^{2} (1.04 sq mi)

Population (2020-01-01)
  - Total: 314
  - Density: 117/km^{2} (302/sq mi)
- Postal codes: 7022
- Area codes: 065

Nouvelles (French pronunciation: [nuvɛl]; Walloon: Novele) is a sub-municipality of the city of Mons located in the province of Hainaut, Wallonia, Belgium. It was a separate municipality until 1977. On 1 January 1977, it was merged into Mons.
