= Jeneffe =

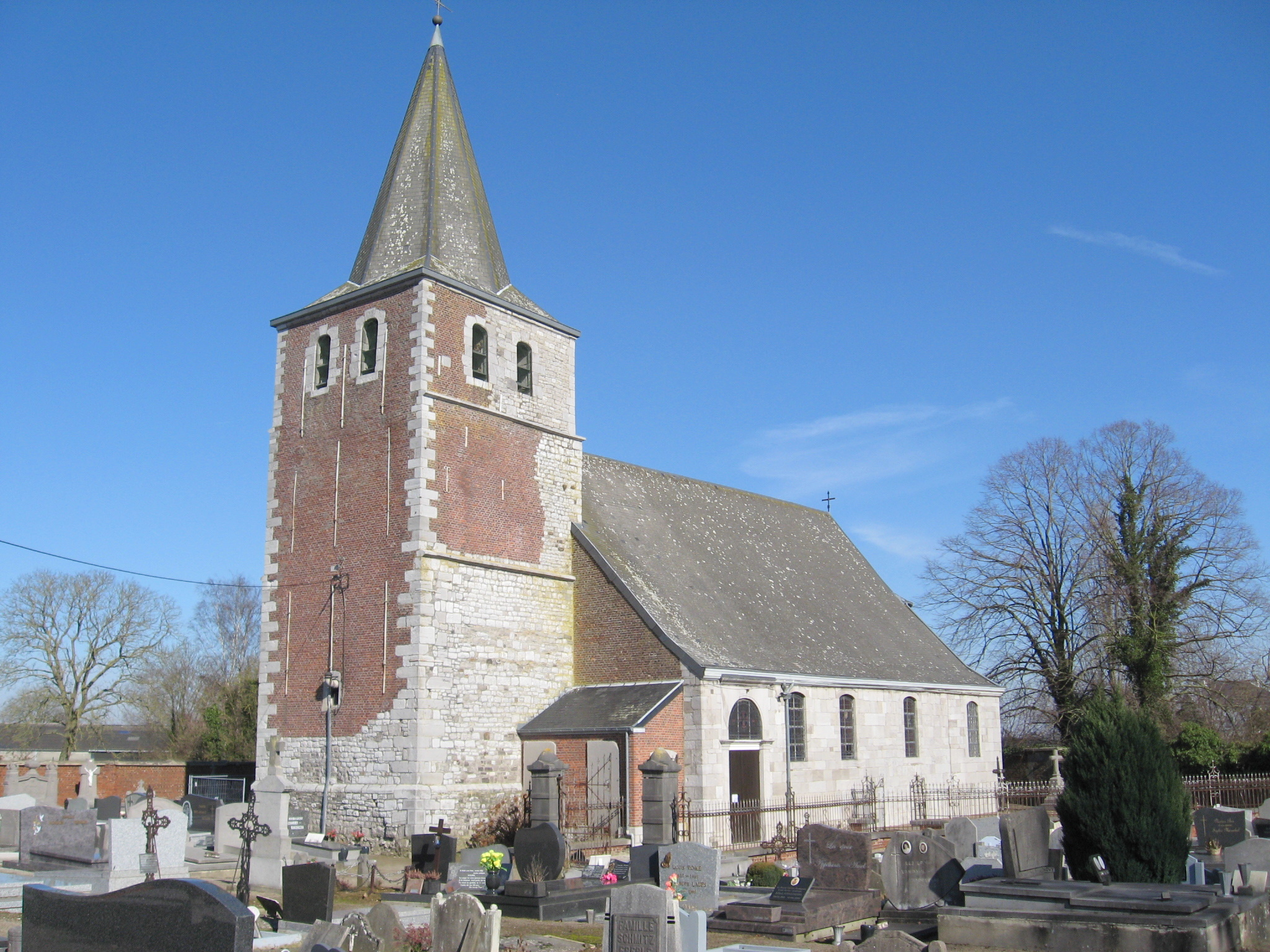
- Jeneffe village church

- Location within Belgium Location within Europe
- Coordinates: 50°39′11″N 05°21′23″E
- Country: Belgium
- Region: Wallonia
- Province: Liège
- Municipality: Donceel

Jeneffe (French pronunciation: [ʒənɛf]) is a village and district of the municipality of Donceel, located in the province of Liège in Wallonia, Belgium.

During the Middle Ages, the village was a fief belonging to the Prince-Bishopric of Liège. The oldest parts of the village church dates from 13th century. There are also a number of historical farm houses in the village, from the end of the 18th and early 19th centuries.
