= Tillier =

Tillier is a French surname. It may refer to:

- Béatrice Tillier (born 1972), French illustrator and comics cartoonist
- Claude Tillier (1801–1844), French novelist and pamphleteer
- Doria Tillier (born 1986), French actress
- Jacques Tillier, French journalist and managing editor
