= Saint-Marc, Namur =

Sub-municipality of the city of Namur, Belgium

Saint-Marc Sint-Mår-dilé-Nameur (Walloon)
- Sub-municipality of Namur
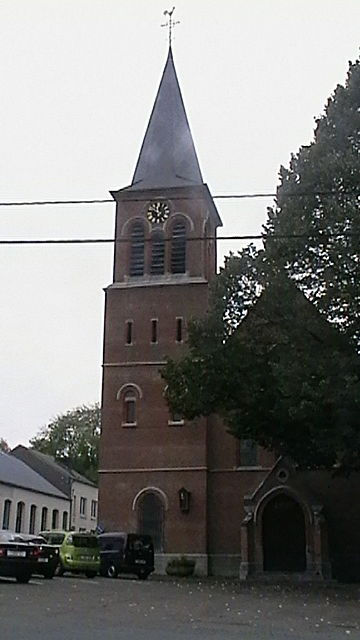

- Location of Saint-Marc in Namur
- Interactive map of Saint-Marc
- Location within Belgium Location within Namur Province
- Coordinates: 50°29′00″N 4°50′00″E
- Country: Belgium
- Community: French Community
- Region: Wallonia
- Province: Namur
- Arrondissement: Namur
- Municipality: Namur

Area
  - Total: 4.45 km^{2} (1.72 sq mi)

Population (2020-01-01)
  - Total: 1,430
  - Density: 321/km^{2} (832/sq mi)
- Postal codes: 5003
- Area codes: 081
- Website: saintmarcvillage.be

Saint-Marc (French pronunciation: [sɛ̃ maʁ(k)]; Walloon: Sint-Mår-dilé-Nameur) is a sub-municipality of the city of Namur located in the province of Namur, Wallonia, Belgium. It was a separate municipality until 1977. On 1 January 1977, it was merged into Namur.
