= Durbuy =

City in Wallonia, Belgium

Durbuy: Derbu (Walloon)
- Municipality

- Flag Coat of arms

- Location of Durbuy in Luxembourg province
- Interactive map of Durbuy
- Location in Belgium
- Coordinates: 50°21.13′N 05°27.38′E
- Country: Belgium
- Community: French Community
- Region: Wallonia
- Province: Luxembourg
- Arrondissement: Marche-en-Famenne

Government
  - Mayor: Philippe Bontemps (cdH, Liste du bourgmestre)
  - Governing party: Liste du bourgmestre

Area
  - Total: 157.08 km^{2} (60.65 sq mi)

Population (2021-12-01)
  - Total: 11,637
  - Density: 74.083/km^{2} (191.87/sq mi)
- Postal codes: 6940, 6941
- NIS code: 83012
- Area codes: 086
- Website: www.durbuy.be

Durbuy (French pronunciation: [dyʁ.bɥi]; Walloon: Derbu) is a city and municipality of Wallonia located in the province of Luxembourg, Belgium.

The total area is 156.61 km^{2}, consisting of the following districts: Barvaux, Bende, Bomal, Borlon, Durbuy, Grandhan, Heyd, Izier, Septon, Tohogne, Villers-Sainte-Gertrude, and Wéris.

On 1 January 2018 the municipality had 11,374 inhabitants with the most populous town of the municipality being Barvaux. Durbuy, for commercial reasons, often calls itself the world's smallest city, although Belgium's official smallest city, since 2006, is Mesen.

== History ==
In medieval times, Durbuy was an important centre of commerce and industry. In 1331, the town was elevated to the rank of city by John I, Count of Luxemburg, and King of Bohemia.

In 1628 Anthonie II Schetz obtains the Seigneurie of Durbuy, by permission of Felipe IV of Spain. One of the people connected to the city was the son of Lancelot II: Charles Hubert Augustin Schetz, (1662-1726), Count of Durbuy. In 1756 the descendants of the House of Schetz obtain the Castle. Since then the House of Ursel resides in the Castle. The current castle was built in 1880.

The Ourthe river flows through the municipality.

Tourism and recreation are its main activities nowadays. Durbuy is often represented, by itself and by tourism promoters, as 'the smallest city of the world'.

== Gallery ==
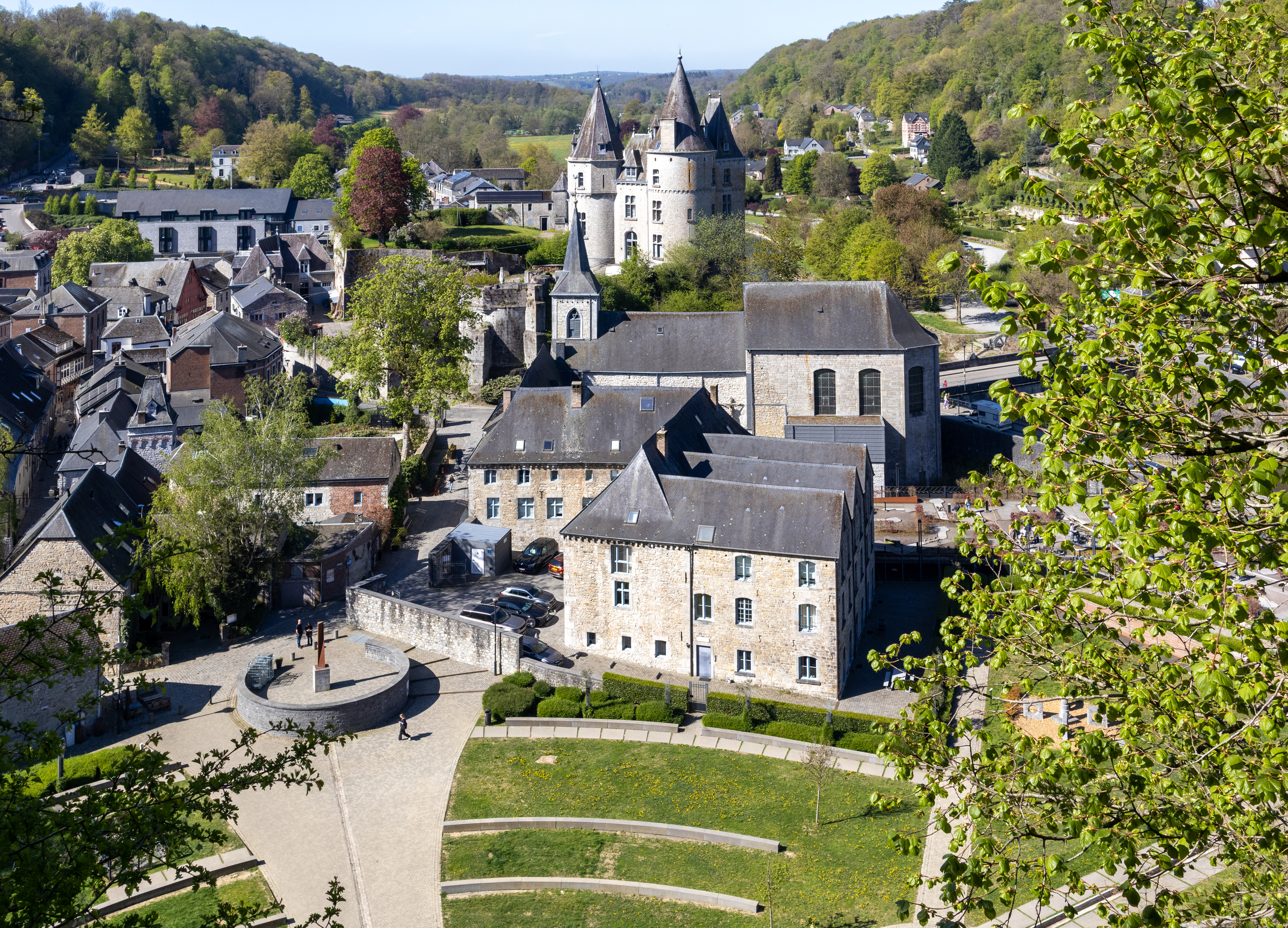
Castle of the Ursel family.

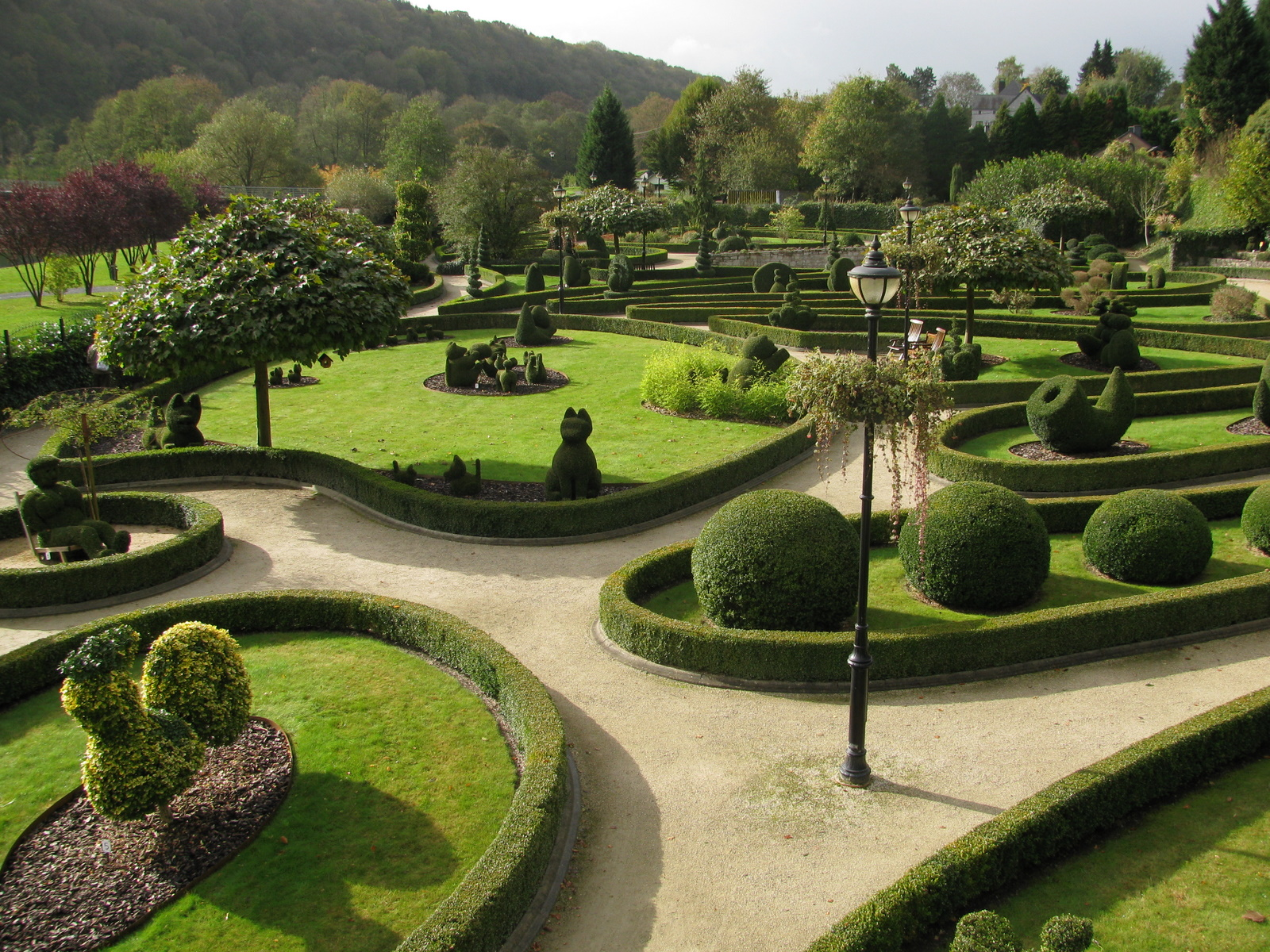
Topiary park in Durbuy

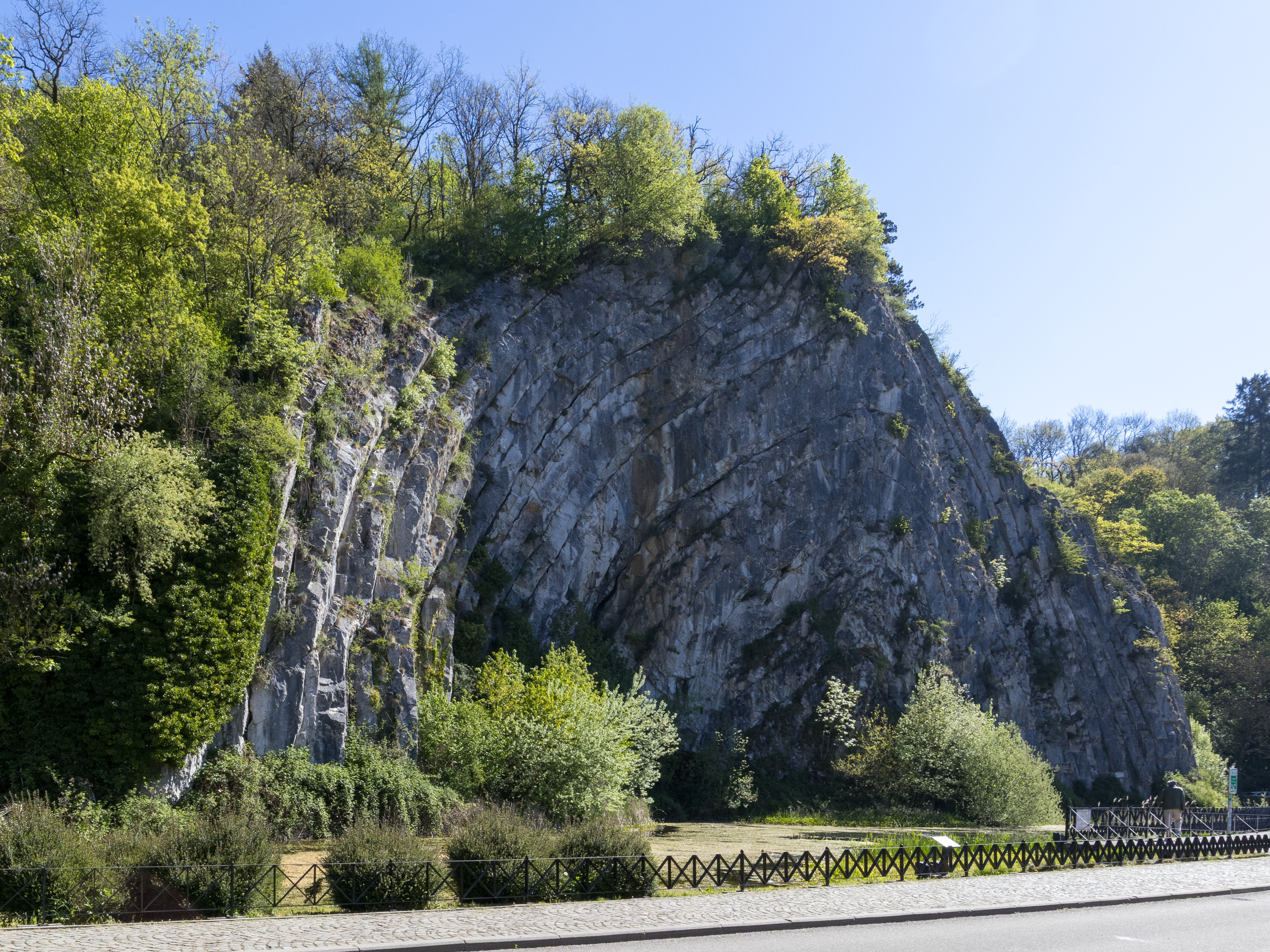
The anticline

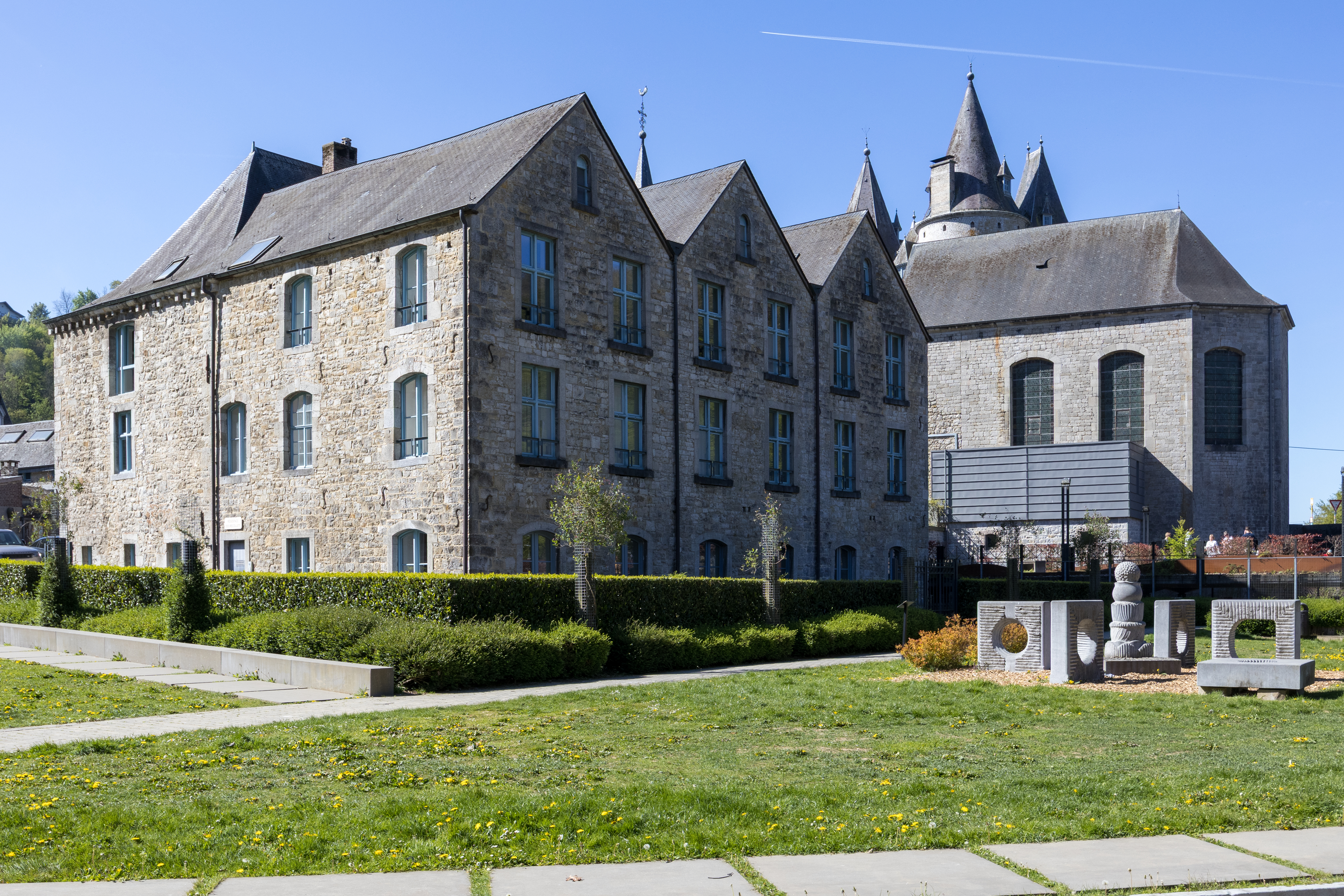
The former Recollect convent

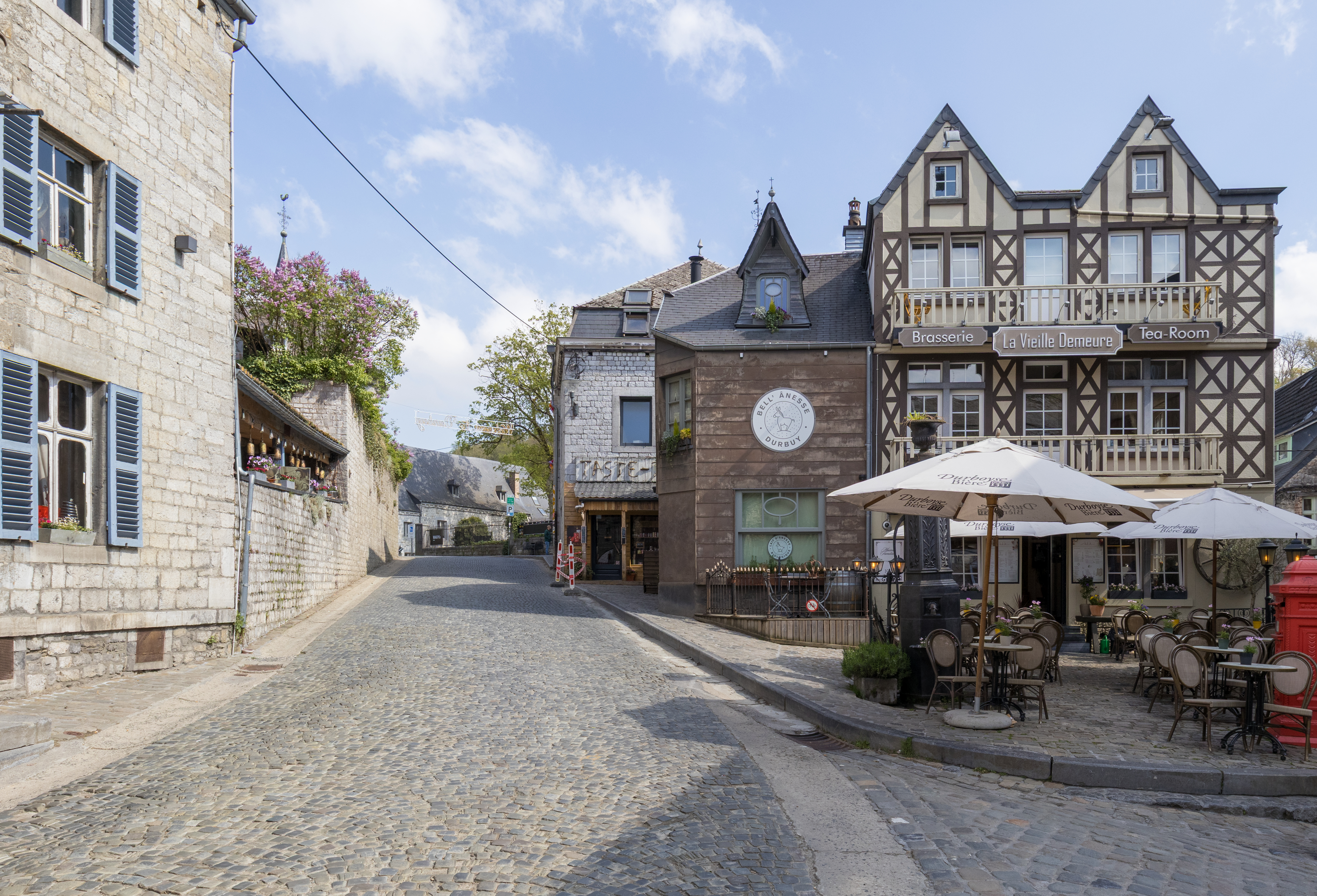
The town center

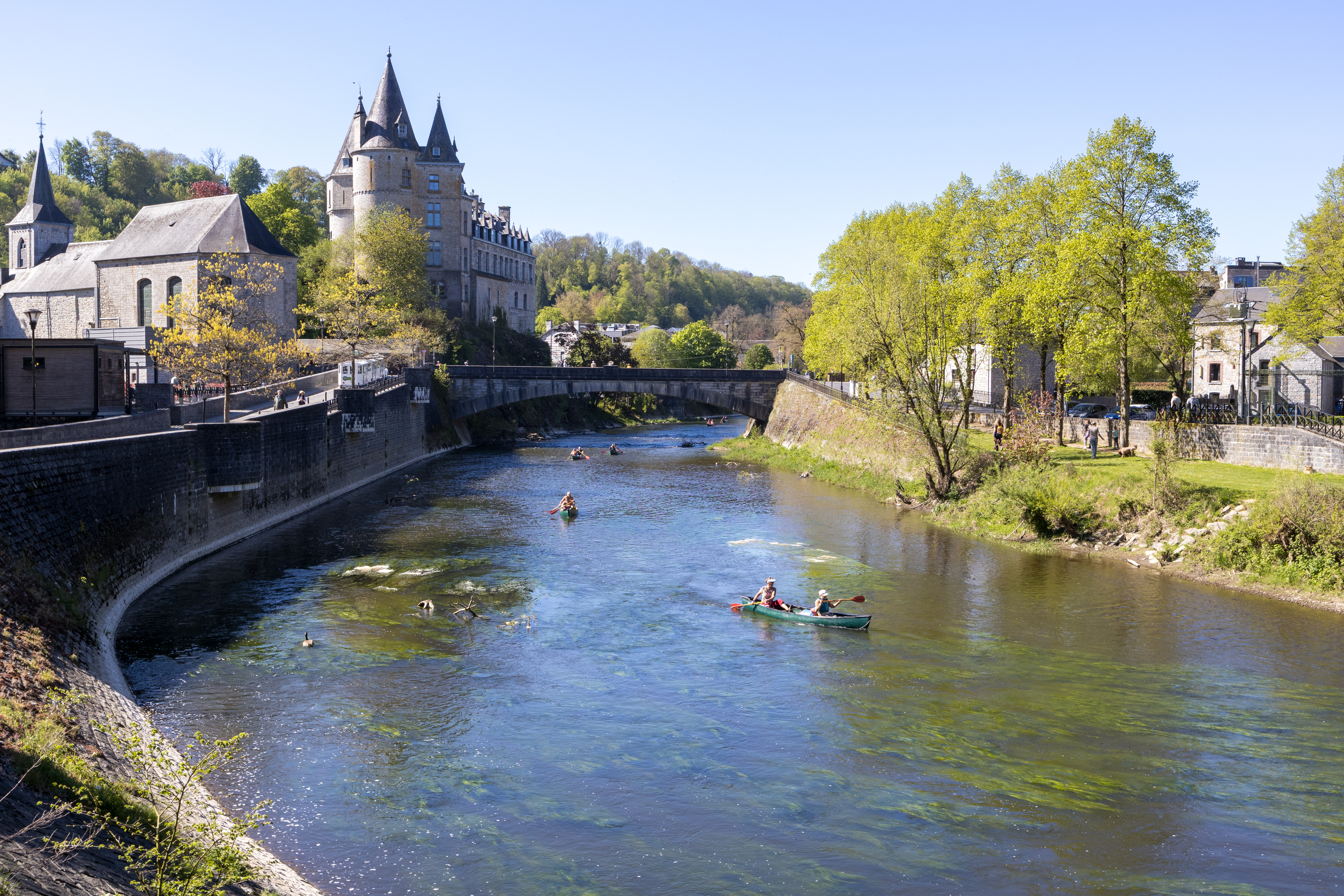
The Ourthe River

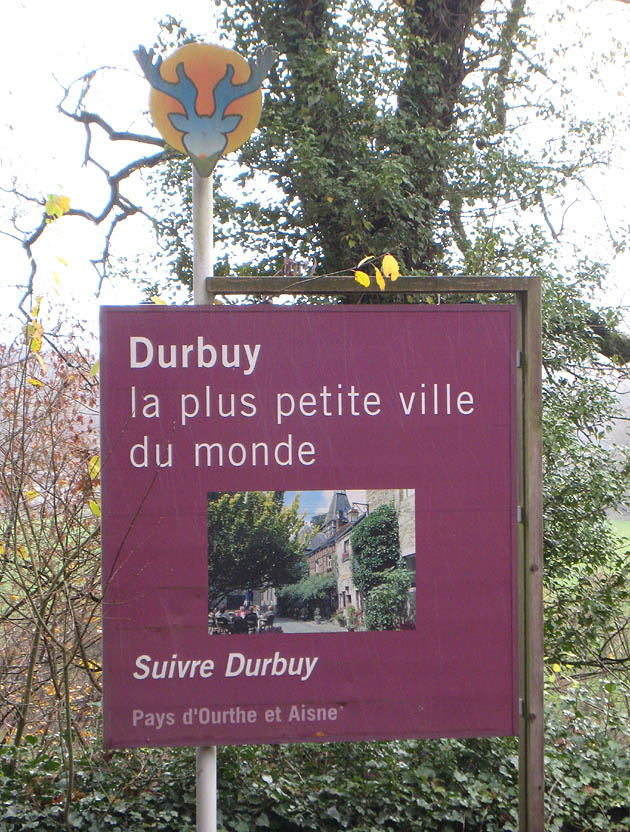
City limit sign representing Durbuy as the smallest city in the world

== See also ==
- List of protected heritage sites in Durbuy
