= Bousval =

Coordinates: 50.61493°N 4.50533°E

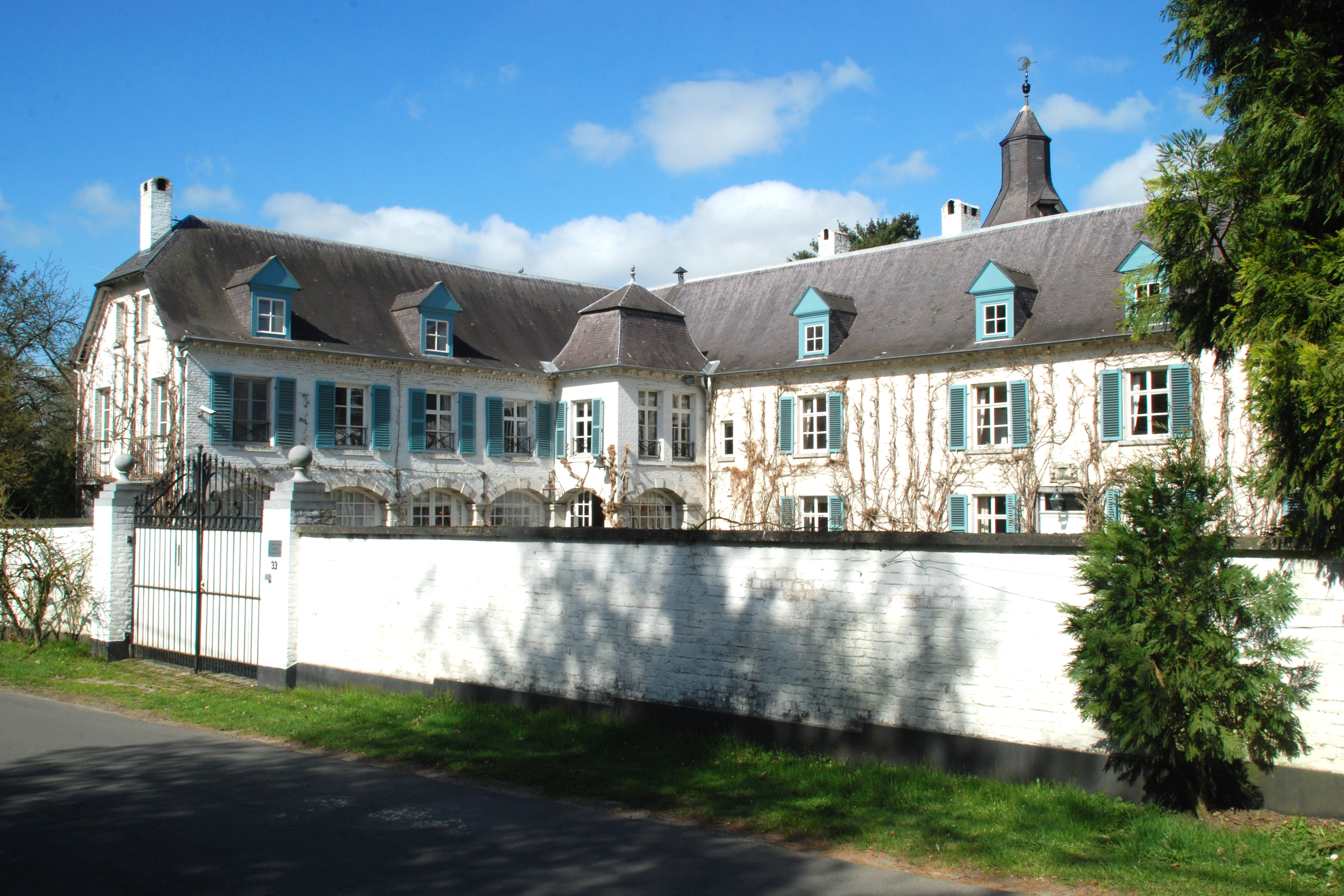
Château de Bousval.

Bousval (Walloon: Bouzvå) is a town of Wallonia and a district of the municipality of Genappe, located in the province of Walloon Brabant, Belgium. Bousval is on the bank of the River Dyle.
