= Cognelée =

Sub-municipality of the city of Namur, Belgium

Cognelée Cognêye (Walloon)
- Sub-municipality of Namur
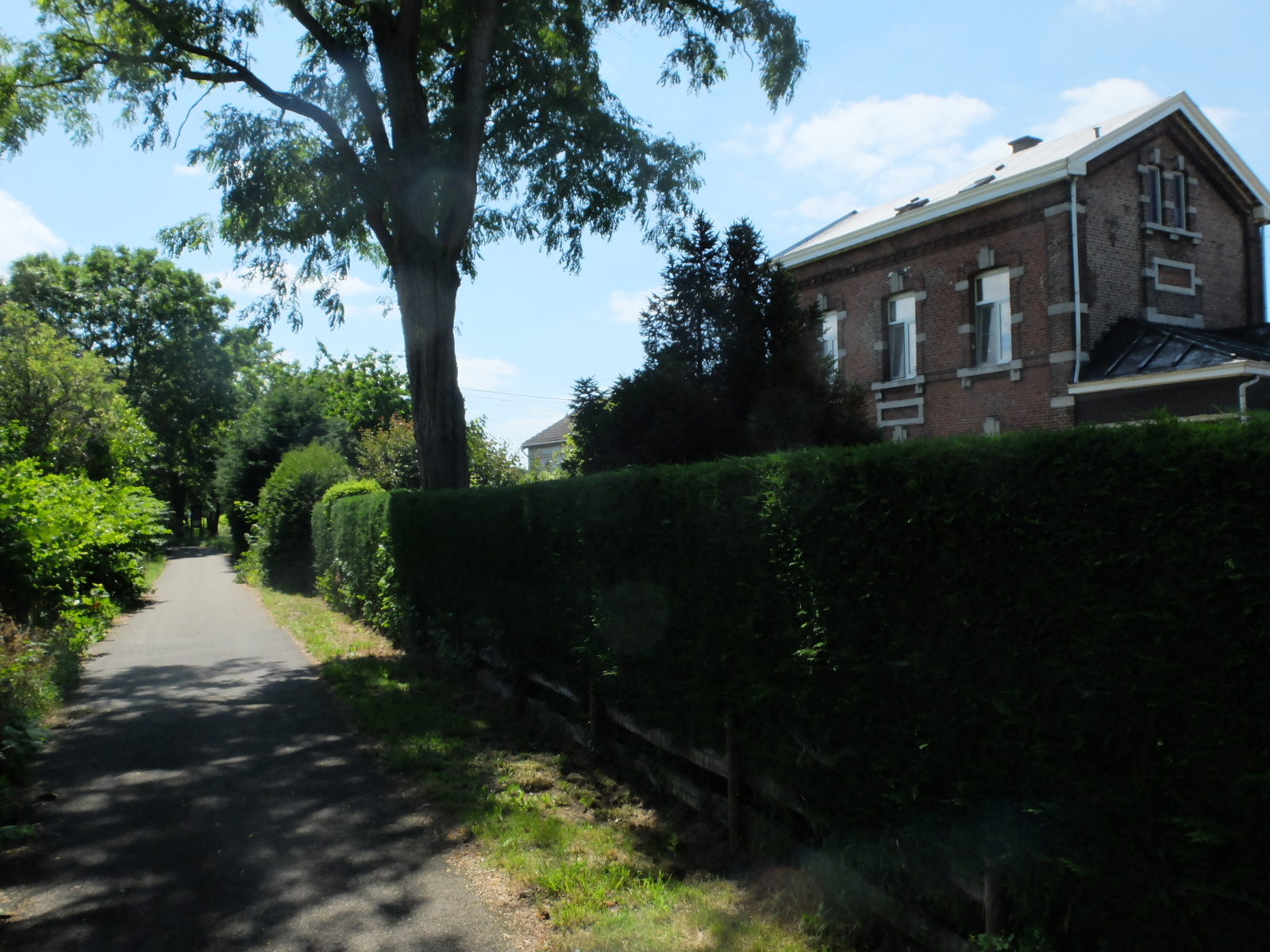
- Abandoned Cognelée railway station

- Location of Cognelée in Namur
- Interactive map of Cognelée
- Location within Belgium Location within Namur Province
- Coordinates: 50°30′00″N 4°54′00″E
- Country: Belgium
- Community: French Community
- Region: Wallonia
- Province: Namur
- Arrondissement: Namur
- Municipality: Namur

Area
  - Total: 4.73 km^{2} (1.83 sq mi)

Population (2020-01-01)
  - Total: 805
  - Density: 170/km^{2} (441/sq mi)
- Postal codes: 5022
- Area codes: 081

Cognelée (French pronunciation: [kɔɲle]; Walloon: Cognêye) is a sub-municipality of the city of Namur located in the province of Namur, Wallonia, Belgium. It was a separate municipality until 1977. On 1 January 1977, it was merged into Namur.
