= Bomal =

Section of Durbuy, Wallonia, Belgium

Coordinates: 50.378°N 5.5236°E

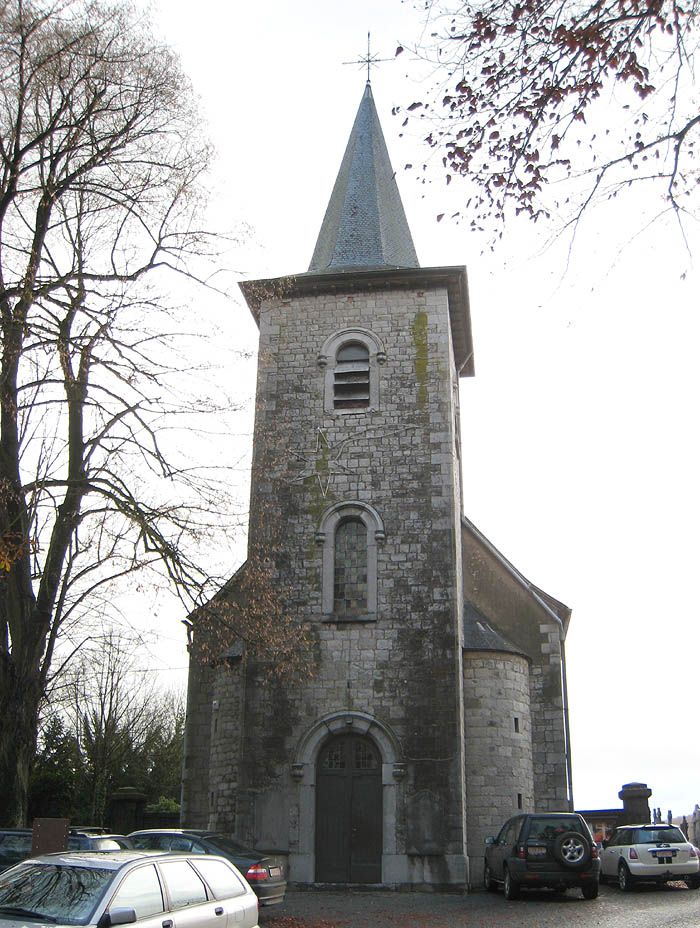
Bomal church

Bomal (French pronunciation: [bɔmal]; Walloon: Boumål-so-Oûte) is a village of Wallonia and a district of the municipality of Durbuy, located in the province of Luxembourg, Belgium.

It is located at the confluence of the rivers Ourthe and Aisne.

It was previously a municipality until the fusion of municipalities in 1977.

Bomal has a railway station which is on the line running between Liège and Marloie via Marche-en-Famenne. Along the line to the south-west is the station of Melreux-Hotton and to the north is the station of Sy.
