= Vezin, Wallonia =

Vezin Bjin (Walloon)
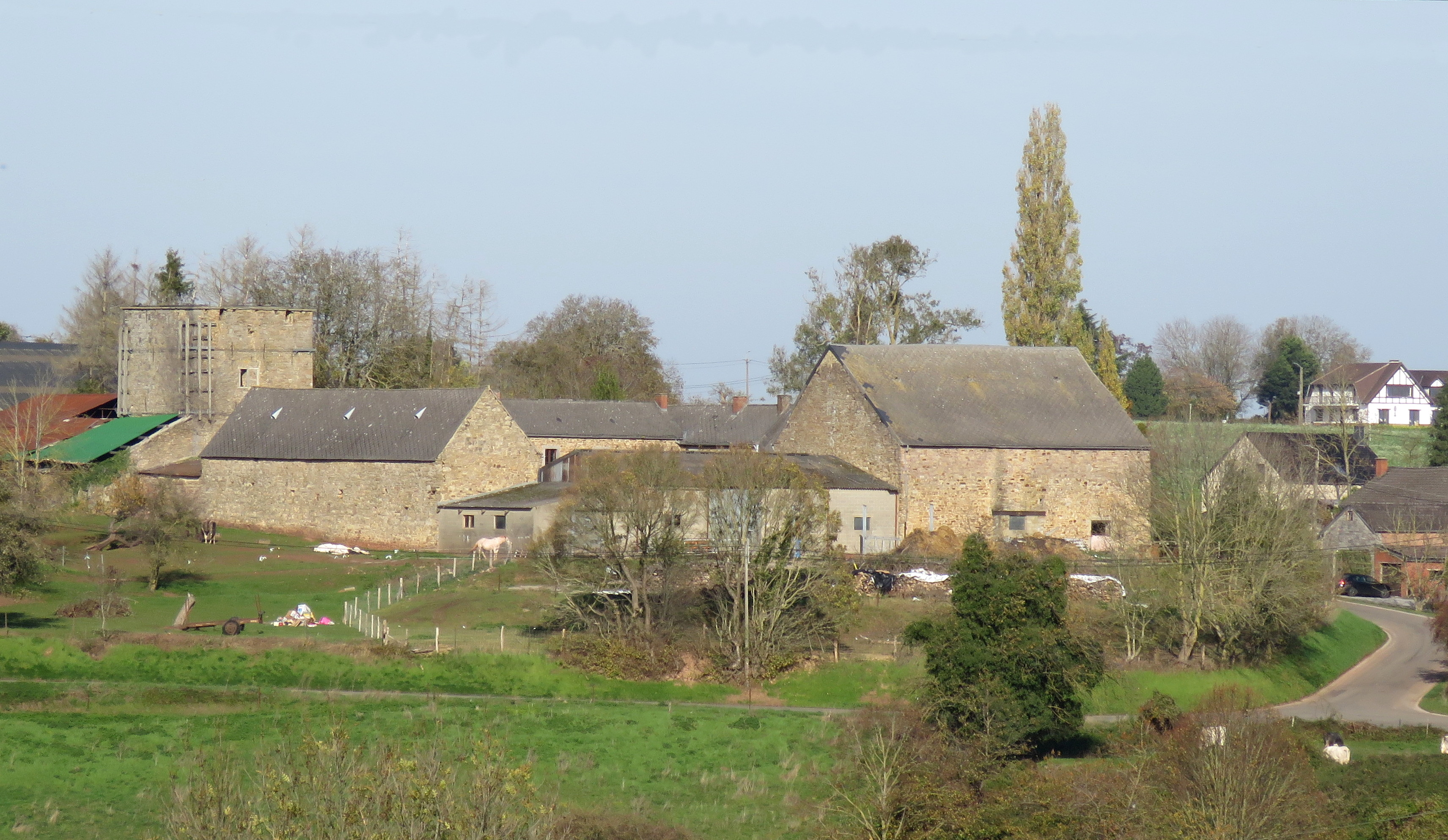
- Vezin

- Location within Belgium Location within Europe
- Coordinates: 50°29′42″N 05°00′25″E
- Country: Belgium
- Region: Wallonia
- Province: Namur
- Municipality: Andenne

Vezin (Walloon: Bjin) is a village in Wallonia and a district of the municipality of Andenne, located in the province of Namur, Belgium.

There is a partially preserved fortified farm in the village, dating from the 14th century. The village church was reconstructed in 1979. In the hamlet Melroy, another fortified farm is located, dating from at least 1580. Similarly, the nearby hamlet of Sclairmont houses a historical farmhouse, from the 17th century.
