= List of protected heritage sites in Namur (city) =

This table shows an overview of the protected heritage sites in the Walloon town Namur, or Namur (city). This list is part of Belgium's national heritage.

| Object | Year/architect | Town/section | Address | Coordinates | Number^{?} | Image |
|---|---|---|---|---|---|---|
| Old mansion Gaiffier d'Hestroy ^{(nl)} ^{(fr)} | | Namur | Rue de Fer n° 24 | 50.465572°N 4.865390°E | 92094-CLT-0001-01 Info | Oud herenhuis van Gaiffier d'Hestroy |
| Rectory of the parish of Saint-Loup ^{(nl)} ^{(fr)} | | Namur | Rue du Collège, n° 17 | 50.463641°N 4.863306°E | 92094-CLT-0002-01 Info | Pastorie van de parochie Saint-Loup |
| Church of Saint-Loup ^{(nl)} ^{(fr)} | | Namur | Rue du Collège | 50.464013°N 4.863264°E | 92094-CLT-0003-01 Info | Kerk Saint-Loup More images |
| Church of Saint Joseph ^{(nl)} ^{(fr)} | | Namur | Rue de Fer | 50.465715°N 4.864588°E | 92094-CLT-0004-01 Info | Kerk Saint-Joseph More images |
| Pump at the vegetable market ("Marche aux legumes) ^{(nl)} ^{(fr)} | | Namur | | 50.463254°N 4.864897°E | 92094-CLT-0005-01 Info | Pomp groentenmarkt ('Marché aux légumes') |
| Old Bishop's Palace, now Provincial Government ^{(nl)} ^{(fr)} | | Namur | | 50.464125°N 4.861380°E | 92094-CLT-0006-01 Info | Oud bisschoppelijk paleis, tegenwoordig provinciaal gouvernement |
| St Aubin's Cathedral ^{(nl)} ^{(fr)} | | Namur | | 50.464551°N 4.859966°E | 92094-CLT-0007-01 Info | Kathedraal Saint-Aubain More images |
| Gate of the Sambre and Meuse rivers ^{(nl)} ^{(fr)} | | Namur | Rue du Pont | 50.462203°N 4.868702°E | 92094-CLT-0008-01 Info | Poort van de Sambre en Meuse |
| Pump on the Angel market square ^{(nl)} ^{(fr)} | 1791 François-Joseph Denis | Namur | Place de l'Ange (Angel Quare) | 50.464230°N 4.865313°E | 92094-CLT-0009-01 Info | Pomp op de markt van Ange |
| Atheneum and school of the 4th degree, or Jesuit college ^{(nl)} ^{(fr)} | | Namur | Rue du Collège n°s 2-8 | 50.463993°N 4.862572°E | 92094-CLT-0010-01 Info | Koninklijk Atheneum en school van de 4e graad, ou Jesuïtencollege |
| Belfry of Namur ^{(nl)} ^{(fr)} | | Namur | | 50.463825°N 4.867079°E | 92094-CLT-0011-01 Info | Belfort van Namur |
| Archaeological Museum, old butcher shop and meat market ^{(nl)} ^{(fr)} | | Namur | Rue du Pont | 50.462185°N 4.868096°E | 92094-CLT-0012-01 Info | Archeologisch Museum, oude slagerij en vleeshal |
| Bishop's Palace, site of the old refuge of the Abbey of Malonne ^{(nl)} ^{(fr)} | | Namur | Rue de l'Évêché, n° 1 | 50.463193°N 4.859530°E | 92094-CLT-0013-01 Info | |
| Museum de Croix, the old House of Groesbeeck Croix or the Marquis de Croix ^{(nl)} ^{(fr)} | | Namur | Rue Joseph Saintraint, n° 3 | 50.463343°N 4.861217°E | 92094-CLT-0014-01 Info | Museum de Croix, oud Huis van Groesbeeck de Croix of de Marquis de Croix More images |
| House facade and roof ^{(nl)} ^{(fr)} | | Namur | Rue du Collège, n° 41 | 50.463738°N 4.861986°E | 92094-CLT-0015-01 Info | Huis: gevel en dak |
| Facades and roofs of the building ^{(nl)} ^{(fr)} | | Namur | Rue du Collège n° 33 | 50.463651°N 4.862509°E | 92094-CLT-0016-01 Info | Gevels en daken van het gebouw |
| House: Gothic facade ^{(nl)} ^{(fr)} | | Namur | Rue des Brasseurs n° 107 | 50.461984°N 4.863674°E | 92094-CLT-0024-01 Info | Huis: gotische gevel |
| House facade ^{(nl)} ^{(fr)} | | Namur | Rue des Brasseurs n° 109 | 50.462004°N 4.863530°E | 92094-CLT-0025-01 Info | Huis: gevel |
| House ^{(nl)} ^{(fr)} | | Namur | Rue des Brasseurs n°s 171-173 | 50.462217°N 4.861793°E | 92094-CLT-0027-01 Info | Huis |
| House ^{(nl)} ^{(fr)} | | Namur | Rue des Brasseurs n° 175 | 50.462240°N 4.861640°E | 92094-CLT-0028-01 Info | Huis |
| House ^{(nl)} ^{(fr)} | | Namur | Rue des Brasseurs n° 183 | 50.462359°N 4.861147°E | 92094-CLT-0029-01 Info | Huis |
| House: walls and roofs ^{(nl)} ^{(fr)} | | Namur | Rue du Collège n° 31 | 50.463642°N 4.862638°E | 92094-CLT-0034-01 Info | Huis: gevels en daken |
| House: walls and roofs ^{(nl)} ^{(fr)} | | Namur | Rue du Collège n° 35 | 50.463659°N 4.862355°E | 92094-CLT-0036-01 Info | Huis: gevels en daken |
| Marie-Louise Park ^{(nl)} ^{(fr)} | | Namur | | 50.466723°N 4.854768°E | 92094-CLT-0037-01 Info | Park Louise-Marie |
| House facade ^{(nl)} ^{(fr)} | | Namur | Rue de Bruxelles n° 57 | 50.465797°N 4.861299°E | 92094-CLT-0043-01 Info | Huis: gevel |
| Ensemble of the park de la Plante ^{(nl)} ^{(fr)} | | Namur | | 50.450681°N 4.859325°E | 92094-CLT-0053-01 Info | |
| Fruit Market ^{(nl)} ^{(fr)} | | Namur | | 50.463428°N 4.864641°E | 92094-CLT-0054-01 Info | Fruitmarkt |
| Hospice Saint-Gilles ^{(nl)} ^{(fr)} | | Namur | Rue Notre-Dame n° 1 | 50.460718°N 4.868055°E | 92094-CLT-0059-01 Info | Hospice Saint-Gilles |
| Church of Saint-Jean Baptiste ^{(nl)} ^{(fr)} | | Namur | | 50.463222°N 4.865375°E | 92094-CLT-0061-01 Info | Kerk Saint-Jean Baptiste |
| Academy of Fine Arts, former Mont-de-Pieté ^{(nl)} ^{(fr)} | | Namur | Rue du Lombard n°s 12-20 | 50.464482°N 4.870397°E | 92094-CLT-0062-01 Info | Academie van Schone Kunsten, oud Mont-de-Piété |
| Tower Marie Spilar ^{(nl)} ^{(fr)} | | Namur | Rue de la Tour, n° 7 | 50.463383°N 4.868408°E | 92094-CLT-0063-01 Info | Toren Marie Spilar |
| Tower called "Baduelle" or "de la Monnaie" and a part of the ramparts of the 14th century "third fortified wall" ^{(nl)} ^{(fr)} | | Namur | Rue Basse-Marcelle 16, tegenwoordig aan de kan van n° 10 | 50.464906°N 4.862331°E | 92094-CLT-0064-01 Info | Toren genaamd "Baduelle" of "de la Monnaie" en een fragment van de wallen van de derde versterkte omwalling uit de 14e eeuw |
| House ^{(nl)} ^{(fr)} | | Namur | Rue des Brasseurs n° 169 | 50.462198°N 4.861864°E | 92094-CLT-0066-01 Info | Huis |
| Gate on the rue des Brasseurs, on the side of the rue du President, called "Porte de Sambre" ^{(nl)} ^{(fr)} | | Namur | | 50.462006°N 4.863763°E | 92094-CLT-0067-01 Info | Portaal aan de rue des Brasseurs, aan de kant van de rue du Président, genaamd "Porte de Sambre" |
| Citadel: gate of Bordial: Main building and tunnel ^{(nl)} ^{(fr)} | | Namur | | 50.461198°N 4.861359°E | 92094-CLT-0068-01 Info | |
| Citadel: portal Bordial ^{(nl)} ^{(fr)} | | Namur | | 50.461232°N 4.861017°E | 92094-CLT-0069-01 Info | Citadel: portaal van Bordial |
| Church of Saint-Jacques ^{(nl)} ^{(fr)} | | Namur | | 50.465257°N 4.864135°E | 92094-CLT-0071-01 Info | Kerk Saint-Jacques |
| Old mansion Propper ^{(nl)} ^{(fr)} | | Namur | Rue Joseph Saintraint, n° 1 | 50.463714°N 4.861139°E | 92094-CLT-0073-01 Info | Oud herenhuis van Propper |
| Gate of the Refuge of the ancient abbey of Floreffe ^{(nl)} ^{(fr)} | | Namur | Rue de Gravière n° 2 | 50.463185°N 4.869611°E | 92094-CLT-0074-01 Info | Poort van de Refuge van de oude abdij van Floreffe |
| l'Arsenal ^{(nl)} ^{(fr)} | | Namur | Rue de l'Arsenal n° 7 | 50.464202°N 4.857432°E | 92094-CLT-0075-01 Info | l'Arsenal More images |
| House ^{(nl)} ^{(fr)} | | Namur | Rue des Brasseurs n° 135 | 50.462050°N 4.862673°E | 92094-CLT-0076-01 Info | Huis |
| House ^{(nl)} ^{(fr)} | | Namur | Rue Lelièvre n° 2 | 50.464586°N 4.861188°E | 92094-CLT-0077-01 Info | Huis |
| Citadel: Fort Orange ^{(nl)} ^{(fr)} | | Namur | | 50.458561°N 4.850731°E | 92094-CLT-0078-01 Info | |
| House: gable roof and front ^{(nl)} ^{(fr)} | | Namur | rue du Pont n°s 7-9 | 50.462544°N 4.867786°E | 92094-CLT-0079-01 Info | Huis: gevel en dak voorzijde |
| Urban site of the rue des Brasseurs ^{(nl)} ^{(fr)} | | Namur | rue des Brasseurs | 50.462222°N 4.860940°E | 92094-CLT-0080-01 Info | Stedelijke site van de rue des Brasseurs More images |
| Church of Notre Dame ^{(nl)} ^{(fr)} | | Namur | | 50.463532°N 4.871279°E | 92094-CLT-0081-01 Info | Kerk Notre-Dame |
| Building ^{(nl)} ^{(fr)} | | Namur | rue des Brasseurs n° 170 | 50.462258°N 4.862170°E | 92094-CLT-0083-01 Info | Gebouw |
| Hospice d'Harscamp (south wing parallel to the Meuse) and the ensemble formed by the various buildings and gardens ^{(nl)} ^{(fr)} | | Namur | rue Saint-Nicolas n° 2 | 50.463034°N 4.871439°E | 92094-CLT-0085-01 Info | Hospice d'Harscamp (zuidelijke vleugel parallel aan de Maas) en het ensemble gevormd door de verschillende gebouwen en de tuinen |
| House ^{(nl)} ^{(fr)} | | Namur | rue des Brasseurs n°s 172-174 | 50.462278°N 4.862007°E | 92094-CLT-0086-01 Info | Huis |
| House ^{(nl)} ^{(fr)} | | Namur | rue des Brasseurs n° 176 | 50.462306°N 4.861874°E | 92094-CLT-0087-01 Info | Huis |
| House facade and roof ^{(nl)} ^{(fr)} | | Namur | Rue Lelièvre n° 24 | 50.465521°N 4.861233°E | 92094-CLT-0088-01 Info | Huis: gevel en dak |
| House on the corner of rue de l'Evêché streets and rue du Seminaire ^{(nl)} ^{(fr)} | | Namur | | 50.463703°N 4.859231°E | 92094-CLT-0089-01 Info | Huis op de hoek van de straten rue de l'Evêché en rue du Séminaire |
| Building ^{(nl)} ^{(fr)} | | Namur | Rue Grandgagnage n° 7 | 50.466449°N 4.858390°E | 92094-CLT-0090-01 Info | Gebouw More images |
| Building ^{(nl)} ^{(fr)} | | Namur | rue Grandgagnage n° 4 | 50.466932°N 4.858638°E | 92094-CLT-0091-01 Info | Gebouw |
| Building called "Café Parisien": facades and roofs, on the corner of the streets rue Cuvelier and rue Pepin ^{(nl)} ^{(fr)} | | Namur | | 50.464530°N 4.866682°E | 92094-CLT-0092-01 Info | Gebouw genaamd "Café Parisien": gevels en daken, op de hoek van de straten rue Cuvelier en rue Pépin |
| Ensemble of the David de Lossy castle and surrounding area ^{(nl)} ^{(fr)} | | Namur | | 50.464472°N 4.802948°E | 92094-CLT-0093-01 Info | Ensemble van het kasteel David de Lossy en de omliggende terreinen |
| Farm Notre-Dame au Bois ^{(nl)} ^{(fr)} | | Namur | | 50.438878°N 4.835317°E | 92094-CLT-0094-01 Info | |
| Citadel of Namur ^{(nl)} ^{(fr)} | | Namur | | 50.457316°N 4.852648°E | 92094-CLT-0105-01 Info | Citadel van Namur |
| Facades and roofs of the house and the staircase tower and the totality of the entrance portal to the left of the house ^{(nl)} ^{(fr)} | | Namur | rue du Lombard n°22, Namur | 50.464773°N 4.870799°E | 92094-CLT-0106-01 Info | |
| Old house of Tanners, on the corner of Place l'Ilon ^{(nl)} ^{(fr)} | | Namur | Saint-Nicolas n°1, Namur | 50.463702°N 4.870986°E | 92094-CLT-0107-01 Info | Oud huis van Tanneurs, op de hoek van place l'Ilon |
| Totality of the hôtel de Wasseige ^{(nl)} ^{(fr)} | | Namur | rue de Bruxelles n°55 en 55b | 50.465663°N 4.861537°E | 92094-CLT-0108-01 Info | Totaliteit van het hôtel de Wasseige More images |
| The areas with views ^{(nl)} ^{(fr)} | | Namur | Bouge | 50.470835°N 4.887187°E | 92094-CLT-0110-01 Info | |
| The pourprise (walled enclosure), the gutter and the troughs of an old well in the old converterie of Daussoulx and the ensemble of all existing buildings of the former convertere cited above, with its land, including the driveway of the Abbey. ^{(nl)} ^{(fr)} | | Namur | | 50.515434°N 4.874174°E | 92094-CLT-0111-01 Info | |
| St. Martin's Church and cemetery ^{(nl)} ^{(fr)} | | Namur | Dave | 50.415309°N 4.885551°E | 92094-CLT-0112-01 Info | |
| Rectory ^{(nl)} ^{(fr)} | | Namur | Dave | 50.415193°N 4.887104°E | 92094-CLT-0113-01 Info | |
| Lime tree located at the entrance of the hedge of the "pauvres à Dave" ^{(nl)} ^{(fr)} | | Namur | | 50.415746°N 4.895850°E | 92094-CLT-0114-01 Info | |
| Ensemble of the castle and its park ^{(nl)} ^{(fr)} | | Namur | Dave | 50.406776°N 4.884243°E | 92094-CLT-0115-01 Info | Ensemble van het kasteel en diens park |
| Chapel of Notre-Dame de Bon Secours, and the ensemble of the chapel and the surrounding area ^{(nl)} ^{(fr)} | | Namur | Dave | 50.420580°N 4.883672°E | 92094-CLT-0116-01 Info | |
| Church of Notre Dame ^{(nl)} ^{(fr)} | | Namur | Gelbressée | 50.509634°N 4.954542°E | 92094-CLT-0117-01 Info | |
| Ensemble of the church of Notre Dame Gelbressée and surrounding areas ^{(nl)} ^{(fr)} | | Namur | | 50.509651°N 4.953941°E | 92094-CLT-0118-01 Info | |
| The keep in Anhaive called "Enhaive" ^{(nl)} ^{(fr)} | | Namur | | 50.462594°N 4.888637°E | 92094-CLT-0119-01 Info | De donjon te Anhaive genaamd "Enhaive" More images |
| Church of Saint-Quentin ^{(nl)} ^{(fr)} | | Namur | Lives | 50.465598°N 4.924251°E | 92094-CLT-0121-01 Info | Kerk Saint-Quentin |
| Rectory at the church of Saint-Quentin ^{(nl)} ^{(fr)} | | Namur | Lives-sur-Meuse | 50.465492°N 4.923963°E | 92094-CLT-0122-01 Info | |
| Rocks of Roche à l'Argent ^{(nl)} ^{(fr)} | | Namur | Lives-sur-Meuse | 50.463318°N 4.927014°E | 92094-CLT-0123-01 Info | Rotsen van la Roche à l'Argent |
| Expansion of the rocks of Roche à l'Argent, classified by January 13, 1977 ^{(nl)} ^{(fr)} | | Namur | Lives-sur-Meuse | 50.463318°N 4.927014°E | 92094-CLT-0124-01 Info | |
| Walls of the garden of the rectory and the walls of the cemetery, and the ensemble of the church, the presbytery, garden, outbuildings and cemetery ^{(nl)} ^{(fr)} | | Namur | | 50.465413°N 4.923502°E | 92094-CLT-0127-01 Info | |
| Parish church of Saint Berthuin ^{(nl)} ^{(fr)} | | Namur | Malonne | 50.436655°N 4.795328°E | 92094-CLT-0128-01 Info | |
| Old quarry of volcanic rock located in the hamlet of Piroy ^{(nl)} ^{(fr)} | | Namur | Malonne | 50.416432°N 4.790563°E | 92094-CLT-0129-01 Info | |
| Site of the Rochers de Marche-les-Dames ^{(nl)} ^{(fr)} | | Namur | | 50.478191°N 4.936027°E | 92094-CLT-0130-01 Info | Site van de Rochers de Marche-les-Dames |
| The walls, the altar, the cross and plaque are located on the site of Marche-les-Dames, geclassficeerd commissioned on December 30, 1933 ^{(nl)} ^{(fr)} | | Namur | | 50.481743°N 4.948590°E | 92094-CLT-0131-01 Info | |
| Buildings and wall works of the abbey of Vivier, except the later constructions at the end of the 18th century ^{(nl)} ^{(fr)} | | Namur | Marche-les-Dames | 50.489020°N 4.956770°E | 92094-CLT-0133-01 Info | |
| Chapel of Hastimoulin ^{(nl)} ^{(fr)} | | Namur | Saint-Servais | 50.473164°N 4.858074°E | 92094-CLT-0134-01 Info | |
| The three old parts: tower, choir and transept of the church of Saint-Hilaire ^{(nl)} ^{(fr)} | | Namur | Temploux | 50.483017°N 4.750872°E | 92094-CLT-0135-01 Info | |
| Old Church of Saint-Martin ^{(nl)} ^{(fr)} | | Namur | | 50.496992°N 4.864181°E | 92094-CLT-0136-01 Info | |
| Ensemble of the Calvary of Frizet and the trees around it ^{(nl)} ^{(fr)} | | Namur | | 50.497890°N 4.866963°E | 92094-CLT-0137-01 Info | |
| Church of Notre-Dame du Rosaire ^{(nl)} ^{(fr)} | | Namur | | 50.425364°N 4.950368°E | 92094-CLT-0138-01 Info | Kerk Notre-Dame du Rosaire More images |
| Facades and roofs, and interior with four original fireplaces in blue stone of the old farmhouse Ahhaive, facades and roofs of the old barn and the surrounding walls and the ensemble of these buildings and surrounding area ^{(nl)} ^{(fr)} | | Namur | Jambes | 50.462267°N 4.889152°E | 92094-CLT-0139-01 Info | |
| Facades and roofs of the ensemble at the corner of rue Grandgagnage No. 2 A and 2 B and the n ° 71 rue de Bruxelles ^{(nl)} ^{(fr)} | | Namur | | 50.467034°N 4.858892°E | 92094-CLT-0141-01 Info | Gevels en daken van het ensemble op de hoek van de rue Grandgagnage n°2 A en 2 B en van de rue de Bruxelles n°71 |
| Street facades and roofs of the building ^{(nl)} ^{(fr)} | | Namur | rue de l'Ouvrage n°1 | 50.464551°N 4.863316°E | 92094-CLT-0142-01 Info | |
| Facades and roofs of the building ^{(nl)} ^{(fr)} | | Namur | rue Saint-Nicolas n°59 | 50.464220°N 4.871951°E | 92094-CLT-0143-01 Info | Gevels en daken van het gebouw |
| Castle Farm and adjoining chapel of Saint Apolline Wartet and the ensemble of the farm and its surroundings ^{(nl)} ^{(fr)} | | Namur | | 50.491344°N 4.971506°E | 92094-CLT-0144-01 Info | |
| Facades and roofs of the building ^{(nl)} ^{(fr)} | | Namur | Boulevard de la Meuse n°78 (voorheen 66), Jambes | 50.452954°N 4.862960°E | 92094-CLT-0147-01 Info | |
| Chapel of Saint-Sacrament ^{(nl)} ^{(fr)} | | Namur | Frizet | 50.496515°N 4.863243°E | 92094-CLT-0148-01 Info | |
| Old abandoned street in Marlagne: chapel of Sainte-Marie-Madeleine, bakery, gate and surrounding walls, Chemin des Carmes and the ensemble of these buildings and their surroundings ^{(nl)} ^{(fr)} | | Namur | | 50.422188°N 4.851690°E | 92094-CLT-0149-01 Info | |
| Bridge of Jambes and the ensemble of the bridge and the surrounding area, where both banks of the Meuse river and the adjacent roads are aligned ^{(nl)} ^{(fr)} | | Namur | | 50.458314°N 4.866036°E | 92094-CLT-0150-01 Info | Brug van Jambes en het ensemble van de burg en de directe omgeving, waarin beide oevers van de Maas en de wegen die grenzen aan de uitlijningen More images |
| L'île de Dave ^{(nl)} ^{(fr)} | | Namur | | 50.422228°N 4.879340°E | 92094-CLT-0152-01 Info | L'île de Dave |
| Facades and roofs of the pentagon formed by the buildings of the farm Ponty and the ensemble of the farm and surrounding areas ^{(nl)} ^{(fr)} | | Namur | chaussé de Louvain n°429, Bouge | 50.487408°N 4.891140°E | 92094-CLT-0153-01 Info | Gevels en daken van de vijfhoek gevormd door de gebouwen van de boerderij van Ponty en het ensemble van de boerderij en de omliggende terreinen More images |
| Center of the village of Bouge ^{(nl)} ^{(fr)} | | Namur | Bouge | 50.473131°N 4.889440°E | 92094-CLT-0154-01 Info | |
| Totality of the chapel of Sainte-Wivinne and the ensemble of the chapel and the land on which it stands, including the lime tree ^{(nl)} ^{(fr)} | | Namur | Temploux | 50.483746°N 4.746130°E | 92094-CLT-0156-01 Info | |
| The entire wing of the former convent of the Celestines ^{(nl)} ^{(fr)} | | Namur | rue du Lombard 79, Namur | 50.465820°N 4.870658°E | 92094-CLT-0157-01 Info | De hele vleugel van het voormalige klooster van de Celestijnerpriorij |
| Facades and roofs of the house of Pierre du Diable ^{(nl)} ^{(fr)} | | Namur | rue de Dave n° 404, Jambes | 50.444074°N 4.867196°E | 92094-CLT-0158-01 Info | |
| Facades and roofs (including wings) of the judiciary Palace ^{(nl)} ^{(fr)} | | Namur | | 50.465117°N 4.859528°E | 92094-CLT-0159-01 Info | Gevels en daken (inclusief vleugels) van het Justititeel Paleis |
| Facades and roofs of the castle and the ensemble of the building and surrounding areas ^{(nl)} ^{(fr)} | | Namur | Loyers | 50.464386°N 4.948504°E | 92094-CLT-0160-01 Info | |
| Grasslands situated opposite the island of Dave and the castle park Wasseige ^{(nl)} ^{(fr)} | | Namur | | 50.415957°N 4.884829°E | 92094-CLT-0161-01 Info | |
| The classified site on the island of Dave is extended to the downstream edge of the island situated on the one hand, and the non-navigable arm of the river and its banks on the other ^{(nl)} ^{(fr)} | | Namur | | 50.422228°N 4.879340°E | 92094-CLT-0162-01 Info | |
| Forest Coquelet ^{(nl)} ^{(fr)} | | Namur | Bouge | 50.468501°N 4.880060°E | 92094-CLT-0164-01 Info | |
| Facades, roofs and surrounding wall of the presbytery ^{(nl)} ^{(fr)} | | Namur | rue Fond du village, Wierde | 50.425363°N 4.950982°E | 92094-CLT-0166-01 Info | Gevels, daken en omliggende muur van de pastorie |
| Facades and roofs of the ensemble of buildings and the surrounding wall of the farmhouse on the rue Jausse 139, the landscape surrounding the site of the village and monuments including the retaining walls along the roads and buildings along the street, rue de Jausse n ° s 152, 154, 156, 168, 178, 182, 188, 179, and the small chapel, and the street rue du Fond du Village n ° s 31, 32 and 33, and establishment of a protection zone at the edge of the architectural ensemble ^{(nl)} ^{(fr)} | | Namur | rue de Jausse 139, Wierde | 50.424636°N 4.946182°E | 92094-CLT-0167-01 Info | Gevels en daken van het ensemble van gebouwen en de omliggende muur van de boerderij op rue de Jausse 139, landschap rondom de site van het dorp en monumenten waaronder de kerende muren langs de wegen en gebouwen langs de straat rue de Jausse n°s 152, 154, 156, 168, 178, 182, 188, 179, en de kleine kapel, en de straat rue du Fond du Village n°s 31, 32 en 33, en instelling van een beschermingszone aan de rand van het architectonische ensemble |
| The woods near the castle of Loyers ^{(nl)} ^{(fr)} | | Namur | | 50.466273°N 4.946145°E | 92094-CLT-0169-01 Info | De bossen in de omgeving van het kasteelhoeve van Loyers |
| Farm and small outbuildings opposite and the ensemble of buildings and surrounding area ^{(nl)} ^{(fr)} | | Namur | | 50.444006°N 4.797116°E | 92094-CLT-0171-01 Info | |
| The abribus ^{(nl)} ^{(fr)} | | Namur | avenue de la Plante, tegenover het park, Namur | 50.452744°N 4.860605°E | 92094-CLT-0172-01 Info | |
| The street facades and roof pitches in the streets of the building "Bibot" ^{(nl)} ^{(fr)} | | Namur | place Léopold, Namur | 50.468227°N 4.867894°E | 92094-CLT-0174-01 Info | De straatgevels en dakhellingen in de straten van het gebouw "Bibot" |
| Building ^{(nl)} ^{(fr)} | | Namur | avenue Jean Materne n°82 en 84, Jambes | 50.457285°N 4.869790°E | 92094-CLT-0175-01 Info | |
| The facades and roofs of houses located in the Avenue de la Pair Elle, and the ensemble of these houses, the chapel of Notre-Dame de Lorette and the annex on the corner of rue Dohet ^{(nl)} ^{(fr)} | | Namur | avenue de la Pairelle n°s 44 en 45, Namur | 50.441465°N 4.859284°E | 92094-CLT-0176-01 Info | |
| Théâtre Royal de Namur, because the main facade, side facade, including the roof and the interior up to the iron curtain ^{(nl)} ^{(fr)} | | Namur | | 50.464383°N 4.868150°E | 92094-CLT-0177-01 Info | Théâtre Royal de Namur, vanwege de hoofdgevel, zijgevel, inclusief het dak en het interieur tot aan het ijzeren gordijn More images |
| Facades and roofs of the house, including a garden pavilion with cast iron railings and stairs in the style of Louis XV ^{(nl)} ^{(fr)} | | Namur | rue des Brasseurs n°5 | 50.462203°N 4.867237°E | 92094-CLT-0178-01 Info | Gevels en daken van het huis, inclusief het tuinpaviljoen met een gietijzeren hekwerk en de trap in de stijl van Louis XVe More images |
| Ensemble of the facades and roofs, and certain elements of the inteireur of the building ^{(nl)} ^{(fr)} | | Namur | | 50.463141°N 4.864467°E | 92094-CLT-0187-01 Info | |
| Island Vas-t'y-frotte à la Plante ^{(nl)} ^{(fr)} | | Namur | | 50.443622°N 4.859747°E | 92094-CLT-0188-01 Info | Eiland "Vas-t'y-frotte" |
| The old mill of Beez ^{(nl)} ^{(fr)} | | Namur | Beez | 50.465518°N 4.907285°E | 92094-CLT-0190-01 Info | De oude molen van Beez |
| Ensemble of the land, pastures and farms of the plateau of Berlacomine ^{(nl)} ^{(fr)} | | Namur | Vedrin | 50.483865°N 4.856984°E | 92094-CLT-0192-01 Info | Ensemble van het land, weilanden en boerderijen van het plateau van Berlacomine |
| Certain parts of the citadel of Namur ^{(nl)} ^{(fr)} | | Namur | | 50.459508°N 4.864356°E | 92094-CLT-0195-01 Info | Bepaalde onderdelen van de citadel van Namur More images |
| Ensemble of the building "Patria", with the exception of the restaurant on the ground floor, kitchen, bathrooms, porch and the backyard ^{(nl)} ^{(fr)} | | Namur | Saint-Aubain n°3, Namur | 50.463905°N 4.860446°E | 92094-CLT-0196-01 Info | Ensemble van het gebouw "Patria", met uitzondering van het restaurant op de begane grond, keuken, badkamers, de luifel en de achtertuin More images |
| Facade and roof of the house ^{(nl)} ^{(fr)} | | Namur | rue des Brasseurs n°7 | 50.462198°N 4.867125°E | 92094-CLT-0197-01 Info | |
| Plaster of the hôtel d'Gaiffier Hestroy ^{(nl)} ^{(fr)} | | Namur | | 50.465572°N 4.865390°E | 92094-PEX-0001-01 Info | Stucwerk van hôtel de Gaiffier d'Hestroy |
| Ensemble of the church of Saint-Loup, except the organ (instrumental part and buffet) ^{(nl)} ^{(fr)} | | Namur | | 50.464013°N 4.863264°E | 92094-PEX-0002-01 Info | Ensemble van de kerk Saint-Loup, uitgezonderd het orgel (instrumentaal deel en buffet) |
| Ensemble of the Cathedral Saint-Aubin, with the exception of the choir organ and the instrumental part of the organ-gallery ^{(nl)} ^{(fr)} | | Namur | | 50.464551°N 4.859966°E | 92094-PEX-0003-01 Info | Ensemble van de kathedraal Saint-Aubain, met uitzondering van het koororgel en het instrumentale gedeelte van de orgel-tribune |
| Belfry of Namur ^{(nl)} ^{(fr)} | | Namur | | 50.463825°N 4.867079°E | 92094-PEX-0004-01 Info | Belfort van Namur |
| Old fleshers hall (meat market) ^{(nl)} ^{(fr)} | | Namur | | 50.462185°N 4.868096°E | 92094-PEX-0005-01 Info | Oude vleeshal |
| Old hotel Groesbeeck de Croix ^{(nl)} ^{(fr)} | | Namur | | 50.463343°N 4.861217°E | 92094-PEX-0006-01 Info | |
| Bordial door of the citadel ^{(nl)} ^{(fr)} | | Namur | | 50.461232°N 4.861017°E | 92094-PEX-0007-01 Info | |
| L'Arsenal ^{(nl)} ^{(fr)} | | Namur | | 50.464202°N 4.857432°E | 92094-PEX-0008-01 Info | |
| Fort Orange from the citadel ^{(nl)} ^{(fr)} | | Namur | | 50.458561°N 4.850731°E | 92094-PEX-0009-01 Info | |
| Ensemble of the church of Notre-Dame, except the organ ^{(nl)} ^{(fr)} | | Namur | | 50.463532°N 4.871279°E | 92094-PEX-0010-01 Info | |
| Citadel of Namur ^{(nl)} ^{(fr)} | | Namur | | 50.457316°N 4.852648°E | 92094-PEX-0011-01 Info | Citadel van Namur |
| Rocks of Marche-les-Dames ^{(nl)} ^{(fr)} | | Namur | | 50.478191°N 4.936027°E | 92094-PEX-0012-01 Info | |
| Vivier Abbey: the buildings and walls, with the exception of the later buildings from the late 18th century ^{(nl)} ^{(fr)} | | Namur | Marche-les-Dames | 50.489020°N 4.956770°E | 92094-PEX-0013-01 Info | |
| Certain parts of the Citadel of Namur ^{(nl)} ^{(fr)} | | Namur | | 50.459508°N 4.864356°E | 92094-PEX-0014-01 Info | Bepaalde delen van de Citadel van Namur |

== See also ==
- List of protected heritage sites in Namur (province)
- Namur (city)
