= Louise-Marie Danhaive =

- Born: February 13, 1923; Saint-Servais, Namur
- Died: June 1, 1978 (aged 55); Namur
- Occupations: Playwright; novelist; journalist; poet
- Relatives: Fernand Danhaive (fr) (father)
- Writing career
- Language: French
- Period: 1938-1978
- Notable works: Heures Brèves (1938); Il ne tient qu'à un fil (1951); Sangre (1963); Isla (1966); Jeu pour notre temps (1970); Séraphin, l'ange tombé dans la rue (1971); Par delà la mort (1978)
- Notable awards: Prix Camille Engelmann (1951); Prix du Théâtre d'Essai (1964)
- Literary movement: Surrealism

Louise-Marie Danhaive (1923–1978) was a Belgian novelist, playwright, poet, and journalist. She was very present and active in the cultural life of Namur, having stayed in the region for most of her life.

== Early life ==
Louise-Marie Danhaive was born on February 13, 1923, in Saint-Servais, Namur. Her father, Fernand Danhaive, was a historian. She suffered from asthma as a child, and consequently did not attend most of preschool and some of her first years of primary education. Despite this, her passion for writing, in particular poetry, developed from a young age. Her interest in writing increased after the 1935 death of her father, which sharply affected her. In 1938 she published her first collection of prose, Heures Brèves (Brief Hours). This work was lauded by such contemporaries as François Bovesse, Maurice Carême, and Georges Duhamel. She went on to meet Duhamel, as well as Jean Cocteau, three years later in Paris.

== Second World War ==
From 1941 to 1944, Danhaive was part of the Belgian Resistance, specifically the Belgian National Movement (MNB). She also offered her services to the clandestine resistance press. She received three medals for this work:

- The Medal of the Armed Resistance 1940–1945
- The Commemorative Medal of the 1940–1945 War
- A medal from the MNB

== Writing ==
The war and her work in the Resistance did not prevent Danhaive from continuing to write: the anthology Voyage loin dans le temps (Distant Voyage in Time) was published at Éditions Messages by la Maison du Poète in 1941, (Note: This publication was made possible thanks to Pierre-Louis Flouquet, the founder of Journal de Poètes.) and Lettres données au vent (Letters in the Wind), a collection of surrealist poetry, was published in 1943. She also wrote the unpublished novel Kerimore during this period.

In addition to poetry and novels, Danhaive also wrote several plays throughout her life, including the following major works:

- Il ne tient qu'à un fil (It's hanging on by a thread, 1951), a three-act comedy, premiered at the APIAW. (Note: Association for the Intellectual and Artistic Progress of Wallonia)
- Sangre (1963), delivering a poignant critique of the situation in Spain during the Asturian miners' strike of 1962.
- Pâques sans rameaux (Easter without twigs, 1964), a play about the tragedy of Thalidomide, the profits for which went to disabled people; unpublished, performed January 30, 1964.
- Isla (1965), play in two acts, funded by the Théâtre d'Essai 1964 prize.
- Jeu pour notre temps (Game for our Time, 1970), the title of which eventually became Je tuerai le temps avec des gadgets qu'on colle au mur pour écouter rêver les voisins (I'll kill time with gadgets we stick on the wall to listen to our neighbours dream)

Some of her plays attest to her commitment against poverty and injustice and in defence of those more vulnerable. This theme is also found in her novels and poetry: Séraphin, l'ange tombé dans la rue (Seraphin, the Fallen Angel in the Street, Éditions de la Grisière, Paris, 1971) attacks the inhumanity of the contemporary world, the crises of alcoholism, housing, and medicine. Social themes interested her, such as in Comme un seul homme (Like Only One Man, 1961), a fictionalized account of the Belgian general strike of 1960–1961.

Her dramatic writing also extended to radio plays, notably:

- Le Semeur de rêves (The Dream Sower, 1946), written for the Swiss Broadcasting Corporation for the Feast of the Ascension.
- Symphonie de l'Aube éternelle (Symphony of the Eternal Dawn, 1946), for the Swiss Broadcasting Corporation at Lausanne.
- Les Porteurs de Croix (The Cross-Bearers, 1946), for Radio Namur.
- La Légende des Dames de Marche (The Legend of the Dames de Marche, 1950), a medieval play, inspired by the legend of Marche-les-Dames, broadcast on Radio Namur.
- Algone ou le visage de la folie (Algone or the Face of Folly, 1954)

== Journalism ==
Danhaive began her journalism career in 1946 at Indépendance, though she left after a year to work at La Meuse, where she became editing secretary after two years. In 1954, she left La Meuse to return to Indépendance, where she worked until 1965. Meanwhile, from 1952 to 1958, she was a correspondent for the weekly newspaper Pourquoi pas?.

Over the years, she covered many topics including politics, literature, and the law.

== Namur Palace of Culture ==
Danhaive quit her journalism career to work as press secretary for the Namur Palace of Culture upon its opening in 1964. There, she edited articles for the monthly newsletter, mostly those about theatre and literature.

Danhaive's work at the Palace of Culture led to the creation of the group Poésie and its regional Créateurs d'art initiative. The group grew out of a call Danhaive put out to all female Namuroise artists, including poets, musicians, painters, sculptors, or singers, inviting them to get together and collaborate. She got many responses, which led to many collaborative artistic exhibitions.

== Theatre Studies Centre of Louvain ==
Beginning in 1970, she took courses at the Theatre studies centre (Centre d'Études théâtrales) at UCLouvain. Her professors noticed her curiosity and assiduity. One of them, Raymond Pouilliart, remarked about Danhaive, "I have rarely encountered a student whose studies, freely chosen, satisfied them so much and awoke in them such an intellectual joy, such a fever. Age has not dampened her capacity for enthusiasm."

She received her diploma in 1974, her thesis a memoir about symbolist poet Saint-Pol-Roux.

In 1971, during her studies, Danhaive's sister Ann-Marie died. This loss affected her profoundly, and her literary output was diminished in the years following. La Cassure is an unpublished novel that she wrote in memory of her sister in 1973.

== Death ==
In 1977, Danhaive was hospitalized following a myocardial infarction. Despite her doctors strongly advising she rest, she never stopped writing. In 1978, she compiled Par delà la mort, which was published posthumously.

Danhaive died on June 1, 1978, surrounded by her closest friends.

The documents she produced over the course of her life are preserved by family friend Marie-Louise Damoiseau. Upon Damoiseau's death, Danhaive's archives are willed to the Centre de Ressources historiques namuroises (CeRHiN, Historical Resource Centre of Namur).
