= Edouard de Woelmont =

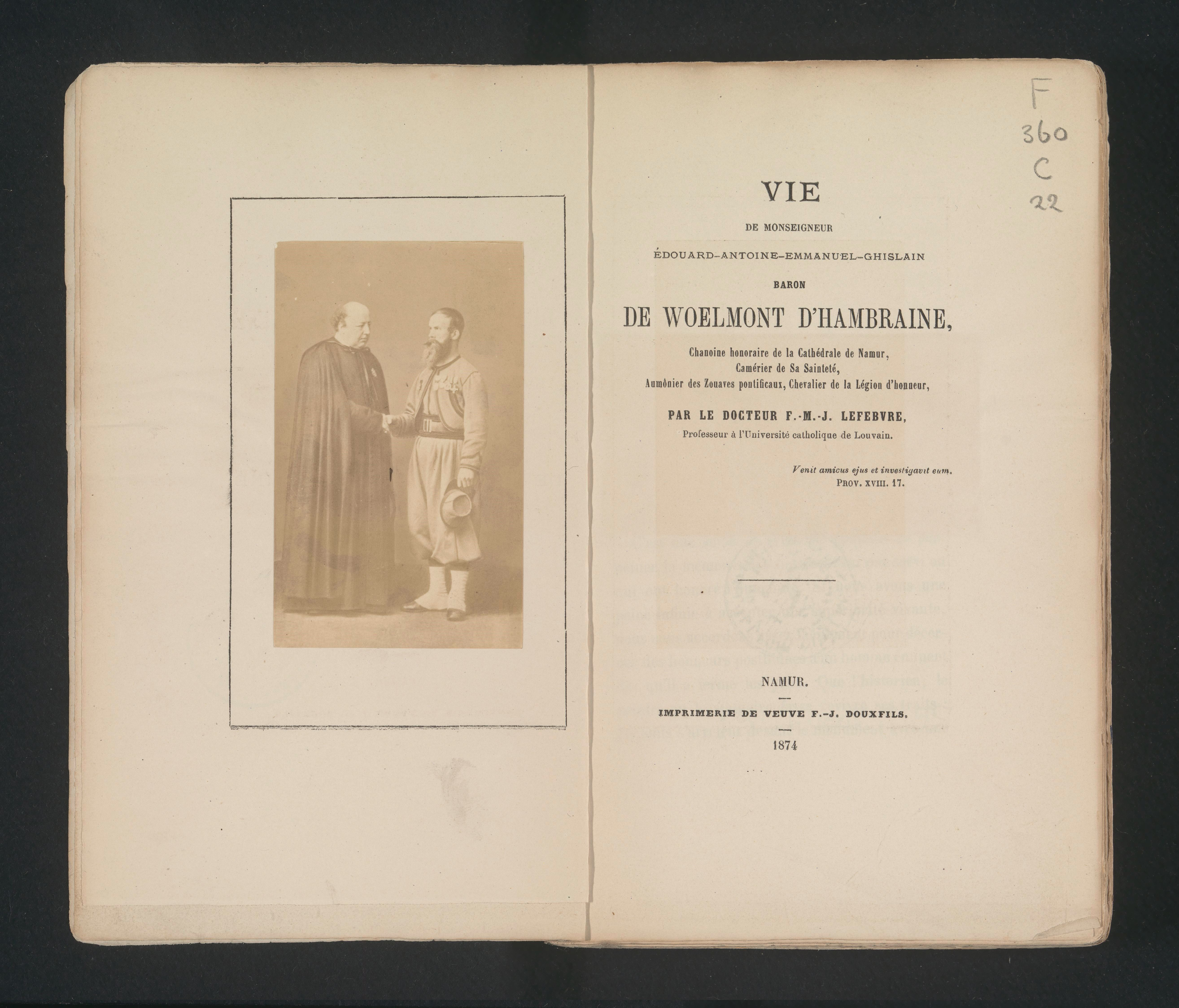
Edouard de Woelmont

Mgr. Edouard Charles Emannuel Ghislain, Count de Woelmont d'Hambraine (Namur, 1824-1871) was a Belgian prelate.

He was the son of count Joseph de Woelmont d'Hambraine and Constance de Coppin de Conjoux (1790-1854), his brother Ferdinand de Woelmont was a member of the Belgian senate. In 1849 he assisted the needy when the Roman Republic was proclaimed, bringing the blessed sacrament to the suffering. He assisted Mgr. de Merode in the hospitals in Rome before he was sent to Constantinople. and was made a canon of Namur Cathedral in gratitude. For his efforts in the Crimean War he received the Legion of Honour.

== Titles ==
- Honorary canon of St Aubin's Cathedral, Namur.
- Honorary Prelate of His Holiness
- Secret Camerlengo of His Holinnes
- Grand Almoner of the Papal Zouaves.
- Knight of the Legion of Honour.
- Cross of Mentana.
