= Rhisnes, Namur =

Suburb of the city of Namur, Belgium

Rhisnes
- Suburb of Namur
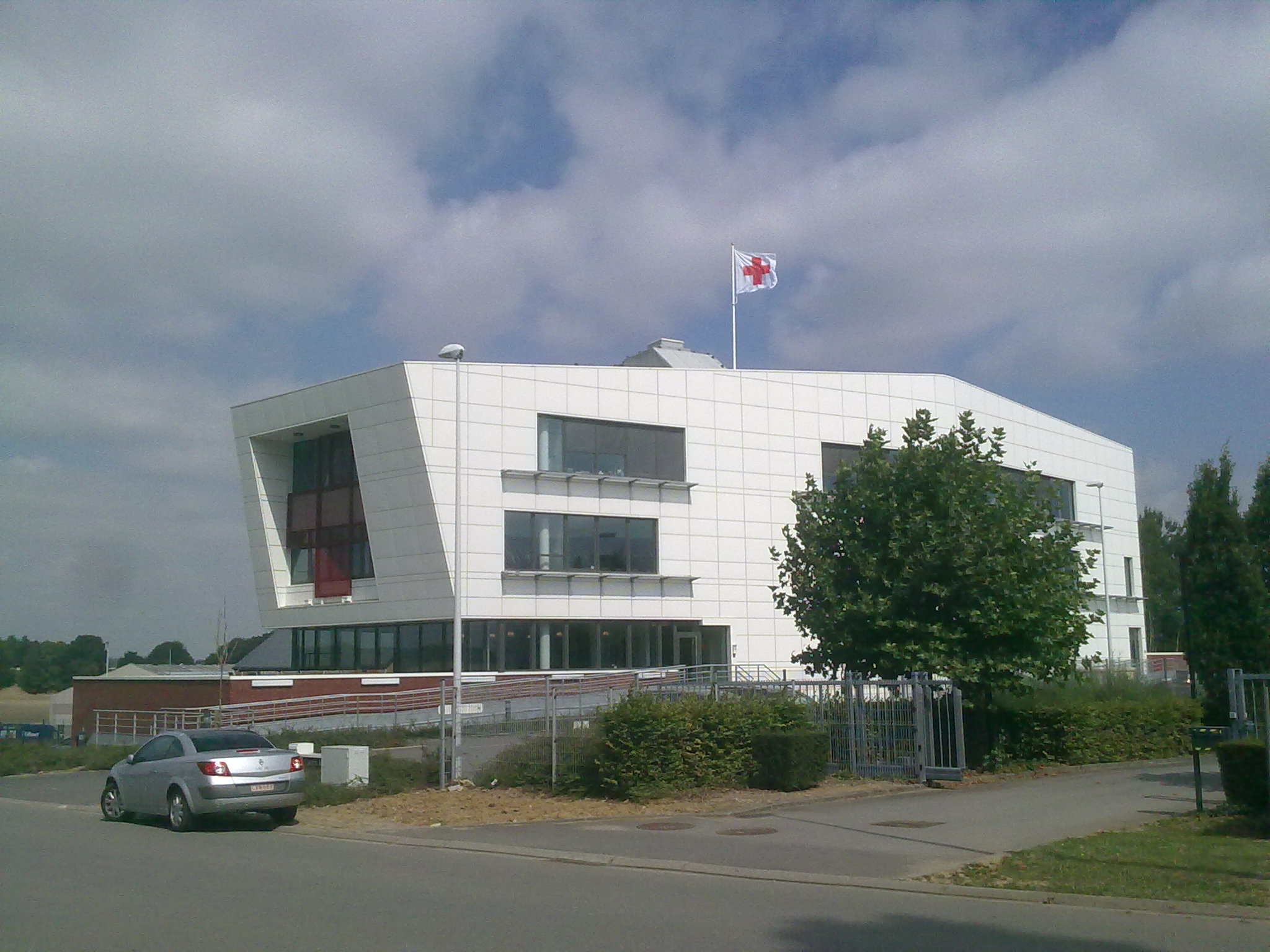
- Blood center of the Belgian Red Cross
- Interactive map of Rhisnes
- Location within Belgium Location within Namur Province
- Coordinates: 50°29′28″N 4°47′53″E
- Country: Belgium
- Community: French Community
- Region: Wallonia
- Province: Namur
- Arrondissement: Namur
- Municipality: Namur

Area
  - Total: 0.6702 km^{2} (0.2588 sq mi)

Population (2017-03-02)
  - Total: 24
  - Density: 36/km^{2} (93/sq mi)
- Postal codes: 5020
- Area codes: 081

Rhisnes (French pronunciation: [ʁin]) is a suburb of the city of Namur located in the province of Namur, Wallonia, Belgium. But in some sources, Rhisnes is mentioned as a "section" (sub-municipality).

The suburb is bounded on the north by the E42/A15 motorway (exit number 12 Namur-Ouest (Namur West)), to the east by the N904 road, and to the west by the N4 road. The dominant features in the suburb is the Namur-Nord-Rhisnes (Namur North Rhisnes) business park and the Ecolys park. The neighbouring old Suarlée Fort and park lands are just outside the suburb.
