= Namur =

Capital of Namur province and Wallonia, Belgium

Namur: Nameur (Walloon); Namen (Dutch)
- Municipality
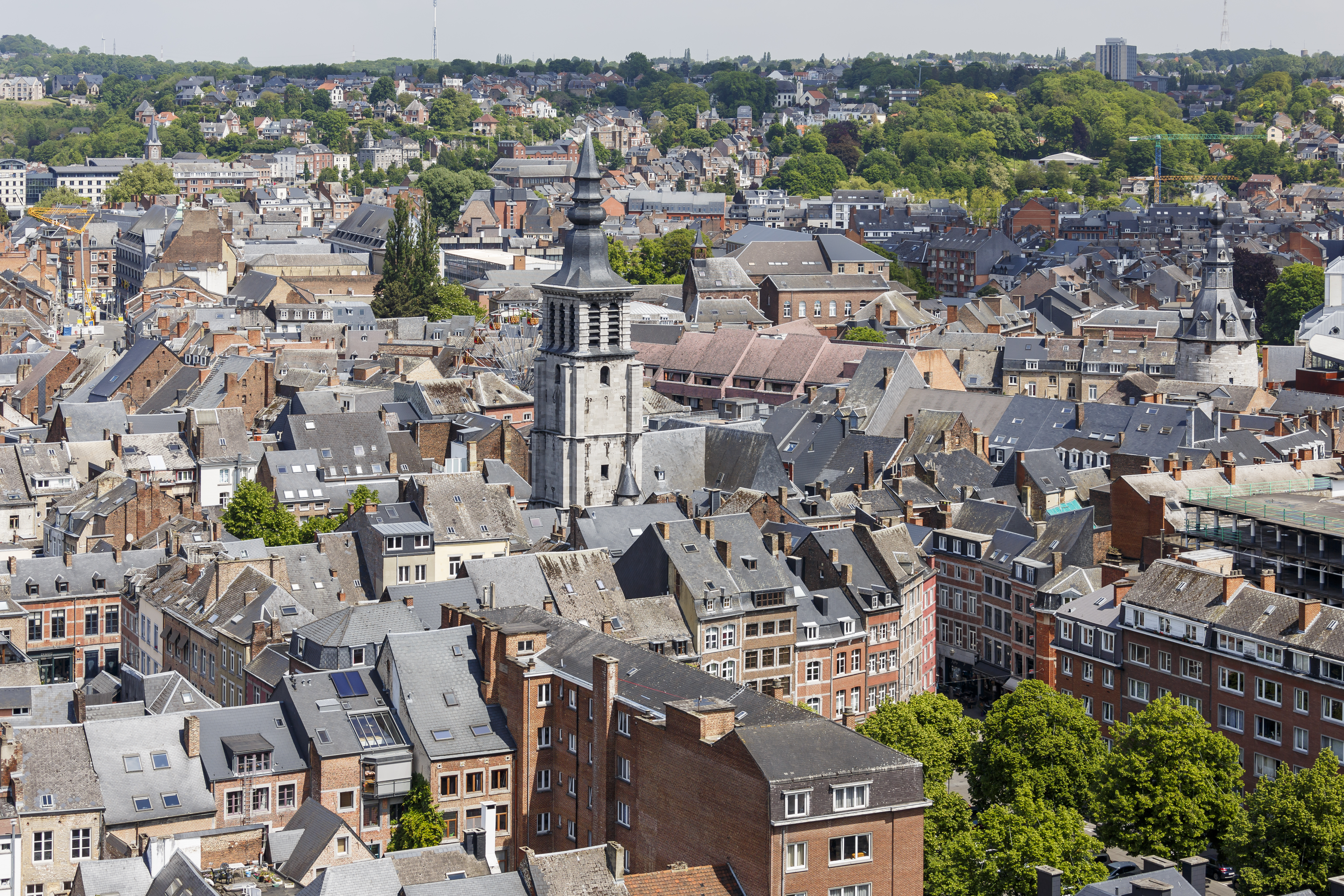
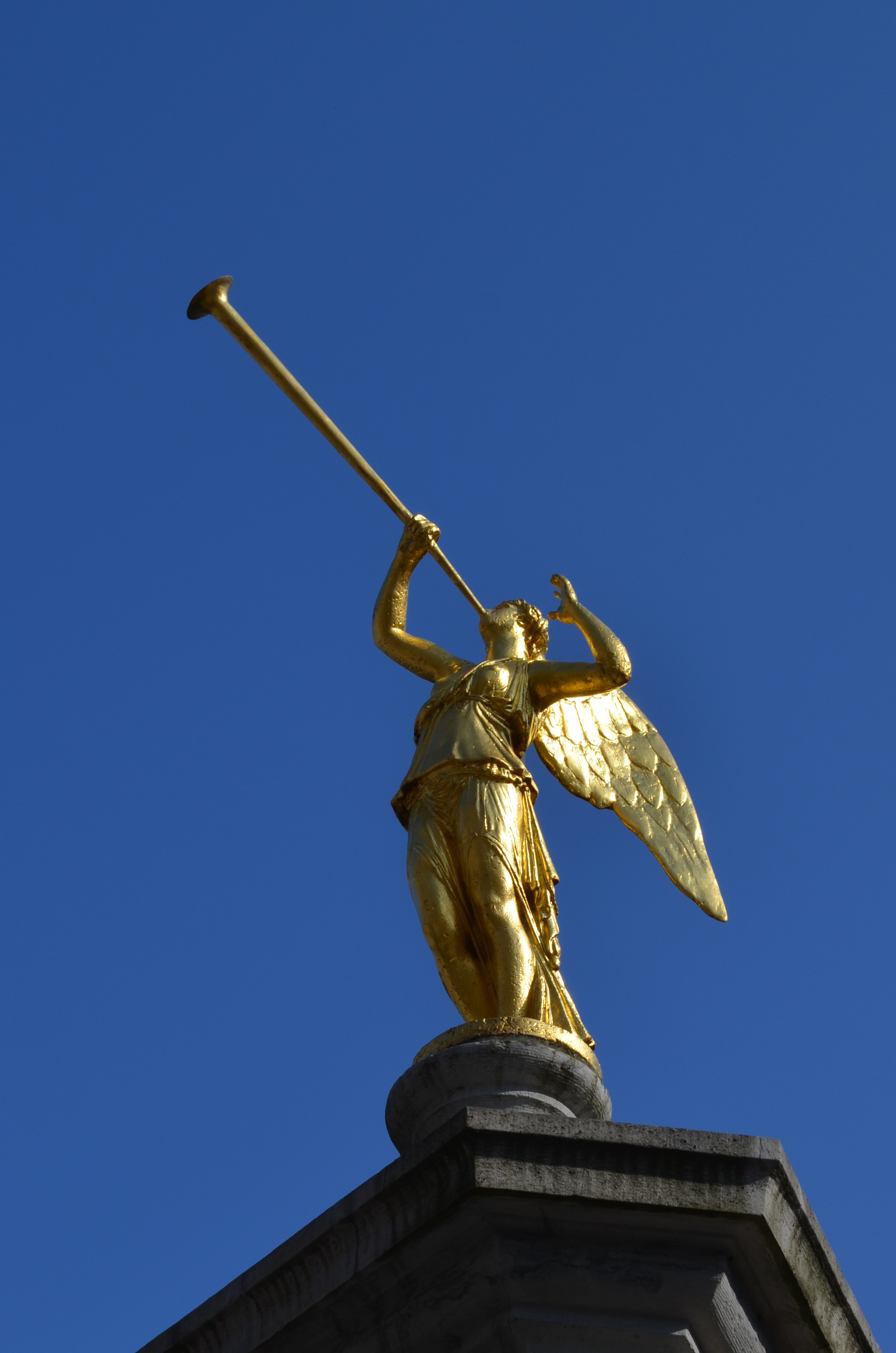
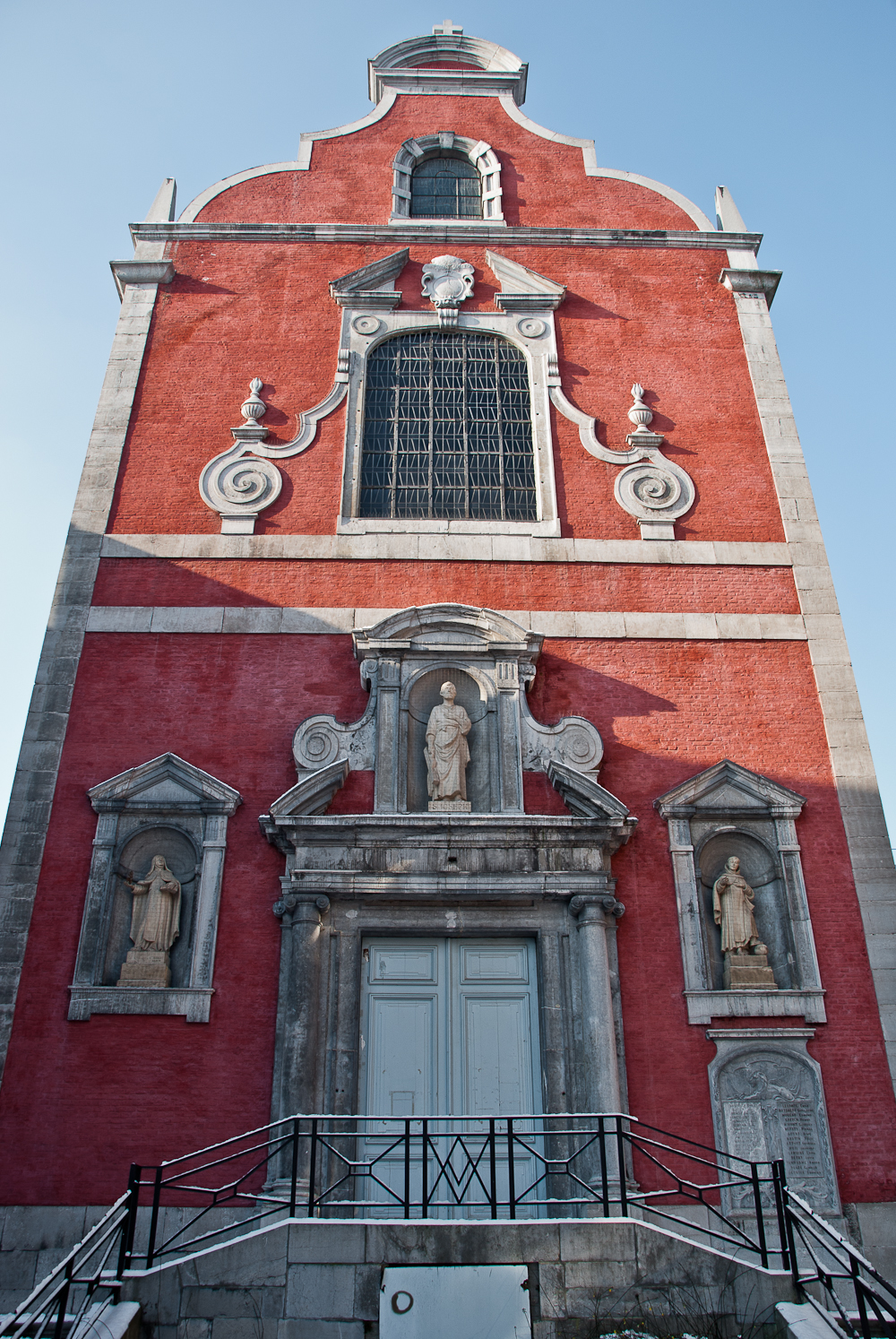
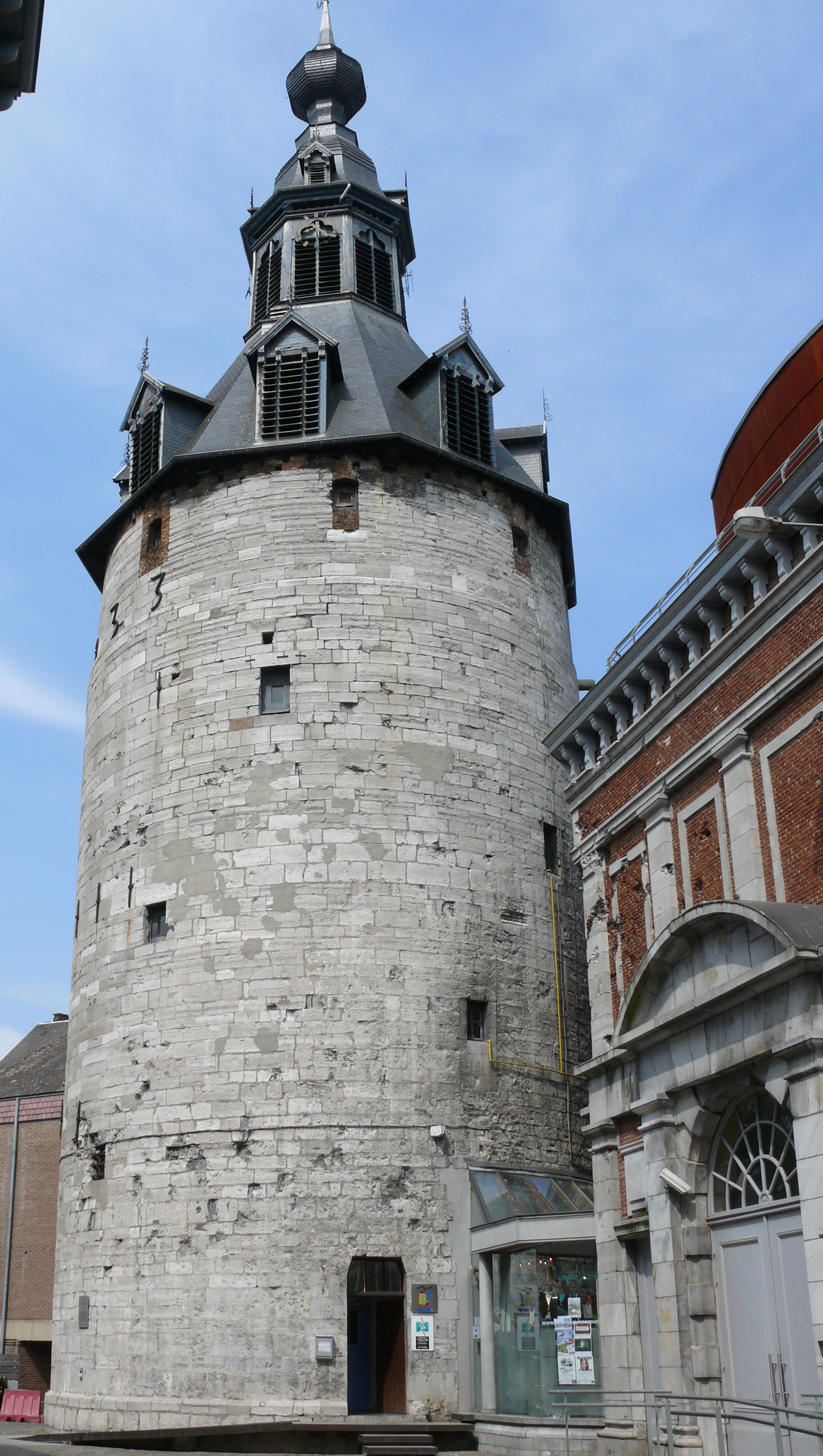
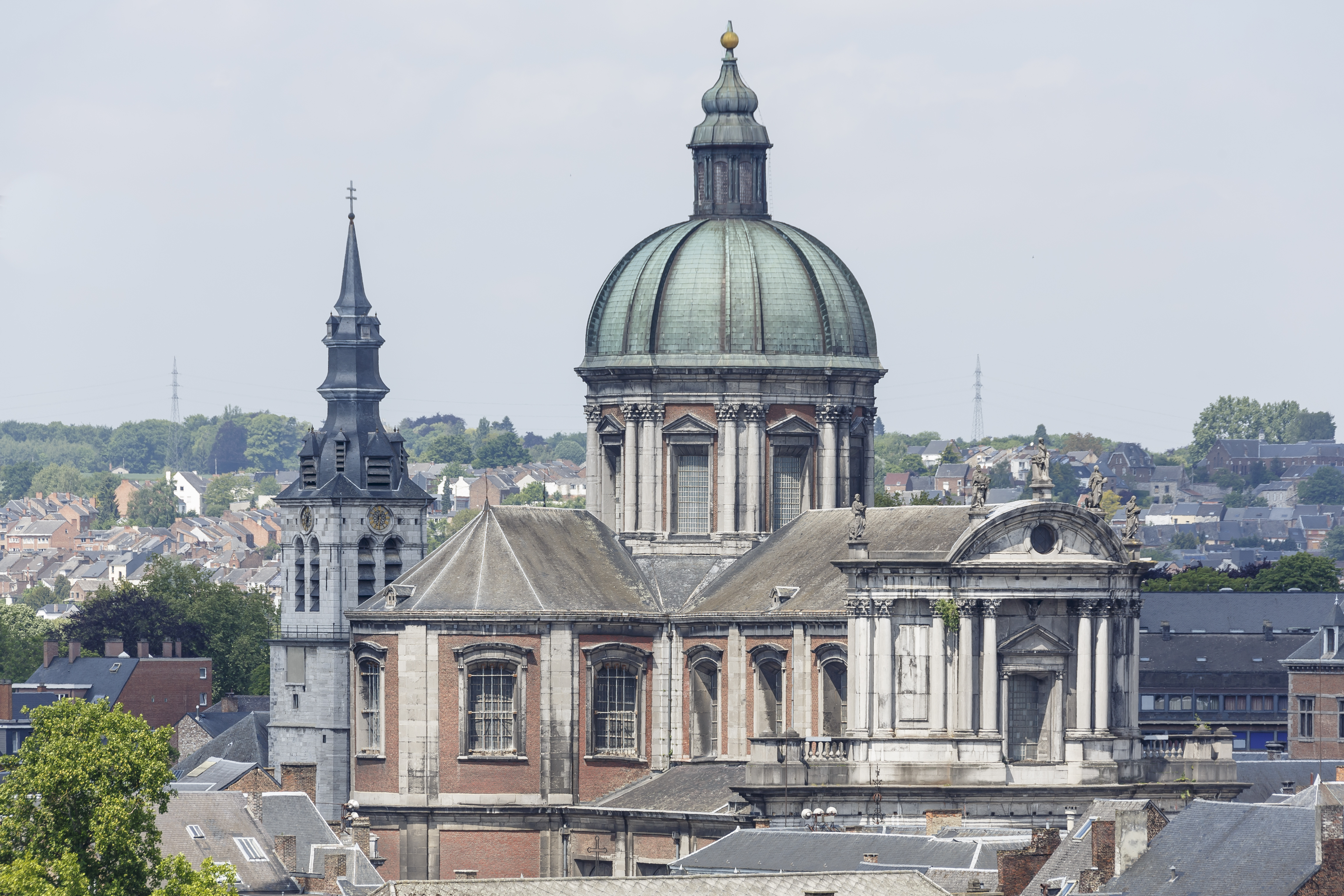
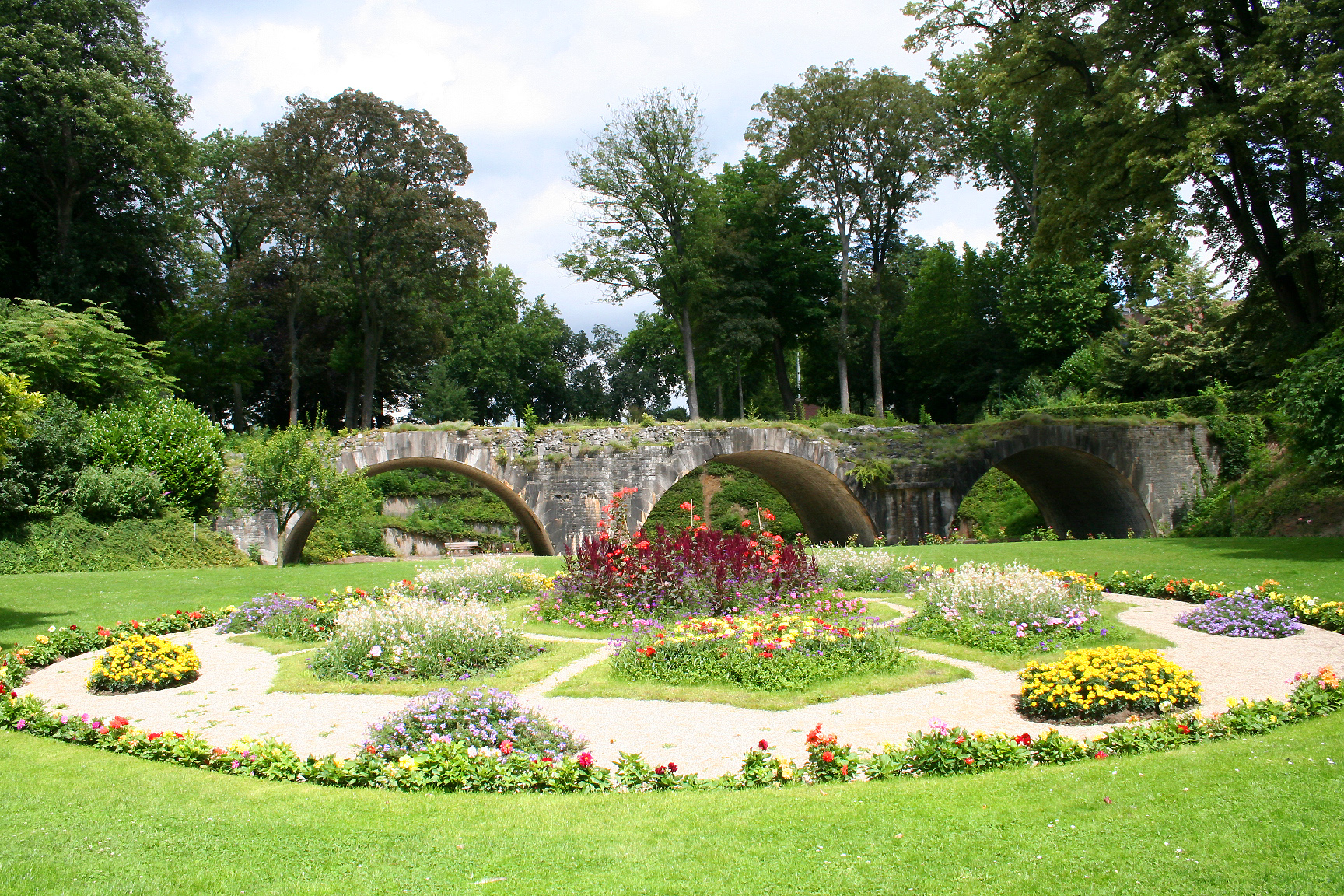
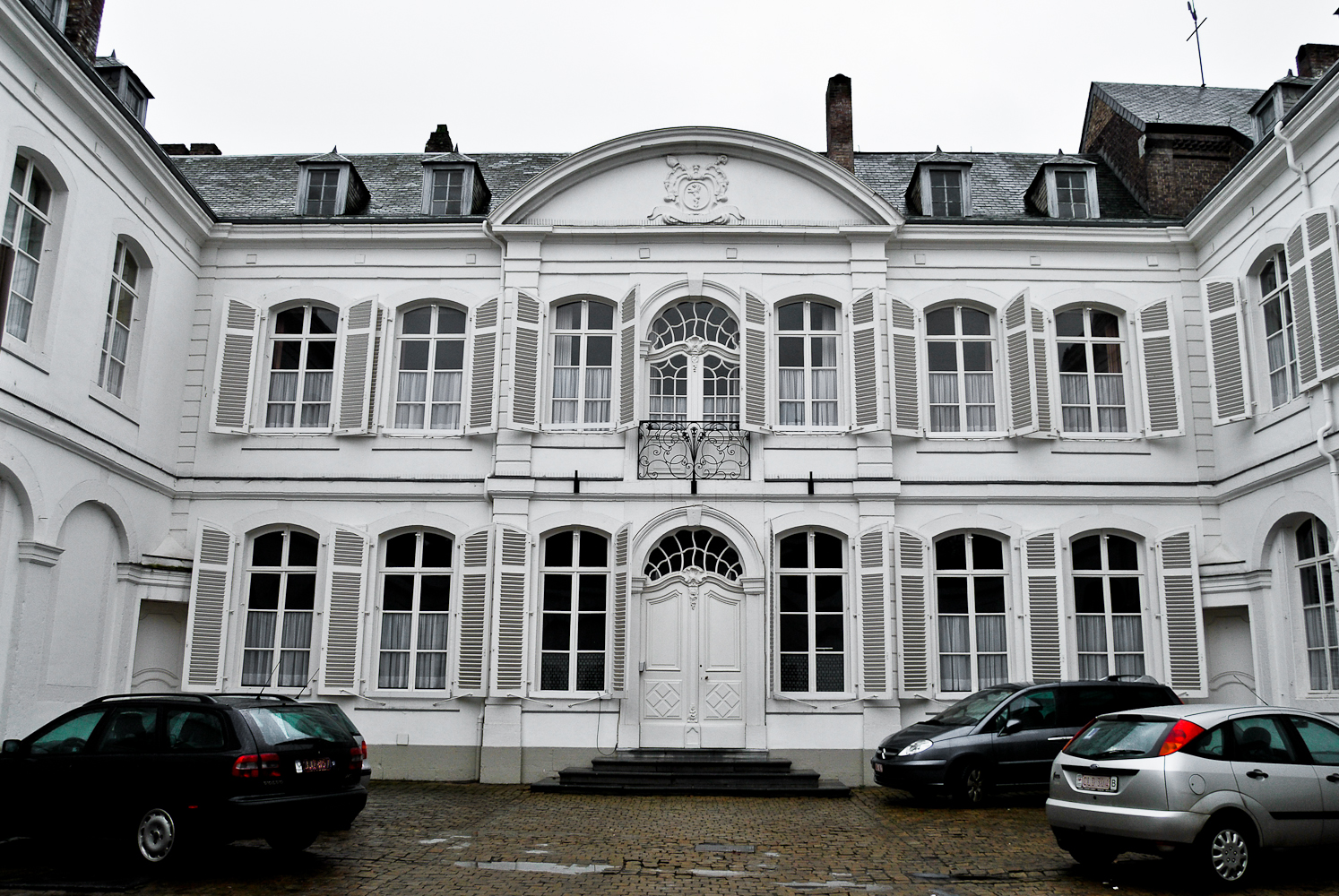
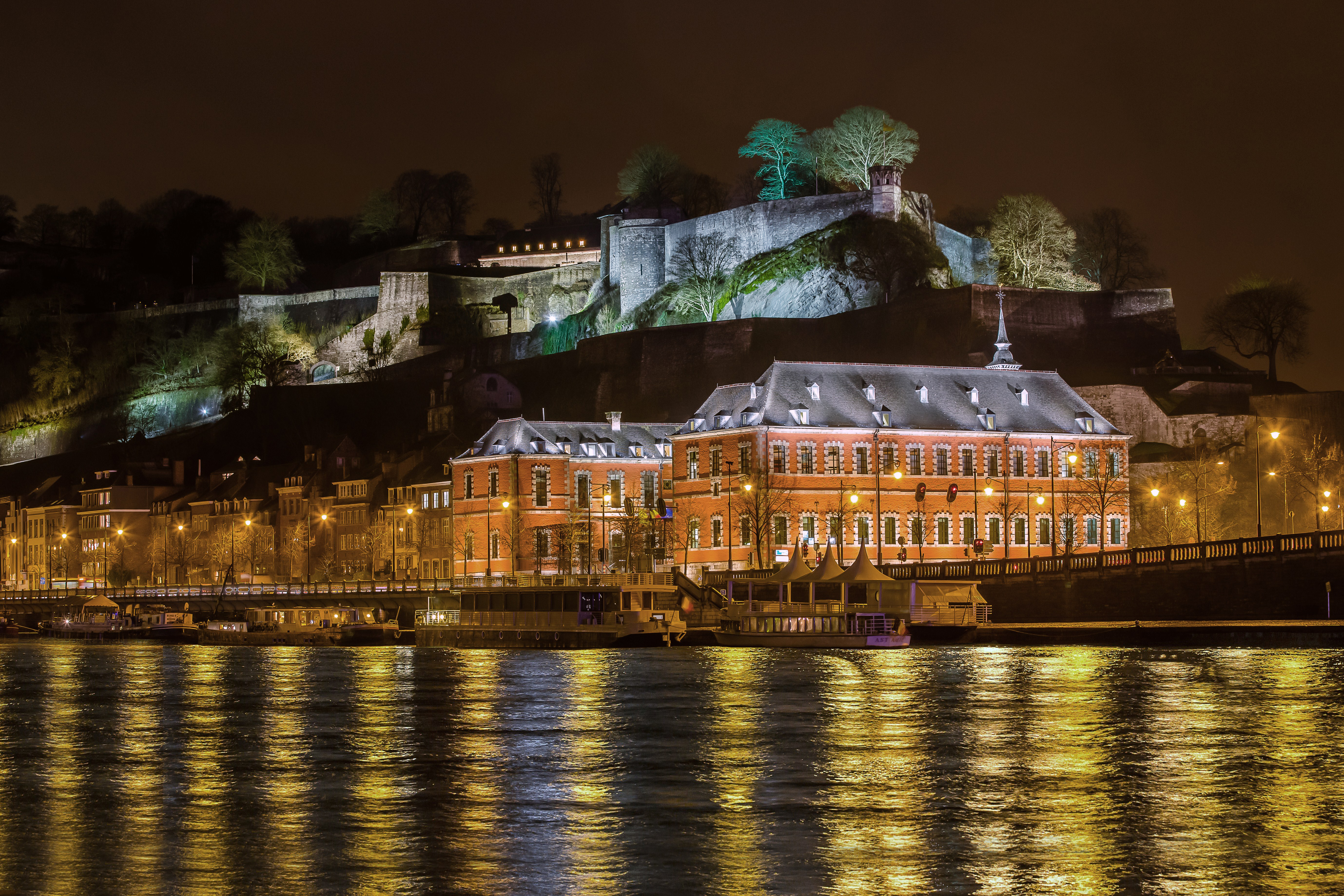
- Namur Old town Angel Fountain Saint Joseph's Church Belfry of Namur St Aubin's Cathedral Louise Marie Park Provincial Palace The Citadel with the Parliament of Wallonia on river Meuse

- Flag Coat of arms

- Location within Arrondissement of Namur (dark grey) and Namur Province
- Interactive map of Namur
- Location in Belgium Namur (Europe)
- Coordinates: 50°28′N 04°52′E
- Country: Belgium
- Community: French Community
- Region: Wallonia
- Province: Namur
- Arrondissement: Namur

Government
  - Mayor: Maxime Prévot, Charlotte Bazelaire (mayor pro tempore) (Les Engagés)
  - Governing party: Les Engagés-MR

Area
  - Total: 175.93 km^{2} (67.93 sq mi)

Population (2026-01-01)
  - Total: 115,330
  - Density: 655.54/km^{2} (1,697.9/sq mi)
- Postal codes: 5000, 5001, 5002, 5003, 5004, 5020, 5021, 5022, 5024, 5100, 5101
- NIS code: 92094
- Area codes: 081
- Website: www.namur.be
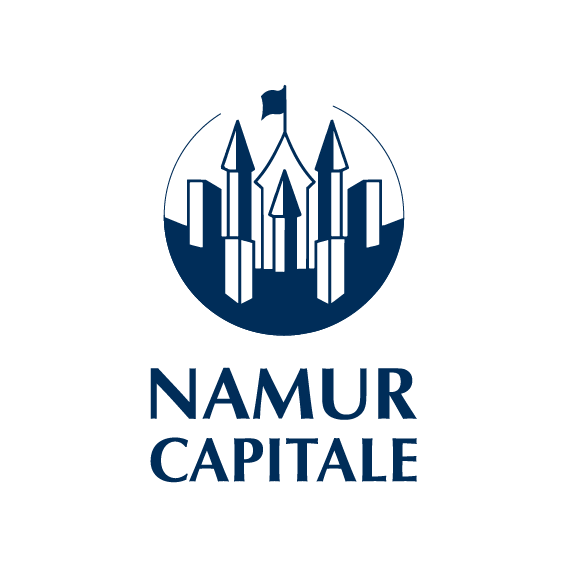
- Brandmark of Namur

Namur (French: [namyʁ]; (Note: Adapted in German as [naˈmyːɐ̯].) Walloon: Nameur; Dutch: Namen [ˈnaːmə(n)]) is a city and municipality in Wallonia, Belgium. It is the capital both of the province of Namur and of Wallonia, hosting the Parliament of Wallonia, the Government of Wallonia and its administration.

Namur stands at the confluence of the rivers Sambre and Meuse and straddles three different regions – Hesbaye to the north, Condroz to the south-east, and Entre-Sambre-et-Meuse to the south-west. The city of Charleroi is located to the west. The language spoken is French.

The municipality consists of the following sub-municipalities: Beez, Belgrade, Boninne, Bouge, Champion, Cognelée, Daussoulx, Dave, Erpent, Flawinne, Gelbressée, Jambes, Lives-sur-Meuse, Loyers, Malonne, Marche-les-Dames, Namur proper, Naninne, Saint-Servais, Saint-Marc, Suarlée, Temploux, Vedrin, Wépion, and Wierde.

== History ==
=== Early history ===
The town began as an important trading settlement in Celtic times, straddling east–west and north–south trade routes across the Ardennes. The Romans established a presence after Julius Caesar defeated the local Aduatuci tribe.

Namur came to prominence during the early Middle Ages when the Merovingians built a castle or citadel on the rocky spur overlooking the town at the confluence of the two rivers. In the 10th century, it became a county in its own right. The town developed somewhat unevenly, as the counts of Namur could only build on the north bank of the Meuse - the south bank was owned by the bishops of Liège and developed more slowly into the town of Jambes (now effectively a suburb of Namur). The medieval rulers of Namur were often also rulers of other counties in the region, including Flanders, Hainaut, and Luxembourg. It was purchased by Duke Philip the Good Duke of Burgundy and Count of Flanders in 1421, joining it into a larger state.

=== 17th–19th centuries ===
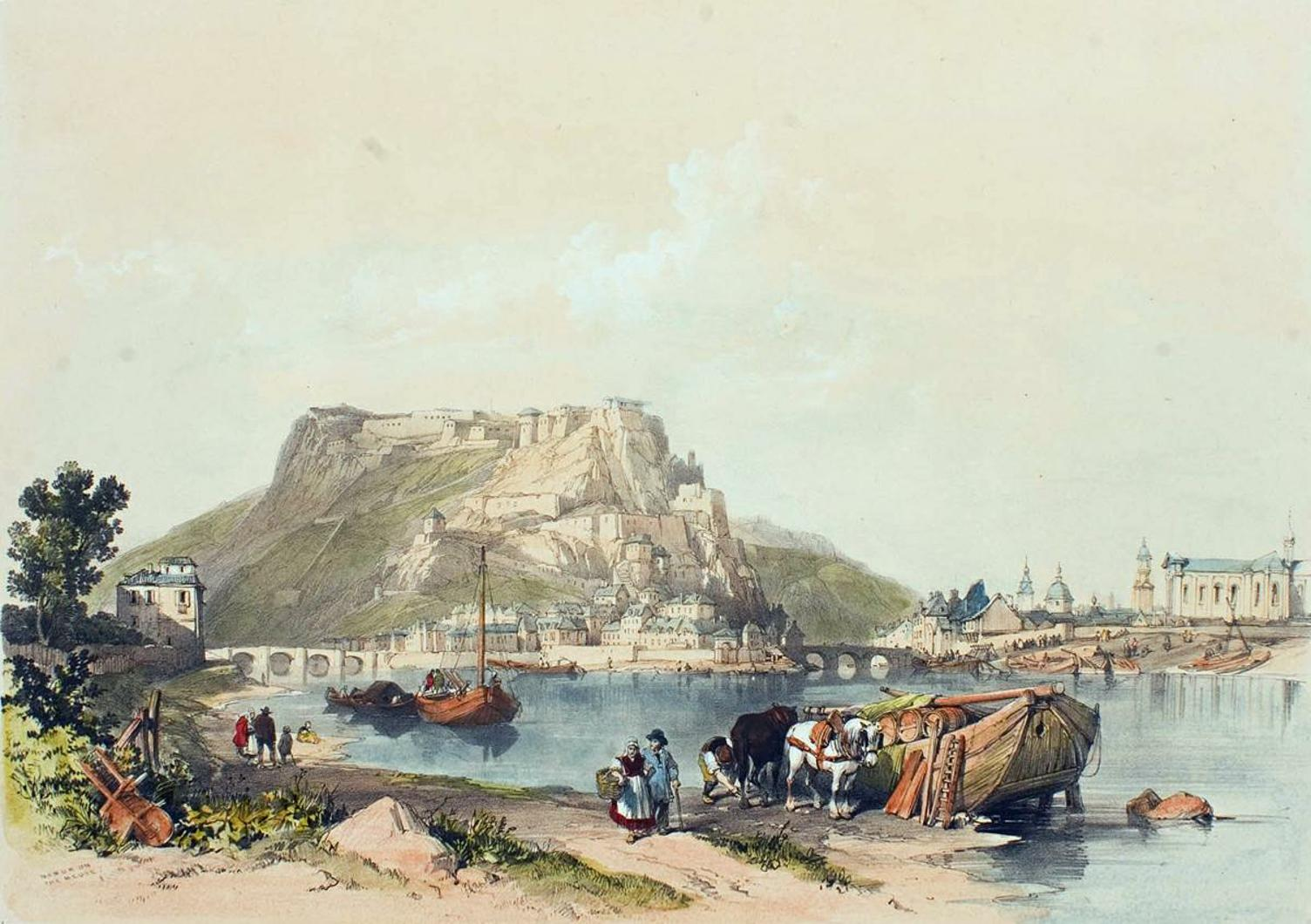
Namur in 1838

In the 1640s, long after Namur became part of the Spanish Netherlands, its citadel was considerably strengthened. Louis XIV of France invaded in 1692, capturing the town and annexing it to France. His renowned military engineer Vauban rebuilt the citadel. French control was short-lived, as William III of Orange-Nassau captured Namur only three years later in 1695 during the War of the Grand Alliance. Under the Barrier Treaty of 1709, the Dutch gained the right to garrison Namur, although the subsequent Treaty of Utrecht of 1713 gave control of the formerly Spanish Netherlands to the Austrian House of Habsburg. Thus, although the Austrians ruled the town, the citadel was controlled by the Dutch. It was rebuilt again under their tenure.

General Jean-Baptiste Cyrus de Valence's column laid siege to the city on 19 November 1792 during the War of the First Coalition and, after 12 days, the city surrendered on 1 December and its whole garrison of 3,000 men was taken prisoner. France invaded the region again in 1794, annexing Namur and imposing a repressive regime. After the defeat of Napoleon in 1815, the Congress of Vienna incorporated what is now Belgium into the United Kingdom of the Netherlands. Belgium broke away from the Netherlands in 1830 following the Belgian Revolution, and Namur continued to be a major garrison town under the new government. The citadel was rebuilt yet again in 1887.

=== 20th–21st centuries ===
In World War I, Namur was a major target of the German invasion of Belgium in 1914, which sought to use the Meuse valley as a route into France. On August 21, 1914, the Germans bombarded the town of Namur without warning. Several people were killed. Despite being billed as virtually impregnable, the citadel fell after only three days' fighting and the town was occupied by the Germans for the rest of the war. Namur fared little better in World War II; it was in the front lines of both the Battle of the Ardennes in 1940 and the Battle of the Bulge in 1944. The town suffered heavy damage in both wars.

Namur continued to host the Belgian Army's paratroopers until their departure in 1977.

After the creation of the Walloon Region, Namur was chosen as the seat of its executive and parliament. In 1986, Namur was officially declared capital of Wallonia. Its position as regional capital was confirmed by the Parliament of Wallonia in 2010.

== Climate ==
Climate data for Namur(1991–2020)
| Month | Jan | Feb | Mar | Apr | May | Jun | Jul | Aug | Sep | Oct | Nov | Dec | Year |
|---|---|---|---|---|---|---|---|---|---|---|---|---|---|
| Mean daily maximum °C (°F) | 5.9 (42.6) | 6.9 (44.4) | 10.8 (51.4) | 15 (59) | 18.6 (65.5) | 21.5 (70.7) | 23.7 (74.7) | 23.4 (74.1) | 19.7 (67.5) | 14.9 (58.8) | 9.7 (49.5) | 6.3 (43.3) | 14.7 (58.5) |
| Daily mean °C (°F) | 3.1 (37.6) | 3.5 (38.3) | 6.4 (43.5) | 9.5 (49.1) | 13.2 (55.8) | 16.2 (61.2) | 18.3 (64.9) | 18 (64) | 14.7 (58.5) | 10.9 (51.6) | 6.6 (43.9) | 3.7 (38.7) | 10.3 (50.6) |
| Mean daily minimum °C (°F) | 0.3 (32.5) | 0.2 (32.4) | 2 (36) | 4 (39) | 7.8 (46.0) | 10.9 (51.6) | 13 (55) | 12.5 (54.5) | 9.6 (49.3) | 6.8 (44.2) | 3.5 (38.3) | 1.2 (34.2) | 6.0 (42.8) |
| Average precipitation mm (inches) | 72.9 (2.87) | 69.6 (2.74) | 59.5 (2.34) | 48 (1.9) | 61.1 (2.41) | 68.1 (2.68) | 75.9 (2.99) | 81.8 (3.22) | 59.6 (2.35) | 65 (2.6) | 67.8 (2.67) | 90.8 (3.57) | 820.1 (32.34) |
Source: Royal meteorological institute

== Economy ==
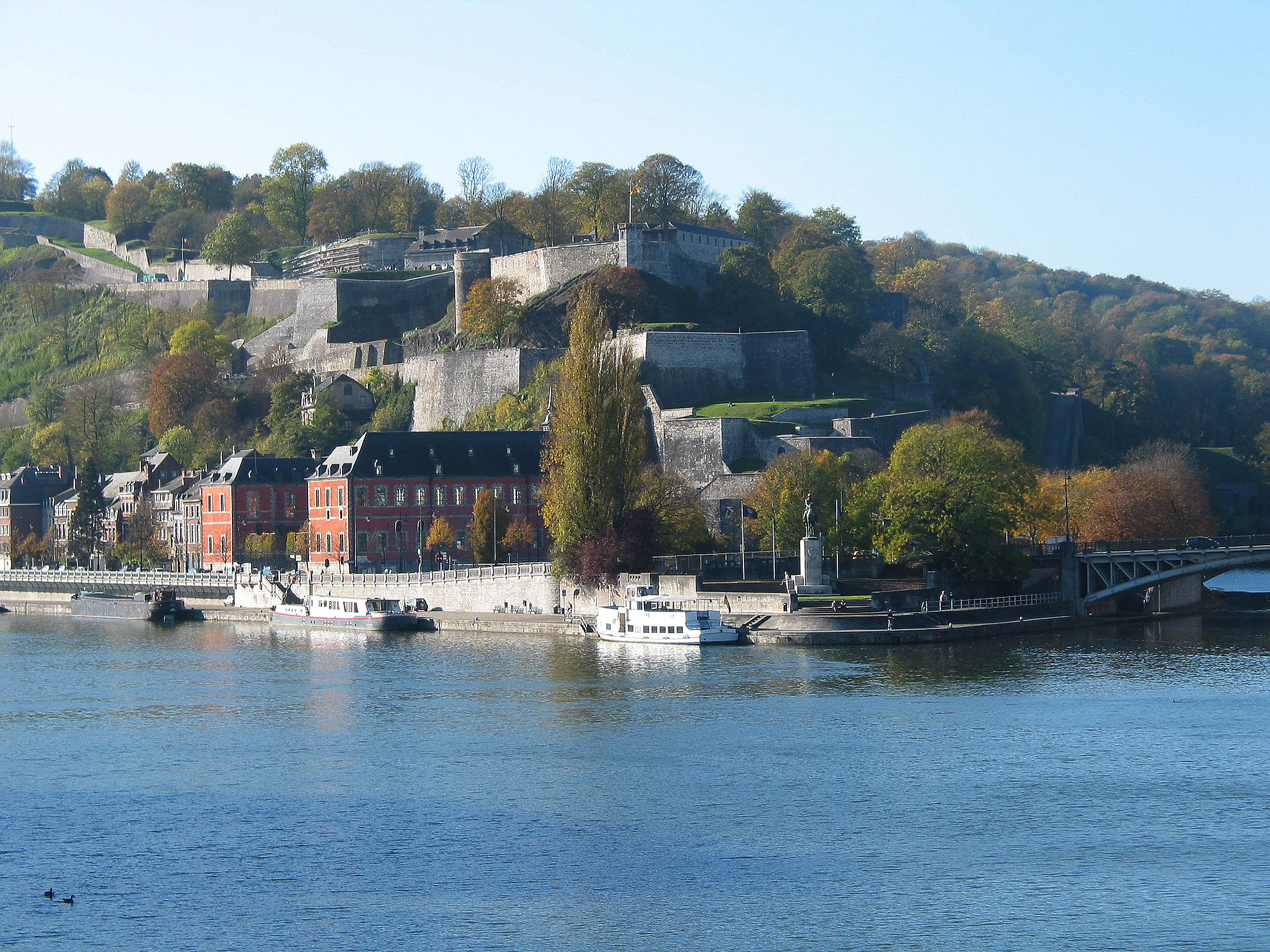
Namur, the Meuse, the Walloon Parliament and the citadel

Namur is an important commercial and industrial centre, located on the Walloon industrial backbone, the Sambre and Meuse valley. It produces machinery, leather goods, metals and porcelain. Its railway station is also an important junction situated on the north–south line between Brussels and Luxembourg City, and the east–west line between Lille and Liège. River barge traffic passes through the middle of the city along the Meuse.

== Culture and sights ==
Namur has taken on a new role as the capital of the federal region of Wallonia. Its location at the head of the Ardennes has also made it a popular tourist centre, with a casino located in its southern district on the left bank of the Meuse.

The town's most prominent sight is the Citadel of Namur, now demilitarised and open to the public. Namur also has a distinctive 18th-century cathedral dedicated to Saint Aubain and a belfry classified by UNESCO as part of the Belfries of Belgium and France which are listed as a World Heritage Site.

The Couvent des Sœurs de Notre-Dame used to contain masterpieces of Mosan art by Hugo d'Oignies, currently presented in the Musée des Arts Anciens (Rue de Fer). Elsewhere there is an archeological museum and a museum dedicated to Félicien Rops.

An odd Namurois custom is the joust on stilts (dating back to 1411) practiced by the stiltwalkers of Namur. The annual Combat de l'Échasse d'Or (Fight for the Golden Stilt), held on the third Sunday in September, is the most important joust of the year. Two teams, the Mélans and the Avresses, dress in medieval clothes while standing on stilts and do battle in one of the town's principal squares. Since 2021, Namur stilt jousts are registered on the UNESCO Representative List of the Intangible Cultural Heritage of Humanity.

Namur is home to the University of Namur, which was established in 1831 under the name Facultés universitaires Notre-Dame de la Paix (FUNDP). The University of Louvain (UCLouvain) also has several facilities in the city through its UCLouvain Namur University Hospital (CHU UCLouvain Namur), the provinces' largest employer.

Since 1986 Namur has been home to the Namur International Festival of French-Speaking Film. A jazz (Nam'in'Jazz) and a rock (Verdur Rock) festival both take place in Namur annually.

Sights near Namur include Maredsous Abbey, Floreffe Abbey, and Annevoie Castle with its surrounding Jardins d'Annevoie.

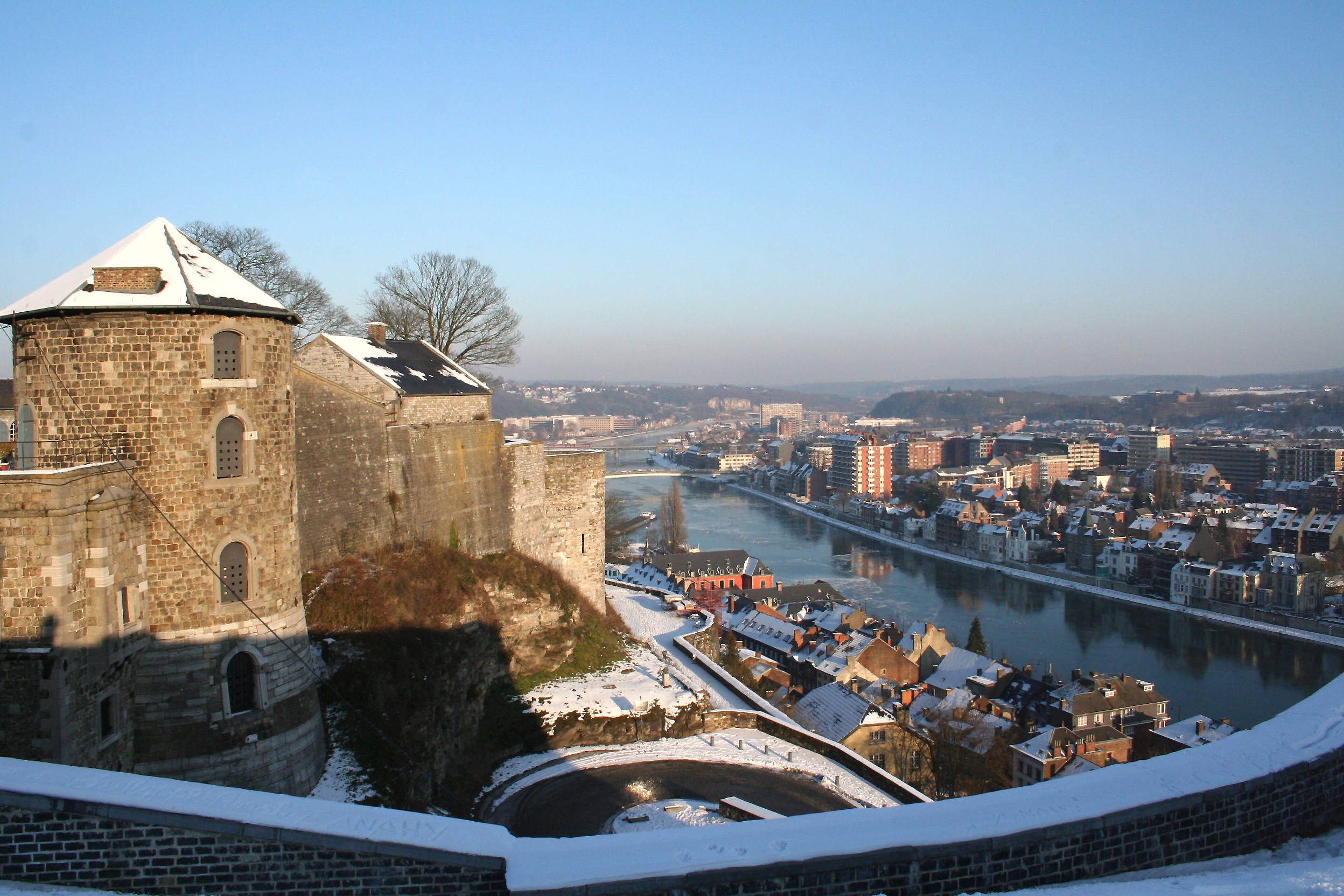
The citadel and the Meuse

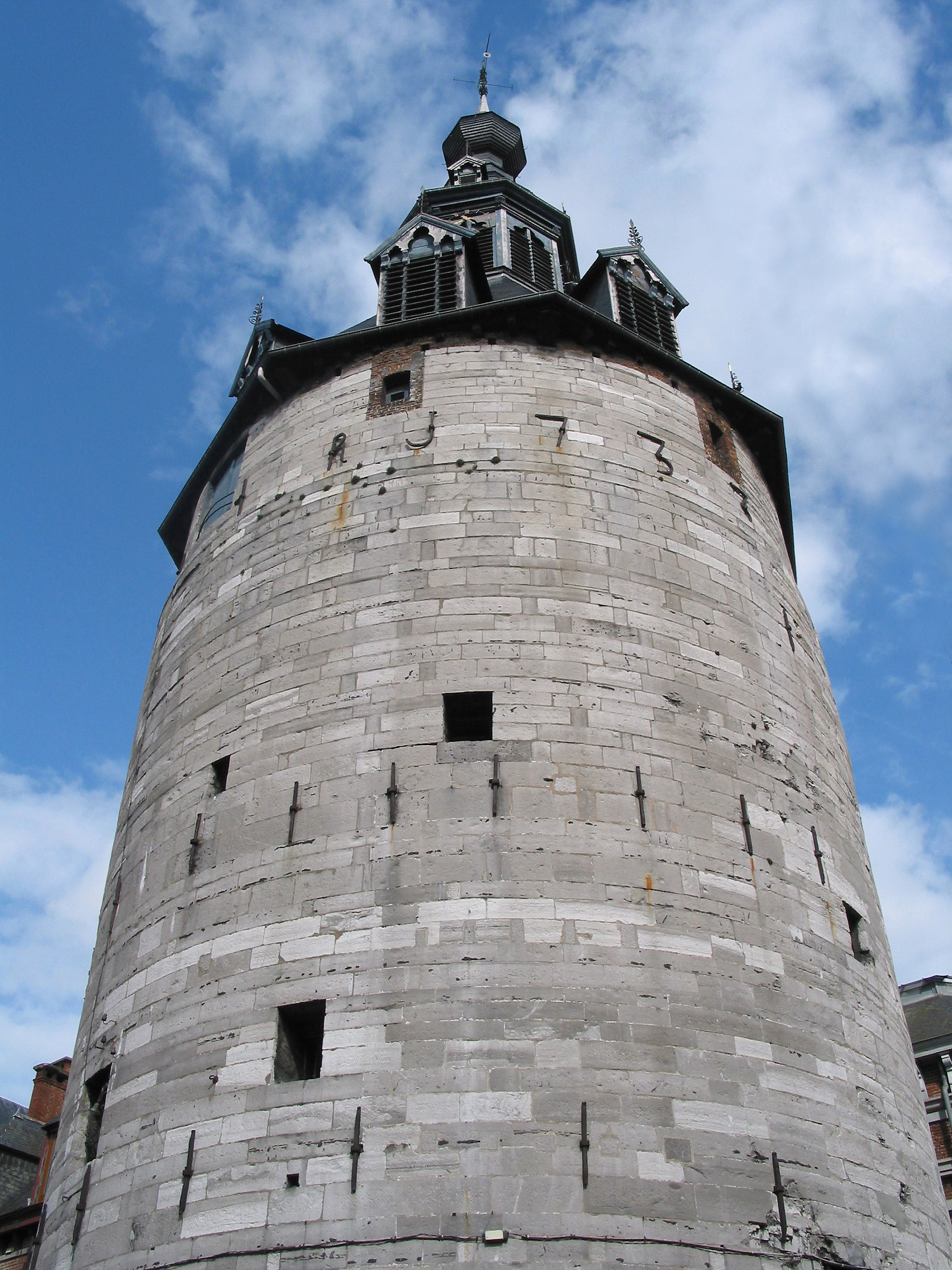
The Belfry of Namur

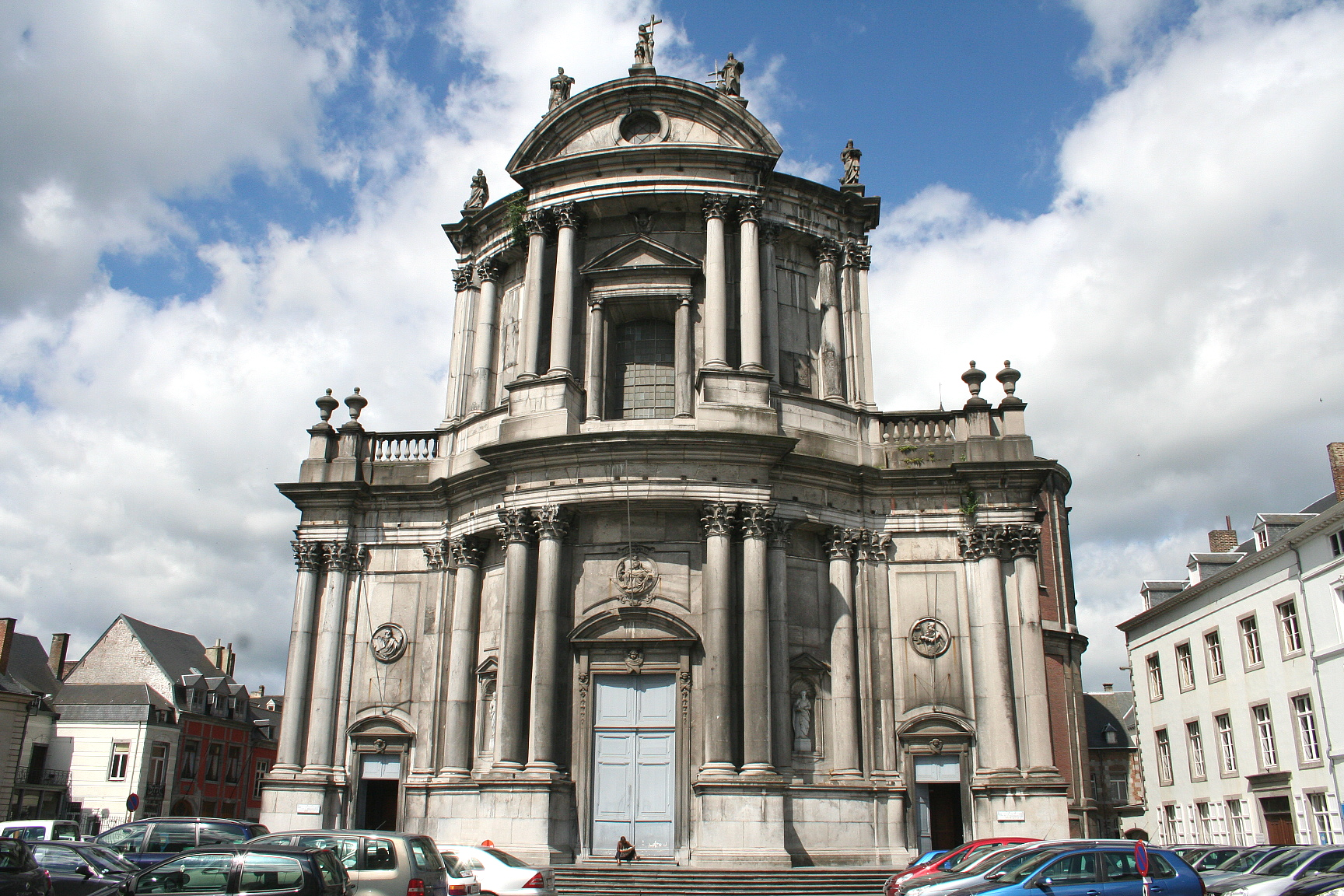
St Aubin's Cathedral is the only academic Late Baroque cathedral in Belgium.

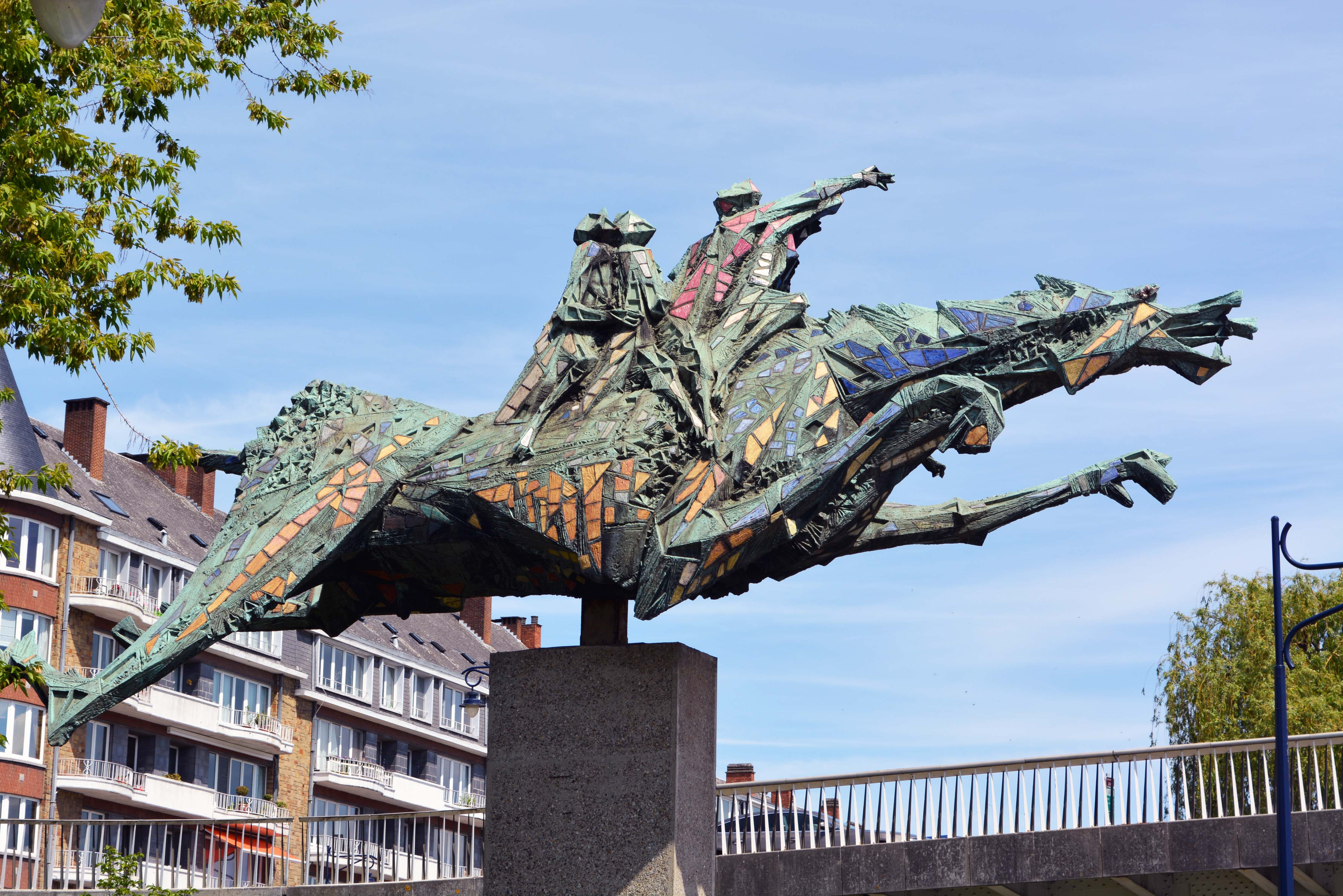
The horse Bayard carrying The Four Sons of Aymon, created by Olivier Strebelle for Expo 58

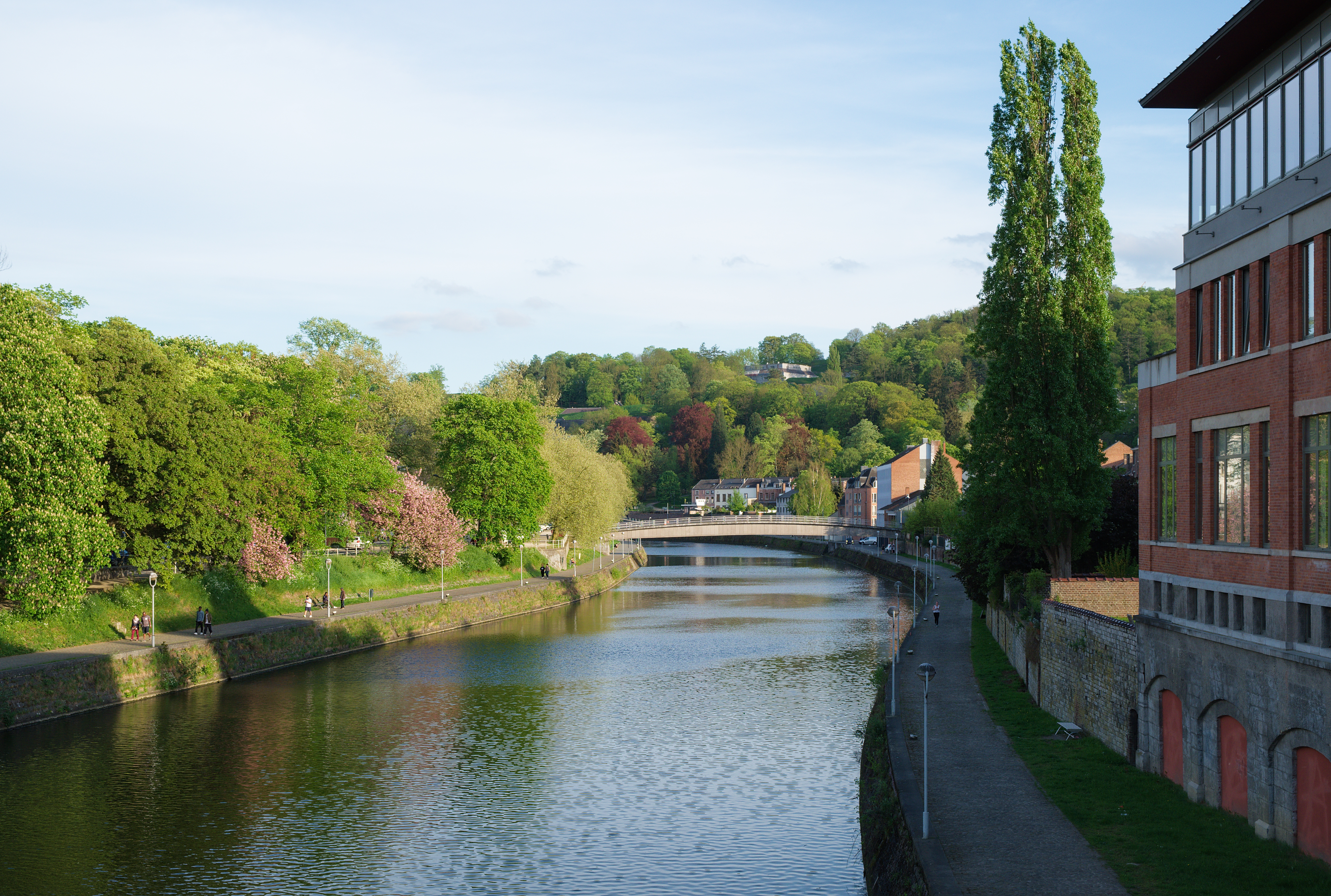
The Sambre

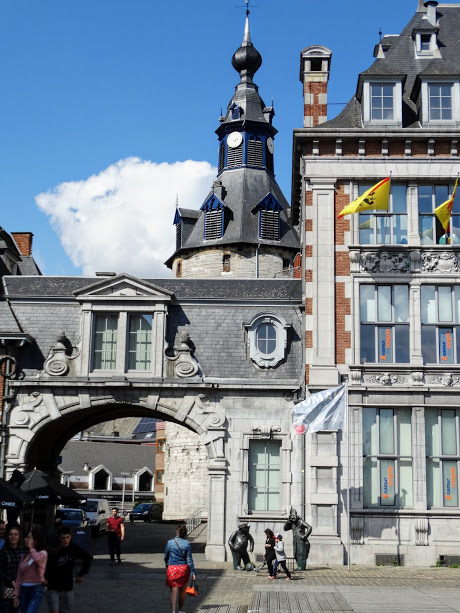
Old town

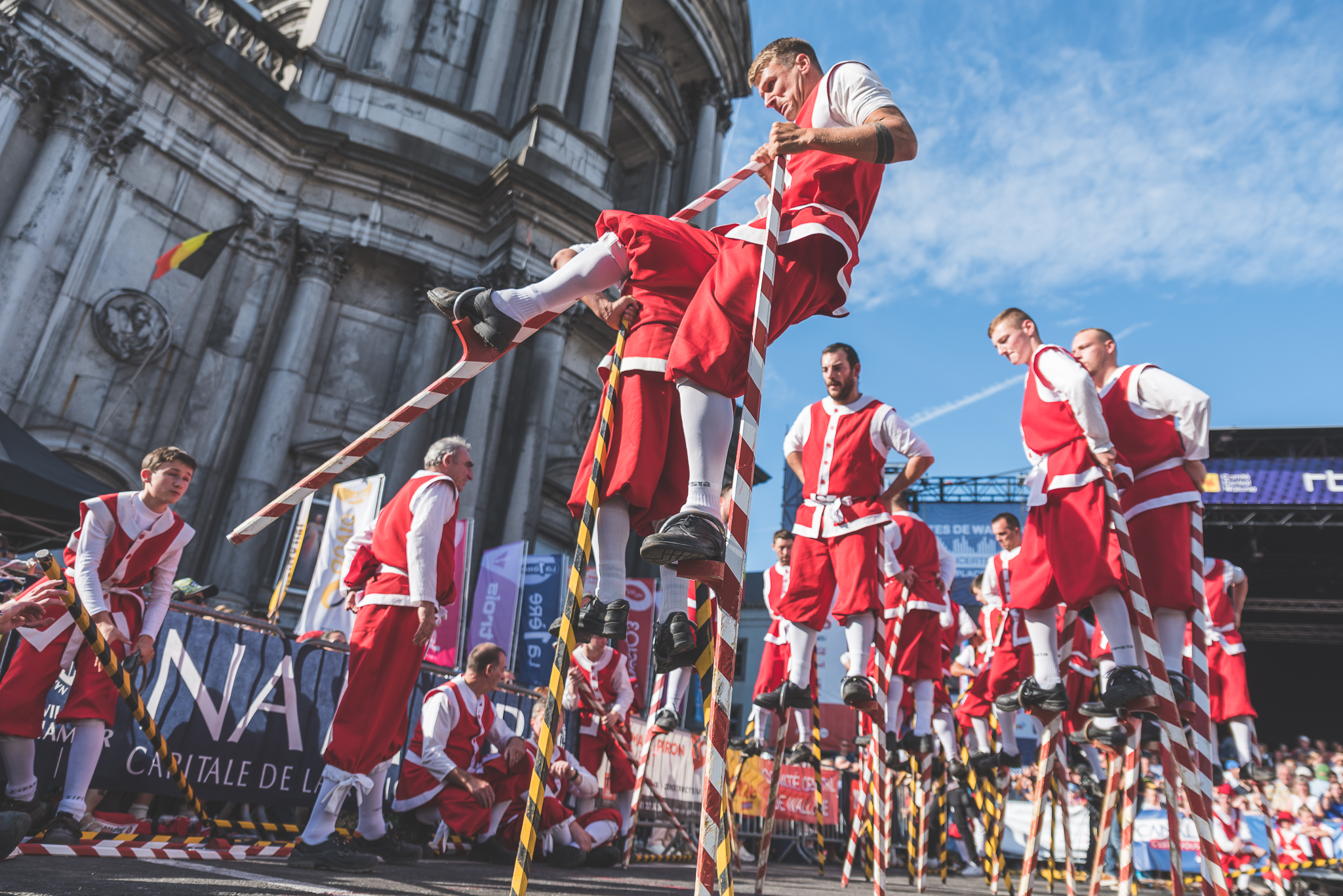
Joust on stilts in Namur. The stiltwalkers fights dates back to 1411.

== Sports ==
The local football team is named Union Royale Namur.

The local baseball team is named Namur Angels.

The annual Namur cyclo-cross race, part of the UCI Cyclo-cross World Cup, takes place on the hills around the citadel. From 1950 to 2007, the Belgian Motocross Grand Prix was held every first weekend in August on a challenging race circuit around the citadel. Between 20,000 and 50,000 spectators gathered to support the Belgian motocross stars such as; Joël Robert, Roger De Coster, Eric Geboers & Stefan Everts. The Namur circuit achieved iconic status and was known as the Monaco of the Motocross World Championships in reference to the prestigious Formula One automobile race.

== Demographics ==
| Group of origin | Year | | Year | | Year | | Year | |
| Group of origin | 2000 | | 2010 | | 2020 | | 2026 | |
| Group of origin | Number | % | Number | % | Number | % | Number | % |
| Belgians with Belgian background | 89,867 | 85,2 | 85,263 | 78,2 | 78,932 | 70,8 | 75,627 | 65,5 |
| Belgians with foreign background | 9,067 | 8,6 | 16,570 | 15,2 | 22,714 | 20,4 | 27,047 | 23,4 |
|---|---|---|---|---|---|---|---|---|
| Neighboring country | 2,102 | 1,99 | 2,661 | 2,44 | 3,173 | 2,84 | 3,498 | 3,03 |
| EU27 (excluding neighboring country) | 3,039 | 2,88 | 4,240 | 3,89 | 5,049 | 4,53 | 5,615 | 4,86 |
| Outside EU 27 | 3,926 | 3,72 | 9,669 | 8,97 | 14,492 | 13.00 | 17,934 | 15,53 |
| Non-Belgians | 6,485 | 6,2 | 7,117 | 6,6 | 9,786 | 8,8 | 12,783 | 11,1 |
| Neighboring country | 1,343 | 1,27 | 1,597 | 1,46 | 2,023 | 1,81 | 2,240 | 1,94 |
| EU27 (excluding neighboring country) | 2,004 | 1,90 | 2,060 | 1,89 | 2,306 | 2,07 | 2,383 | 2,06 |
| Outside EU 27 | 3,138 | 2,97 | 3,460 | 3,17 | 5,457 | 4,90 | 8,160 | 7,08 |
| Total | 105,419 | 100 | 108,950 | 100 | 111,432 | 100 | 115,457 | 100 |

== Twin towns – sister cities ==
Namur is twinned with:

- Bandung, Indonesia
- Quebec City, Quebec, Canada
- Subotica, Serbia
- Bourg-en-Bresse, France
- Ōgaki, Gifu Prefecture, Japan
- Belmont, California, United States
- Lafayette, Louisiana, United States
- Empoli, Tuscany, Italy
- Cluj-Napoca, Cluj, Romania
- Tierp, Sweden
- Pristina, Kosovo

== Notable people ==
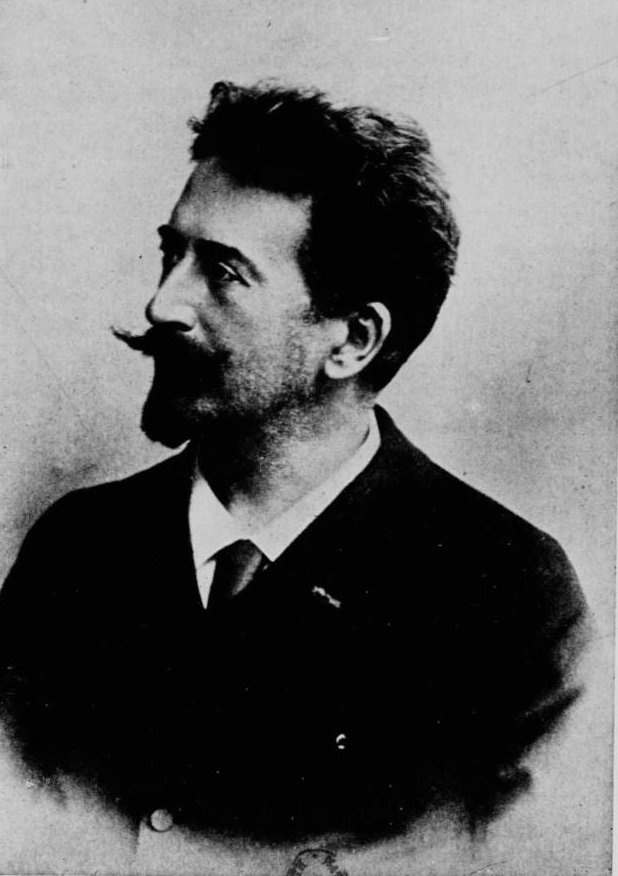
Artist Félicien Rops

- Rémy Belvaux (1966–2006), actor, film director and screenwriter
- Julie Billiart, Canonized saint and Foundress of the Sisters of Notre Dame de Namur, died in Namur in 1816.
- Francy Boland (1929–2005), jazz pianist and arranger
- Louise-Marie Danhaive (1923–1978), novelist, playwright, poet, and journalist
- Antoine d'Ursel, Comet Line leader, acquired the Château du Moisnil in 1939
- Cécile de France (born 1975), actress
- Count Edouard de Woelmont, Belgian Canon.
- Olivier Gourmet (born 1963), actor
- Ludivine Henrion (born 1984), cyclist
- Friedrich Hermann Otto, Prince of Hohenzollern-Hechingen (1776–1838), Prince of Hohenzollern-Hechingen
- Pierre Jonckheer (born 1951), politician, Member of European Parliament 1999–2009
- Denzel Jubitana (born 1999), Football Player
- Philippe Kirsch (born 1947), Canadian jurist and diplomat, former president of the ICC
- Albert Lambert (1893–1942), born in Namur, Resistance fighter against national socialism
- Lorens Lecertua (born 2006), Belgian-Spanish racing driver
- Louis Leloir (1911–1992), Benedictine monk and orientalist
- Benjamin Lessennes (born 1999), racing driver
- Jeanne Maubourg (1873–1953), opera singer, radio actress in Canada
- Henri Michaux (1899–1984), French-speaking poet and painter
- Benoît Poelvoorde (born 1964), actor and comedian
- Jacques François Rosart (1714–1777), engraver of metal type
- Christophe Rochus (born 1978), tennis player
- Olivier Rochus (born 1981), tennis player
- Félicien Rops (1833–1898), graphic artist and illustrator (Symbolism)
- Thierry Zéno (born 1950), director and screenwriter
- Raphaël Liégeois (born 1988), biomedical engineer and Belgian astronaut
- Nafissatou Thiam (born 1994), athlete, 3 gold medals in Heptathlon at the Olympics
- Claire Laffut (born 1994), singer and songwriter

== See also ==
- Rhisnes, Namur, a suburb to the north of the city

== Sources ==
- (in French) Jean-Pol Hiernaux : Namur, capitale de la Wallonie, in Encyclopédie du Mouvement wallon, Tome II, Charleroi, Institut Jules Destrée, 2000, ISBN 2-87035-019-8 (or 2d ed., CD-ROM, 2003, ISBN 2-87035-028-7)
