= Marche-les-Dames =

Sub-municipality of the city of Namur, Belgium

Marche-les-Dames Måtche-les-Dames (Walloon)
- Sub-municipality of Namur
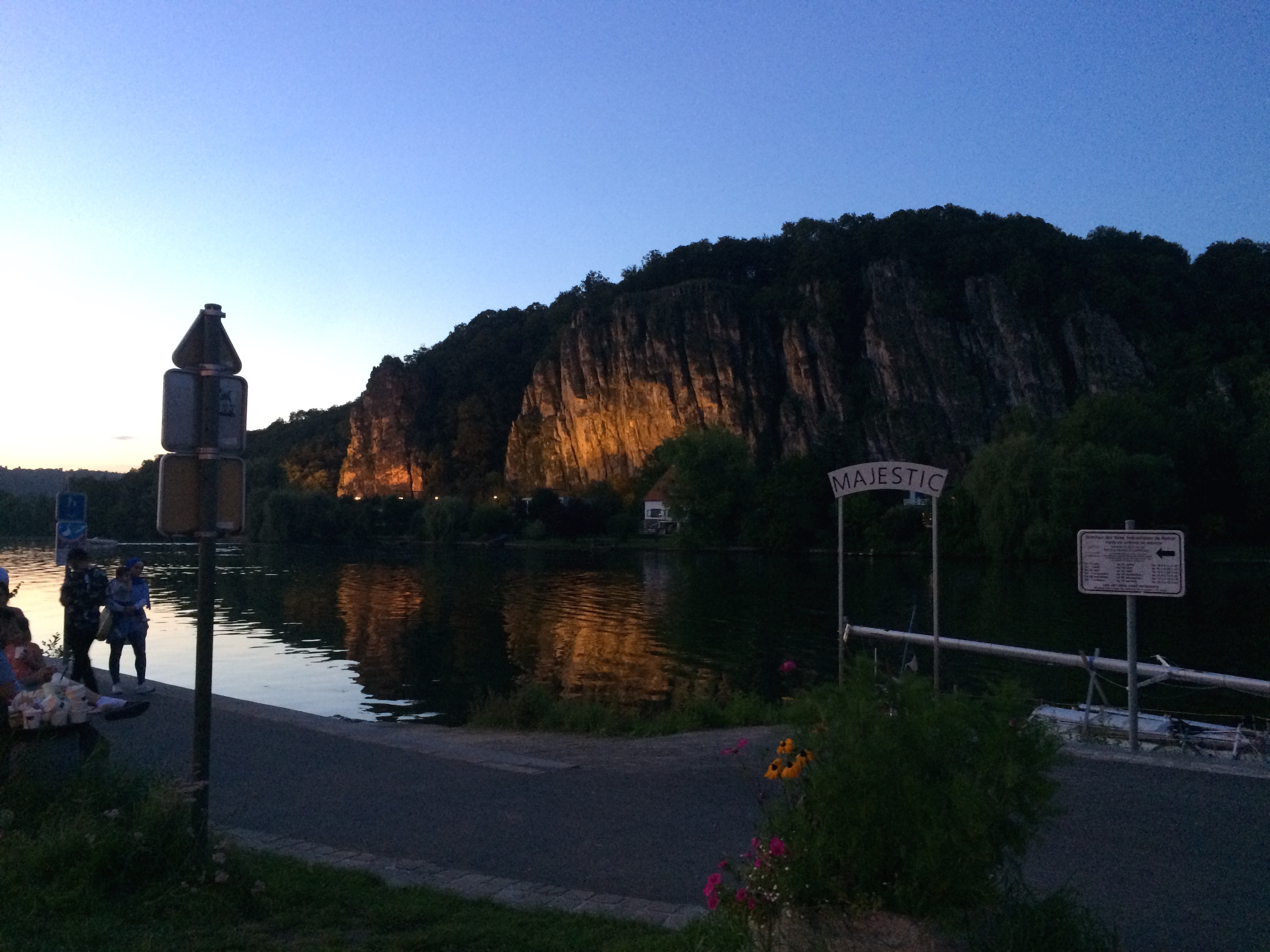
- The rockface across the Meuse river from Marche-les-Dames where Albert I of Belgium drew his last breath

- Location of Marche-les-Dames in Namur
- Interactive map of Marche-les-Dames
- Location within Belgium Location within Namur Province
- Coordinates: 50°29′06″N 4°57′36″E
- Country: Belgium
- Community: French Community
- Region: Wallonia
- Province: Namur
- Arrondissement: Namur
- Municipality: Namur

Area
  - Total: 6.87 km^{2} (2.65 sq mi)

Population (2020-01-01)
  - Total: 1,000
  - Density: 150/km^{2} (380/sq mi)
- Postal codes: 5024
- Area codes: 081

Marche-les-Dames (French pronunciation: [maʁʃ le dam]; Walloon: Måtche-les-Dames) is a sub-municipality of the city of Namur located in the province of Namur, Wallonia, Belgium. It was a separate municipality until 1977. On 1 January 1977, it was merged into Namur.

It is located downstream of the Sambre confluence, on the left bank of the Meuse river. Because of the high cliffs this place is popular with rock climbers.

== History ==
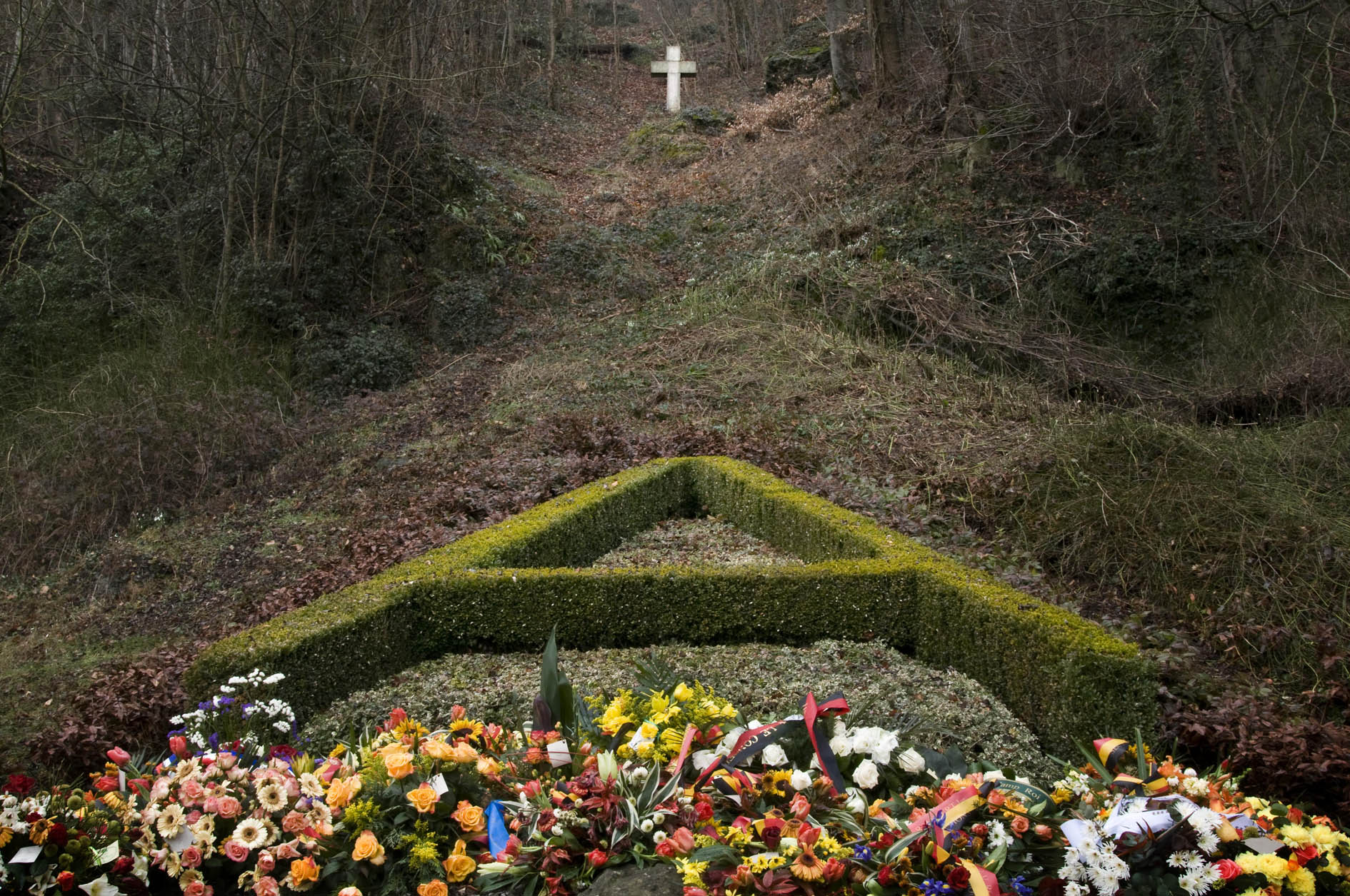
Albert I monument

King Albert I died here in a 1934 mountaineering accident. The King fell from a rock face and his dead body was found later. At this site a memorial was erected to honour the king.

== Movies shot at Marche-les-Dames ==
- 2009: Sister Smile de Stijn Coninx
- 2012: La Marque Des Anges de Sylvain White
- 2015: Public Enemy (TV series) de Matthieu Frances et Gary Seghers
- 2018: The Crimson Rivers (TV series) - The episodes 'Story of Darkness' Part 1 & 2 of season 1 were shot at the Notre-Dame du Vivier abbey

== See also ==
- Cliffs of Marche-les-Dames
