= Belfry of Namur =

Medieval tower and UNESCO World Heritage Site in Namur, Belgium

UNESCO World Heritage Site
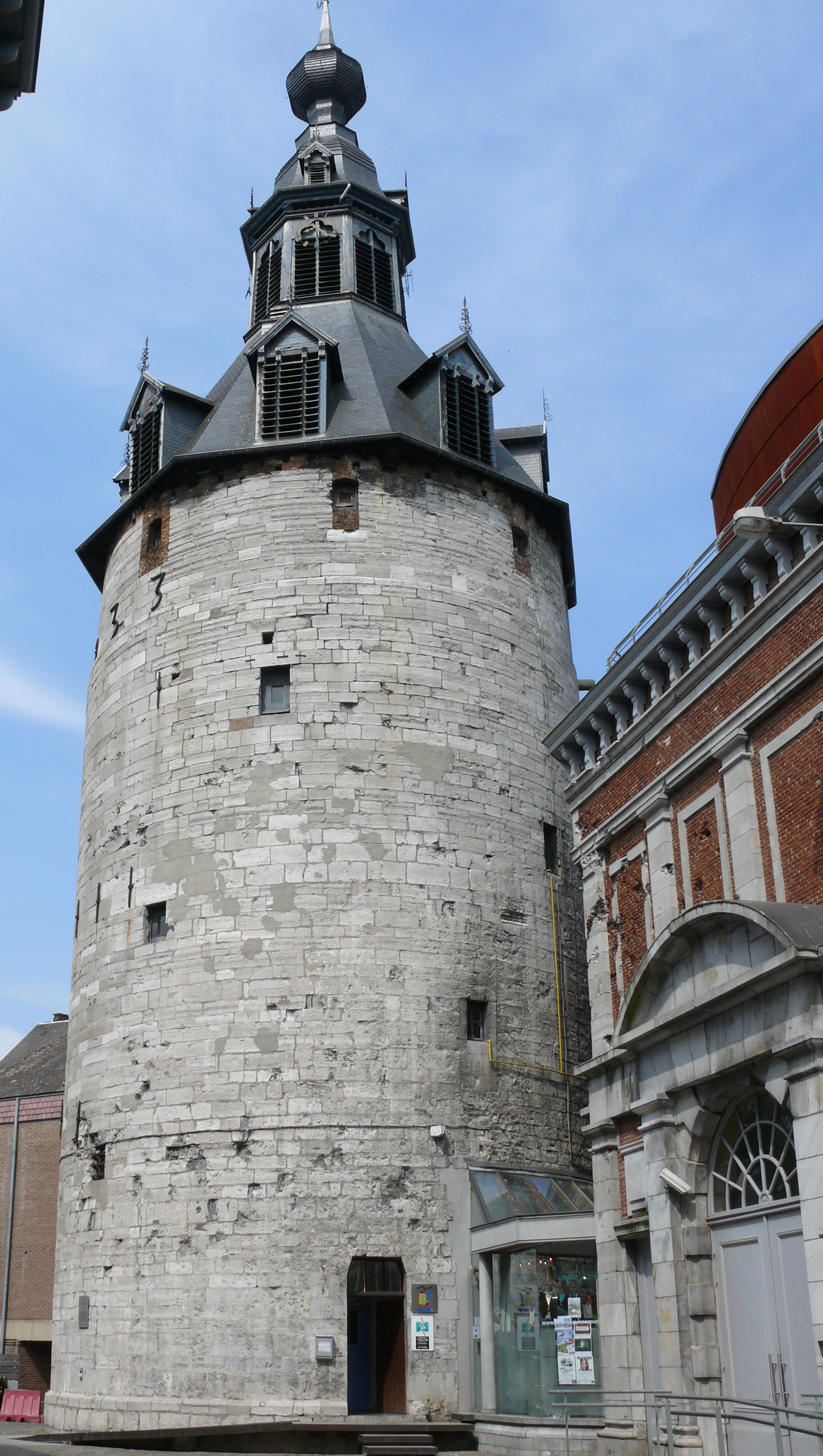
- Belfry of Namur

- Location within Belgium
- Location: Namur, Belgium
- Part of: Belfries of Belgium and France
- Criteria: Cultural: (ii), (iv)
- Reference: 943bis-008
- Inscription: 1999 (23rd Session)
- Extensions: 2005
- Area: 0.182 ha (0.45 acres)
- Buffer zone: 700 ha (1,700 acres)
- Coordinates: 50°27′50″N 4°52′01″E

The Belfry of Namur (French: Beffroi de Namur), also called the Tour Saint-Jacques ("Saint Jacob's Tower"), is an historical building in Namur, Belgium. The tower, constructed in 1388 as part of the city wall, became a belfry in 1746. It is one of the 56 belfries of Belgium and France classified by UNESCO as a World Heritage Site because of their importance as a representation of civic architecture in Europe and their testimony to the rising and influence of the city.

== History ==
Originally, one of the clocks of the Saint-Pierre-au-Château church served as belfry for the citizens of Namur, indicating the time and announcing events in the city. After the destruction of the church, burned down during the siege of Namur in 1745, the Tour Saint-Jacques, the oldest of the three towers of the medieval city walls, became the city belfry. The Tour Saint-Jacques protected one of the city gates. From 1570, its bancloque (belfry clock) gave the signal for the opening and closure of the external city gates.

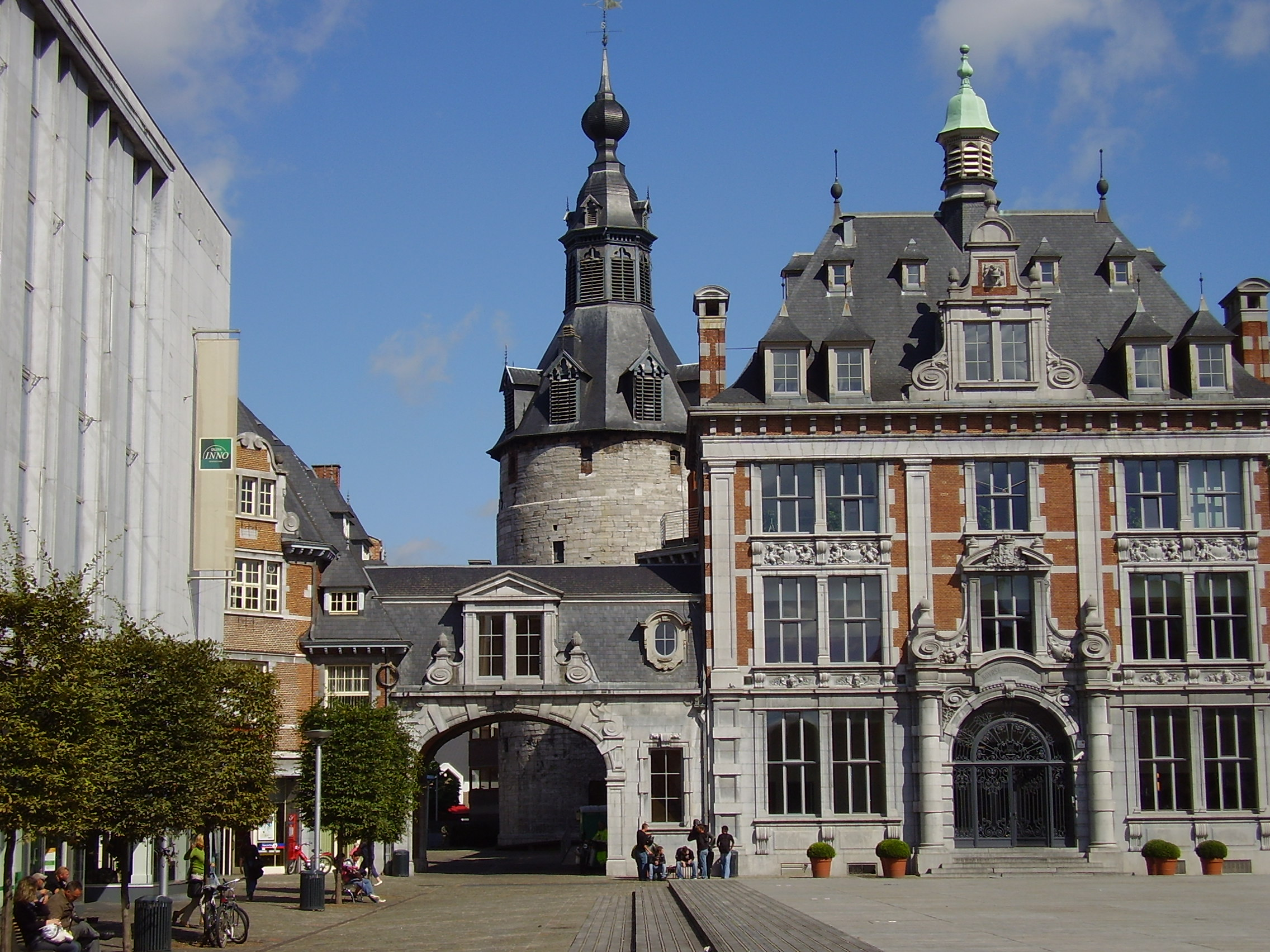
The belfry, behind Namur's old Chamber of Commerce

At the beginning of the 18th century, the city wall was demolished but the Tour Saint-Jacques was preserved and restored, and its clock was covered by an octagonal structure. This entire part was lifted upon a clock bulb. The Tour Saint-Jacques became Namur's city belfry in 1746. Thus the Belfry of Namur is a military defence tower reallocated to civil use.
