= Saint-Servais, Namur =

Sub-municipality of the city of Namur, Belgium

Saint-Servais Sint-Serwai (Walloon)
- Sub-municipality of Namur
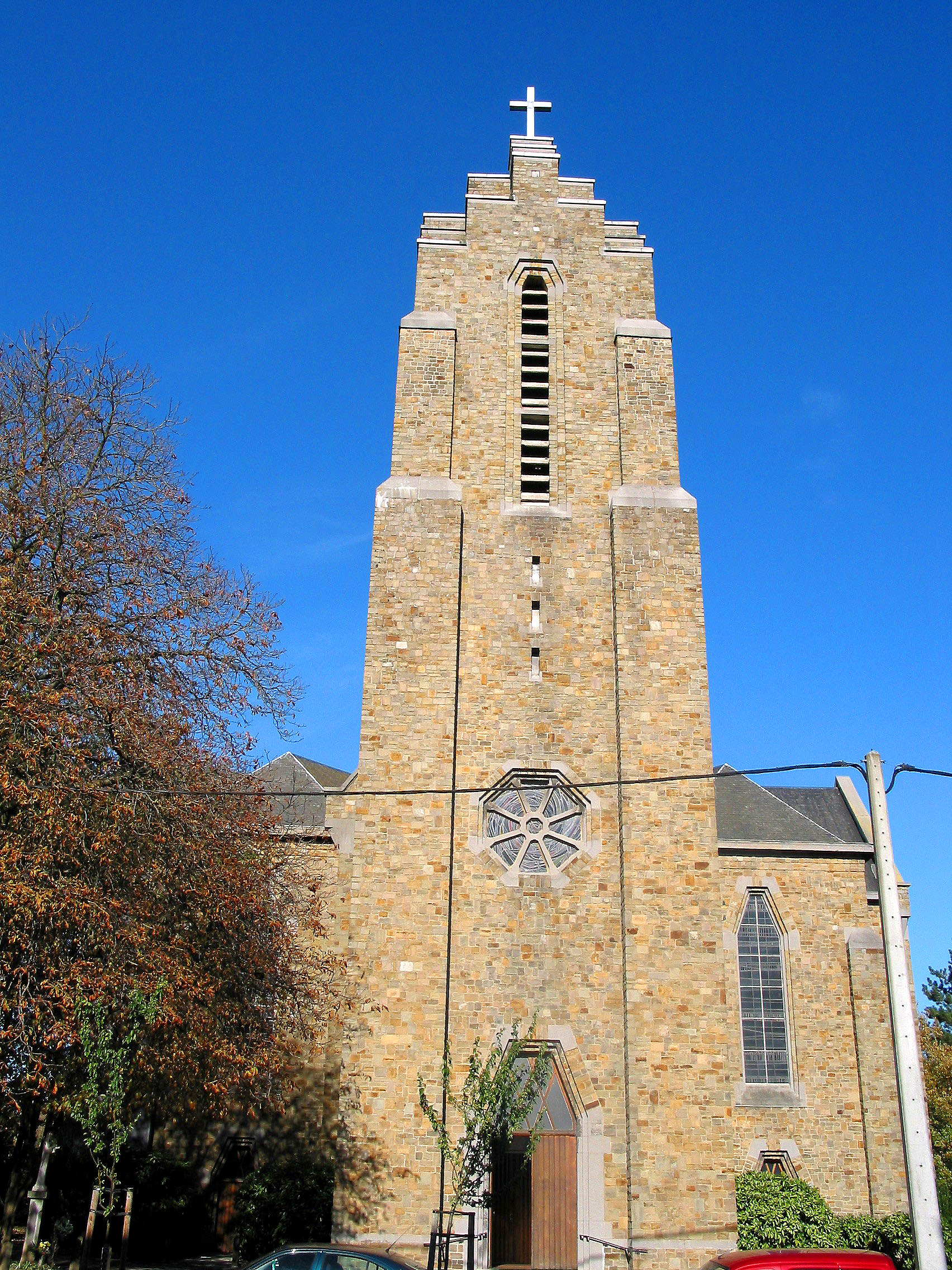
- Sacred Heart Church

- Location of Saint-Servais in Namur
- Interactive map of Saint-Servais
- Location within Belgium Location within Namur Province
- Coordinates: 50°28′00″N 4°50′00″E
- Country: Belgium
- Community: French Community
- Region: Wallonia
- Province: Namur
- Arrondissement: Namur
- Municipality: Namur

Area
  - Total: 3.67 km^{2} (1.42 sq mi)

Population (2020-01-01)
  - Total: 9,588
  - Density: 2,610/km^{2} (6,770/sq mi)
- Postal codes: 5002
- Area codes: 081

Saint-Servais (French pronunciation: [sɛ̃ sɛʁvɛ]; Walloon: Sint-Serwai) is a sub-municipality of the city of Namur located in the province of Namur, Wallonia, Belgium. It was a separate municipality until 1977. On 1 January 1977, it was merged into Namur.
