= Goyet =

Goyet may refer to:

== People ==
Goyet is a French surname. Notable people with the surname include:

- Eugène Goyet (1798—1857), French painter, son of Jean-Baptiste Goyet, husband of Zoé Goyet
- Jean-Baptiste Goyet (1779—1854), French painter, father of Eugène Goyet
- Zoé Goyet (died 8 July 1869), French painter, wife of Eugène Goyet

== Places ==
- Goyet (place), a hamlet in Belgium
- Goyet Caves, located near Goyet, Belgium
