= Gesves =

Municipality in Wallonia, Belgium

Gesves Djeve (Walloon)
- Municipality
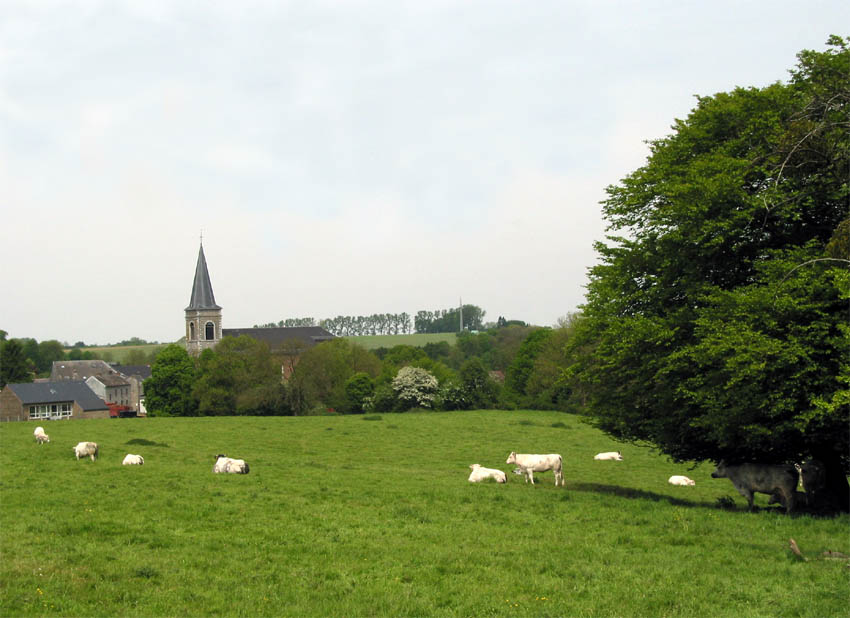

- Flag Coat of arms

- Location of Gesves in Namur Province
- Interactive map of Gesves
- Location in Belgium
- Coordinates: 50°24′N 05°04′E
- Country: Belgium
- Community: French Community
- Region: Wallonia
- Province: Namur
- Arrondissement: Namur

Government
  - Mayor: Martin Van Audenrode
  - Governing party: RPG plus

Area
  - Total: 65.03 km^{2} (25.11 sq mi)

Population (2018-01-01)
  - Total: 7,210
  - Density: 111/km^{2} (287/sq mi)
- Postal codes: 5340
- NIS code: 92054
- Area codes: 083
- Website: www.gesves.be

Gesves (French: [ʒɛv]; Walloon: Djeve) is a municipality of Wallonia located in the province of Namur, Belgium.

The municipality consists of the following districts: Faulx-les-Tombes, Gesves, Haltinne, Mozet, and Sorée. It also includes the hamlets of Gramptinne, Goyet (site of glacial remnants of Neanderthals), Haut-Bois, and Strud (site where fossil of Strudiella devonica, a Late Devonian insect, was discovered).

On 1 January 2006 the municipality had 6,321 inhabitants. The total area is 64.92 km^{2}, giving a population density of 97 inhabitants per km^{2}. On 1 December 2019, the population had grown to 7,246 inhabitants (3,612 men and 3,634 women), representing a growth of 14.63% over the course of 13 years.

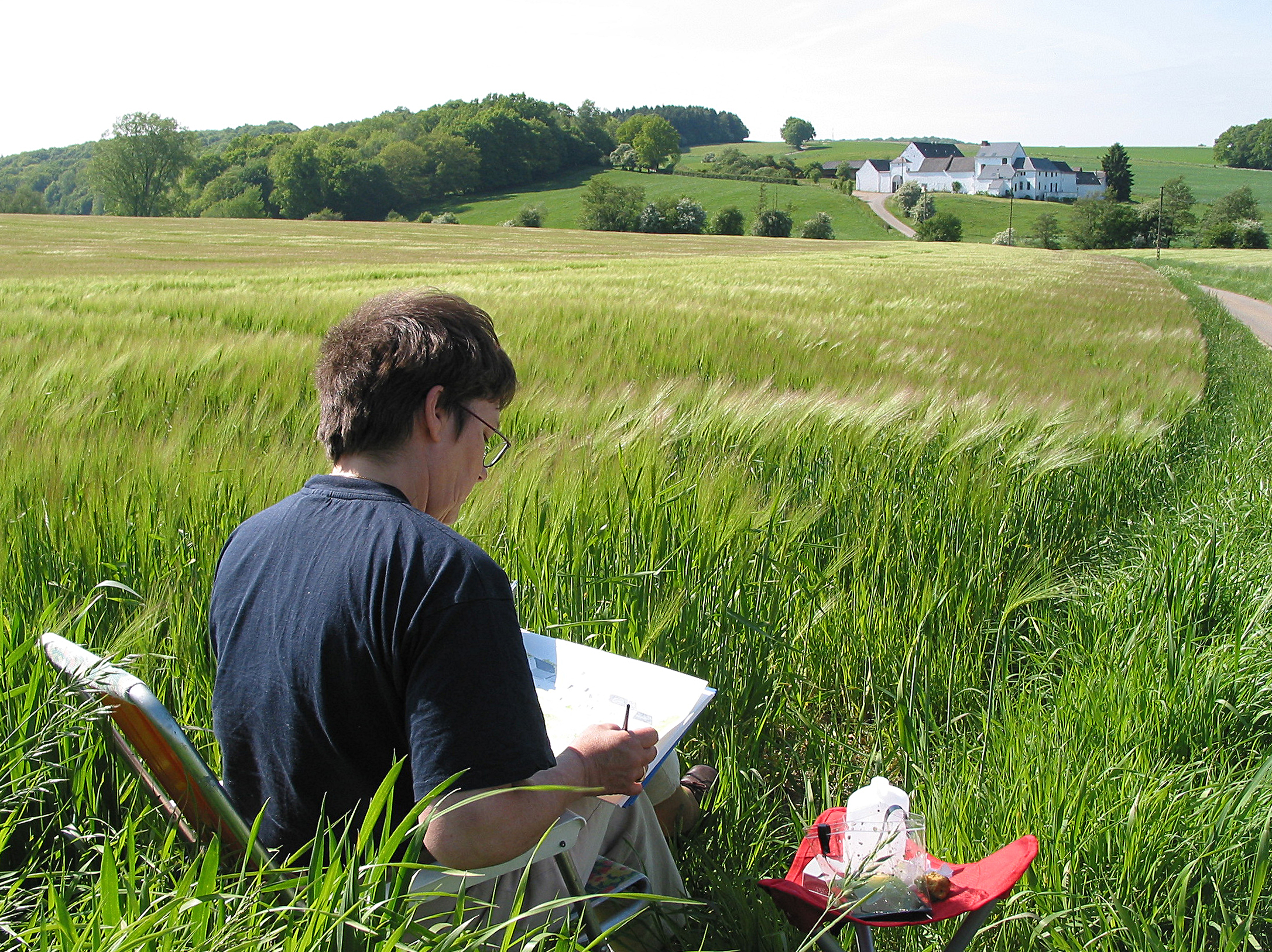
Mozet, the Baseille farm.

== See also ==
- List of protected heritage sites in Gesves
