= List of protected heritage sites in Gesves =

This table shows an overview of the protected heritage sites in the Walloon town Gesves. This list is part of Belgium's national heritage.

Object	Year/architect	Town/section	Address	Coordinates	Number^{?}	Image
The entrance portal of the old abbey Grandpre ^{(nl)} ^{(fr)}		Gesves		50.418642°N 5.017315°E	92054-CLT-0001-01	Het ingangsportaal van de oude abdij Grandpré More images
Church of Notre-Dame du Mont Carmel ^{(nl)} ^{(fr)}		Gesves		50.450445°N 5.057279°E	92054-CLT-0003-01	
Chapel "Mont-Sainte-Marie," old church of Notre-Dame ^{(nl)} ^{(fr)}		Gesves	Mozet	50.429514°N 4.979031°E	92054-CLT-0004-01	Kapel "Mont-Sainte-Marie", oude kerk Notre-Dame
Tower of farm Marchand called "Tour du Royer" ^{(nl)} ^{(fr)}		Gesves	Rue de Loyers n°4	50.440761°N 4.985400°E	92054-CLT-0007-01	Toren van boerderij Marchand genaamd "Tour du Royer"
Facades and roofs of farm of the abbey of Grandpre ^{(nl)} ^{(fr)}		Gesves		50.418324°N 5.017630°E	92054-CLT-0008-01	Gevels en daken van boerderij van de abdij van Grandpré
Facades and roofs of the old mill of the Abbey of Grandpre, and ensemble formed by the mill and its surroundings ^{(nl)} ^{(fr)}		Gesves		50.418927°N 5.017903°E	92054-CLT-0009-01	
Rochers de Roquimont ^{(nl)} ^{(fr)}		Gesves		50.428389°N 4.986197°E	92054-CLT-0010-01	
Ensemble of the rocks "Les Demoiselles" in the hamlet of Forges in the valley of the Samson ^{(nl)} ^{(fr)}		Gesves		50.452171°N 5.013349°E	92054-CLT-0011-01	
Rochers de Goyet ^{(nl)} ^{(fr)}		Gesves		50.444847°N 5.001439°E	92054-CLT-0012-01	
Ensemble of the church of Notre-Dame du Mont Carmel and the surrounding area ^{(nl)} ^{(fr)}		Gesves		50.450498°N 5.056713°E	92054-CLT-0013-01	
Castle Haltinne and the ensemble formed by the building and surrounding grounds ^{(nl)} ^{(fr)}		Gesves		50.451282°N 5.078519°E	92054-CLT-0014-01	Kasteel van Haltinne en het ensemble gevormd door het gebouw en het omliggende terrein More images
A portion of the channel of Samson in the buildings of the abbey of Grandpre ^{(nl)} ^{(fr)}		Gesves		50.418767°N 5.017469°E	92054-CLT-0015-01	
Part of the village Mozet ^{(nl)} ^{(fr)}		Gesves		50.443109°N 4.988433°E	92054-CLT-0016-01	Een deel van het dorp Mozet
Facades, roofs and canals with the grand staircase of the castle of Haltinne ^{(nl)} ^{(fr)}		Gesves		50.451282°N 5.078519°E	92054-PEX-0001-04	

== See also ==
- List of protected heritage sites in Namur (province)
- Gesves
