= Haltinne =

Haltinne Altene (Walloon)
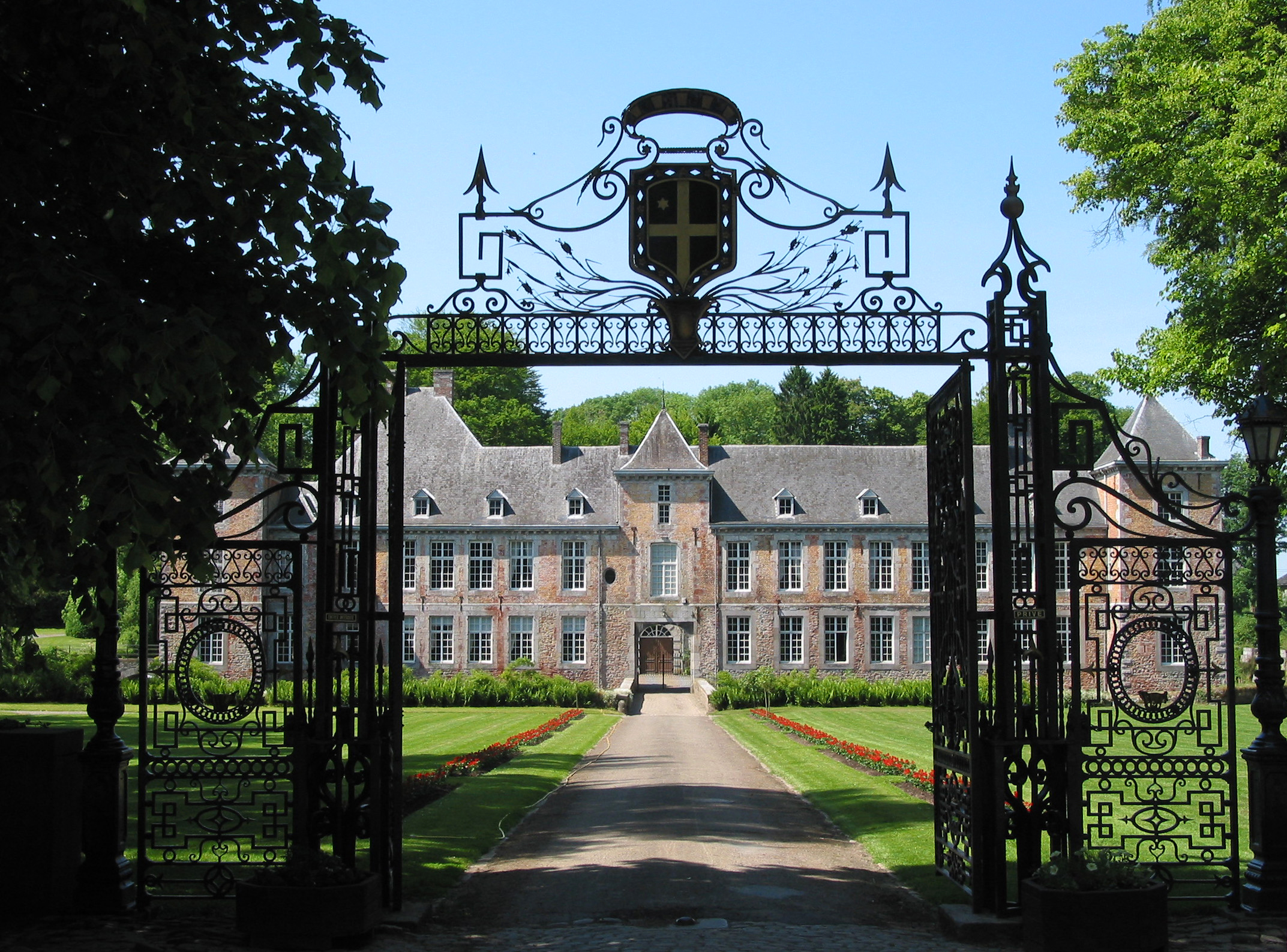
- Château de Haltinne in Haltinne

- Location within Belgium Location within Europe
- Coordinates: 50°27′N 05°05′E
- Country: Belgium
- Region: Wallonia
- Province: Namur
- Municipality: Gesves

Haltinne (French pronunciation: [altin]; Walloon: Altene) is a village of Wallonia and a district of the municipality of Gesves, located in the province of Namur, Belgium.

A small settlement existed here already during the Roman Empire. During the Middle Ages, the village formed a small fiefdom. In 1914, German artillery was positioned in the village during the siege of Namur in 1914, and during the ensuing German occupation 121 men from the village were deported to Germany in 1916 as part of the Rape of Belgium.

The château, Château de Haltinne, originated as a medieval fortified house and was rebuilt on a larger scale in 1644.

The hamlet of Strud is part of the village.
