= Strud =

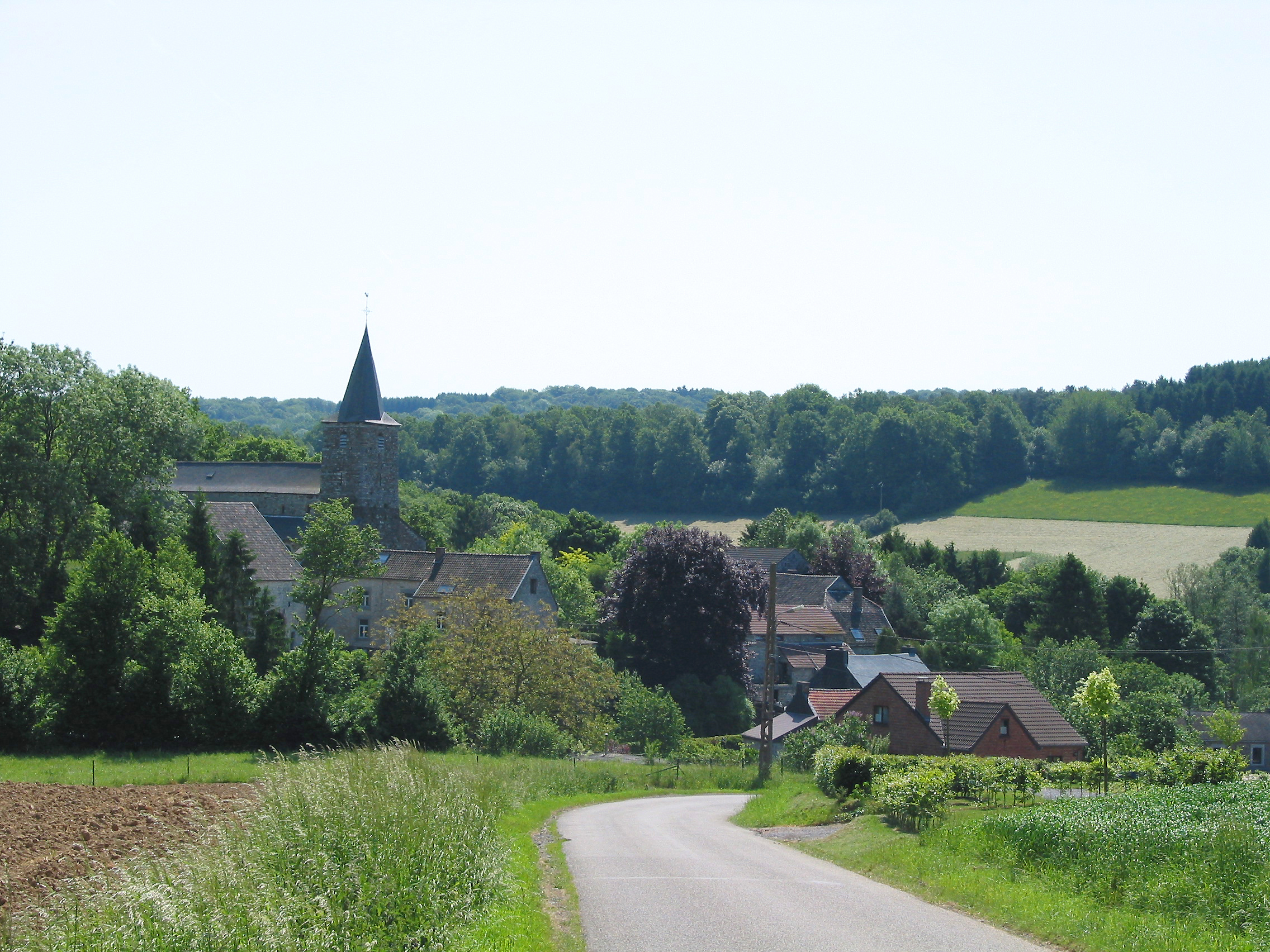
- Strud with its medieval church

- Location within Belgium Location within Europe
- Coordinates: 50°27′04″N 05°03′23″E
- Country: Belgium
- Region: Wallonia
- Province: Namur
- Municipality: Gesves

Strud is a hamlet of the village of Haltinne, Wallonia, located in the municipality of Gesves, province of Namur, Belgium.

The village church dates from the 11th century, and has a tower from the 9th century (with a 17th-century spire). It was expanded in 1891 and renovated in 1931. About 1 kilometre (0.62 miles) south of the village centre lies a manor (manoir de Labas) known since 1343, subsequently destroyed and rebuilt during the 17th century.

A Devonian lagerstätte within the Evieux Formation is known from the area, containing fossils of fairy shrimp, notostracans and possible insects.

== See also ==
- Evieux Formation
