= Mozet =

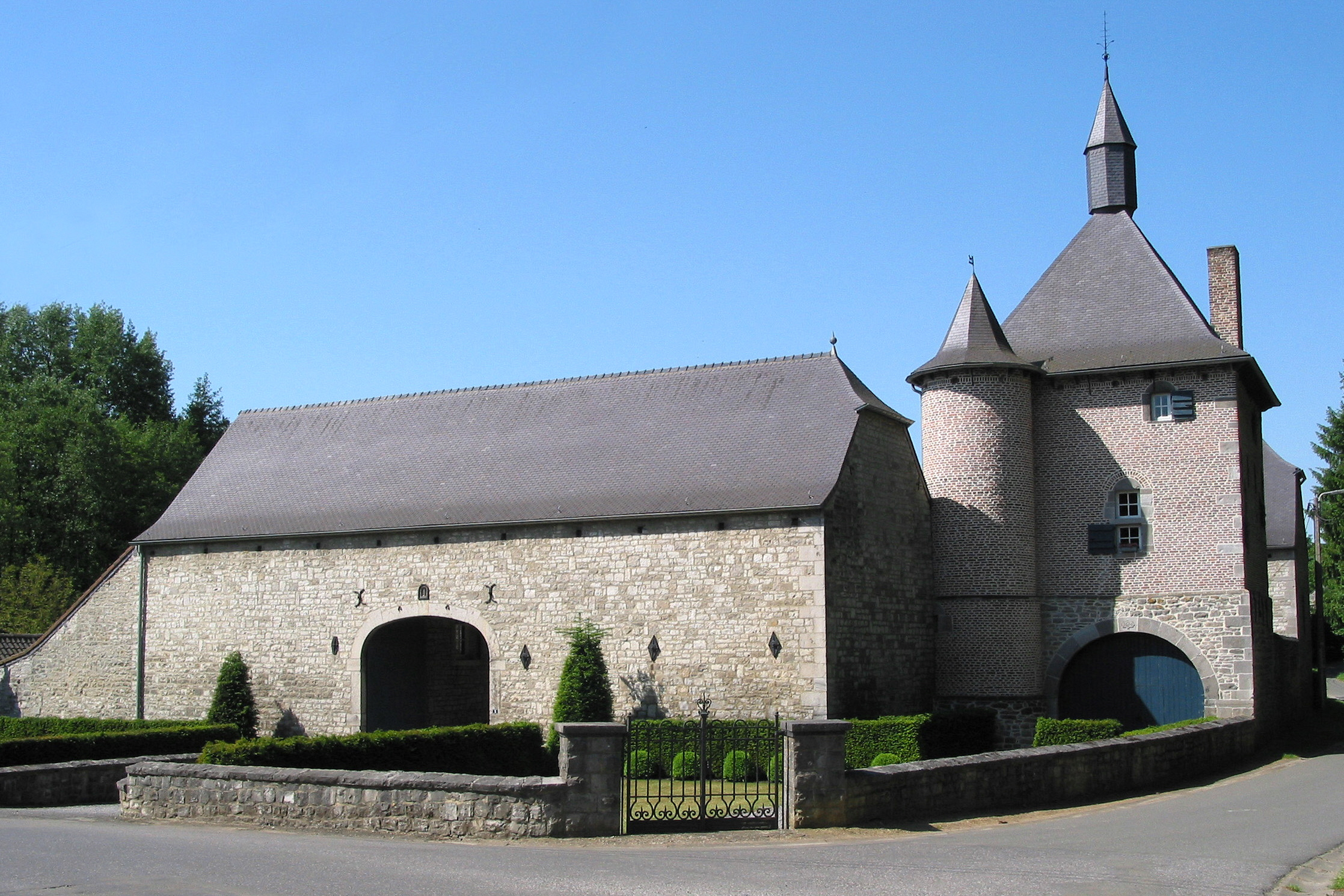
- The Royer tower, one of three fortified farms in Mozet

- Location within Belgium Location within Europe
- Coordinates: 50°26′31″N 04°59′09″E
- Country: Belgium
- Region: Wallonia
- Province: Namur
- Municipality: Gesves

Mozet (French pronunciation: [mozɛ]) is a village of Wallonia and a district of the municipality of Gesves, located in the province of Namur, Belgium.

Although the area has been settled since Roman times, the current village developed around the church and castle of an allod in the early 11th century. During World War I, fighting took place in the village in 1914, during the battle for Fort de Maizeret and Fort d'Andoy. In 1916, 65 men from the village were deported to Germany during the Rape of Belgium.

The village is clustered around the village church, which has Romanesque foundations but largely dates from 1775; it was enlarged in 1853. Three fortified farms exist in the village, as well as the ruins of a keep from the 13th century. The village is member of the association Les Plus Beaux Villages de Wallonie.
