= Goyet (place) =

Hamlet in Namur, Belgium

Coordinates: 50.44669°N 5.00888°E

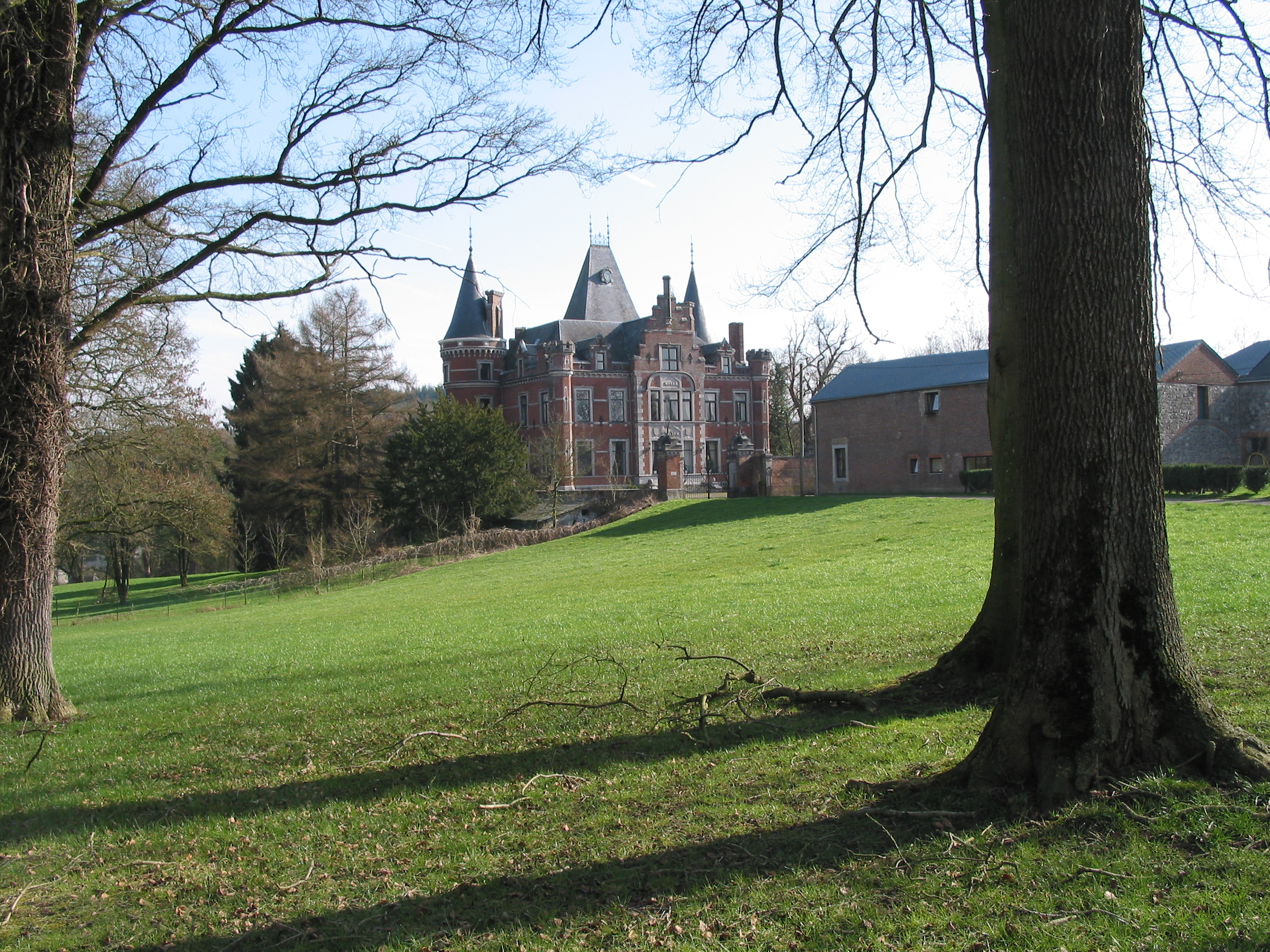
View of Goyet New Castle

Goyet is a hamlet of the municipality Gesves, Wallonia, located in the province of Namur, Belgium.

It is famous for Goyet Caves, with glacial remnants of Neandertals, Homo sapiens and canid.

In 2016, two ancient hunter-gatherers that were excavated at Goyet were found to carry the M mtDNA haplogroup. The Late Pleistocene specimens were dated to 34,000 and 35,000 years ago.
