= Zoé Goyet =

French painter

- Born: Jeanne-Zoé Grozier de Boulieu
- Died: 8 July 1869; Chateau de Greffière (Saône-et Loire)
- Spouse: Eugène Goyet

Zoé Goyet (died 8 July 1869) was a French portrait painter, pastel artist, and teacher. Her works were exhibited in the Paris Salon from 1834 to 1841. She was the wife of painter Eugène Goyet and daughter-in-law of painter Jean-Baptiste Goyet.

== Career ==
Zoé Goyet was a great-granddaughter of the influential Parisian art dealer and engraver Jean Mariette. Her marriage to Eugène Goyet brought her into the household and atelier he shared with his father, Jean-Baptiste Goyet, at 3 Rue de l'Abbaye in Paris. All three were artists, exhibiting their works at the prestigious annual Paris Salon and exhibitions in other cities in France. Zoé exhibited 14 portraits at the Salon from 1834 to 1839 and in 1841; she received a medal in 1837.

In 1837, after the Goyets moved to 25 Rue de la Chausée-D'Antin, they set up their studios next door at number 27, where Eugène and Zoé also taught drawing and painting to female students. At least one graduate of her atelier exhibited at the Paris Salon, the Salon of 1864.

In 1838 she painted a portrait of the popular novelist Michel Masson that was widely reproduced in his books.

Jules Janin praised her pastel portraits at the Salon of 1839: "In terms of energetic portraits, notice, I beg you, those of Mme. Zoé Goyet; one would say she was a pupil of M. Ingres, there is so much in her drawing. Mme. Zoé Goyet brings the greatest care and the most exacting discernment to this work."

Eugène Goyet died in 1857. In 1859, Zoé Goyet completed her husband's final commission—of a painting of Christ at Calvary, for La chapelle Notre-Dame du Calvaire, Garbriac, Averyon, France—marking the end of over three decades in which the three Goyets played a prominent role in the world of French art. Zoé died in 1869.

== Gallery ==
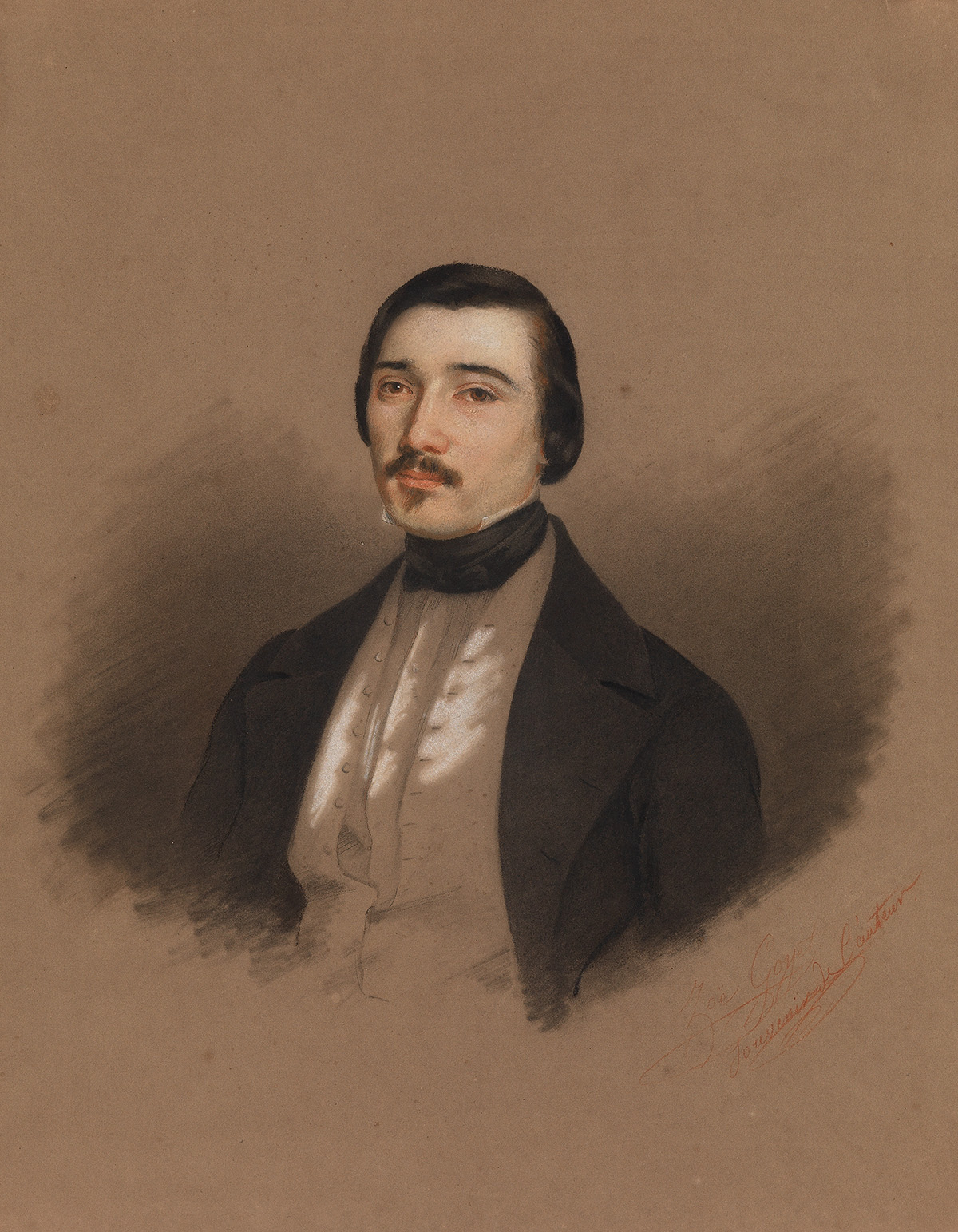
Undated and untitled portrait, pastel, private collection

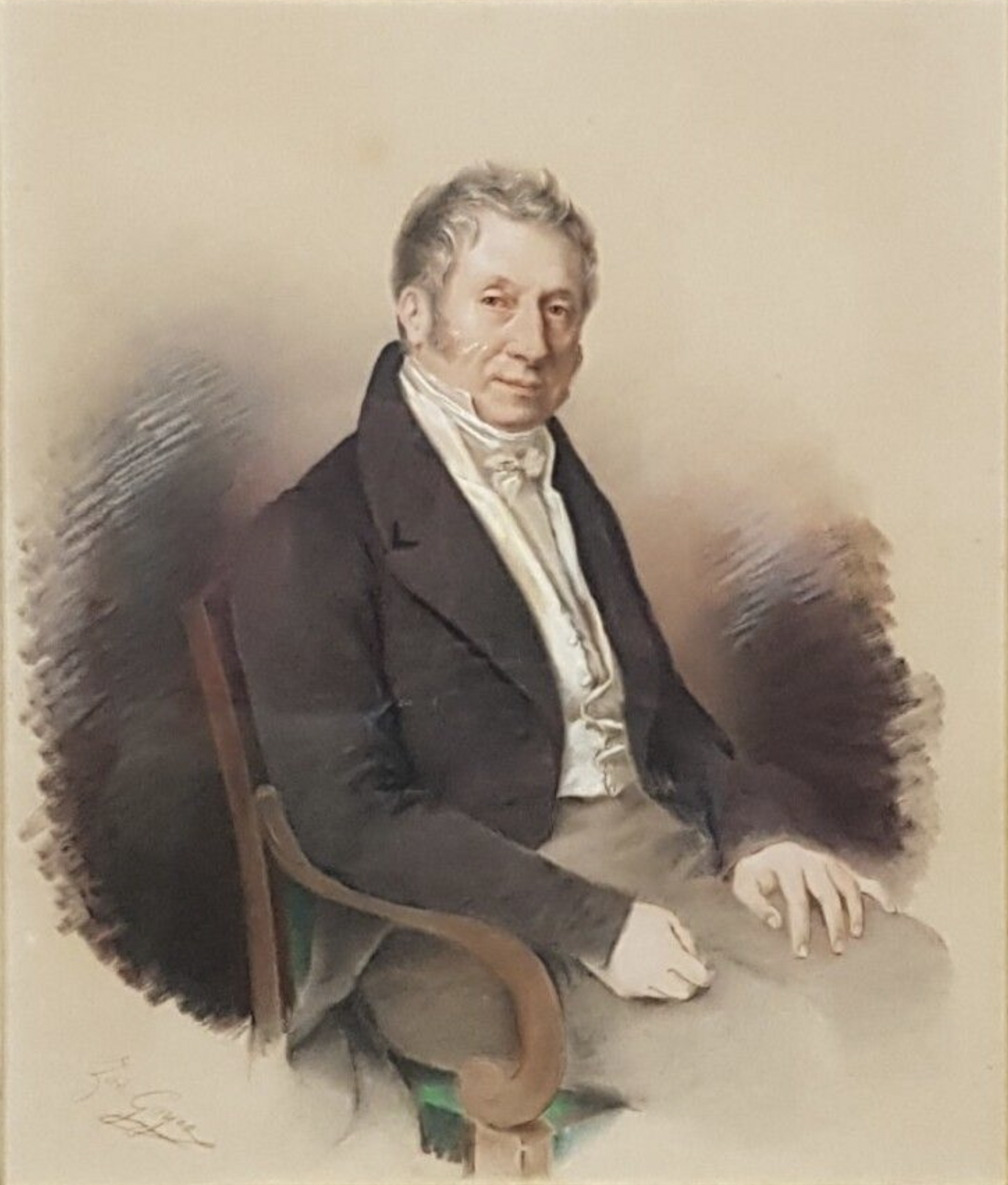
Zoé Goyet, portrait of a seated man, pastel, private collection

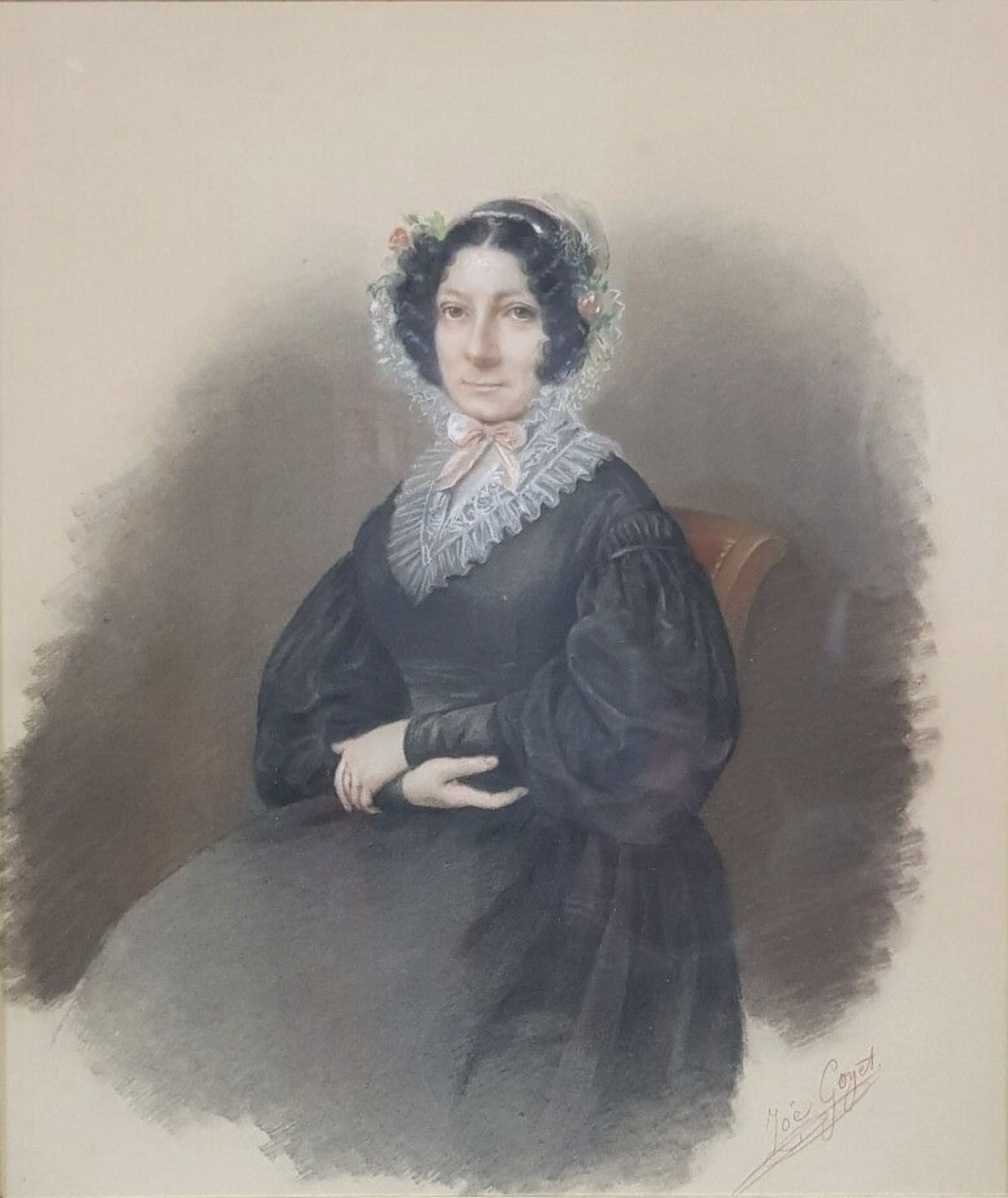
Portrait of a seated woman, pastel private collection

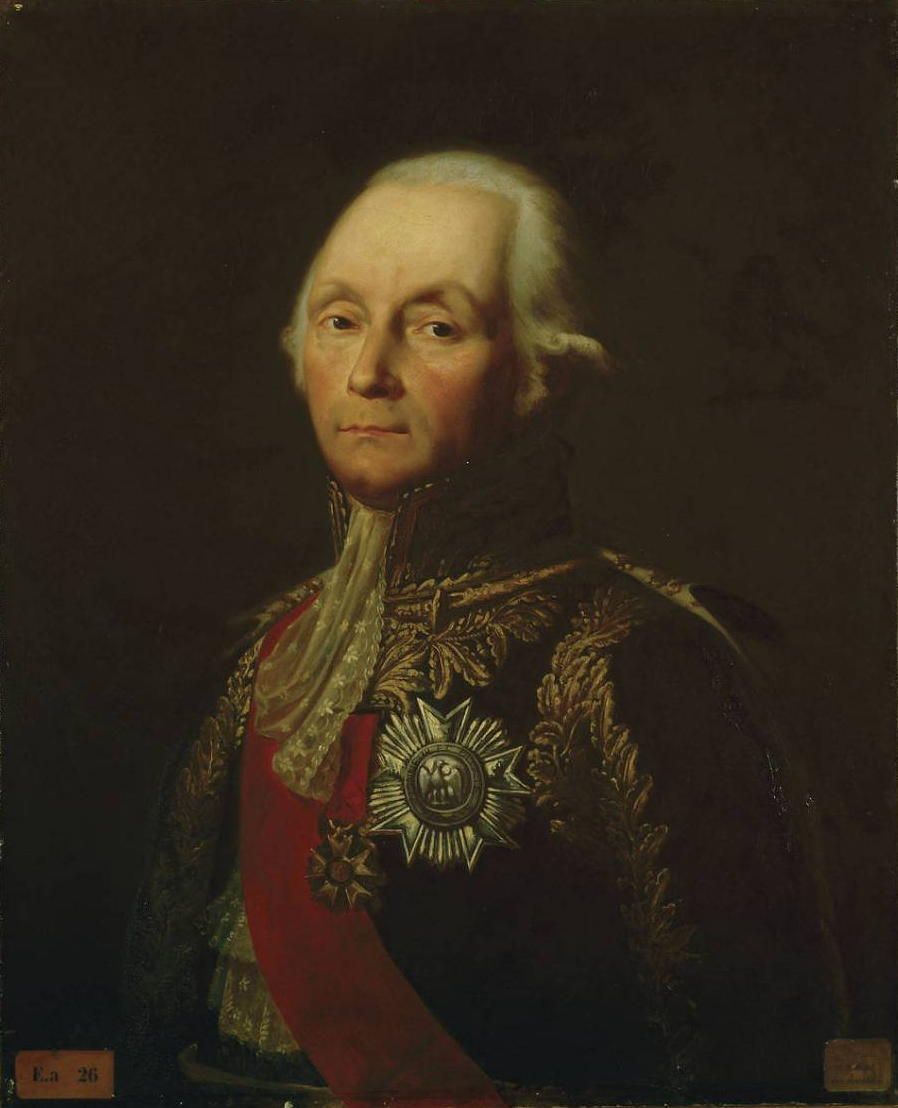
Portrait of François Christophe de Kellermann, Musée de l'Armée, Paris

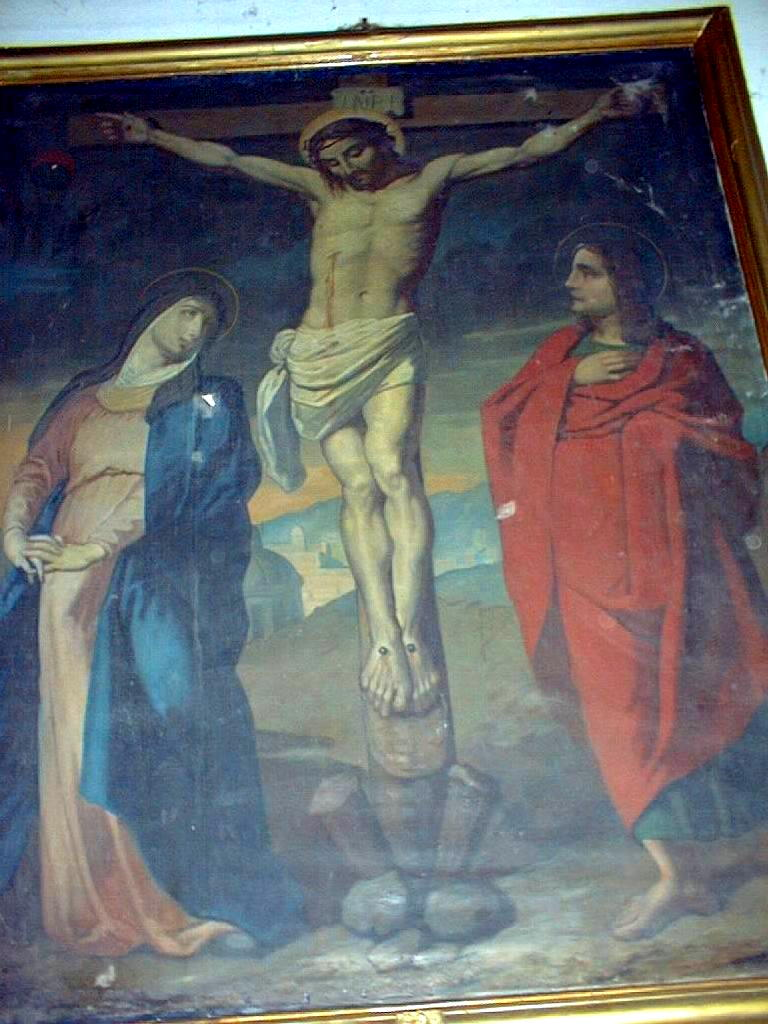
Christ at Calvary, La chapelle Notre-Dame du Calvaire, Gabriac, Aveyron, France (1859)

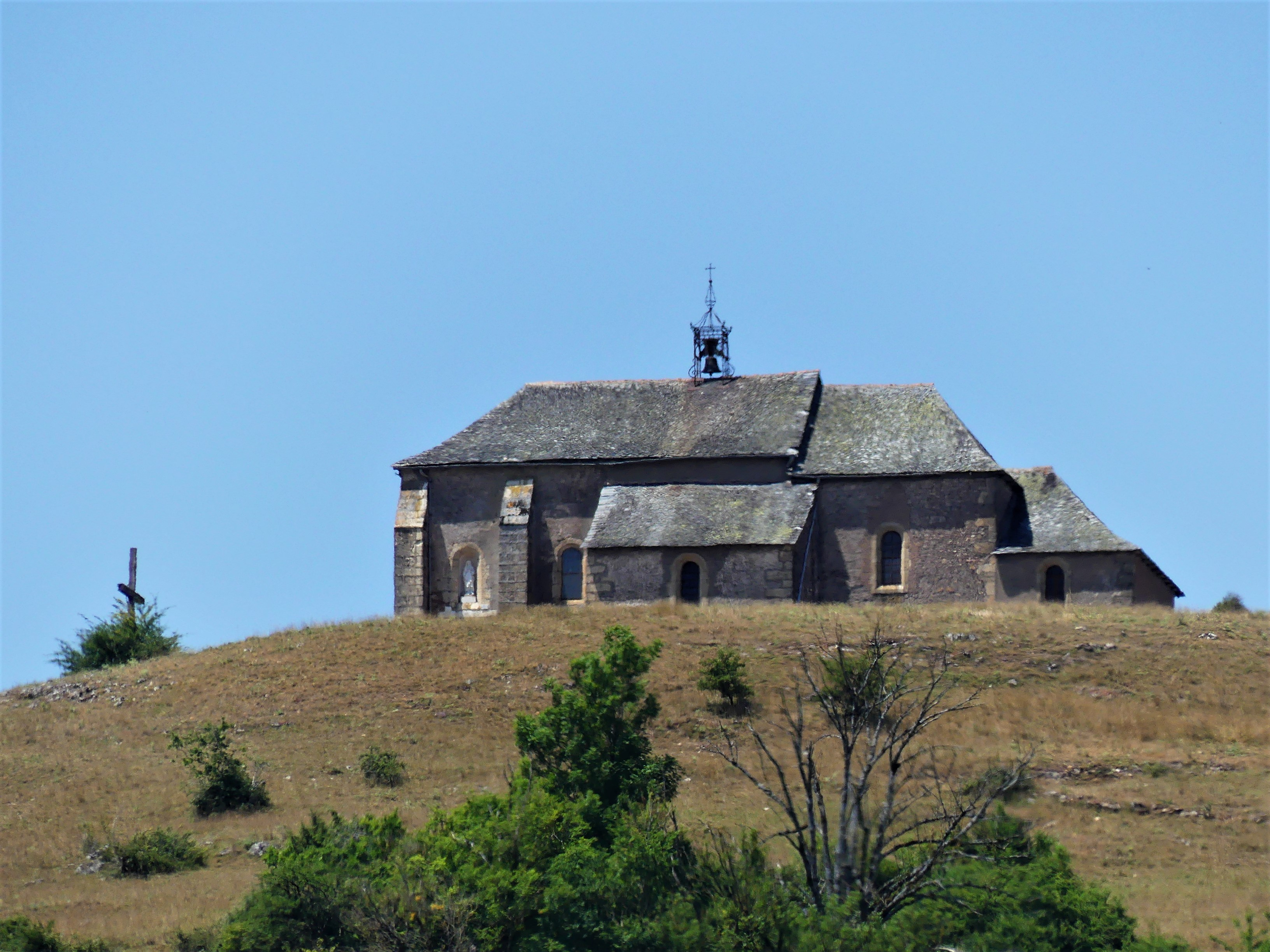
La chapelle Notre-Dame du Calvaire, Gabriac, Averyon, France
