= Eugène Goyet =

French artist (1798–1857)

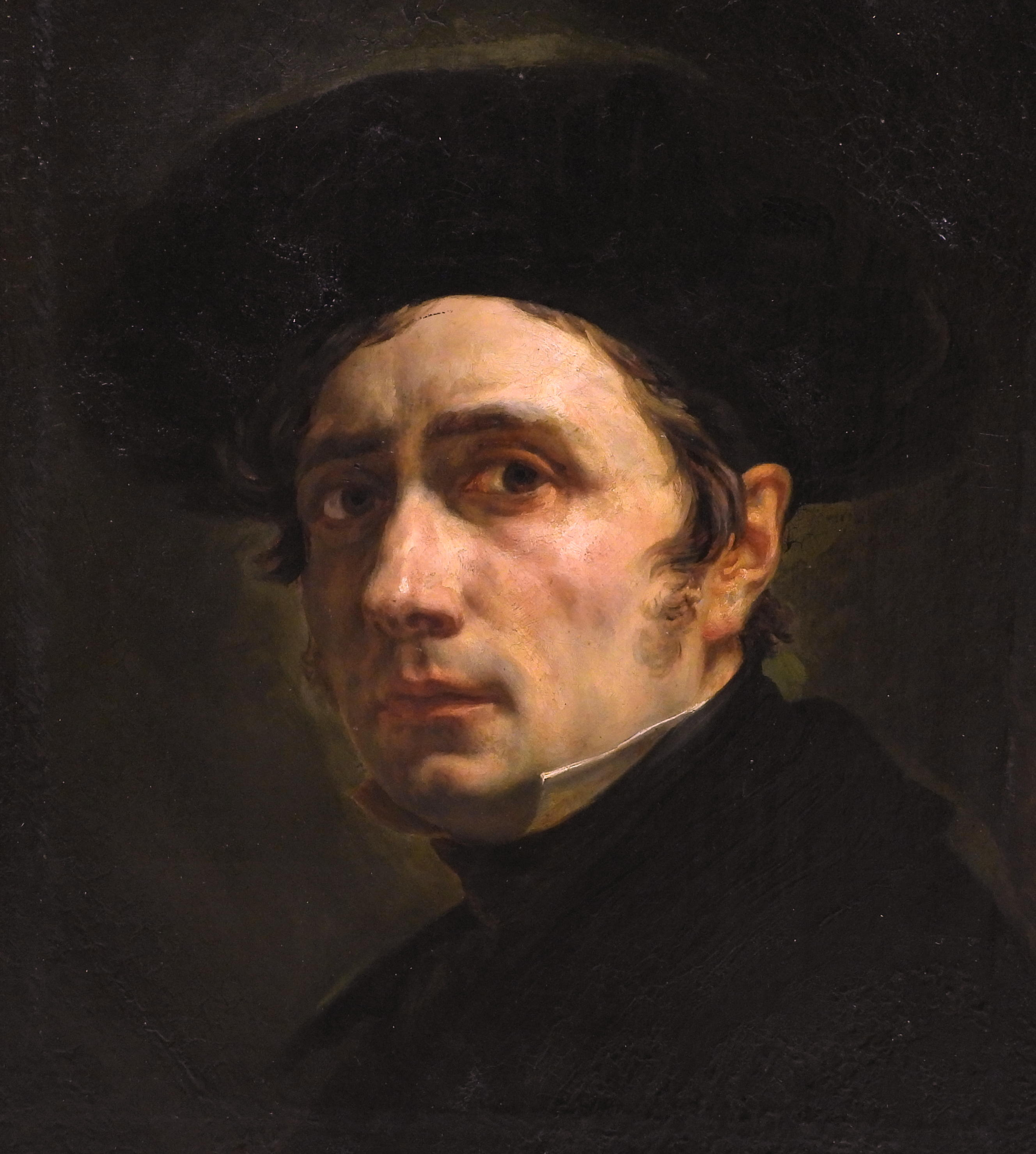
- Born: Eugène Goyet; 7 February 1798; Chalon-sur-Saône
- Died: 7 May 1857 (aged 59); Paris
- Education: atelier of Antoine-Jean Gros
- Spouse: Zoé Goyet
- Parents: Jean-Baptiste Goyet (father); Eugénie Goyet (mother)

Eugène Goyet (February 7, 1798—May 7, 1857), was a French artist. Beginning in 1827 his work was regularly selected for exhibition in the annual Paris Salon. He achieved his greatest success as a painter of religious subjects, with his paintings of Christ and various saints installed in churches and public buildings across France. A successful portrait painter, his most prestigious commission was his 1847 portrait of Pope Pius IX. He was the son of self-taught artist Jean-Baptiste Goyet, and husband of the pastel portrait artist Zoé Goyet.

== Career ==
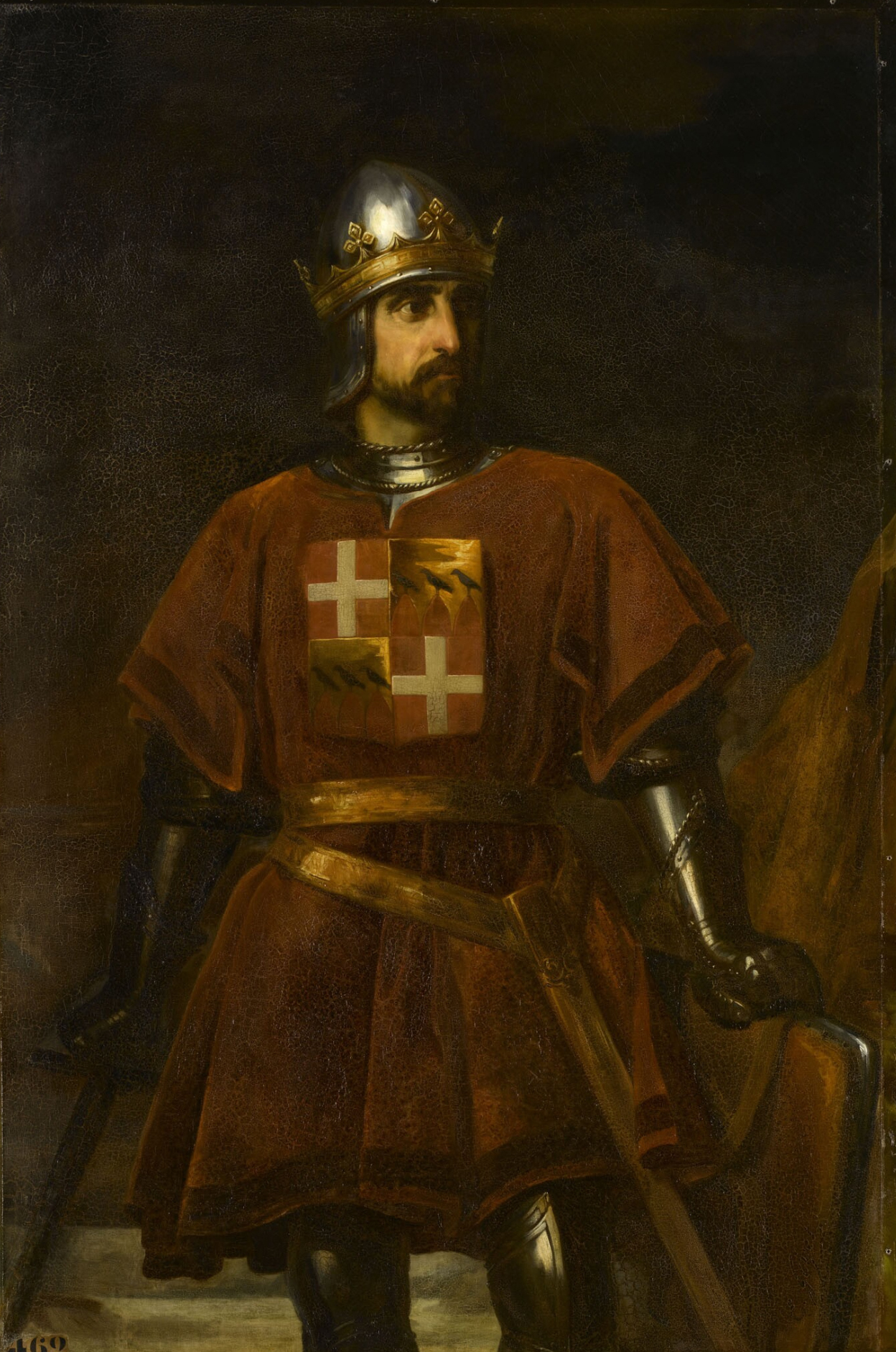
Foulques de Villaret, grand maître des hospitaliers de Saint-Jean de Jérusalem de 1307 à 1327, c. 1841, Salles des Croisades, Palace of Versailles.

Having shown an aptitude for drawing, Goyet was sent at the age of eighteen to Paris to receive formal training. Eugène ranked at the top of his class of sixty students at the atelier of Antoine-Jean Gros.

At some point Goyet's parents also moved to Paris, with the family taking up residence at 3 Rue de l'Abbaye. Father and son were to have a close lifelong relationship, residing at the same address and working in the same studio. They made their debuts at the Paris Salon in the same year, the Salon of 1827, when Jean-Baptiste was 48 and Eugène was 29. From that point, both Goyets regularly had works selected for exhibition in the Salons, as did Eugène's wife, Zoé, a portrait artist who specialized in pastels. Eugène exhibited 52 paintings at the Salon from 1827 to 1857.

Eugène Goyet exhibited a portrait of his father at the Salon of 1833 (the year Jean-Baptiste turned 54), where it received a silver medal for portraiture. "A striking resemblance, great vigor of effect and execution, conscientious drawing," wrote one critic, "such are the principal qualities that can be seen in the portrait of M. J.-B. Goyet painted by M. E. Goyet, which recalls the fine portraits of the Flemish school." When the portrait was shown in Lille the next year, it was called "one of the most remarkable works of our salon." This portrait was in the atelier on Rue de la Chausée-D'Antin at the time of Eugène's death and may have been included in the estate sale of 1857, but its current location is unknown.

In 1837, after the Goyets moved to 25 Rue de la Chausée-D'Antin, they set up their studios next door at number 27, where Eugène and Zoé also taught drawing and painting to female students. At least one graduate of Zoé's atelier exhibited at the Paris Salon, at the Salon of 1864.

His painting at the Salon of 1839, Le Christ mourant sur la croix, received a gold medal. Another high point of Goyet's career was his trip to Rome in 1847, where he was commissioned to paint Pope Pius IX. The painting was purchased by the state under Napoleon III and installed at the Palais des Tuileries. Its present location is unknown.

Goyet's final, unfinished work was Le massacre des Innocents, which was posthumously exhibited at the Paris Salon of 1857 and reviewed by Jules Verne:

M. Goyet, whom death has so fatally surprised in the midst of his work, would be remembered, if he were one of those we could forget, by a large, regrettably unfinished painting; it represents The Massacre of the Innocents. Never has this somewhat vulgar subject been treated more dramatically; the scene is vast, the episodes are numerous and varied, and render all the possible situations of this appalling butchery. Mr. Goyet had very little to do to finish this beautiful work, but unfortunately could not enjoy its success; it is the eternal law of Sic vos non vobis!

(Verne also promoted the works of Eugène's father. Jean-Baptiste Goyet's Un conseil de guerre jugeant un duelliste, sous le règne de Louis XIII (1835) was on the list of paintings that Verne in 1891 argued should be moved from official rooms in the Hôtel-de-Ville of Amiens to the Musée de Picardie, where "all the public could thus benefit.")

Goyet died May 7, 1857, at the age of 59, "in the prime of life and the full vigor of his talent." An estate sale was held June 24–26 at the Goyet atelier on Rue de la Chausée-D'Antin, featuring numerous paintings, drawings, and studies by both Eugène Goyet and his father.

== Legacy ==
In an obituary, the critic Hyacinthe Audiffred wrote: "It was in the insatiable contemplation of immortal interpreters of art, in the poetry of solitude, that he loved to meditate and create his beautiful images of the Virgin, Christ and martyrs, drawing inspiration from the graceful or dramatic memories of Guide, Poussin and Murillo."

The Revue Universelle des Arts remembered him as "a distinguished painter…who married the great-granddaughter of Mariette and thereby became the ally of this famous family in the fine arts. M. Goyet devoted himself especially to the religious genre; in Paris, the churches of Notre-Dame de Lorette, Saint-Leu, Saint-Médard, and Saint-Louis d'Antin are decorated with his paintings; there are also several in various provincial churches."

Eugène Goyet died less than three years after his father; their Salon careers were essentially parallel, beginning and ending together. Both were buried in the 24th division of Montmartre Cemetery.

In 1859, Zoé Goyet completed her husband's final commission—of a painting of Christ at Calvary, for La chapelle Notre-Dame du Calvaire, Garbriac, Averyon, France—marking the end of over three decades in which the three Goyets played a prominent role in the world of French art. Zoé died in 1869.

Goyet's imaginary portrait of Foulques de Villaret, displayed since the 1840s in the Salles des Croisades at the Palace of Versailles, is perhaps his best-known work today.

== Presumed self-portraits ==
Portrait d’artiste, possibly a self-portrait, was exhibited by Eugène Goyet at the Paris Salon of 1855 (the year he turned 57) and two years later was mentioned (alongside the portrait of his father) as part of Goyet's estate. Two different paintings said to be self-portraits by Eugène Goyet have come to auction in France, one at Vassy & Jalenques in Clermont-Ferrand on December 16, 2021, and another at Valoir Pousse-Cornet in Blois, on March 26, 2022.

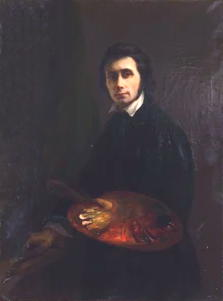
Presumed self-portrait auctioned in 2021.

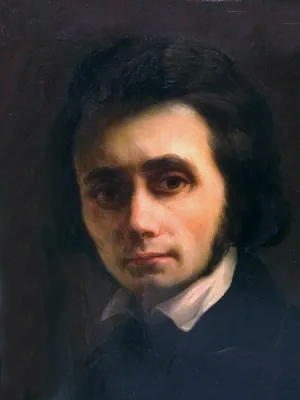
Presumed self-portrait (detail) auctioned in 2021.

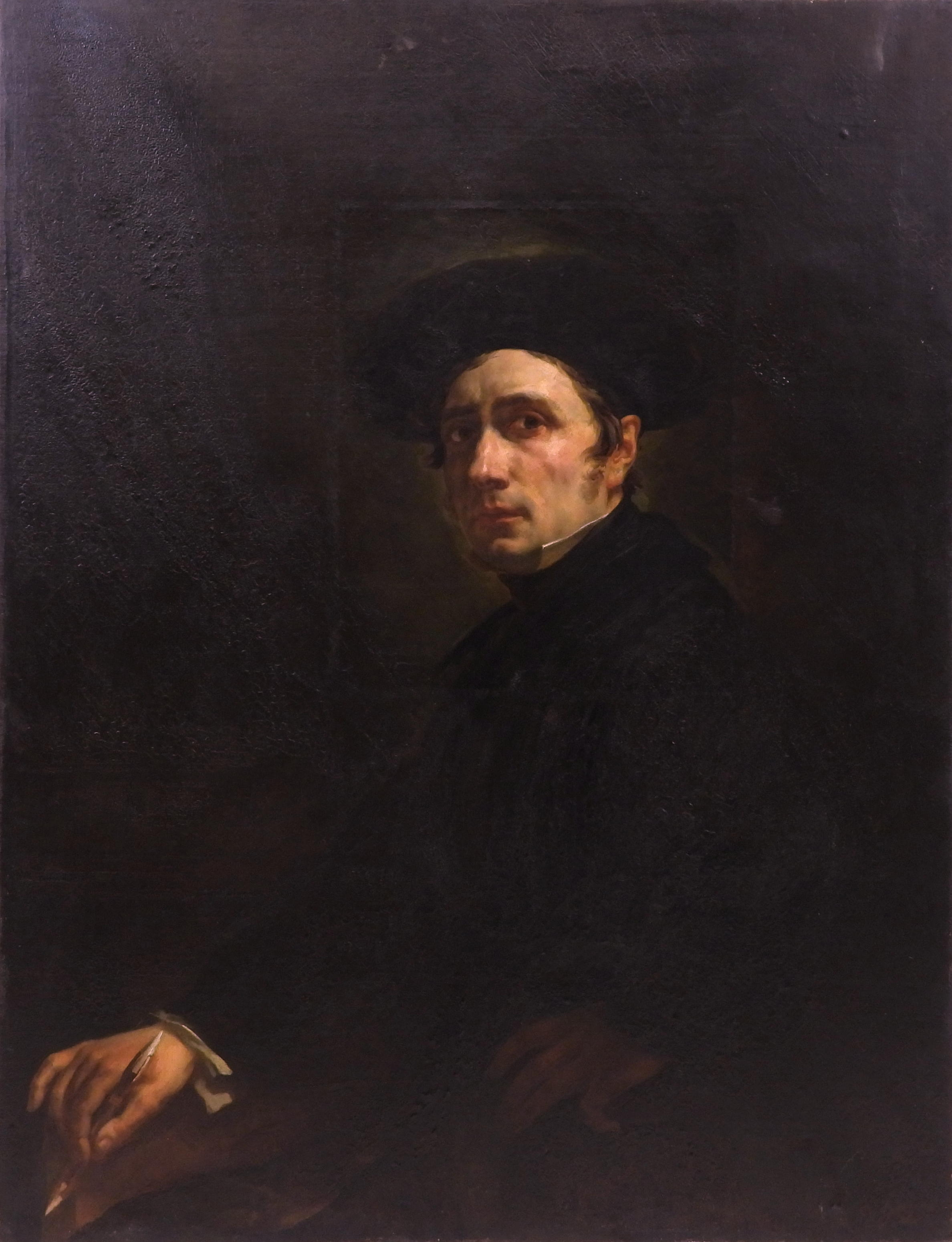
Presumed self-portrait auctioned in 2022.

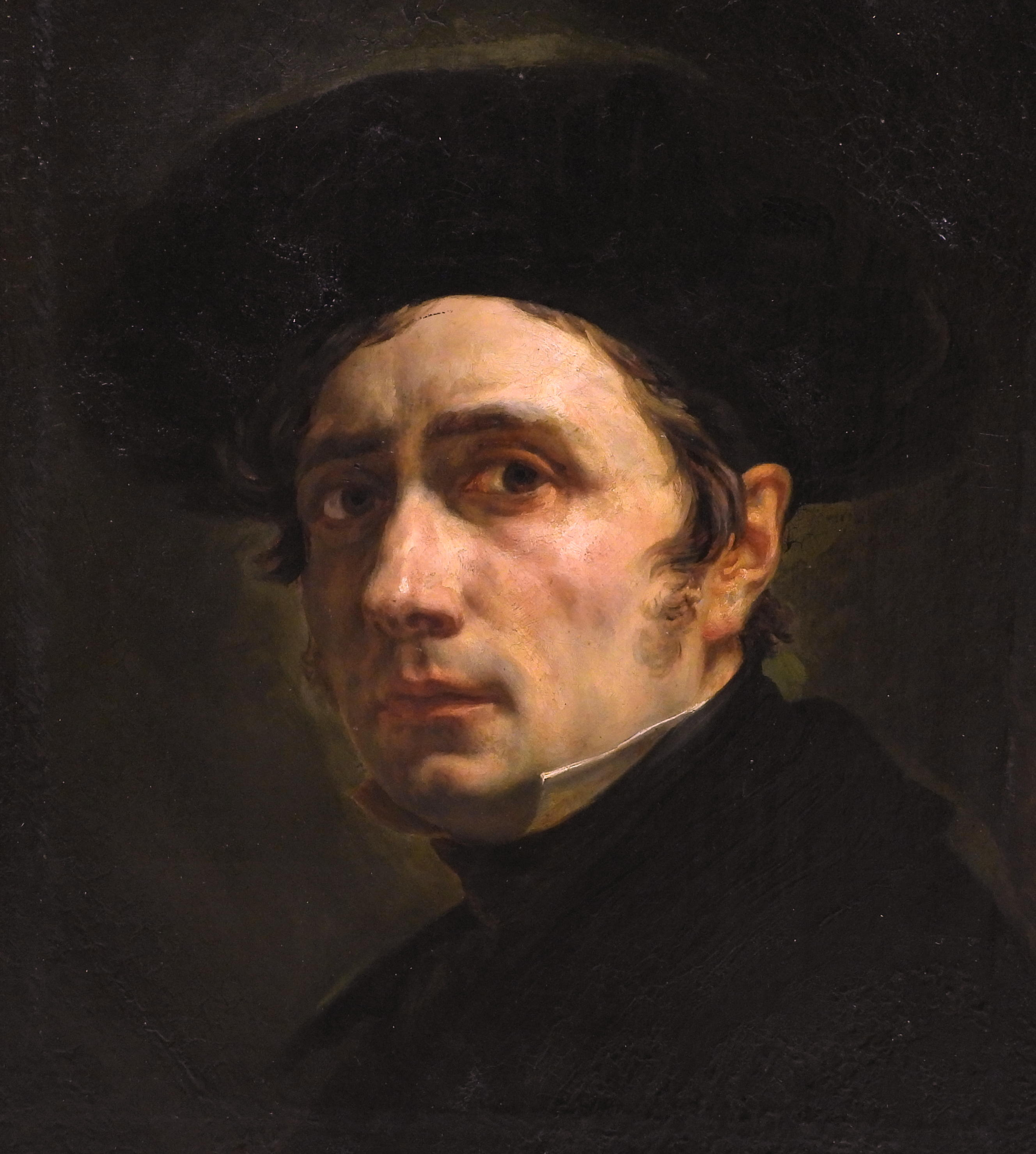
Presumed self-portrait (detail) auctioned in 2022.

== Im museums and public collections in France ==
- Agen, Mairie (town hall): Roi Charles X, 1828.
- Agen, Préfecture du Lot-et-Garonne: Roi Louis-Philippe, 1831.
- Béziers, Musée des Beaux-Arts, Le Massacre des Innocents, Paris Salon of 1857.
- Chantilly, Musée Condé, Portrait of Mme. de Montesson, n.d.
- Charolles, Mairie (town hall): La Mort de Saint Paul, 1834.
- Excideuil, Mairie (town hall): Le Christ en croix, 1838.
- Gabriac, Mairie (town hall): Le Christ au jardin des Oliviers, Paris Salon of 1845; Le Christ en croix, n.d.
- Millau, Marie (town hall): Sainte Cécile, Paris Salon of 1842.
- Mirande, Mairie (town hall): L'Assomption, 1830.
- Montpellier, Cathédrale Saint-Pierre: Un trait de la vie de saint Germain (Saint Germain, évêque d'Auxerre), 1842.
- Paris, Église Saint-Jacques-du-Haut-Pas: Saint Magloire, n.d.
- Paris, Maison de Balzac: Louise Béchet, c. 1840.
- Pézenas, Mairie (town hall): La Vision de Saint Luc (Apparition de la Vierge à Saint Luc), Paris Salon of 1834.
- Plaisance, Mairie (town hall): Le Christ en Croix et deux anges en adoration, 1834.
- Ussel, Mairie (town hall): Le Christ entre deux anges (Le Christ sur la croix avec deux anges en adoration), 1834.
- Versailles, Châteaux de Versailles et de Trianon: Georges-Félia, Baron de Wimpfen, 1834; André Doria, Prince de Melfi, Amiral des Mers du Levant (1466-1560), n.d.
- Versailles, Salles des Croisades, Palace of Versailles: Foulques de Villaret, grand maître des hospitaliers de Saint-Jean de Jérusalem de 1307 à 1327, c. 1841.

== Gallery (chronological) ==
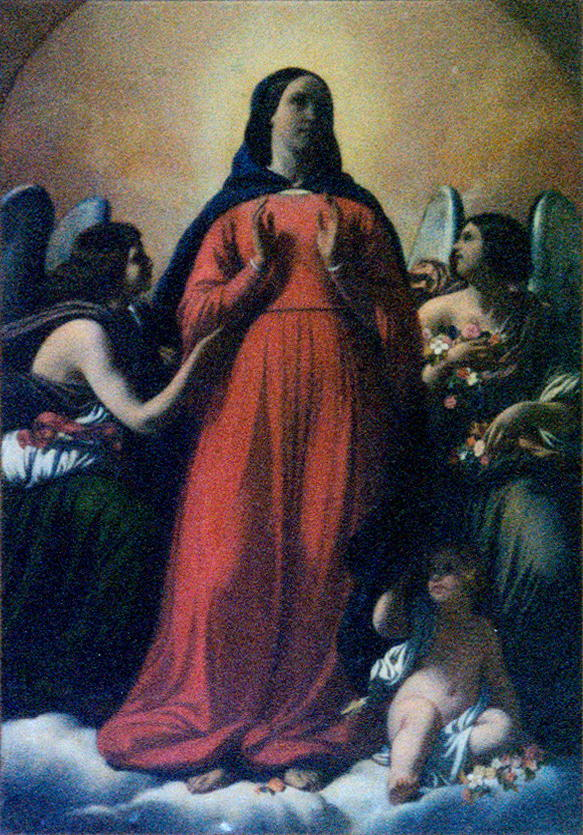
L'Assomption, 1830, Mairie de Mirande.

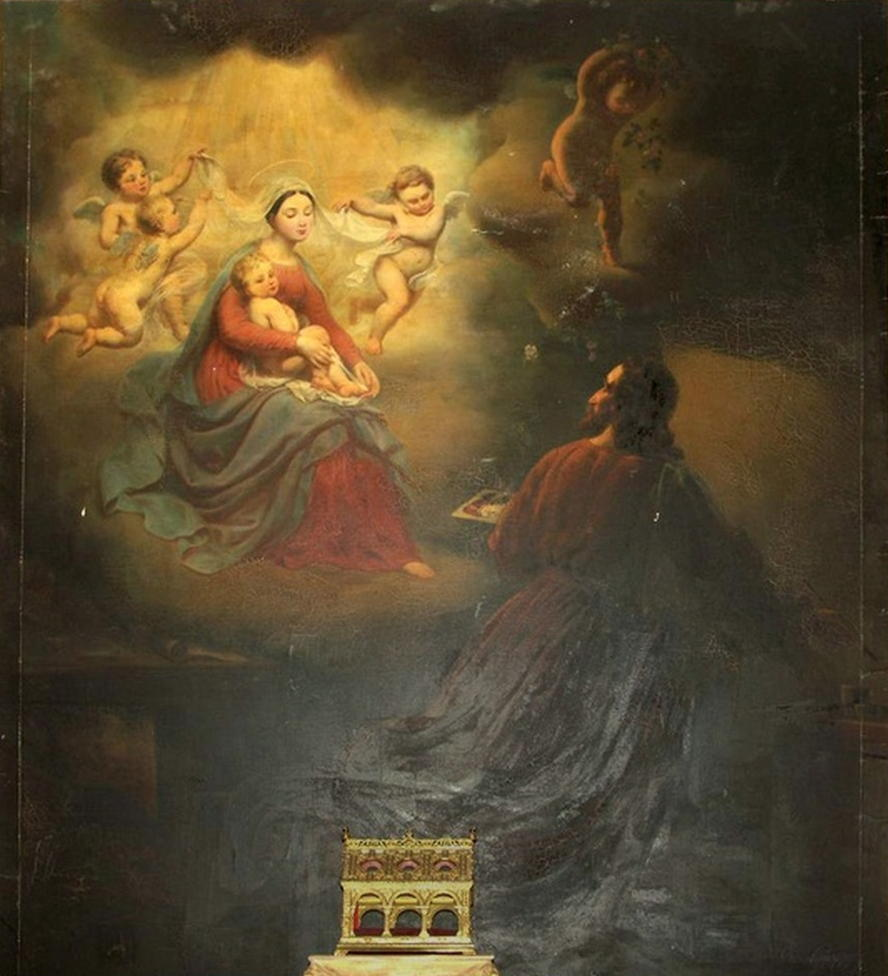
La Vision de Saint Luc, 1834, Mairie de Pézenas.

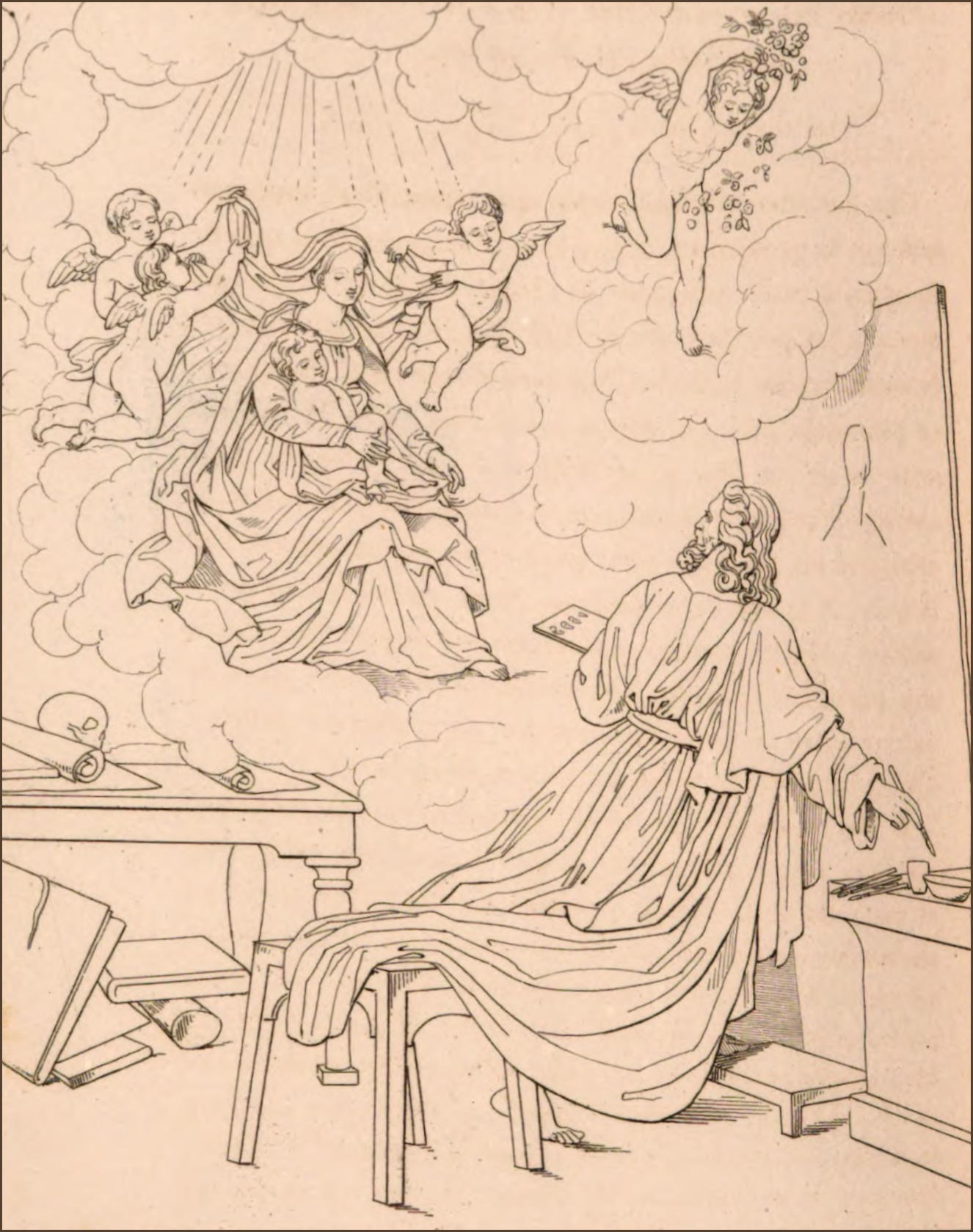
La Vision de Saint Luc (etching) 1834.

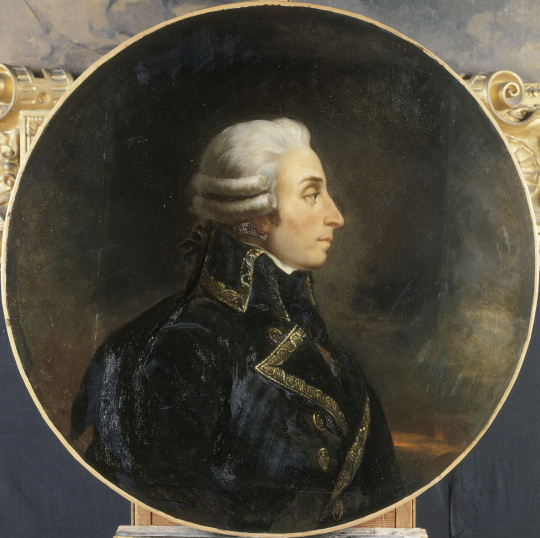
Georges-Félia, Baron de Wimpfen, 1834, Châteaux de Versailles et de Trianon.

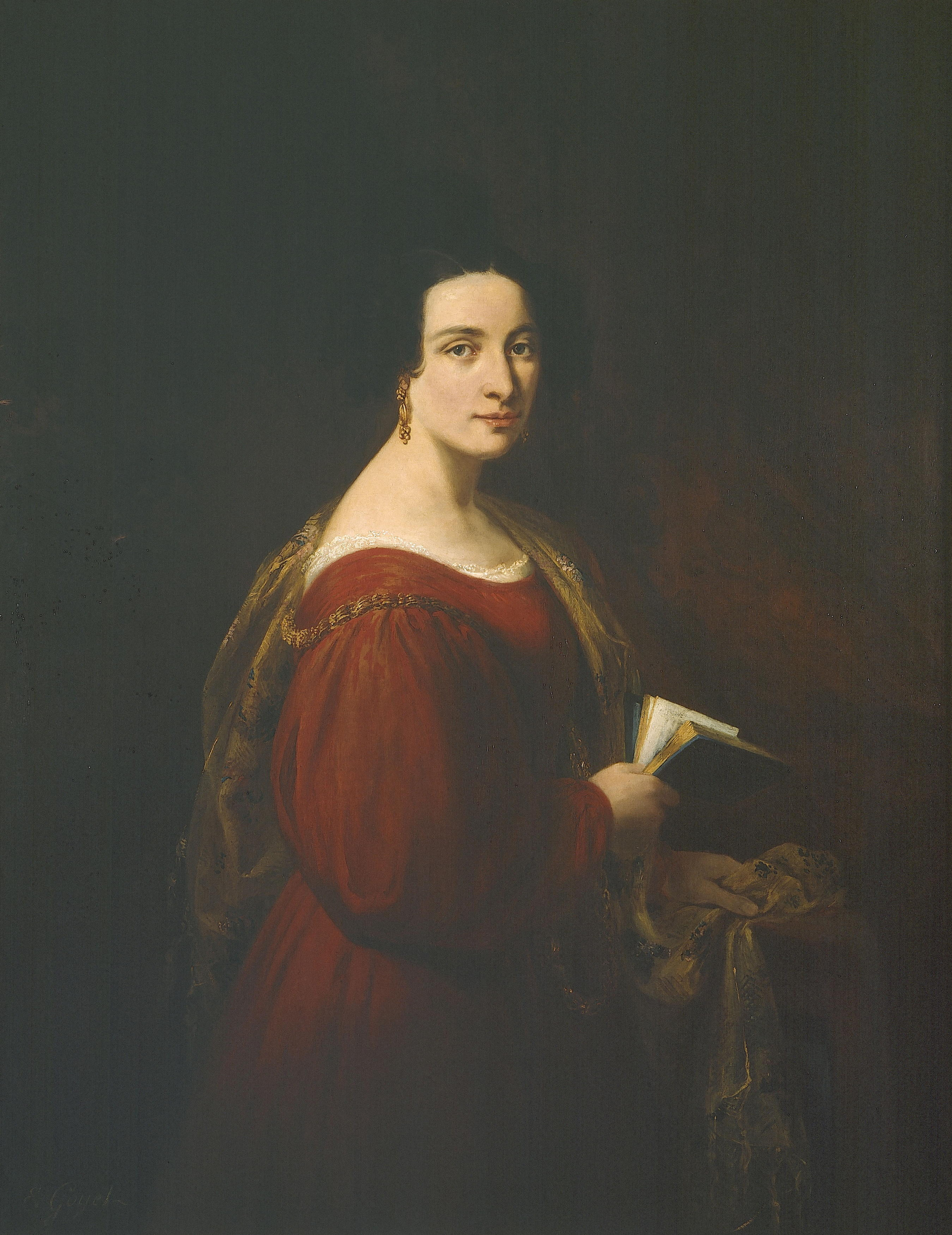
Louise Béchet, c.1840, Maison de Balzac, Paris.

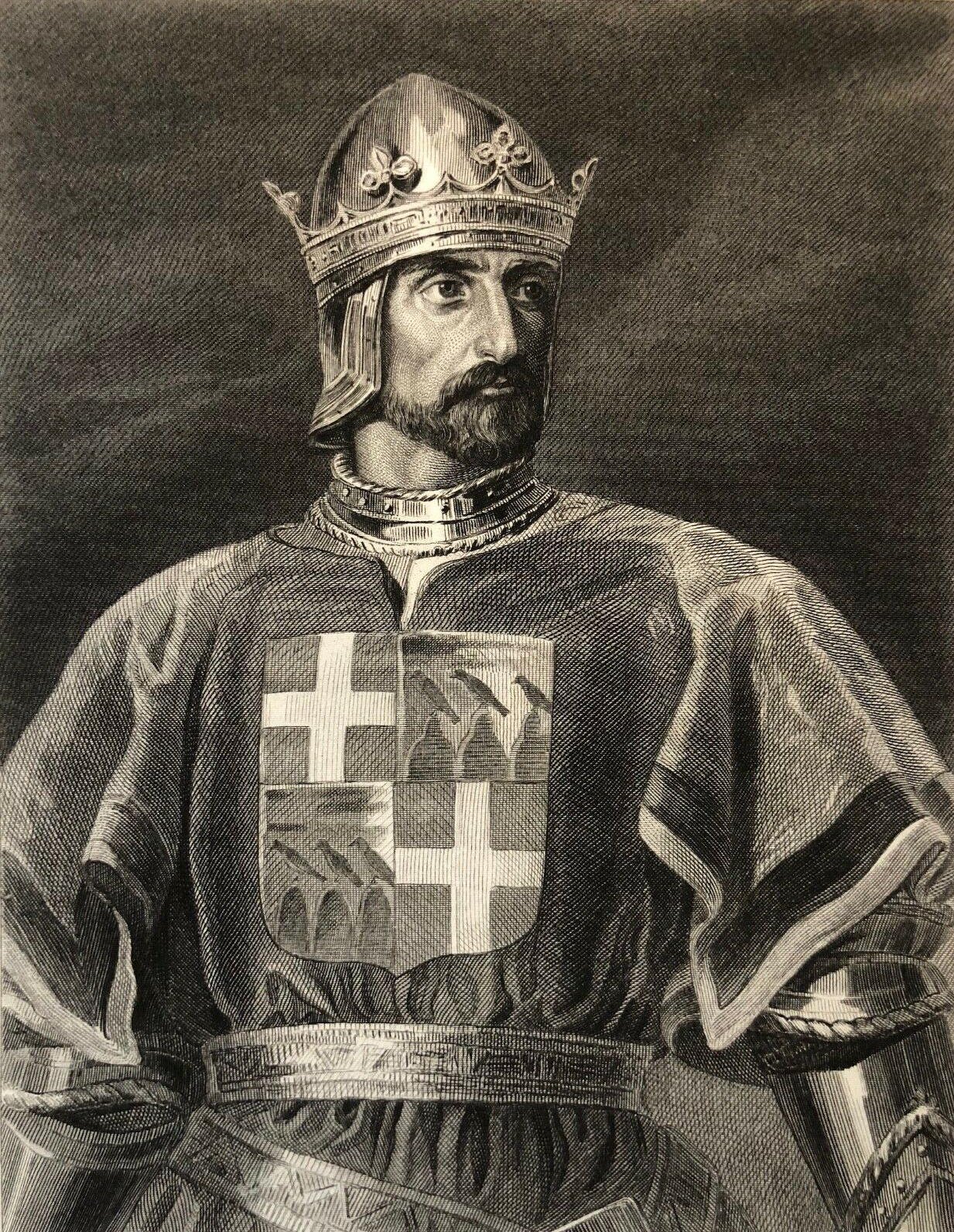
Foulques de Villaret, engraved by François Pigeot after 1841.

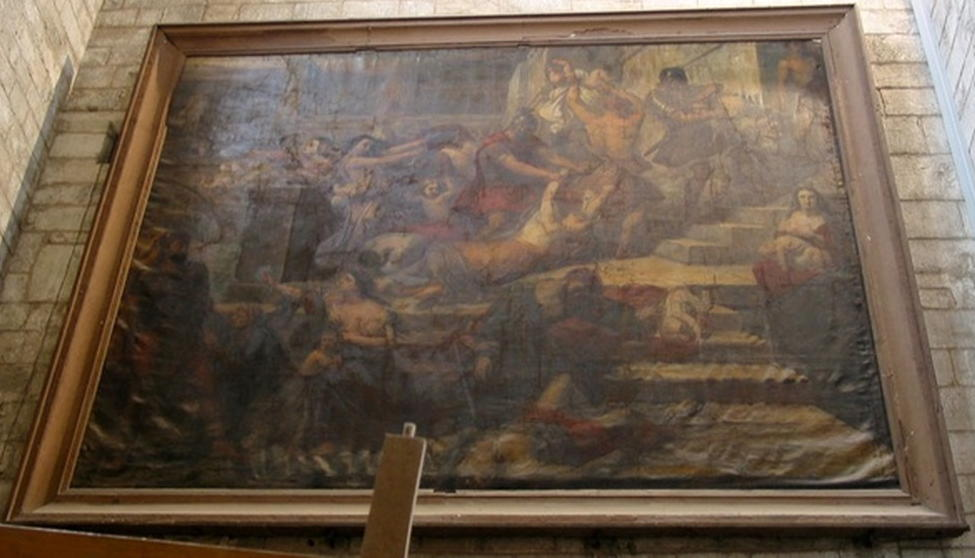
Le Massacre des Innocentes, Paris Salon 1857, Musée des Beaux-Arts de Béziers.

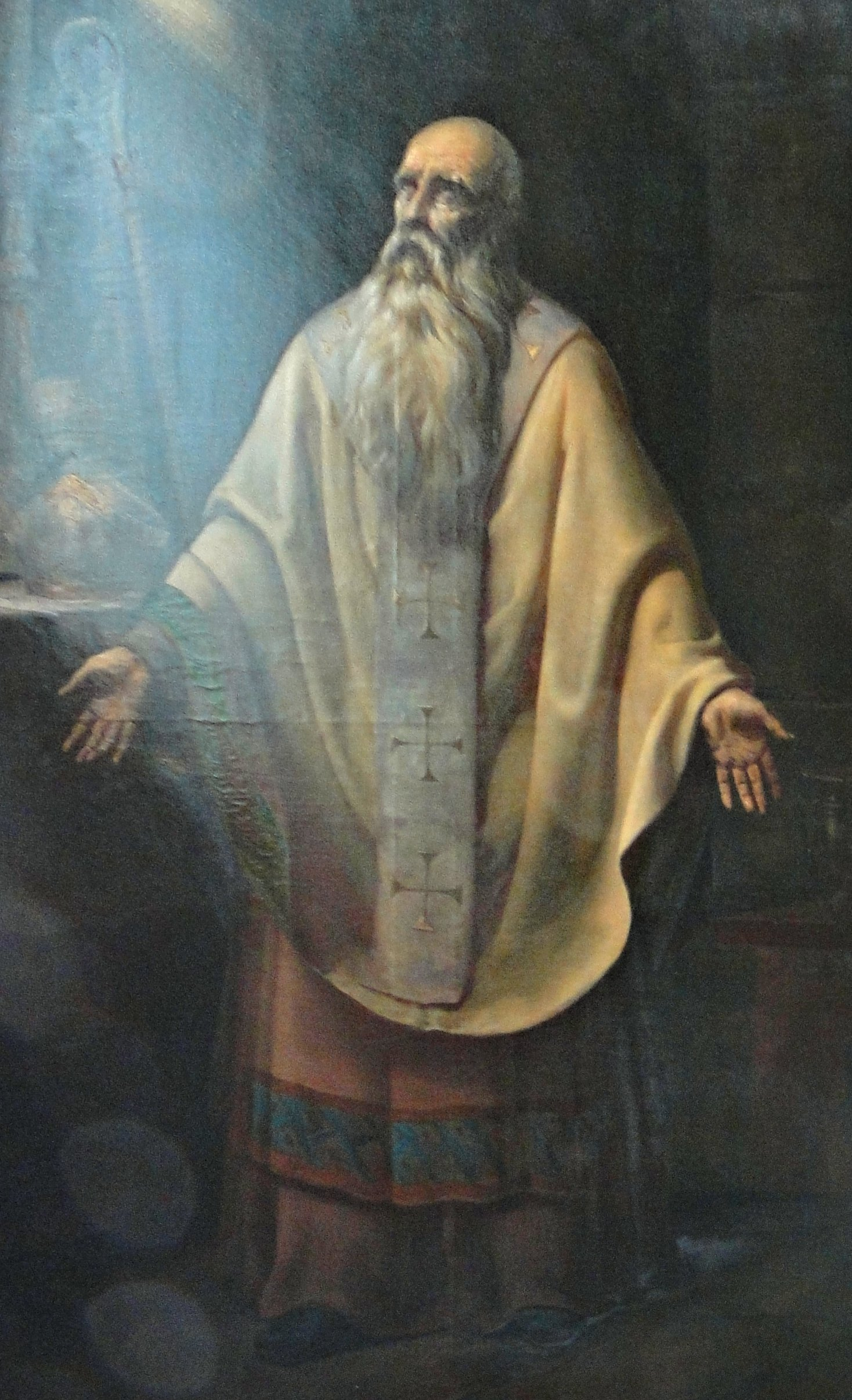
Saint Magloire, n.d., Église Saint-Jacques-du-Haut-Pas, Paris.

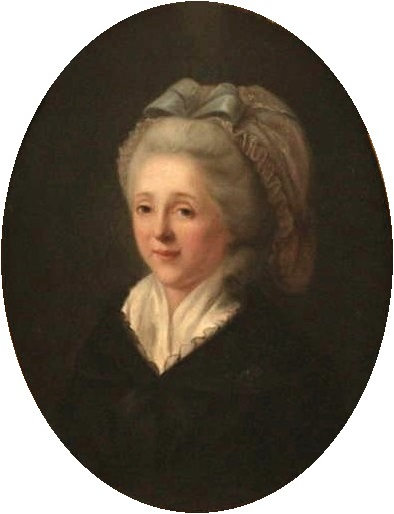
Portrait of Mme. de Montesson, n.d., Musée Condé

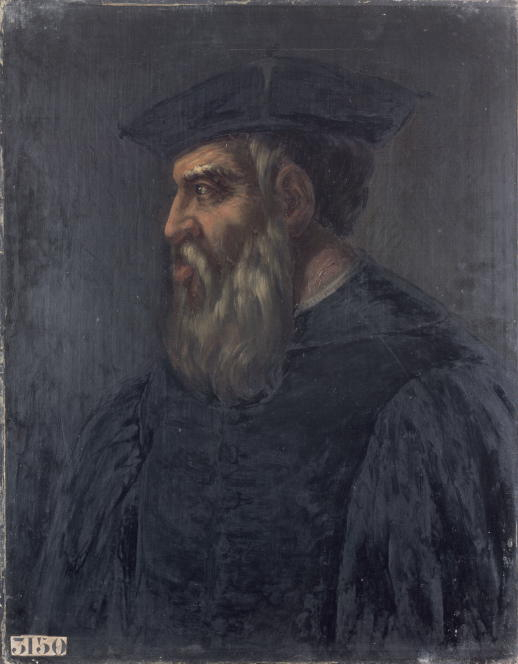
André Doria, Prince de Melfi, Amiral des Mers du Levant, n.d., Châteaux de Versailles et de Trianon.

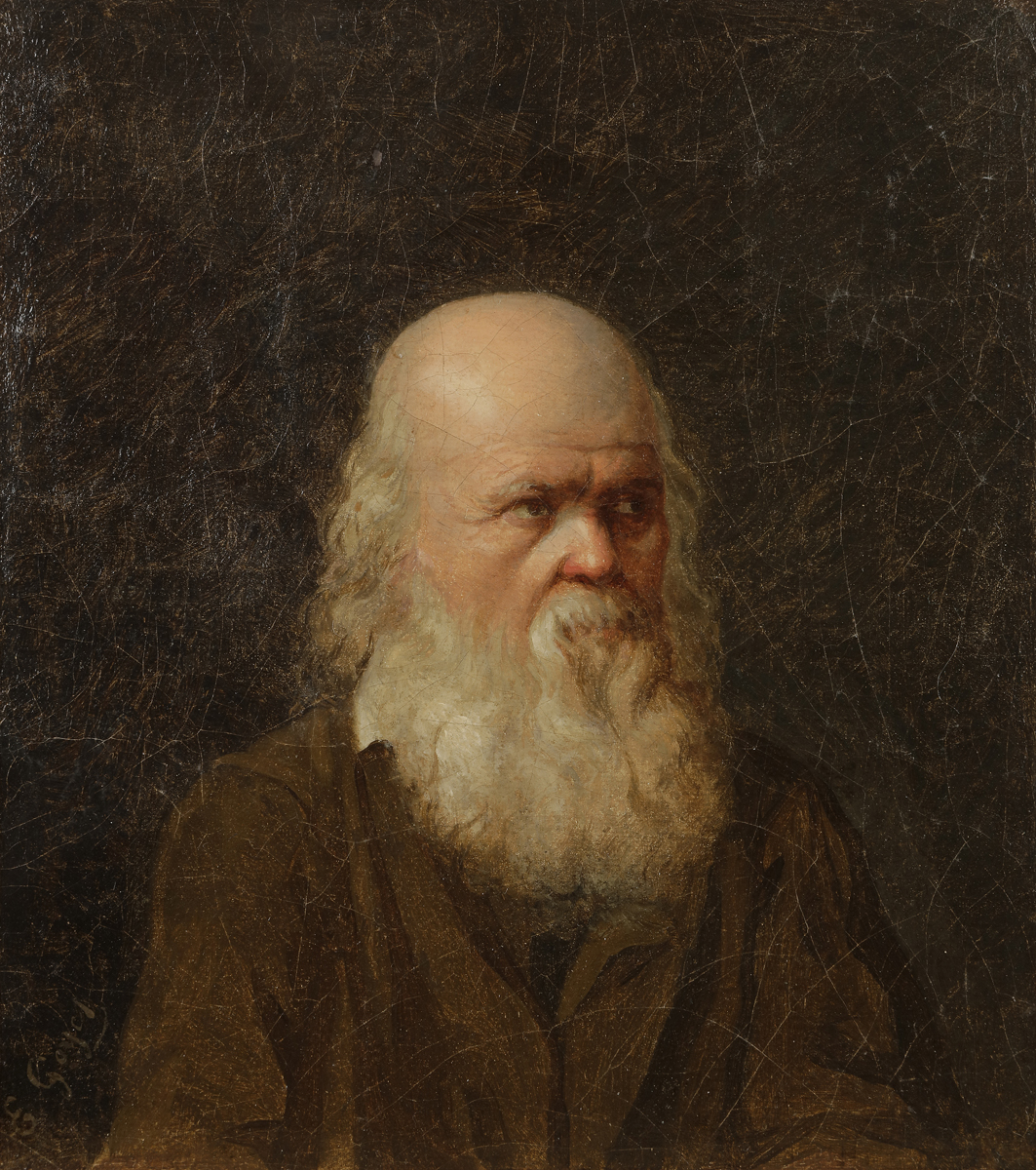
Portrait of an old man, n.d., private collection.

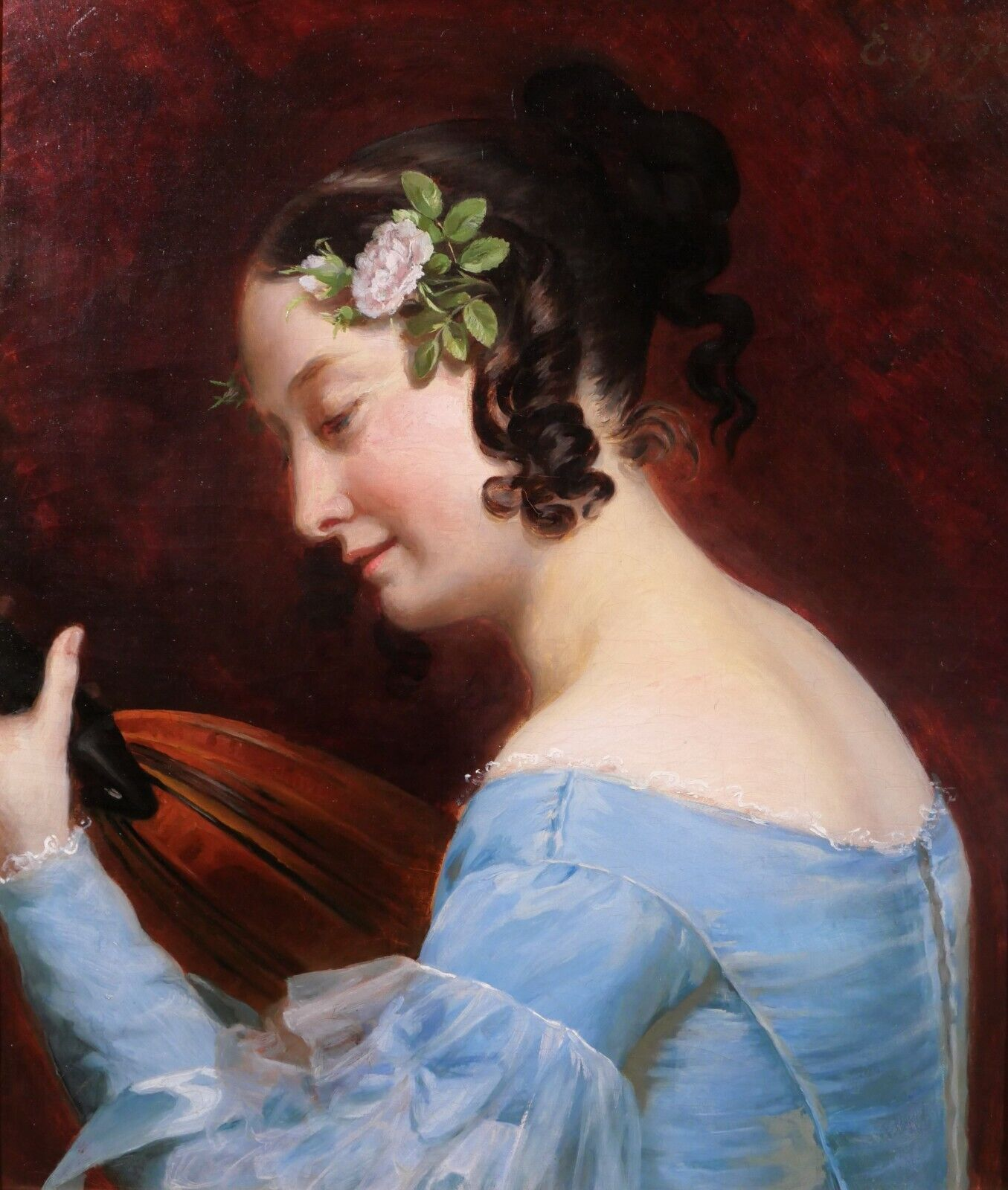
Woman with mandolin, n.d., private collection.

== Bibliography ==
- Bellier de La Chavignerie, Émile; Auvray, Louis. "Goyet (Eugène)" entry in Dictionnaire général des artistes de l'École française depuis l'origine des arts du dessin jusqu'à nos jours: architectes, peintres, sculpteurs, graveurs et lithographes. Paris: 1882–1885, vol. I, p. 684.
