= Jean-Baptiste Goyet =

French artist (1779–1854)

- Born: Jean-Baptiste Goyet; 10 May 1779; Chalon-sur-Saône
- Died: 20 June 1854 (aged 75); Paris
- Education: self-taught
- Works: Le Bouquet du Sentiment, 1816; Héloïse et Abailard, c. 1829; La Sainte-Vierge et Sainte Anne, 1843
- Spouse: Eugénie Goyet (née Demiée)
- Children: Eugène Goyet

Jean-Baptiste Goyet or J.-B. Goyet (10 May 1779 — 20 June 1854) was a self-taught French artist. Beginning in 1827 his work was regularly selected for exhibition in the annual Paris Salon. His genre paintings—variously sentimental, satirical, or historical—reached a wide audience through reproductions using the then-new medium of lithography. His son, Eugène Goyet (1798-1857), also became a painter, with a career that surpassed that of his father. Eugène's wife, Zoé, was also an artist.

== Establishing the Goyet atelier ==
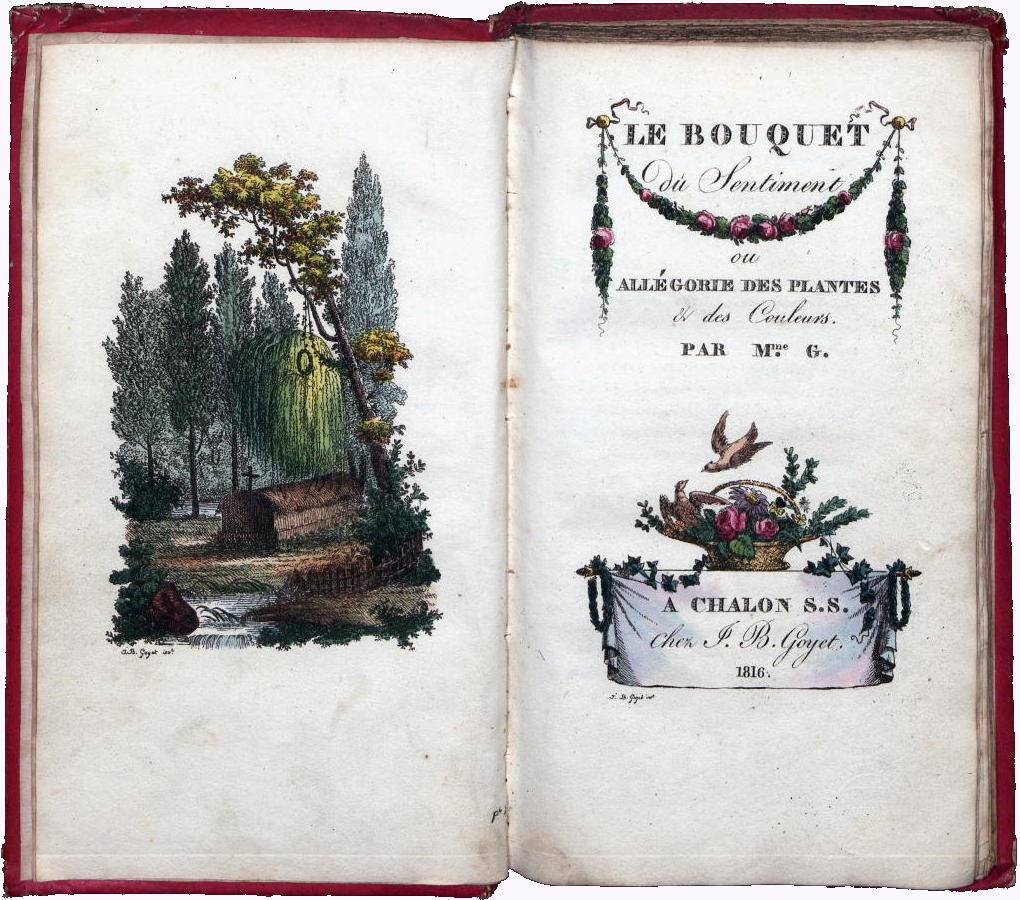
Frontispiece and title page, Le Bouquet du Sentiment by Eugénie Goyet, illustrated and published by Jean-Baptiste Goyet in 1816.

Goyet was a self-taught artist. His first known work was a book he published in 1816 while still living in Chalon-sur-Saône. Goyet provided illustrations and decorations for Le Bouquet du Sentiment, written by his wife, Eugénie (née Demiée, c. 1778-1865). The book was a dictionary of plants with fanciful notes on the allegorical meaning of various flowers, bouquets and colors, including a "charming and very ingenious plant vocabulary by means of which two lovers with a flowerbed at their disposal can spin a perfect amorous intrigue." A reissue of the book in "une nouvelle édition, de luxe" was announced in 1835. The book set a standard for such works for at least seventy years; reviewing Kate Greenaway's Langage des Fleurs in 1885, Lorédan Larchey in Le Monde Illustré advised that readers should, "instead, consult Le Bouquet du Sentiment, published in 1816 by Goyet in Chalon-sur-Saône. Yes, in Chalon-sur-Saône! Kate Greenaway would have done better to copy it."

His son, Eugène, was born when Jean-Baptiste was eighteen years old. When the younger Goyet showed an aptitude for drawing, his father sent him at the age of eighteen to Paris to receive the formal training that he himself lacked. Eugène ranked at the top of his class of sixty students at the atelier of Antoine-Jean Gros.

At some point the Goyet family moved to Paris, taking up residence at 3 Rue de l'Abbaye; in 1837 they moved to 25-27 Rue de la Chausée-D'Antin. Father and son were to have a close lifelong relationship, residing at the same address and working in the same studio. They made their debuts at the Paris Salon in the same year, 1827, when Jean-Baptiste was 48 and Eugène was 29. From that point, both Goyets regularly had works selected for exhibition in the Salons, as did Eugène's wife, Zoé, a portrait artist who specialized in pastels. Jean-Baptiste exhibited 20 paintings at the Salon from 1827 to 1849.

Jean-Baptiste found a patron in Marie-Caroline of Bourbon-Two Sicilies, Duchess of Berry, who recognized and encouraged his early work and later made him curator of her renowned private gallery.

== Subject matter and major works ==
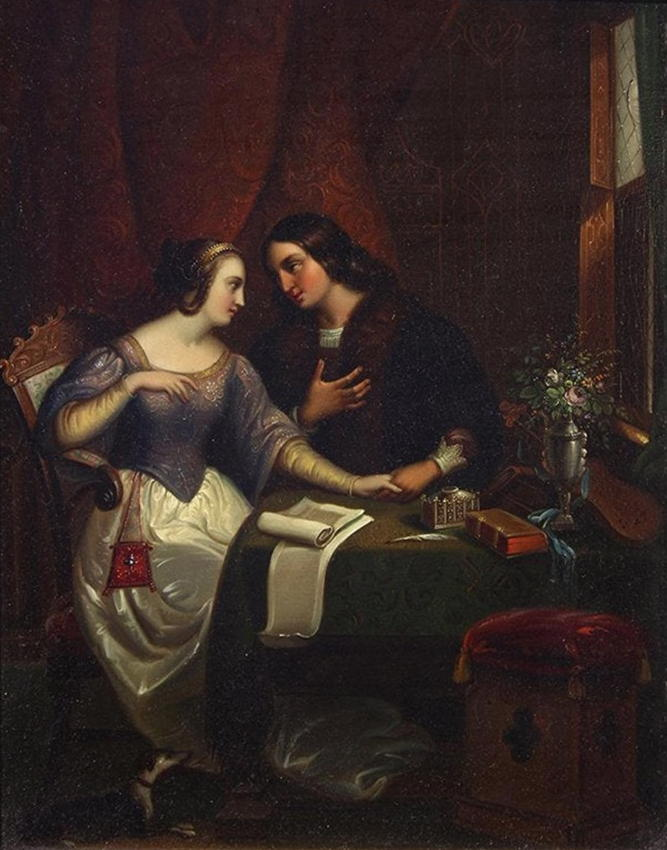
Jean-Baptiste Goyet, Héloïse et Abailard, oil on copper, 1829.

Goyet found success with genre paintings that depicted historical figures, or that captured moments from daily life in a historical setting. A retrospective written in 1881 cited Goyet's works at the Salon of 1831 as his most notable exhibition. These included three "very important works," Marie Louise d’Orléans, reine d’Espagne et Luc Giordano; La Reine Christine de Suède el le Guerchin; and Héloïse et Abailard, depicting the famous lovers as "Héloïse, seduced by the sweet voice and the eloquence of Abailard, listens with all her soul." This small oil on copper painting, exhibited at the Galerie Lebrun and at the Musée Colbert in 1829 before its inclusion at the Salon, was made into a lithograph by Alphonse-Léon Noël, and was later selected by Goyet as his contribution to the Exposition d'Amiens in 1845. The painting may be affiliated with the troubadour style, with its romantic nostalgia for the Middle Ages in France. Its location and appearance long unknown to scholars, Goyet's Héloïse et Abailard was rediscovered at an auction in Oakland, California, in 2020.

In the 1840s, Goyet began a series of allegory paintings. These included l'Histoire de la vie des artistes en quatre figures, with personifications of Hope, Melancholy, Discouragement, and Perseverance, at the Salon of 1842; l'Empire de l’or (1845), inspired by Boileau's epigram, "L'or même à la laideur donne un teint de beauté: Mais tout devient affreux avec la pauvreté" ("Gold gives even ugliness a complexion of beauty: But everything becomes awful with poverty"); and Allegory of the Second Empire, not exhibited at a Salon, but painted sometime between the ascent of Napoleon III in 1852 and Goyet's death in 1854.

Unlike his son, who achieved great success with paintings of saints, Goyet generally eschewed religious subjects. However, his depiction of Mary and her mother framed by images from the life of Christ, La Sainte-Vierge et Sainte Anne, was "said to be his best work." First shown at the Salon of 1843, it was exhibited posthumously in Goyet's honor at the Salon of 1855.

In his lifetime, only a few of Goyet's works were collected by institutions. Une Chapelle (1827) was purchased by the Société des amis des arts. La Lecture d'un Testament (1833) was acquired for the collection of King Louis-Philippe and "miraculously escaped, in 1848, the sack of the Palais-Royal." Un conseil de guerre jugeant un duelliste, sous le règne de Louis XIII (1835) was on the list of paintings that Jules Verne in 1891 argued should be moved from official rooms in the Hôtel-de-Ville of Amiens to the Musée de Picardie, where "all the public could thus benefit."

(Verne also promoted the work of Jean-Baptiste's son, praising Eugène Goyet's Le massacre des Innocents, posthumously exhibited at the Paris Salon of 1857: "Never has this somewhat vulgar subject been treated more dramatically; the scene is vast, the episodes are numerous and varied, and render all the possible situations of this appalling butchery. Mr. Goyet had very little to do to finish this beautiful work, but unfortunately could not enjoy its success.")

== Politics and Society ==
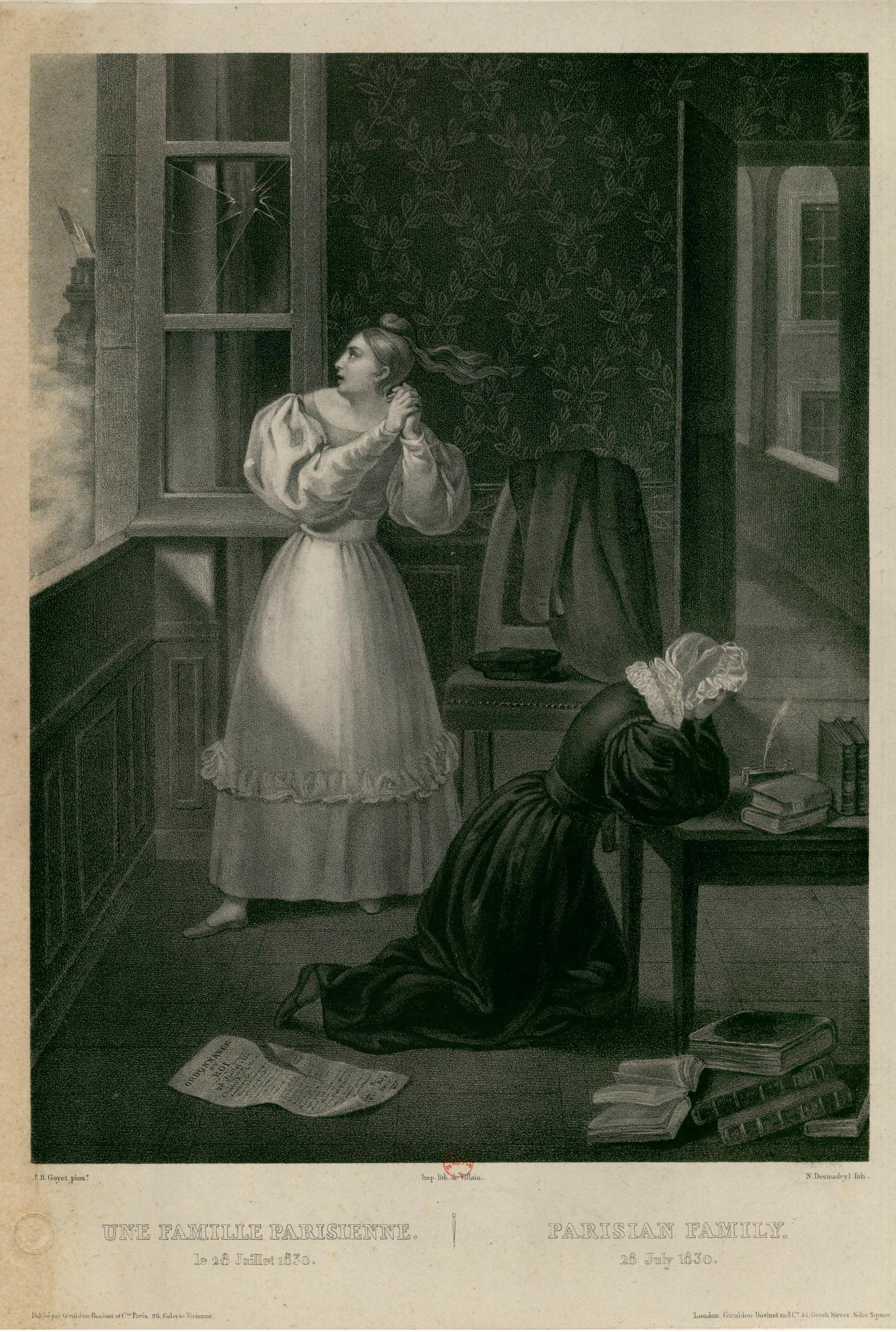
Jean-Baptiste Goyet, Une Famille Parisienne (le 28 Juillet 1830), 1830.

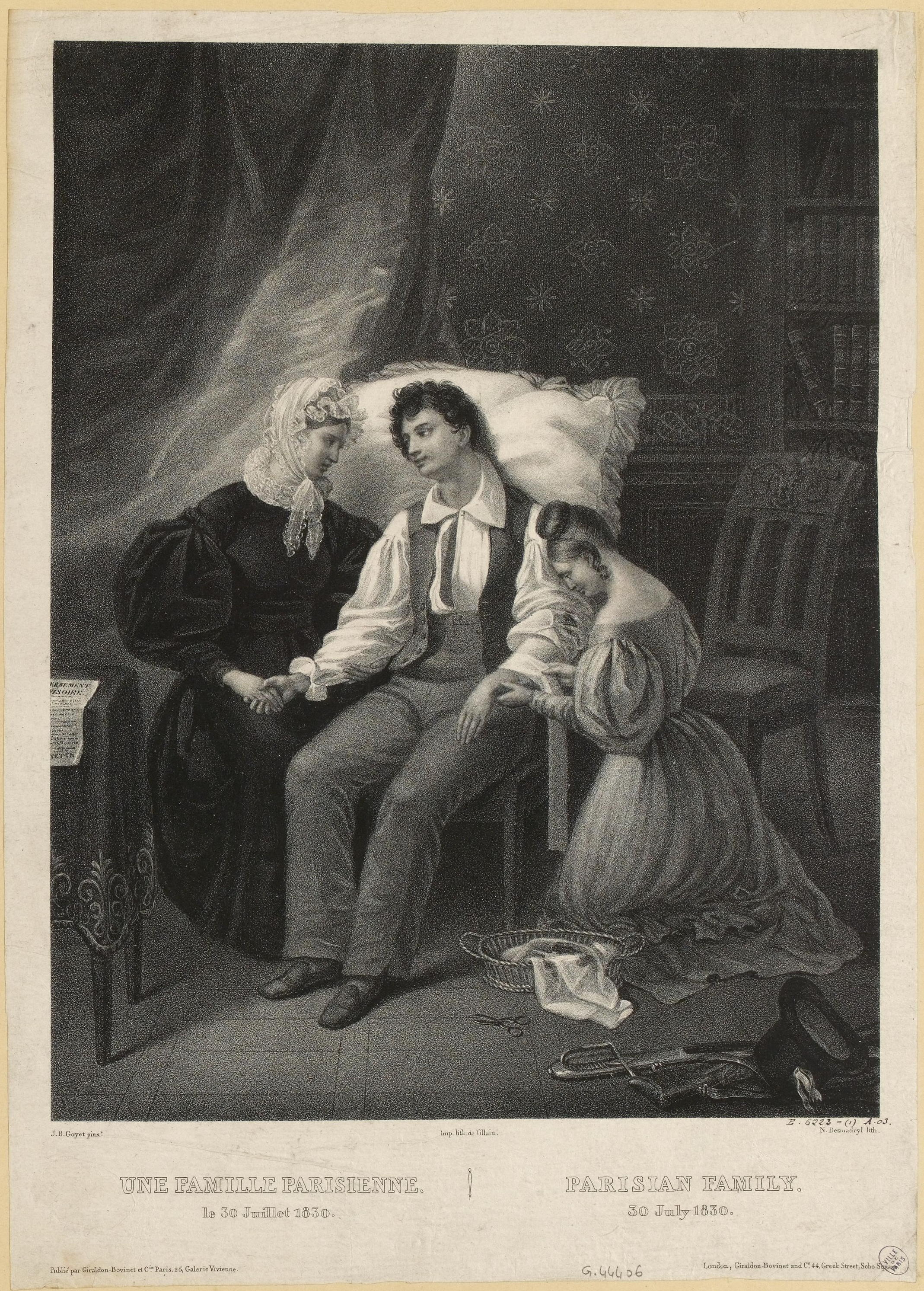
Jean-Baptiste Goyet, Une Famille Parisienne (le 30 Juillet 1830), 1830.

The July Revolution of 1830 in France inspired artists like Delacroix to depict the events with stirring symbolism or with large-scale history paintings. Goyet commemorated the Trois Glorieuses (three glorious days of uprising) with sentimental genre paintings. His series titled Une Famille Parisenne depicts a mother and wife sheltering anxiously in their home, then consoling and bandaging their heroic son and husband on his return from the fray. The works were immediately issued as lithographs for popular consumption.

The Goyets were concerned with the status of women as artists in France. In 1837, at a time when most artists would admit women to their ateliers only as models, Eugène and Zoé opened a new studio at 27 Rue de la Chausée-D'Antin to teach drawing and painting to female students. At least one graduate of Zoé's atelier exhibited at the Paris Salon of 1864.

In 1830, father and son were founding members of the Société libre des beaux-arts de Paris (not be confused with later Société Libre des Beaux-Arts formed in 1868). Jean-Baptiste was appointed to a 10-man committee to consider the question of admitting women to the organization. Their eloquent report came down strongly in favor, but a vote of the membership, "considering that ordinary subjects of deliberation, foreign for the most part to the attributes of their sex, would be almost always devoid of interest for them, decided that this admission would take place only on an honorary basis."

== Legacy ==
Eugène Goyet died less than three years after his father; their Salon careers were essentially parallel, beginning and ending together. Both were buried in the 24th division of Montmartre Cemetery, as was Eugénie Goyet after her death in 1865.

In 1859, Zoé Goyet completed her husband's final commission—of a painting of Christ at Calvary, for La chapelle Notre-Dame du Calvaire, Garbriac, Averyon, France—marking the end of over three decades in which the three Goyets played a prominent role in the world of French art. Zoé died in 1869.

A contemporary critic remarked that the works of Jean-Baptiste Goyet displayed "perhaps a less elevated and less deep talent" than that of his son, but possessed "charming grace and irony." An obituary dismissed his lack of formal training, saying that Goyet "had taken lessons from the best of the masters, having always professed a deep admiration for the masterpieces of the great centuries in our country and abroad. This exquisite feeling for the beautiful and the true is found in all the compositions of this hard-working artist, from those that signaled his debut to the works that marked the end of his career."

At least two portraits of J.-B. Goyet were known in his lifetime. Eugène Goyet exhibited a portrait of his father at the Salon of 1833 (the year Jean-Baptiste turned 54), where it received a silver medal for portraiture. "A striking resemblance, great vigor of effect and execution, conscientious drawing," wrote one critic, "such are the principal qualities that can be seen in the portrait of M. J.-B. Goyet painted by M. E. Goyet, which recalls the fine portraits of the Flemish school." When the portrait was shown in Lille the next year, it was called "one of the most remarkable works of our salon." This portrait was in the atelier on Rue de la Chausée-D'Antin at the time of Eugène's death and may have been included in the public auction of his estate in 1857, but its current location is unknown.

J.-B. Goyet and his wife, Eugénie, were each the subject of a drawing by Clotilde Gerard Juillerat exhibited in the Salon of 1834. The whereabouts of these portraits is unknown.

== Gallery ==
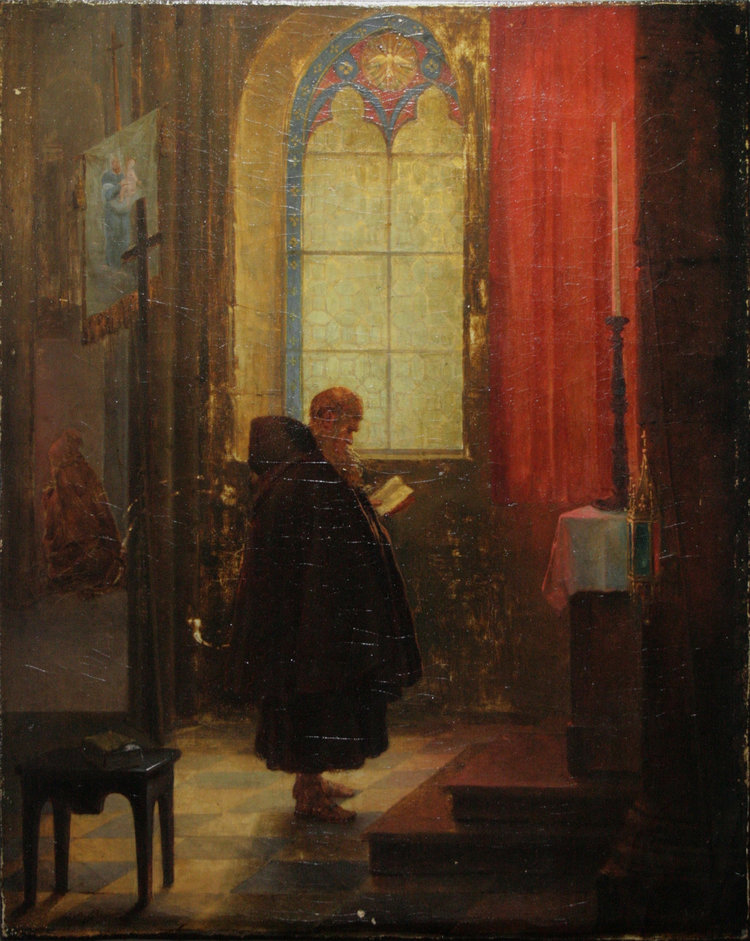
Le Moine; perhaps Une Chapelle, 1827

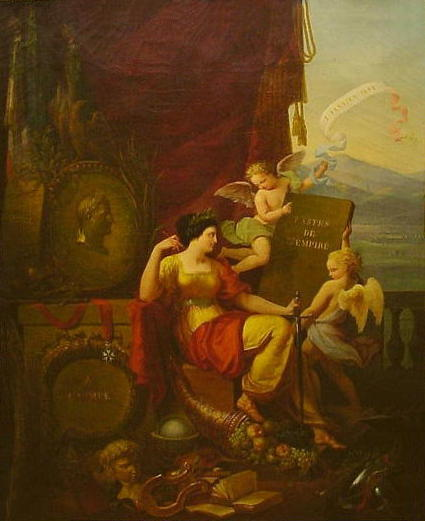
Allegory of the Second Empire, c. 1852–1854, private collection.

== Bibliography ==
- Bellier de La Chavignerie, Émile; Auvray, Louis. "Goyet (Jean-Baptiste)" entry in Dictionnaire général des artistes de l'École française depuis l'origine des arts du dessin jusqu'à nos jours: architectes, peintres, sculpteurs, graveurs et lithographes. Paris: 1882–1885, vol. I, p. 684.
