= Aspremont-Lynden =

Coat of Arms of the Aspremont-Lynden family

The House of Aspremont-Lynden is the name of an important Belgian noble family, which might have originated from the House of Lynden, part of the Dutch nobility. Due to their properties and intermarriages, the family also became part of the German nobility.

== History ==
The proven line starts with Thierry van Lynden (married 1520, died 1566), as the first mentioned member of this family. In 1676 and 1677 nobility decrees of Emperor Leopold I followed for descendants of this family, with the title of Count. Ferdinand von Aspremont-Lynden was the reigning Count of Reckheim and had the Aspremont-Lynden Castle constructed. Since Ferdinand Gobert d'Aspremont Lynden several descendants fought in Austrian service.

By collective Royal Decree of 20 February 1816, Joseph-Ferdinand von Aspremont Lynden (1784–1843) was appointed to the (modern) Knighthood of Namur with the title of Count in Belgium. In the centuries that followed, members held administrative positions at the local, provincial, and national levels. In the 20th century, some members served science.

Christophe Butkens (1590-1650) wrote in his Annales généalogiques de la maison de Lynden that Thierry van Lynden descended from the old noble Van Lynden family from the Northern Netherlands, but this thesis has proved to be untenable. Still later they usurped the name d'Aspremont, as if they descended from the old noble family of that name, but this also turned out to be unproven.

== Notable members ==
- Herman de Lynden (1547–1603), a military leader serving the Prince-Bishopric of Liège and the Holy Roman Empire.
- Ferdinand Gobert, Graf von Aspremont-Lynden-Reckheim (1645–1708) : Imperial Fieldmarshal-Lieutenant.
- Ferdinand Charles, Graf von Aspremont-Lynden-Reckheim (1689–1772) : Imperial Field Marshal and Knight in the Order of the Golden Fleece.
- Guillaume d'Aspremont Lynden (1815–1889) : Belgian minister of foreign affairs (1871–1878).
- Charles d'Aspremont Lynden (1888–1967) : Belgian landowner, politician and cabinet minister.
- Harold Charles d'Aspremont Lynden (1914–1967) : Belgium's last Minister of African Affairs.
- Claude d'Aspremont Lynden (born 1946) : Belgian economist and professor
- Jean d'Aspremont (born 1978) : Professor of Law.

== Sources ==
- Paul Janssens et Luc Duerloo, Armorial de la noblesse belge. Tome A-E. Bruxelles, 1992, pp. 157–158.
- Nico Plomp, 'De oudste generaties van het geslacht Van Lynden', in: Jaarboek Centraal Bureau voor Genealogie 53 (1999), pp. 154–193.
- Jean-François Houtart, Anciennes familles de Belgique, Bruxelles, 2008, p. 146 [anno 1520].
- État présent de la noblesse belge (2017), pp. 87–99.

Media related to Aspremont-Lynden at Wikimedia Commons
