= Herman de Lynden =

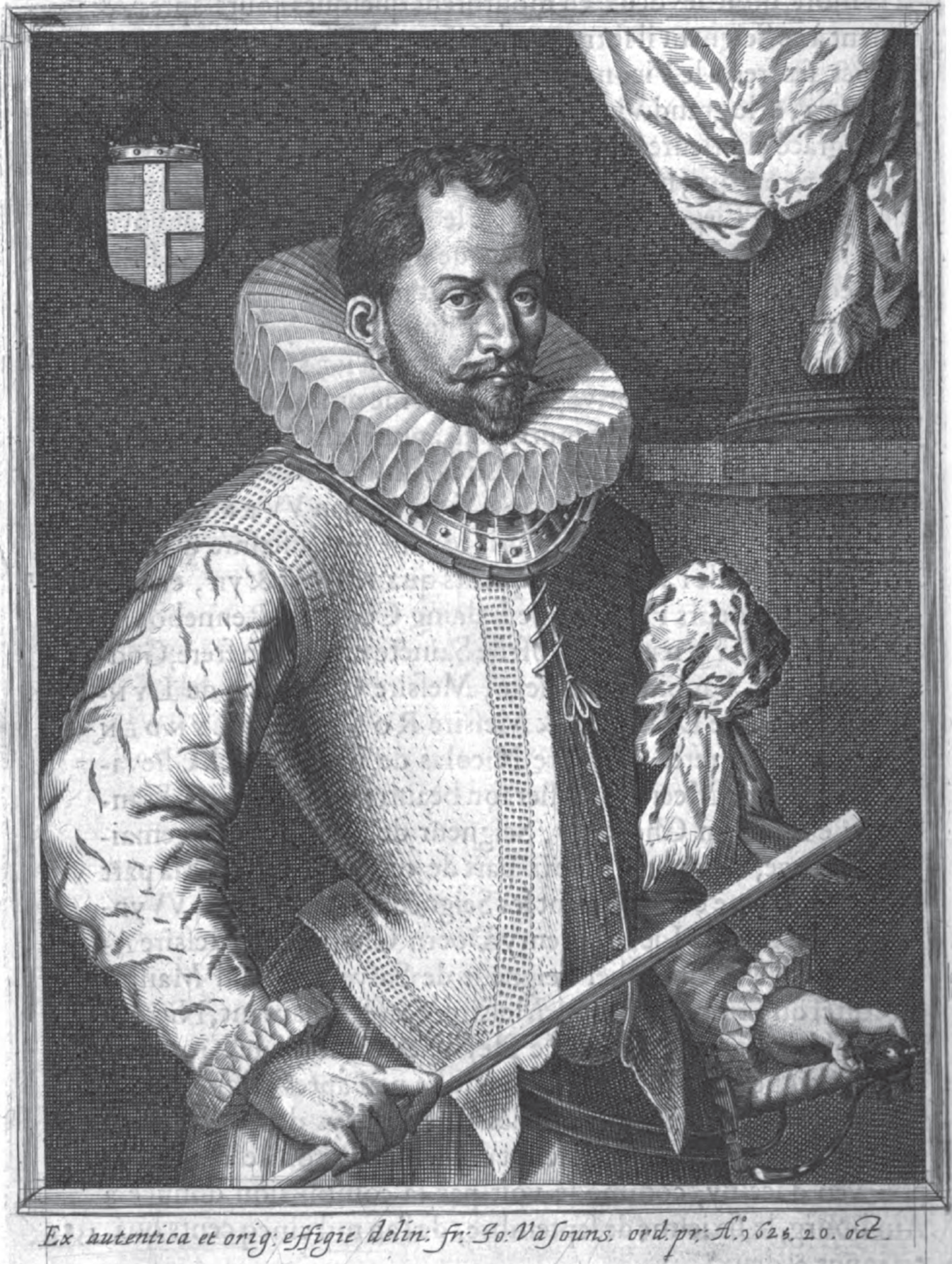
Herman de Lynden

Herman de Lynden (Liège, 1547 – June 5, 1603, Reckheim), baron of Reckheim and of the Holy Roman Empire, was a military leader serving the Prince-Bishopric of Liège and the Holy Roman Empire. He led troops during the Eighty Years' War and the Cologne War. He also held several high-ranking positions, notably Governor of Cologne and Grand-Mayor of Liège.

== Early life ==
Herman was the son of Thierry de Lynden (1491–1566), who had been first State council and Grand-Master to four different Prince-bishops of Liège. After purchasing the Lordship of Rekem, he later obtained from the Holy Roman Emperor the establishment of this domain in free barony of the Empire.

== Italian wars ==
He first served as a soldier in the Italian War of 1551–1559 under the command of famous admiral Andrea Doria, participating among others to the liberation of Porto Ercole, then besieged by Piero Strozzi. After the Italian wars, he served in Hungary until 1567.

== Eighty Years' War ==
After returning to the Low Countries, he participated in the capture of Rotterdam, then received a company of 300 Low Germans to fight with Maximilien de Hénin-Liétard, with whom he participated in the Siege of Mons (1572), the Siege of Haarlem and Noerdange. Subsequently, he participated in the Battle of Mookerheyde, and was responsible for the defense of the Muiderslot, in Muiden.

In 1577, he was named captain of the Halberd guard of Archduke Matthias, and later became counselor of Alexander Farnese, Duke of Parma, then governor of the Southern Netherlands.

== War of Cologne ==
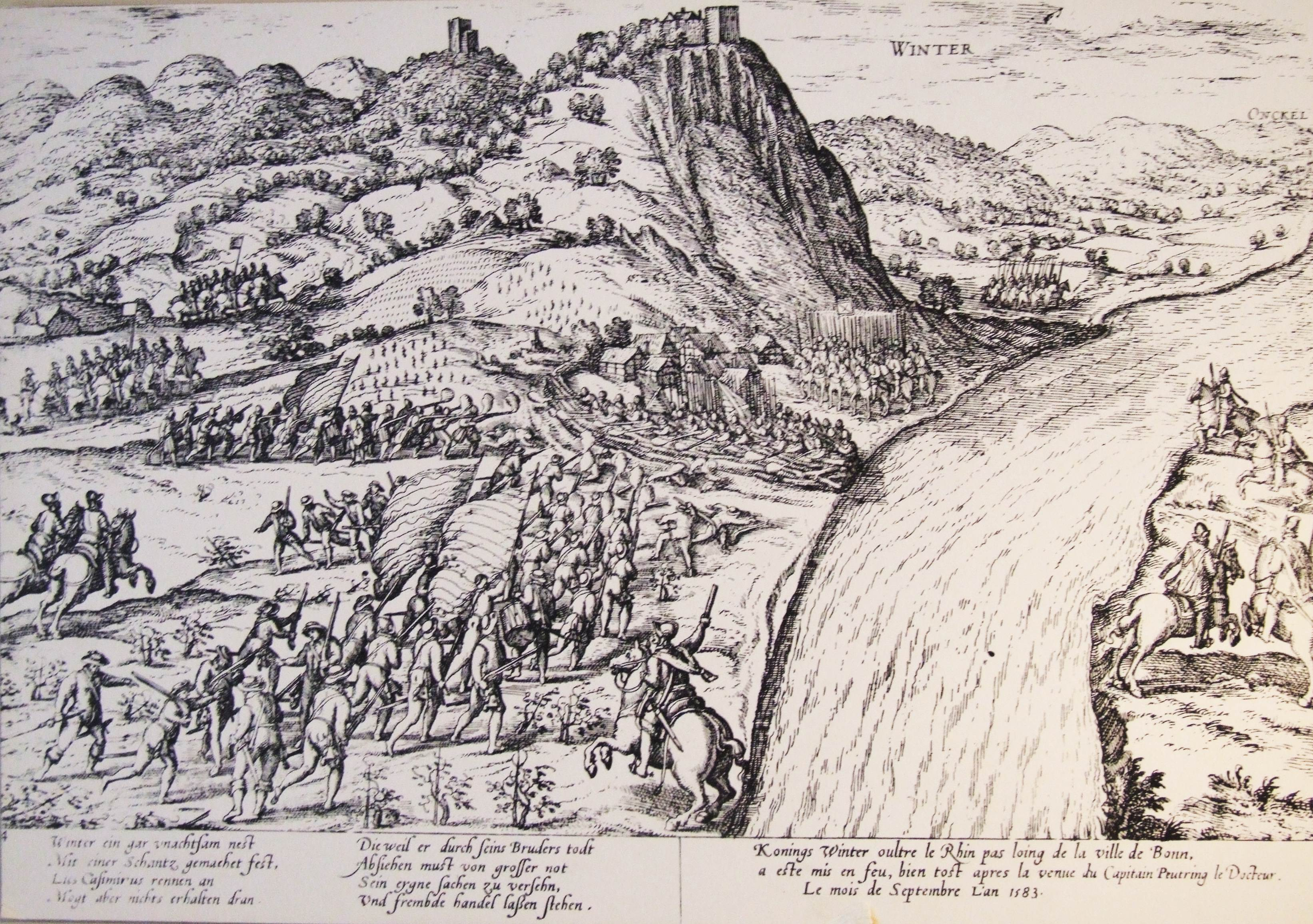
The defense of Königswinter, commanded by Herman de Lynden.

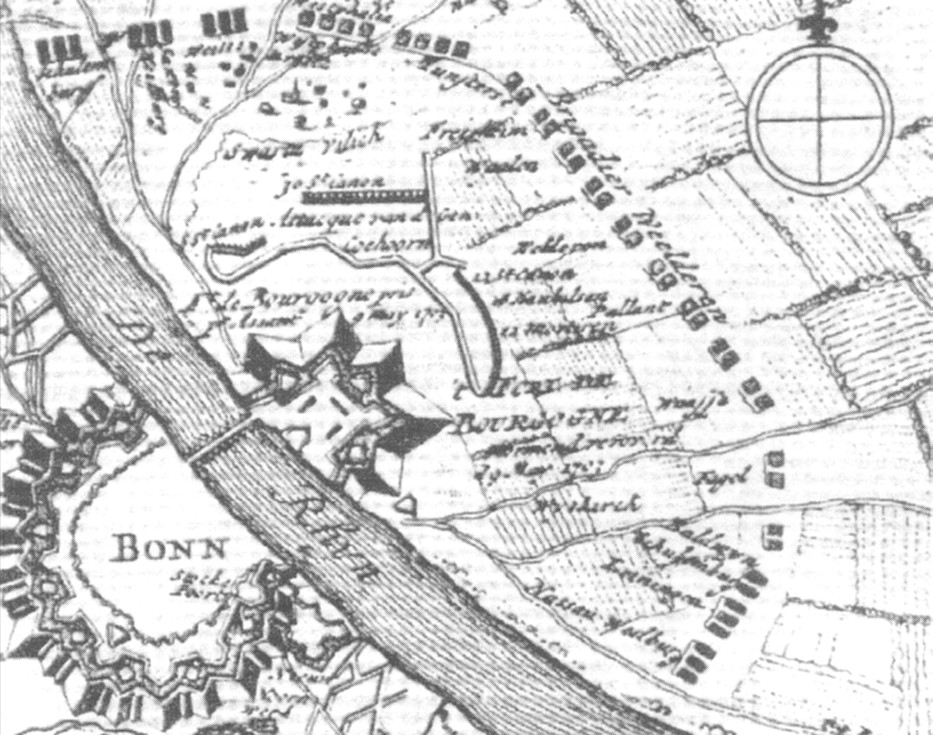
The fort of Beuel, founded in 1583 by Herman de Lynden.

After escaping an assassination attempt on the Duke of Parma in Antwerp, he returned to the court of Prince-bishop Ernest of Bavaria in Liège. Ernest named him colonel and member of his State council and his Privy council.

On June 12, 1583, after learning that John Casimir of the Palatinate-Simmern is marching towards Cologne, Ernest of Bavaria orders colonel Herman de Lynden to assemble a regiment of 3000 infantry and a company of horsemen, and to hurry towards Sechtem (nowadays part of Bornheim). Eleven days later, Herman had assembled the regiments, and after regrouping them in Brühl, he joined the armies in Sechtem. Amongst the soldiers under Herman de Lynden's orders was soon-to-become-famous Johann Tserclaes, Count of Tilly.

Herman de Lynden crossed to the east bank of the Rhine, and successfully stop the armies of John Casimir of the Palatinate-Simmern in Königswinter, Beuel, Altwied (nowadays part of Neuwied) and Feldkirchen. In doing so, he managed to return large portions of land of Cologne to the catholic side. On November 17, 1583, during the 1st Siege of Bonn, he conquered Rheindorf, and built a fort along the rhine in Beuel, across the river from Bonn. This allowed him to control the river access to the city, which helped secure the rendition of Karl von Waldburg (brother of Gebhard), on January 28, 1584. On January 8, 1592, Herman de Lynden was named governor and captain general of Cologne, and settled in Bonn and Poppelsdorf.

== Family ==
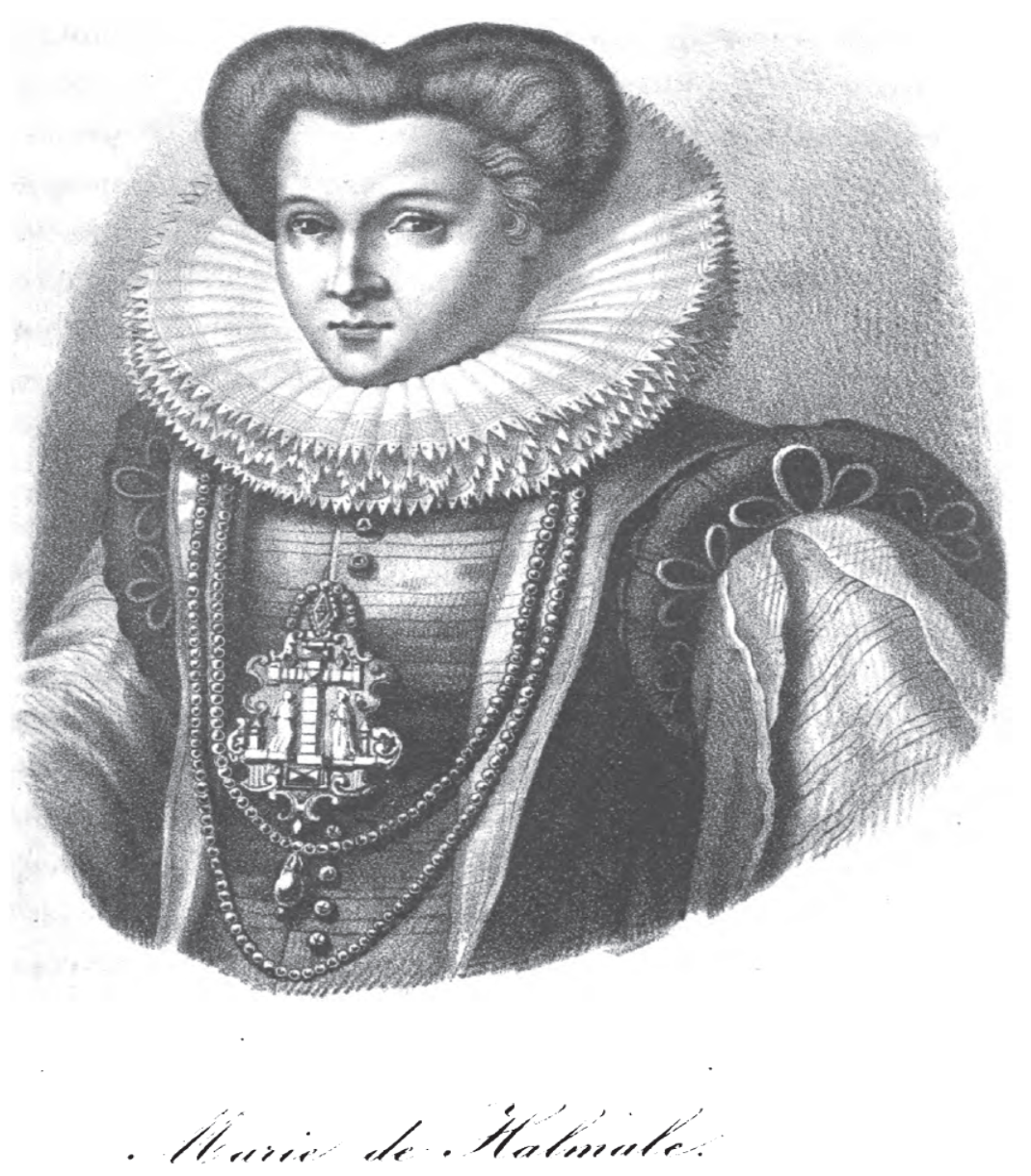
Marie de Halmale

He married Marie de Halmale, daughter of Constantin de Halmale and Catherine Van de Werve, on November 9, 1581.
They had seven children, including:

- Ernest de Lynden (1570–1636), Second baron of Reckheim

== See also ==
- Aspremont-Lynden Castle

== Links ==
- Wikisource page on the National Biography of Belgium

== Bibliography ==
- Notice Historique sur l'ancien Comté impérial de Reckheim, Gand, 1848
