= Patrick M.M.A. Bringmans =

Belgian archaeologist

Patrick M.M.A. Bringmans was born 28 November 1970 in Hasselt, Belgium to Albert and Elly Bringmans-Jans. He is a Belgian archaeologist and paleoanthropologist whose main field of study has been the Palaeolithic period.

== Education ==
Bringmans enrolled at the Katholieke Universiteit Leuven, Belgium, where he received a bachelor's degree in archaeology and art history and where he received a master's degree in archaeology.

Bringmans then continued at the same university at the Laboratory of Prehistory (Dir. Prof. Dr. (now Emeritus) Pierre M. Vermeersch), where he spent his early career, for a Ph.D. in archaeology. His doctoral dissertation (2006) read: "Multiple Middle Palaeolithic Occupations in a Loess-soil Sequence at Veldwezelt-Hezerwater, Limburg, Belgium".

Patrick M.M.A. Bringmans wrote his dissertation under the direction of Prof. Dr. Pierre M. Vermeersch, a Belgian geographer and archaeologist who had been trained in European prehistoric archaeology by Belgian geologist Frans Gullentops and French prehistorian François Bordes. Vermeersch worked on both the Paleolithic of Europe and Africa.

Patrick M.M.A. Bringmans is also the author of veldwezelt-hezerwater.blogspot.

== Archaeological work ==
Dr. Bringmans has excavated widely on prehistoric Belgian and Egyptian sites including Veldwezelt-Hezerwater, Belgium and Sodmein Cave, Egypt. Bringmans was the field director of excavations at the Middle Paleolithic site of Veldwezelt-Hezerwater from 1998 to 2005. He has also been co-director of the "Belgian Middle Egypt Prehistoric Project" in 1999 and 2001. This research project of the Katholieke Universiteit Leuven was established in 1976 by Prof. Dr. Pierre M. Vermeersch, who remained the head-director until 2003.

In 2006, Bringmans was appointed as Head Curator at the archaeological museum in Heerlen, The Netherlands.

In 2008, Dr. Bringmans was invited to serve as a Guest Professor of Paleoanthropology at the Katholieke Universiteit Leuven, Belgium.

== Archaeological theories ==
Bringmans' research and teaching interests include archaeological method and theory, Quaternary research, geoarchaeology, especially loess-stratigraphy and paleosols, lithic technology, dating methods in archaeology and human evolution.

The majority of Bringmans' archaeological work has been centered on Neandertals in Western Europe, and more particularly on the stone tools, which are thought to have been the primary mode of their "technology complex".

One of his main research interests concerns the changing pattern of human dispersal under shifting late Middle and Late Pleistocene climates in NW Europe. In his Ph.D. dissertation Bringmans has combined climatic modeling, geology, archaeology and oxygen isotope analysis to find out when and how NW Europe could have been occupied by Neandertals.

He claims that terrestrial sediment archives (e.g. loess) provide detailed records of past climatic variability and change on millennial and sub-millennial time scales. Climate-proxy records can be obtained from most terrestrial sediments, as has been the case at Veldwezelt-Hezerwater.

Bringmans believes that NW Europe was too hostile for humans during the interglacial/glacial climate extremes. He also claims that NW Europe seems to have been a bit of a wasteland during much of the late Middle and Late Pleistocene as well.

According to Bringmans, only a few well-preserved archaeological sites such as Veldwezelt-Hezerwater, Maastricht-Belvédère and Dahlen, Meudt offer unique snapshots of Middle Paleolithic people appearing in NW Europe for a short spell and then going away again.

Bringmans claims that the number of Neandertals present in NW Europe may have fluctuated significantly from one period to the next, especially near the margins of ecological tolerance.

== Selected bibliography ==
- Bringmans, P.M.M.A., Vermeersch, P.M., Gullentops, F., Groenendijk, A.J., Meijs, E.P.M., de Warrimont, J.-P. & Cordy, J.-M. 2003. Preliminary Excavation Report on the Middle Palaeolithic Valley Settlements at Veldwezelt-Hezerwater (prov. of Limburg). Archeologie in Vlaanderen - Archaeology in Flanders 1999/2000 VII: 9-30.
- Bringmans, P.M.M.A., Vermeersch, P.M., Groenendijk, A.J., Meijs, E.P.M., de Warrimont, J.-P. & Gullentops, F. 2004. The Late Saalian Middle Palaeolithic "Lower-Sites" at Veldwezelt-Hezerwater (Limburg - Belgium). In: Le Secrétariat du Congrès (eds), Acts of the XIVth UISPP Congress, University of Liège, Belgium. September 2–8, 2001. Section 5: The Middle Palaeolithic. Oxford. British Archaeological Reports (BAR) International Series 1239: 187-195.

== See also ==
- Veldwezelt-Hezerwater
- Middle Paleolithic
- Archaeology
- Stone Age
- Levallois technique
- Neanderthal
- Paleoanthropology
- Prepared-core technique

== Sources ==
- http://www.kuleuven.be/doctoraatsverdediging/cm/3E98/3E980460.htm
