= Halmale =

Coat of arms of the House of van Halmale

Halmale or de/van Halmale is the name of a Flemish noble family, some of whom were knighted. Notable people with the name include:

- House of van Halmale, the van Halmale family history
- Costen van Halmale (approx. 1432–1508), mayor of Antwerp
- Hendrik van Halmale I (1549–1614), mayor of Antwerp
- Hendrik van Halmale (bishop) (1549–1640), bishop of Ypres
