= Aspremont-Lynden Castle =

Castle in Limburg, Belgium

- Belgium
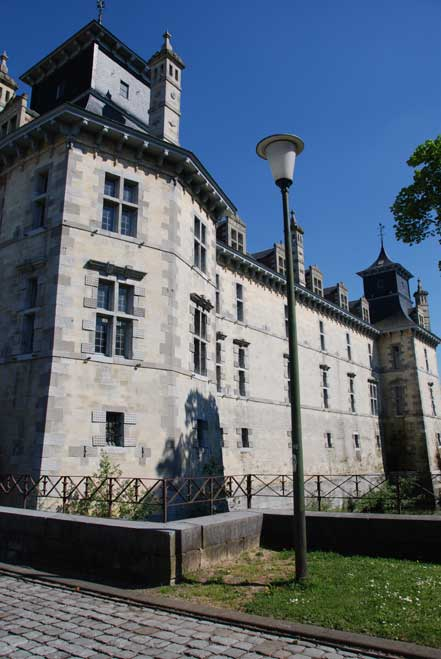

Site information
- Type: Castle

Location
- Coordinates: 50.924444°N 5.705556°E

Aspremont-Lynden Castle (Dutch: Kasteel d'Aspremont-Lynden) is a castle in Oud-Rekem in the municipality of Lanaken, province of Limburg, Belgium.

The present castle, on the site of a mediaeval predecessor, was constructed by the noble family of d'Aspremont Lynden, Counts of Reckheim, in the early 17th century, in the Mosan style.

The building served during the 19th and 20th centuries as a prison and a psychiatric hospital.

== See also ==
- List of castles in Belgium

== Sources ==
- Inventaris: Kasteel d'Aspremont-Lynden (in Dutch)
