= Jean d'Aspremont =

Legal theorist and international lawyer

Jean Marie Gobert Count d'Aspremont Lynden (Brussels, January 17, 1978) is a lawyer and professor of international legal theory at Sciences Po in Paris, at the University of Manchester and at the Graduate Institute of International and Development Studies in Geneva.

== Life ==
D'Aspremont holds a law degree from University College London, an LL.M. from Cambridge University and a Ph.D. from the Université catholique de Louvain. He holds a chair of public international law at the University of Manchester, where he co-founded the Manchester International Law Centre with Iain Scobbie. Before joining Sciences Po in 2018, he was a professor of international legal theory at the University of Amsterdam, which he joined in 2009. He is also a member of the Royal Holland Society of Sciences and Humanities.

He is General Editor of the Cambridge Studies in International and Comparative Law and Director of Oxford International Organizations.

In 2017, he was awarded the James Crawford Prize for the article "The International Court of Justice and the Irony of System-Design" in the Journal of International Dispute Settlement.

== Selected publications ==
- L'état non démocratique en droit international. Etude critique du droit international positif et de la pratique contemporaine. Paris, 2008.
- Formalism and the sources of international law. A theory of the ascertainment of legal rules. Oxford, 2011.
- Epistemic forces in international law. Foundational doctrines and techniques of international legal argumentation. Cheltenham / Northampton, 2015.
- Non-State Actors and the Formation of International Customary Law: Unlearning Some Common Tropes. Manchester, 2017.
- International law as a belief system. Cambridge / New York, 2018.
