= Edgar Willems =

Belgian musician and artist

Edgar Willems (13 October 1890 in Lanaken, Limburg, Belgium – 18 June 1978 in Geneva, Switzerland) was an artist, musician and music educator, famous for being at the origin of a method of musical education.
