= Ignace Schops =

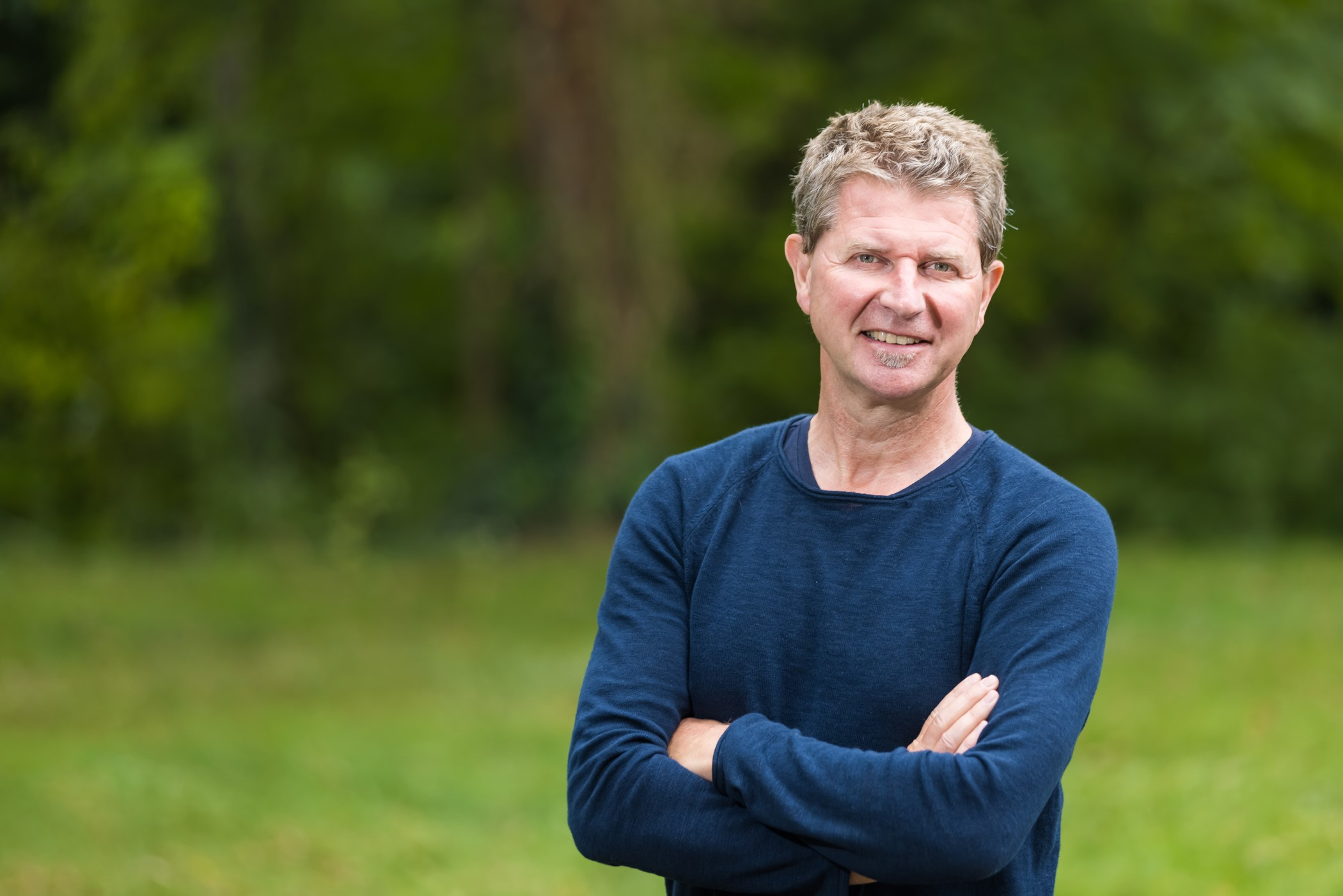
- Schops (2021)
- Born: 1964 (age 61–62); Heusden-Zolder, Limburg, Belgium
- Education: herpetologist
- Occupation: director of Regionaal Landschap Kempen en Maasland
- Awards: Goldman Environmental Prize

Ignace Schops (born 1964) is a Belgian environmentalist, a biodiversity, landscaping and herpetology expert. He is Director of the Belgian NGO Regionaal Landschap Kempen en Maasland (RLKM), President of Bond Beter Leefmilieu (BBL), Chair of The Weaving Lab Foundation and was the President of the largest network on the natural heritage in Europe, EUROPARC federation, from 2014 until 2021; and a full member of the EU chapter of Club of Rome.

Schops was awarded the Goldman Environmental Prize, better known as the Green Nobel Prize in 2008, for his contributions to the establishment of the Hoge Kempen National Park, the first national park of Belgium. Later that year, he was selected as Ashoka fellow, world-leading social entrepreneur. In 2010 he became one of the eight global ambassadors for the IUCN countdown 2010 initiative.

Besides these international awards, he got several national awards, including: Gulden Spoor – Golden Holidaymaker – Sustainable tourism ambassador. Due to his international work on biodiversity and social entrepreneurship, he became an Honorary Doctor for the University of Hasselt in 2011. Ignace Schops is a full member of the Club of Rome, EU Chapter. In June 2013, he became part of the Climate Leadership Corps of Al Gore. In November 2013, Ignace Schops was decorated by the Belgian King Filip as Commander of the Order of the Crown.

Ignace Schops is one of the initiators of the "KLIMAATZAAK" (2014), a climate court case against the Belgian Governments (4) for not fulfilling their climate obligations.

In 2017, he was selected in the top 25 of most influential Belgians in the world by Charlie Magazine (13th place). Also in 2017, Ignace Schops became a member of the "Rewilding Circle" of Rewilding Europe. In 2019, his organization RLKM was awarded by the Flemish Parliament with the "Golden Honorary Award" (Gouden Erepenning) for long-lasting outstanding environmental achievements. In November 2021, Ignace Schops was awarded for his achievements out of the economical sector with the prestigious "Etion Leadership Award"

The success of his work is based on the (Re)connection Model, which tries to (Re)connect nature with society. This model has four principles:

- (Re)connect nature with nature
- (Re)connect people with nature
- (Re)connect business with nature
- (Re)connect policy with practice

Schops is the author and co-author of several books and articles on herpetology, nature conservation, landscaping, social entrepreneurship, sustainable tourism, etc. Related to and launched at the UN Earth Summit in Rio de Janeiro 2012 he was selected to write a contribution in the book Green Growth and travelism, Letters from leaders.

Schops is often asked as a keynote speaker for international conferences. He gave presentations at: Earth Summit Rio +20 – Brazil; World Conservation Congress (WCC) IUCN Jeju, South Korea; Change nation in Ireland; World Exhibition Shanghai in China; World Nature Summit – Convention on Biological Diversity, World Nature Summit, Nagoya, Japan; World Congress Ashoka, Paris on social entrepreneurship; International Conferences at EU level.
