= Hoge Kempen National Park =

First National Park in Flanders, Belgium

- IUCN category II (national park)
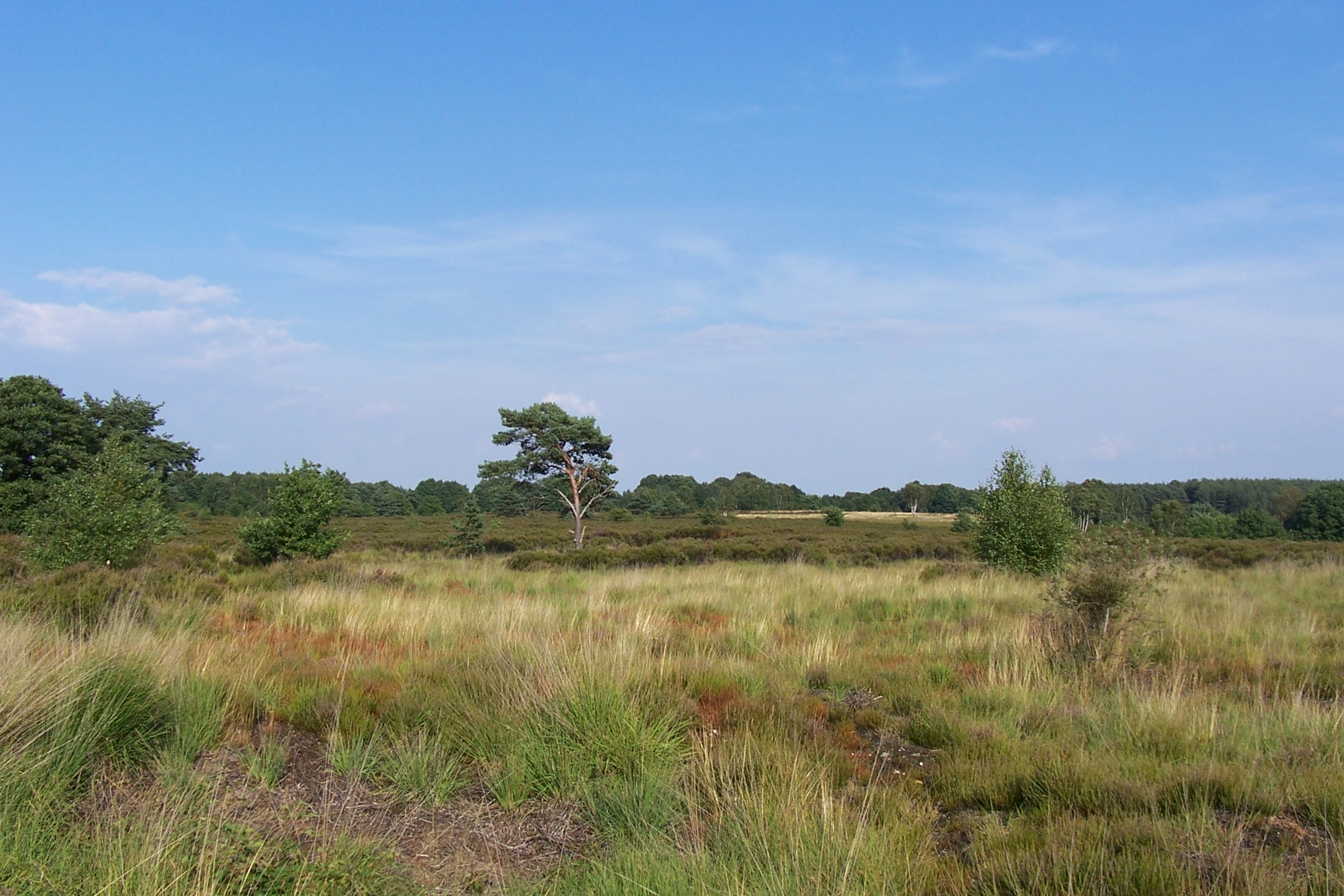
- Heathland in the Hoge Kempen (Mechelse Heide)

- Location within Belgium
- Location: Limburg, Flemish Region, Belgium
- Nearest city: Genk
- Coordinates: 51°00′N 5°40′E
- Area: 67 km^{2} (26 sq mi)
- Established: 2006
- Visitors: 700,000 (in 2010)
- Governing body: Agentschap voor Natuur en Bos

Hoge Kempen National Park (Nationaal Park Hoge Kempen) is the first National Park in Flanders, Belgium. It is located in the Campine in the East of the Province of Limburg, between Genk and the river Meuse (Dutch: Maas) Valley. It includes the elevated ground that defines the watershed between that river and the low ground of the drainage basin of the river Demer that covers most of Belgian Limburg.

== History ==
It was opened on Sunday 29 March 2006. Covering 67 square kilometres, it forms part of the Natura 2000 network. The area is mostly heathland and pine forest. It was first established in 1990 within the Regionaal Landschap Kempen en Maasland as part of a progressive policy to advance nature reserves in Flanders.

In May 2011 it was placed on UNESCO's Tentative List for consideration as a World Heritage site. On 23 March 2012, the nine municipal councils, the Province of Limburg and the Flemish government signed a letter of intent to support the application of the Hoge Kempen National Park for recognition as UNESCO World Heritage.

The national park has revealed plans to expand its territory to more than 100 square kilometres.

In the 1990s, the park was the place of origin of the now-widespread numbered-node cycle network. Designer Hugo Bollen wanted something short; he felt it was important that the signage not contain too much information. RLKM estimates that the network brings 16.5 million euros of revenue to Kempen in Maasland annually.

== Geography ==
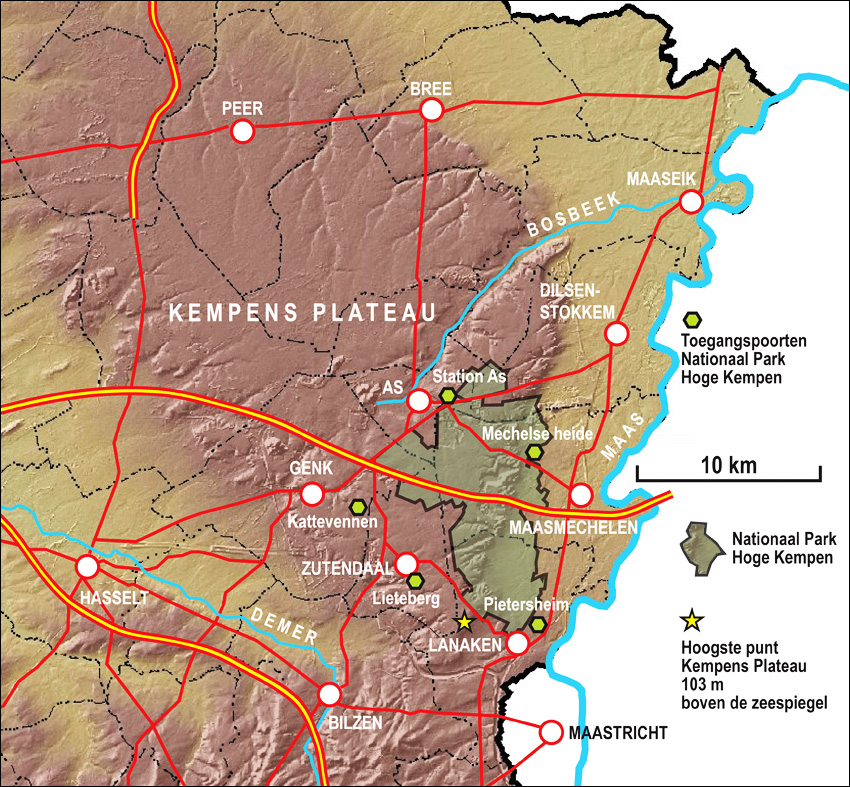
Map of Hoge Kempen National Park

The park is in the province of Limburg, covering territory in the municipalities of As, Dilsen-Stokkem, Genk, Lanaken, Maasmechelen and Zutendaal. As well as extensive woodlands, it includes existing protected natural areas such as the Mechelse Heide, Zipebeek Valley (de Vallei van de Ziepbeek), Bog under the Mountain (het Ven onder de Berg) and the Neerharer Heide.

The Hoge Kempen (or Kempens Plateau) is a large area of scree formed from rocks that were deposited in the Ardennes by the Meuse during the last Ice Age in the south east of Limburg and covered with sand blown by sea winds. Over time a relatively deep valley was eroded by the Grensmaas. The slope of the plateau to the west of the Maas valley is steep and rises 45 metres to form a step of sorts. This step runs 20 kilometres from Opoeteren at Maaseik near Lanaken in the north to Gellik in the south. Over half of this step lies within the park and the height of land above this reaches 102 metres.

The area is crossed by several major highways that presented a challenge as to how to maintain eco-diversity across the fragmented parkland. Construction took place of the Kikbeek eco-velo-duct over the E314 near Maasmechelen and also near Zutendaal. The Toeristiche Weg built 60 years ago on the Mechelse Heide was closed to road traffic as part of the park planning. This paved road will become part of the Limburg cycling network. West of the Kikbeek eco-duct will be a eco-valley and another eco-duct over the E314.

Another element to aid the recovery of the park was the restoration of the source of the Kikbeek at Opgrimbie. This resulted in the upper course of the brook being redesigned with a controllable flow that helped restore the natural water level in the area. Due to years of excavation of white sand evidenced by the many craters, the water level had fallen. Inside the boundaries of the park there are still some enclaves where there are some residences, gravel and sand quarries and industrial zones. The Government of Flanders currently owns 85% of the land in the park.

== Ecology ==
The habitat is mostly coniferous trees and heath land. There are some deciduous trees, dunes, marshes, streams, dry valleys, ponds, gravel pits and former mine spoil heaps. Typical flora and fauna include juniper; gorse; bell heather; sweet gale; club moss; asphodel; dragonfly; silver studded blue butterfly; swallow tail butterfly; Granville fritillary butterfly; Moor frog; Natterjack toad; Smooth snake; Common lizard; Brook Lamprey; Black woodpecker; Red Fox; Pine marten; Nightjar and Roe deer.

== Tourism ==
The park is open to the general public and each municipality has its own gateway to the park. These are:

- Connecterra: The gateway at the border between the municipalities of Maasmechelen and Dilsen-Stokkem acts as the main gate of the national park.
- Kattevennen: This is the gateway in Genk and is themed on the cosmos. Here is the Cosmodrome and a recreation area.
- Mechelse Heide: The gateway in Maasmechelen leads to the Mechelse Heide nature reserve, a vast purple heath land.
- Pietersheim: The gateway in Lanaken is located in the Pietersheim castle, which is a Romanesque castle ruin at the Pietersembos.
- The Lieteberg: The gateway in Zutendaal has the theme of the insect world. The visitor center is located in an old gravel pit that was once a mating station for bees.
- Station As: The gateway in As has the theme of the industrial past of the region. The lookout tower at the former As station resembles a coal drilling tower typical of a century ago.

There is a 200 km network of hiking trails within the national park. Some 40 loop-shaped walks were designed with a length between 3 and 14 km. The start of these hiking trails is at one of the 6 entrance gates. The cycle paths in the national park form part of the numbered-node cycle network, the Kempen and Maasland Regional Landscape part. In addition, within the national park there is a 140 km network of mostly unpaved bridleways and paths that connects the rider and heart of the Limburg Kempen. These are organized via a node system similar to the cycle node network.

Since 2022 Cyclo-cross Maasmechelen which is a cyclo-cross race part of the UCI Cyclo-cross World Cup has been held in the park.

Support from the European Union has meant that there are a number of Rangers on hand to help all visitors.

== Awards ==
In April 2008, project manager Ignace Schops received the Goldman Environmental Prize (the "Green Nobel Prize") in San Francisco. Schops and his RLKM project group got this prestigious award for the original way they managed to protect a large area of valuable nature in a relatively densely populated area. It recognized the concept of integrating nature, agriculture, economy and tourism. On 7 May 2008 he was honored in the European Parliament, also as an example project where public authorities and private initiatives cooperated successfully.

== Gallery ==
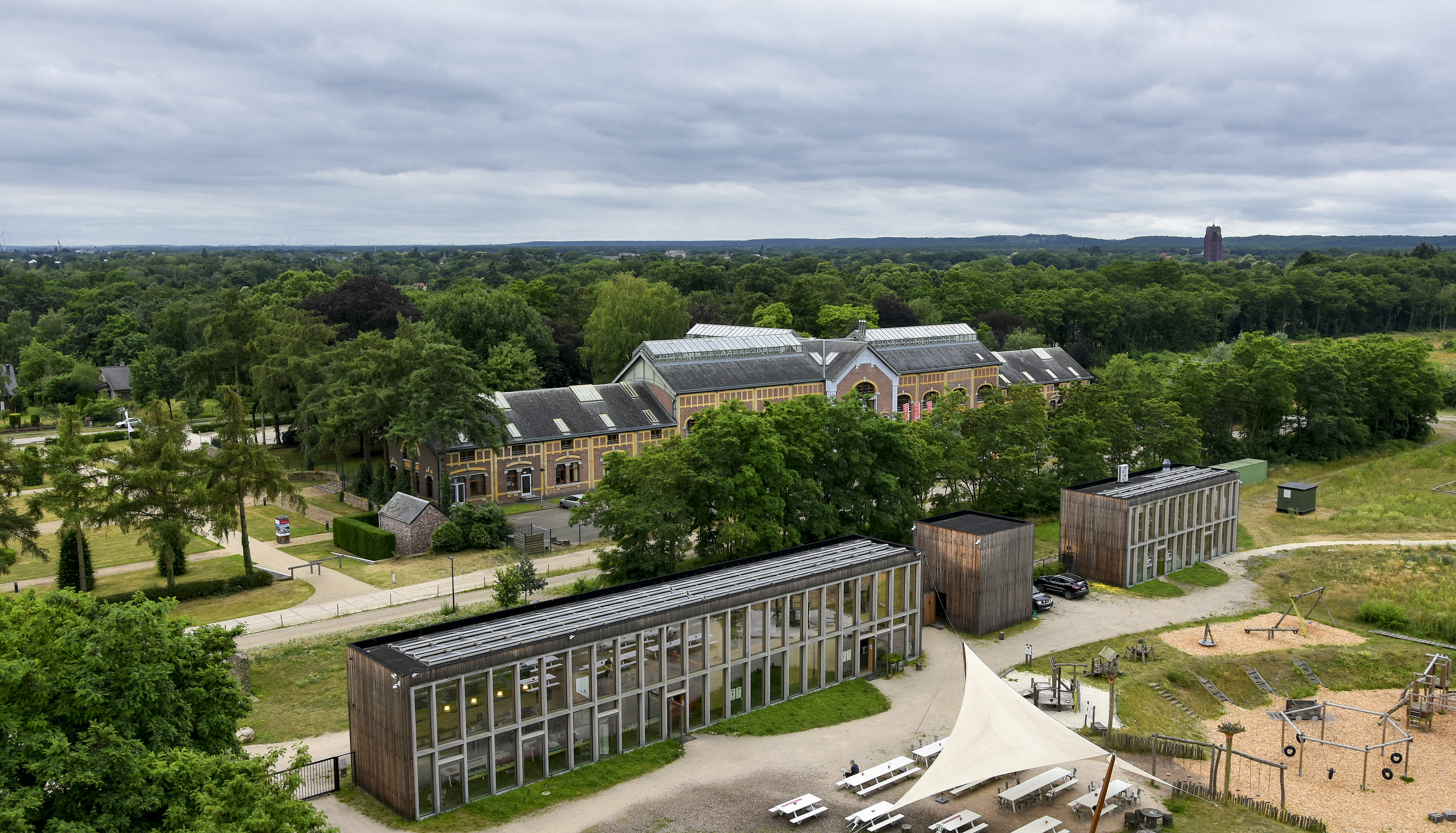
Connecterra, a gate to Hoge Kempen

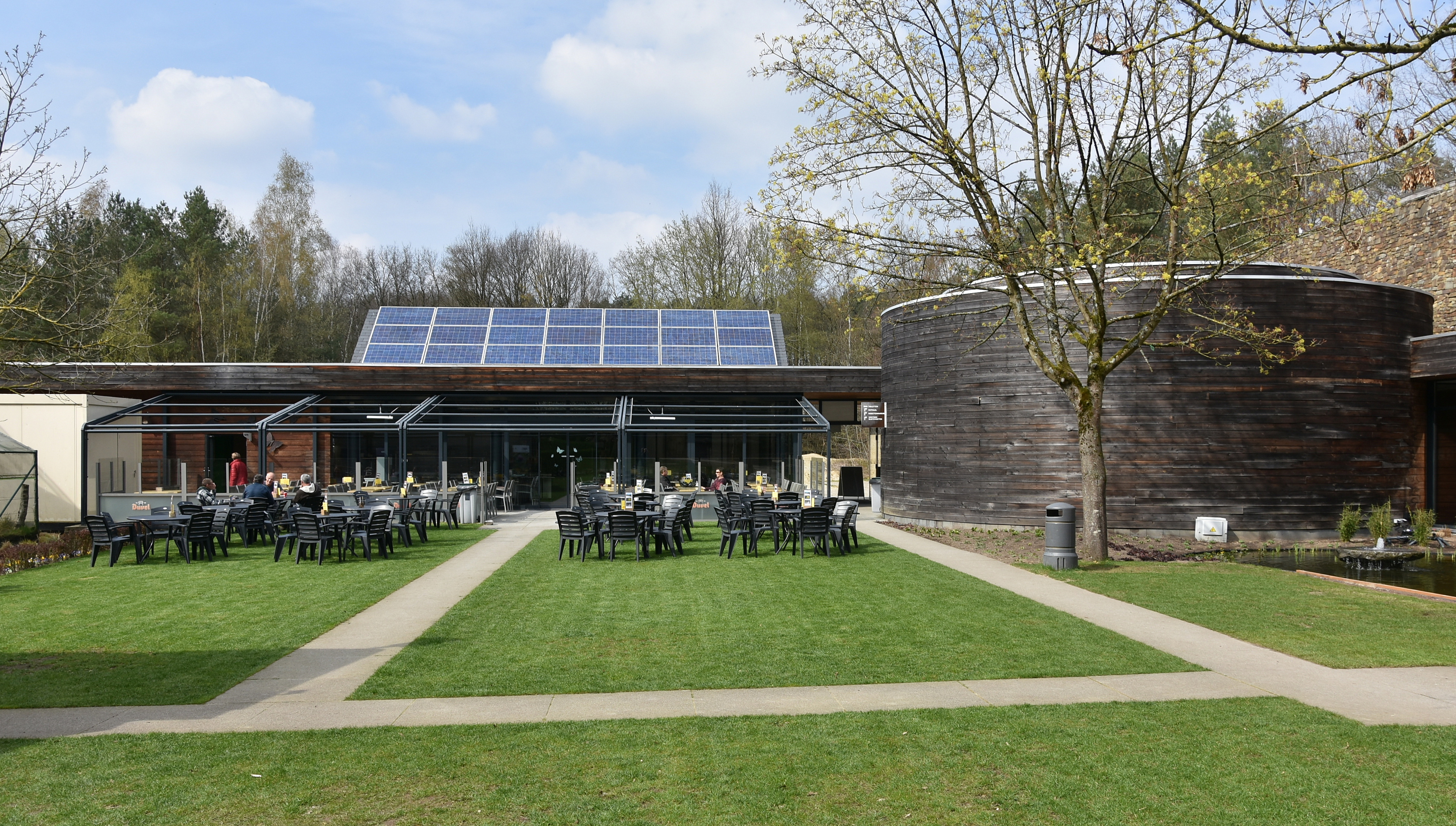
Lieteberg park centre

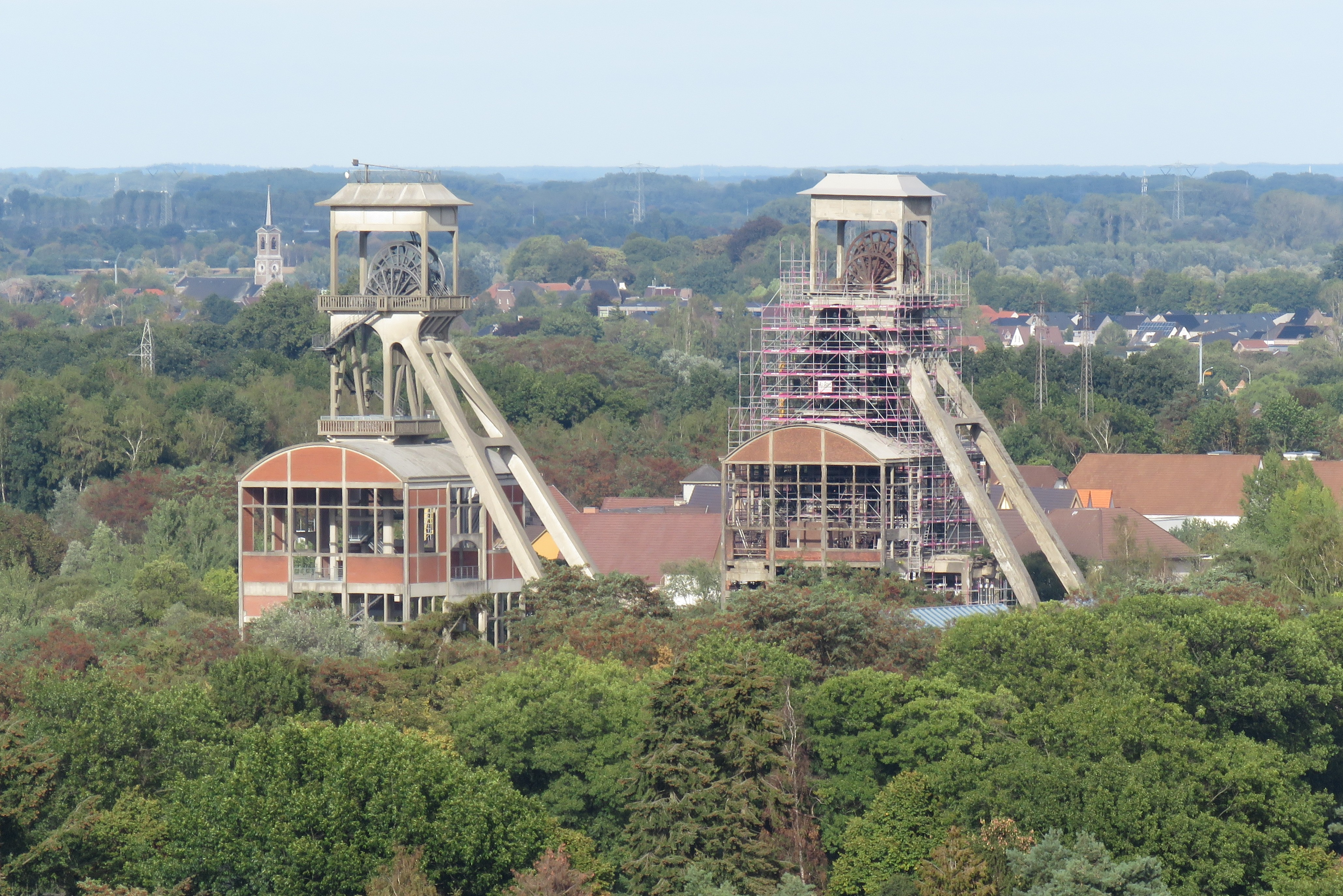
Abandoned mineshafts (2018)

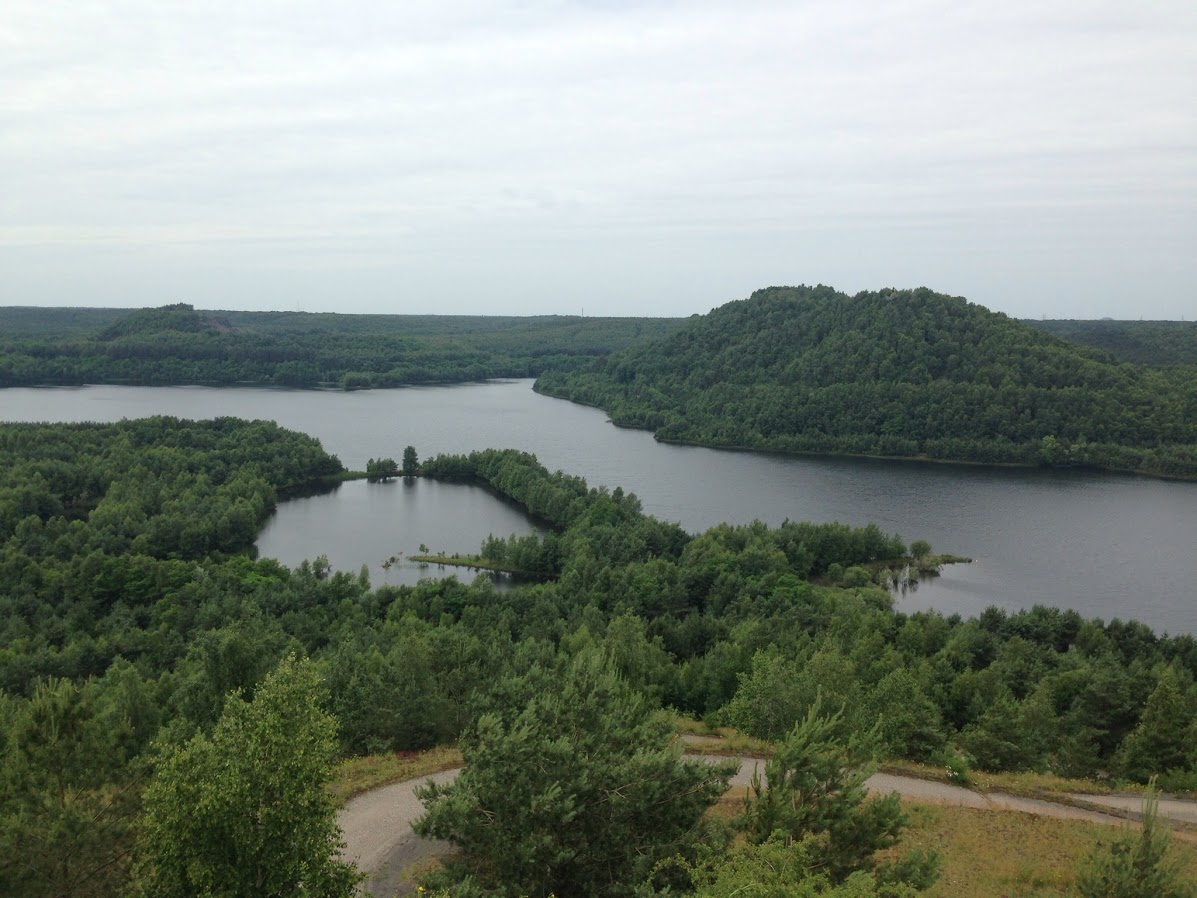
Lakes and forests (2013)

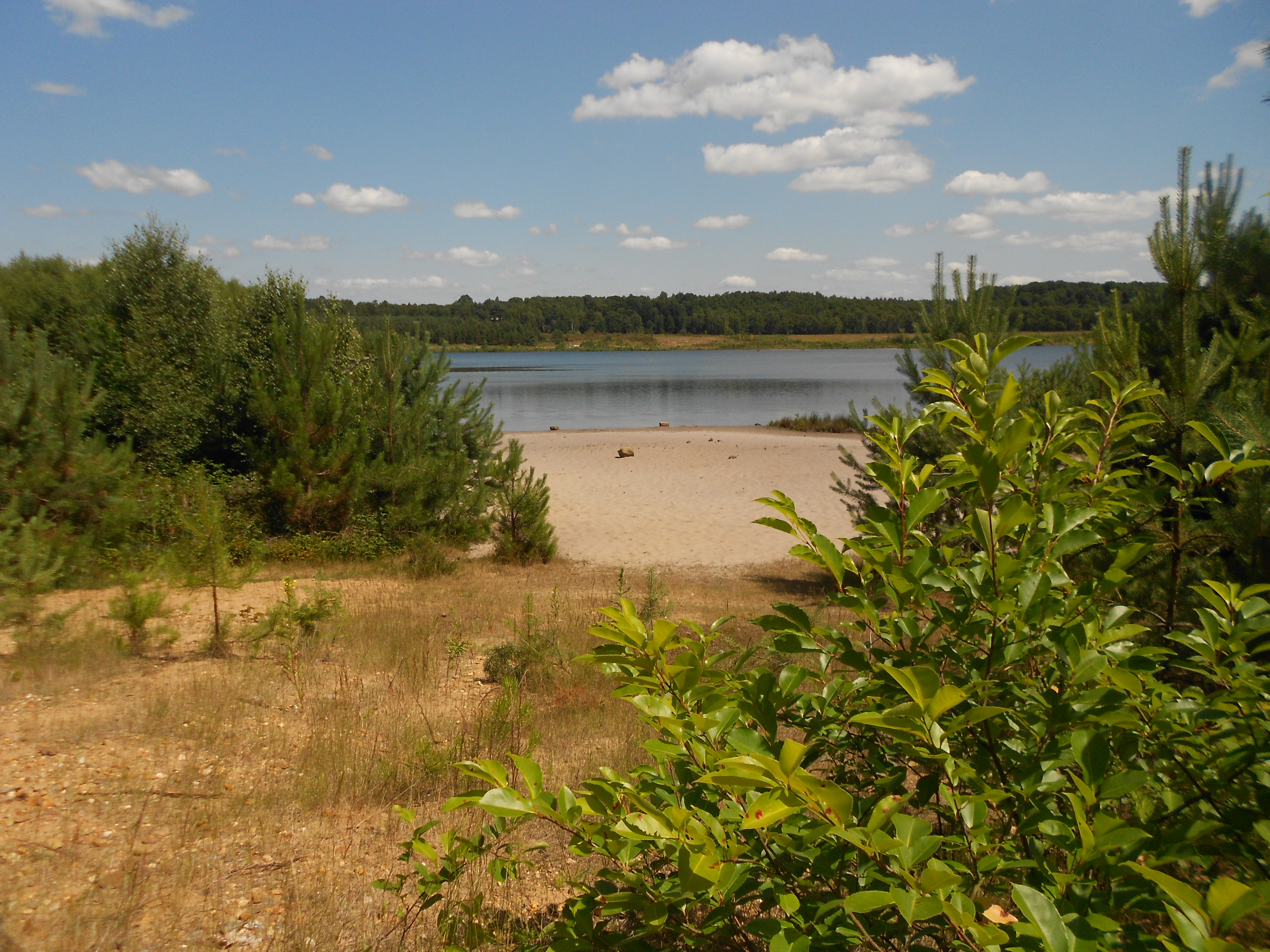

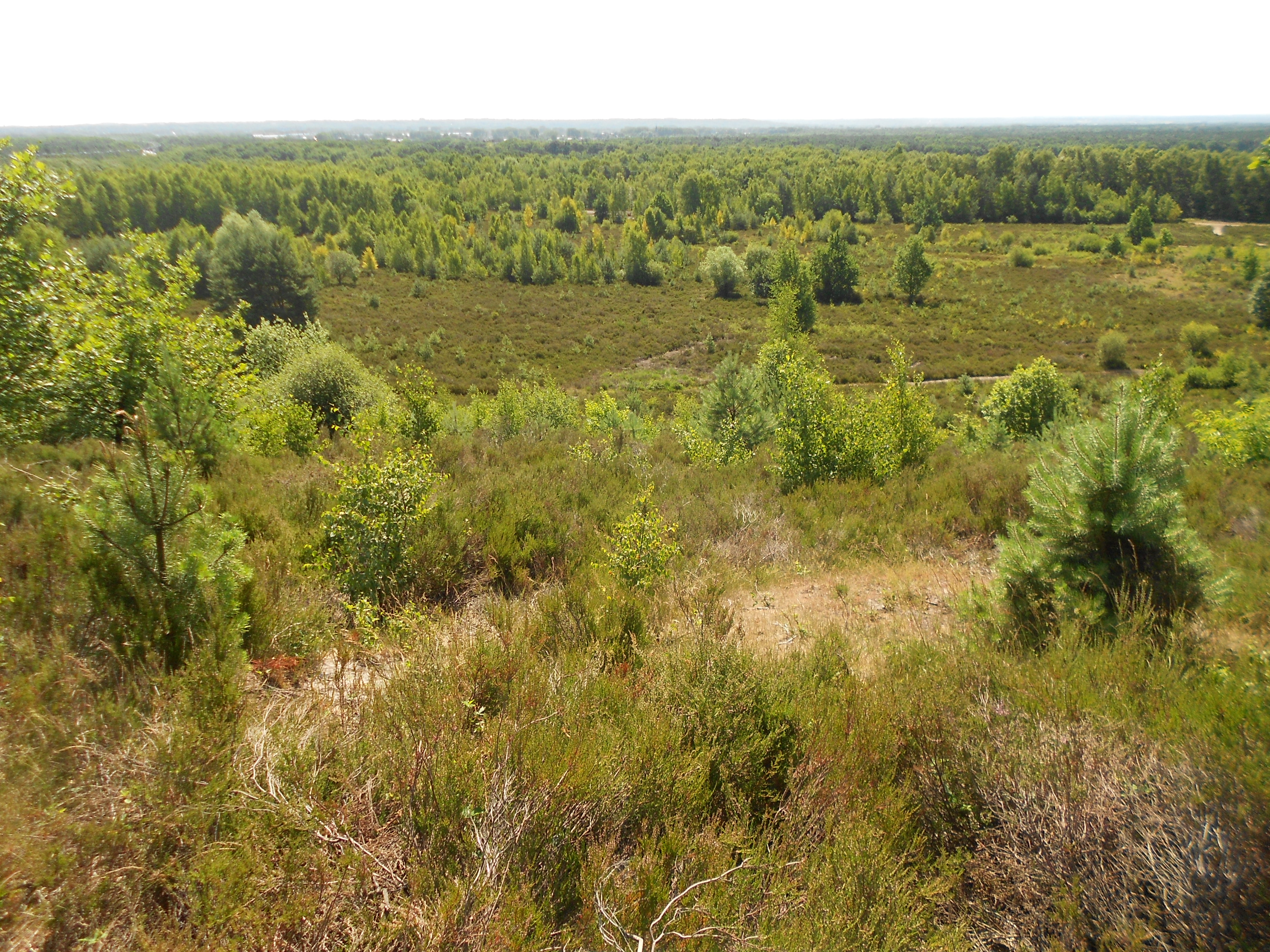
Trees encroaching the heath

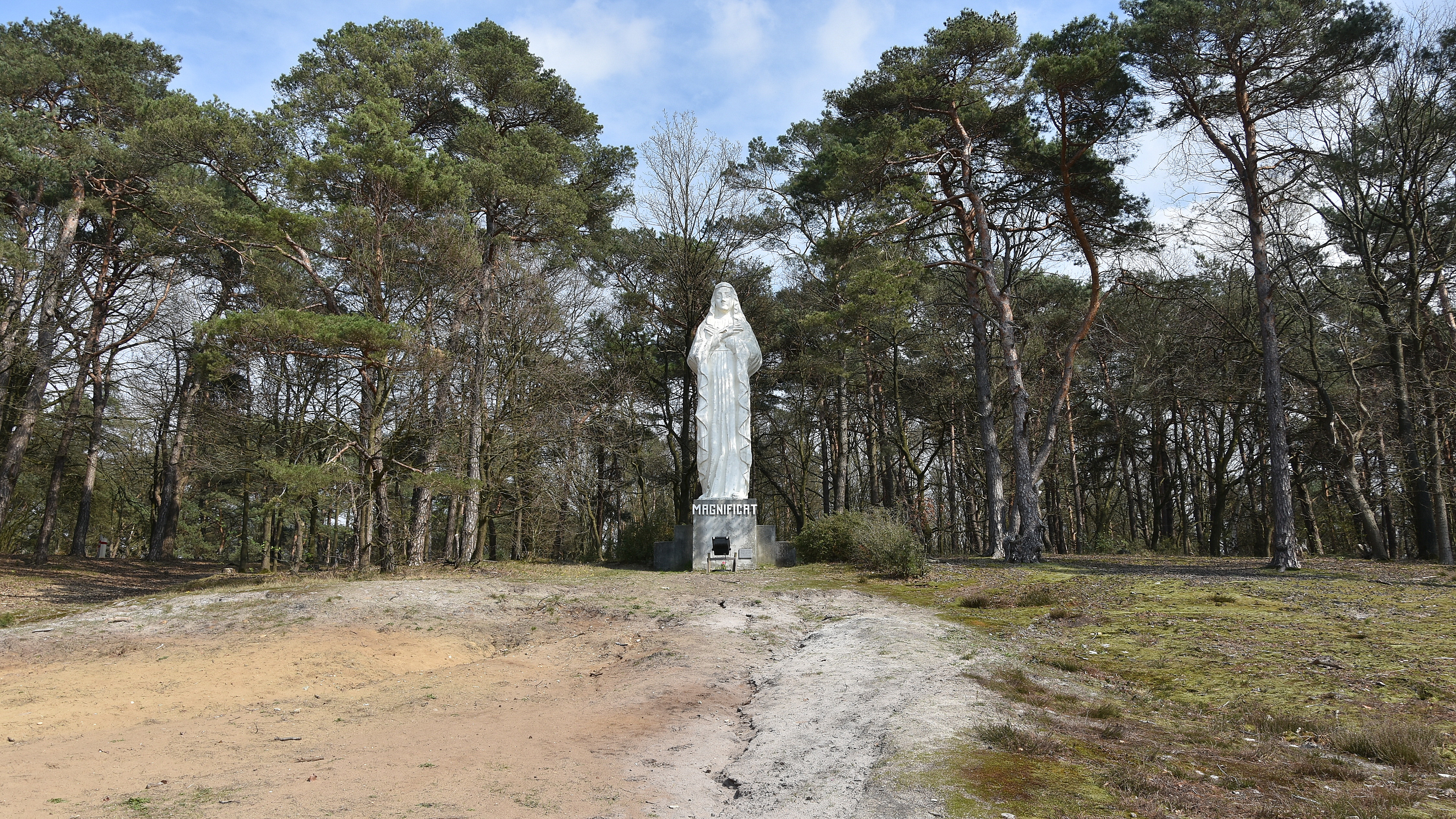
Statue

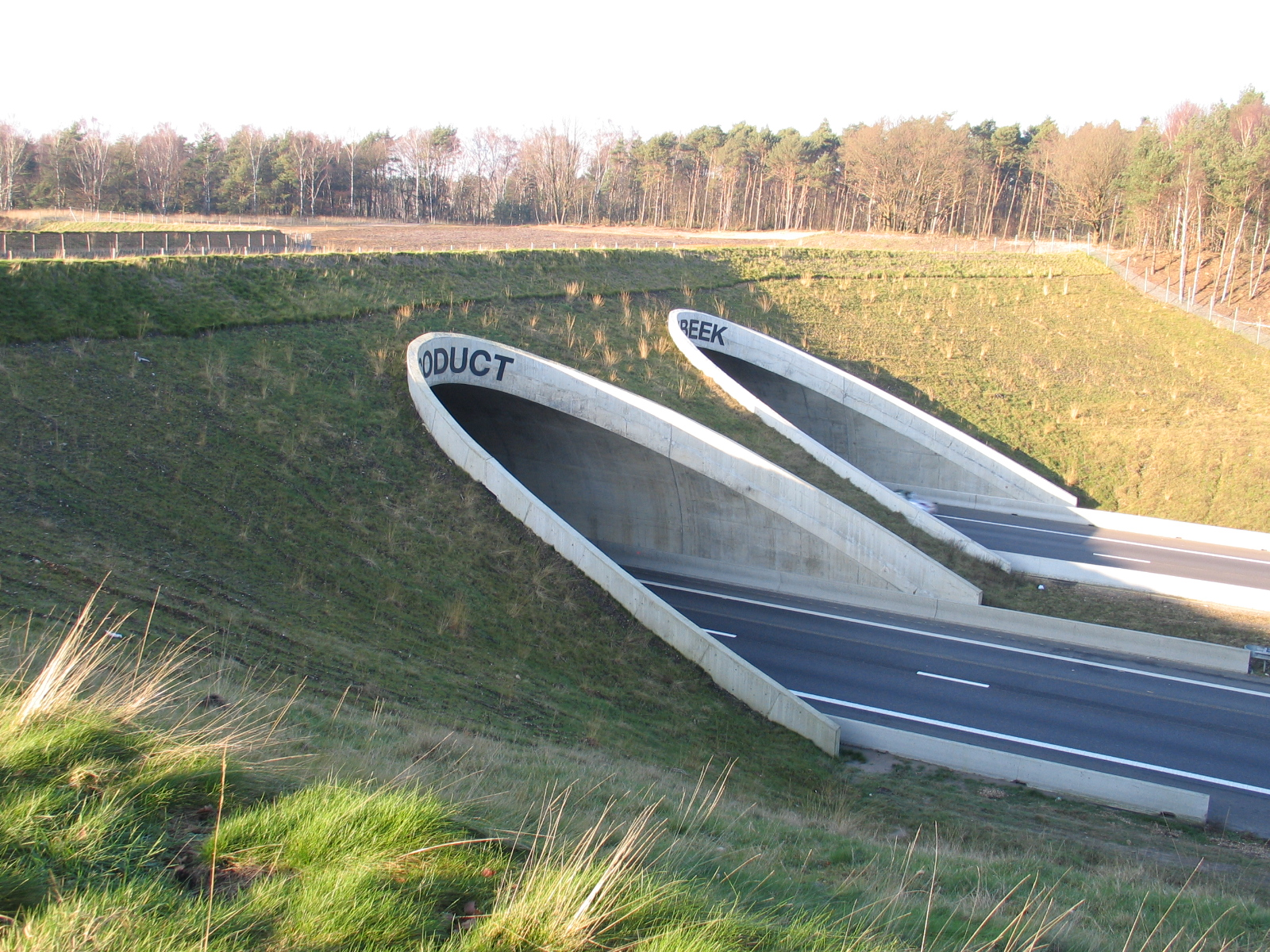
Ecoduct Kikbeek

== See also ==
- Kempen also known as De Kempen, a region in Belgium and the Netherlands, also called Kempenland or Campine.
