= Lanaken =

- Municipality
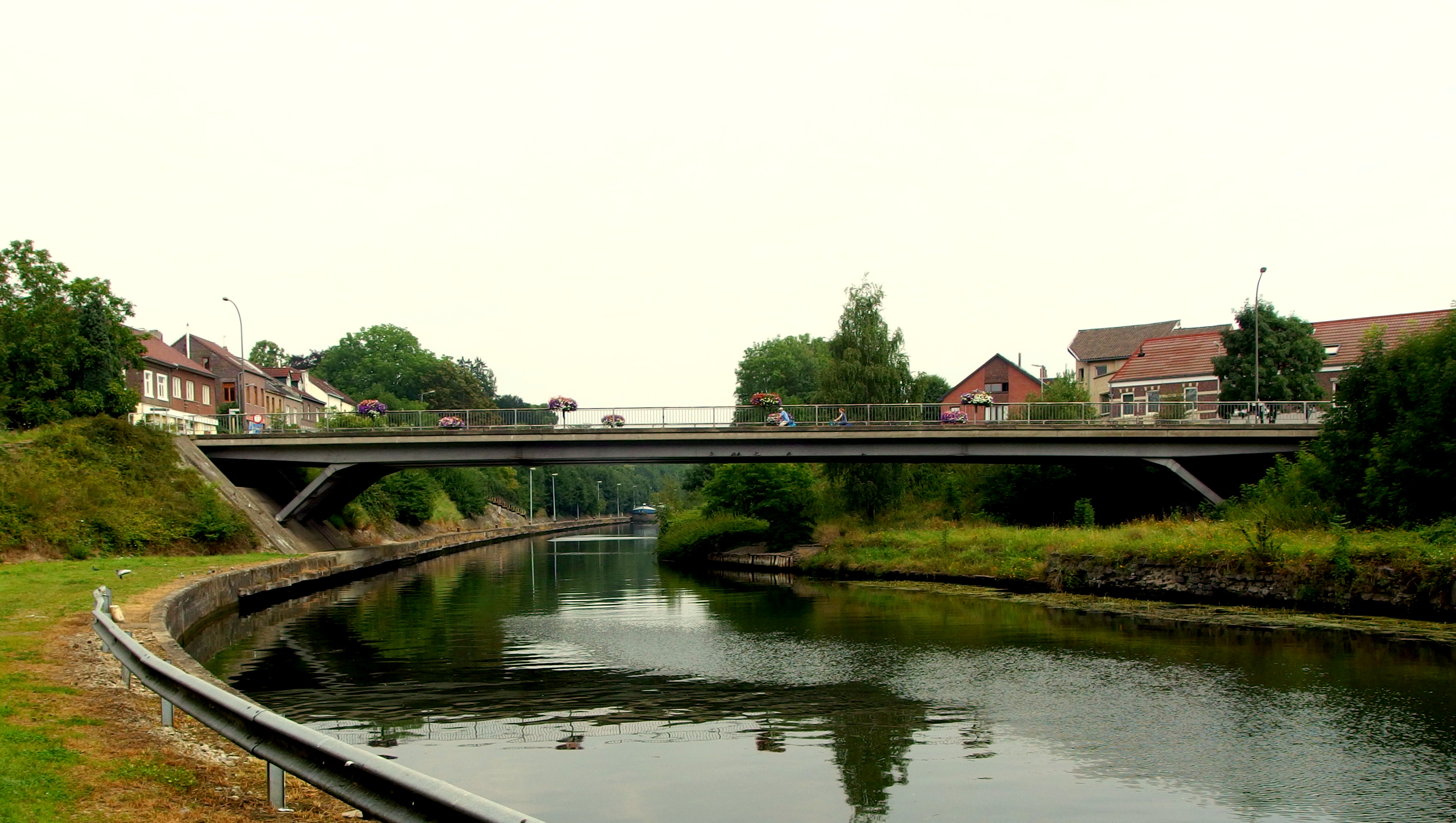
- Zuid-Willemsvaart at Smeermaas

- Flag Coat of arms

- Location of Lanaken in Limburg
- Interactive map of Lanaken
- Location in Belgium
- Coordinates: 50°53′N 05°39′E
- Country: Belgium
- Community: Flemish Community
- Region: Flemish Region
- Province: Limburg
- Arrondissement: Tongeren

Government
  - Mayor: Marino Keulen (Open Vld)
  - Governing parties: Open Vld, Vooruit-Groen

Area
  - Total: 58.95 km^{2} (22.76 sq mi)

Population (2018-01-01)
  - Total: 25,818
  - Density: 438.0/km^{2} (1,134/sq mi)
- Postal codes: 3620-3621
- NIS code: 73042
- Area codes: 089
- Website: www.lanaken.be

Lanaken (Dutch pronunciation: [laːˈnaːkə(n)]; Limburgish: Laoneke) is a municipality located in the Belgian province of Limburg. On January 1, 2007, the municipality of Lanaken had a total population of 24,724. Its area is 59.00 km^{2} which gives a population density of 415 inhabitants per km^{2}.

Lanaken is located on the Belgian-Dutch border, bordering Maastricht directly. In the 2006 census, some 20 percent of the inhabitants turned out to have the Dutch nationality. A number of neighbourhoods in Lanaken is characterized by these immigrants' numerous villas and exclusive landhouses.

Lanaken consists of the following villages: Lanaken proper, Rekem, Neerharen, Gellik, Veldwezelt, Smeermaas and Kesselt. Also located in Lanaken are the hamlets Briegden and Herbricht and the old village centre Oud-Rekem.

The Veldwezelt-Hezerwater Palaeolithic archaeological site is located in the municipality.

== History ==
Archaeological finds on the territory of Lanaken are known from the Neolithic, Roman and Merovingian periods. There were several Gallo-Roman cemeteries and in Smeermaas was the Gallo-Roman villa of Smeermaas was located.

In the Middle Ages, the domain of Lanaken probably belonged to the emperor of the Holy Roman Empire. From the 12th century Lanaken was part of the seigniory of Pietersheim of Loon, whose lords founded the Abbey of Hocht around 1186. In 1106 the patronage right of the parish church was given to the Maastricht chapter of St. Servaas.

In 1808 the present borough was formed, merging Lanaken with Smeermaas, Hocht, Pietersem, Ca(u)berg, Bessemer and Briegden. In 1839, as a result of the Belgian revolution and subsequent Treaty of London, the municipality was split into a Belgian and a Dutch part (Caberg). Caberg then became an independent parish. Smeermaas received its own church in 1870. The borough of Bessemer was later incorporated into the municipality of Zutendaal.

From 1824-1829 the South Willemsvaart was built, and from 1930-1934 the Briegden-Neerharen canal. These canals cut through the territory of Lanaken. In 1856 followed the Hasselt-Maastricht railroad line, which was closed to passenger traffic in 1954.

On October 4, 1914, during World War I, the center of Lanaken was set on fire by the Germans, partly in retaliation for the resistance of a Belgian volunteer group led by Mayor Edgard de Caritat de Peruzzis. The castles of de Caritat de Peruzzis and Alicebourg were then blown up.

On May 10, 1940, during World War II, German planes bombed the barracks of de Caritat de Peruzzis killing Captain-Commander Henri Giddelo and five other soldiers.

In 1957, the Saint Barbara Hospital in Lanaken was established by the Limburg mines to enable research and combat occupational diseases, especially dust lung, which mostly affected the miners of the Kempen coal basin.

On January 1, 1977, Lanaken merged with the surrounding municipalities of Gellik, Neerharen, Rekem and Veldwezelt to form the present municipality of Lanaken.

== Etymology ==
Lanaken was mentioned in 810 as Ludinaca and in 1106 as Lodenaken. This contains the personal name Hlodo or Ludo followed by the word haka, meaning sand plate.

== Nature and landscape ==
Lanaken is characterized by being located on the southern edge of the Kempen Plateau, separated from the more southern region of Haspengouw by the Albert Canal. To the southeast, Lanaken is cut off from Smeermaas and the Maas basin by the Briegden-Neerharen Canal. Lanaken itself lies at an altitude of about 60 meters, to the northwest one finds steep edges to the plateau, which reaches heights of up to 100 meters, and the deeply cut valleys of the brooks Asbeek and Ziepbeek. This part, which is part of the Hoge Kempen National Park, has marshy lowlands, heaths, and forests, consisting of coniferous forest, once planted for the production of mining wood, and mixed forest. The most famous areas are Pietersembos and Asbroek.

Marked walks through this area start both at Pietersheim Castle and at the parking lot near the Saint-Barbara Hospital.

== Economy ==
Lanaken grew as a result of the presence of railroad and canals, there was commuter traffic to Maastricht, and jobs were created at the Eisden coal mine. Also established were a paper factory (today: Sappi), a rubber factory (today: Hercorub) and a factory for synthetic fibers (Celanese), among others.

In 2006, four 100 meter high wind turbines were built to provide electricity to the Celanese factory. Later on 8 more have been built.

The South African pulp and paper company Sappi operates a large mill on the outskirts of the town and is an important source of employment for the town's residents. In October 2023, Sappi announced the closure of their facility in Lanaken.

Lanaken is part of the Albert Canal Economic Network together with 24 other municipalities through which the canal runs.

== Transportation ==
The reactivation of the former railway Maastricht-Lanaken-Hasselt as a light rail known as the Hasselt – Maastricht tramway as part of the Belgian Spartacus plan was scheduled for 2014. It was later postponed to 2025, to be later canceled in June 2022 and in favour of an electric "trambus" which will start operations in 2024.

== Born in Lanaken ==
- Eric Gerets (1954) Former professional football (soccer) player for Belgium, born in Rekem
- Edgar Willems (1890–1978), artist, musician, and music educator

== Gallery ==
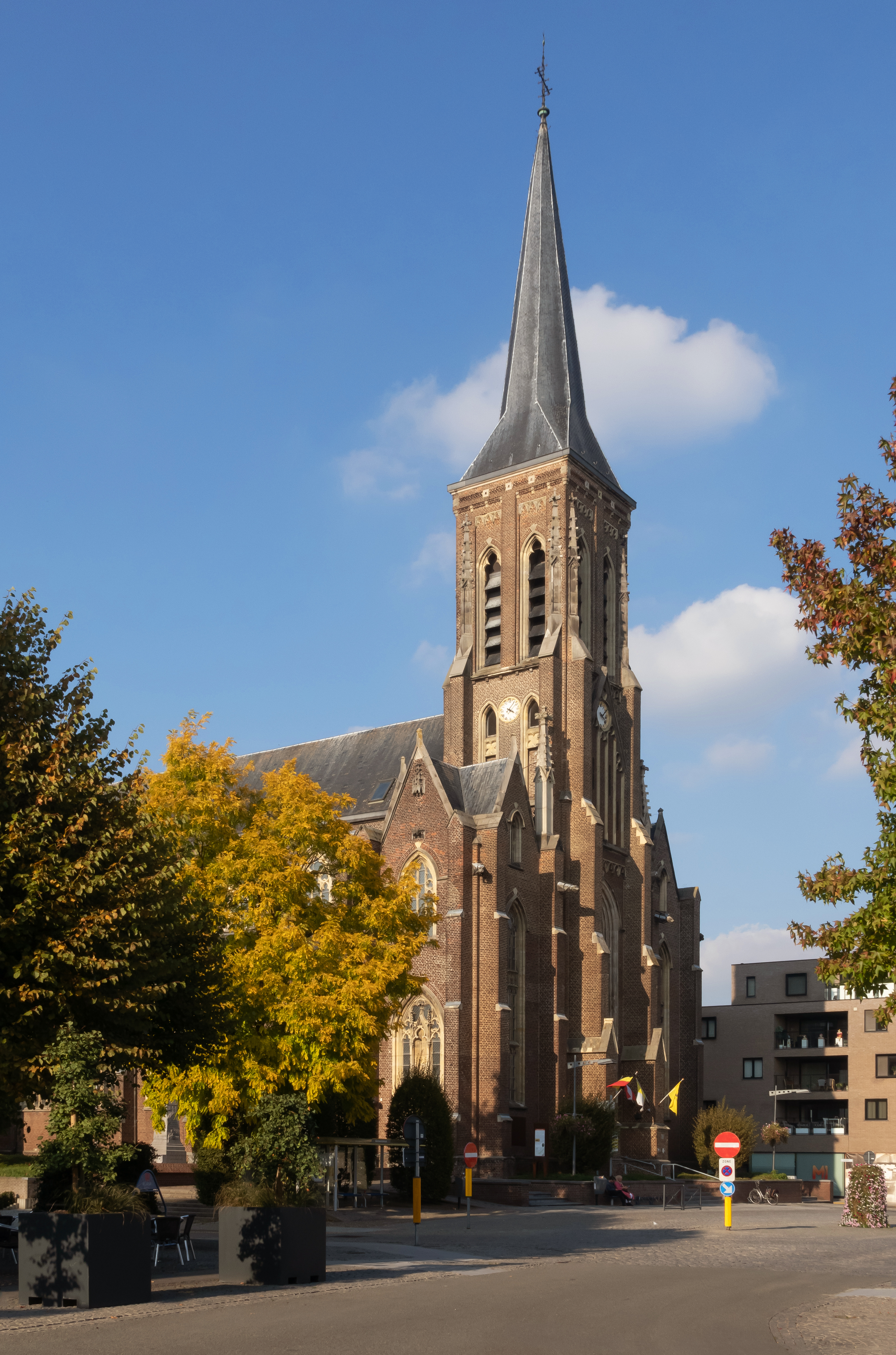
Sint-Ursula church

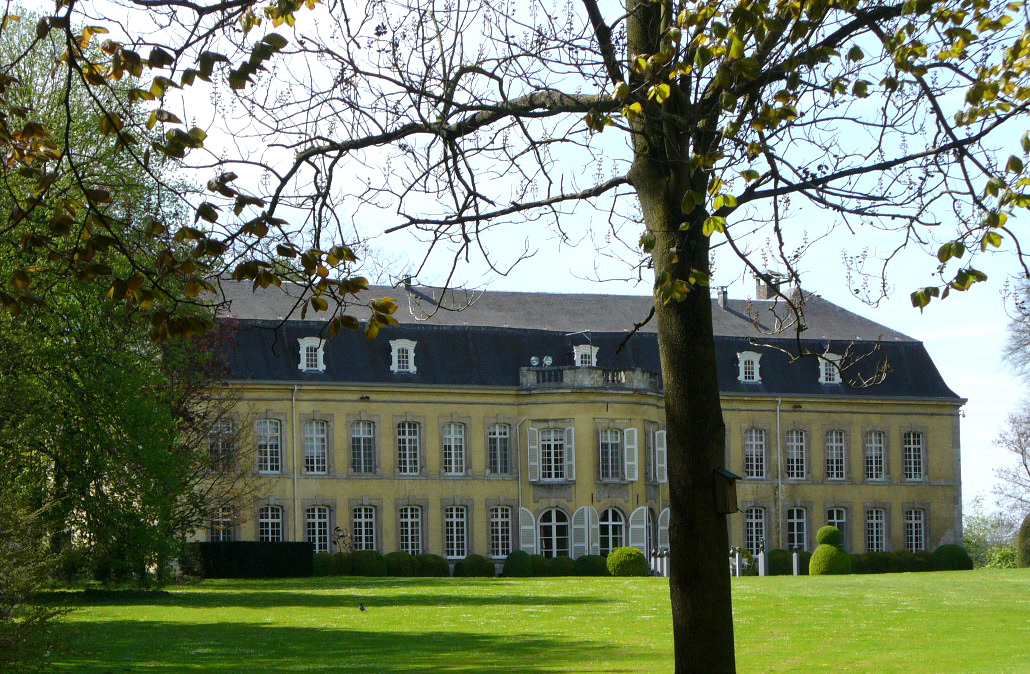
Hocht Abbey at Lanaken

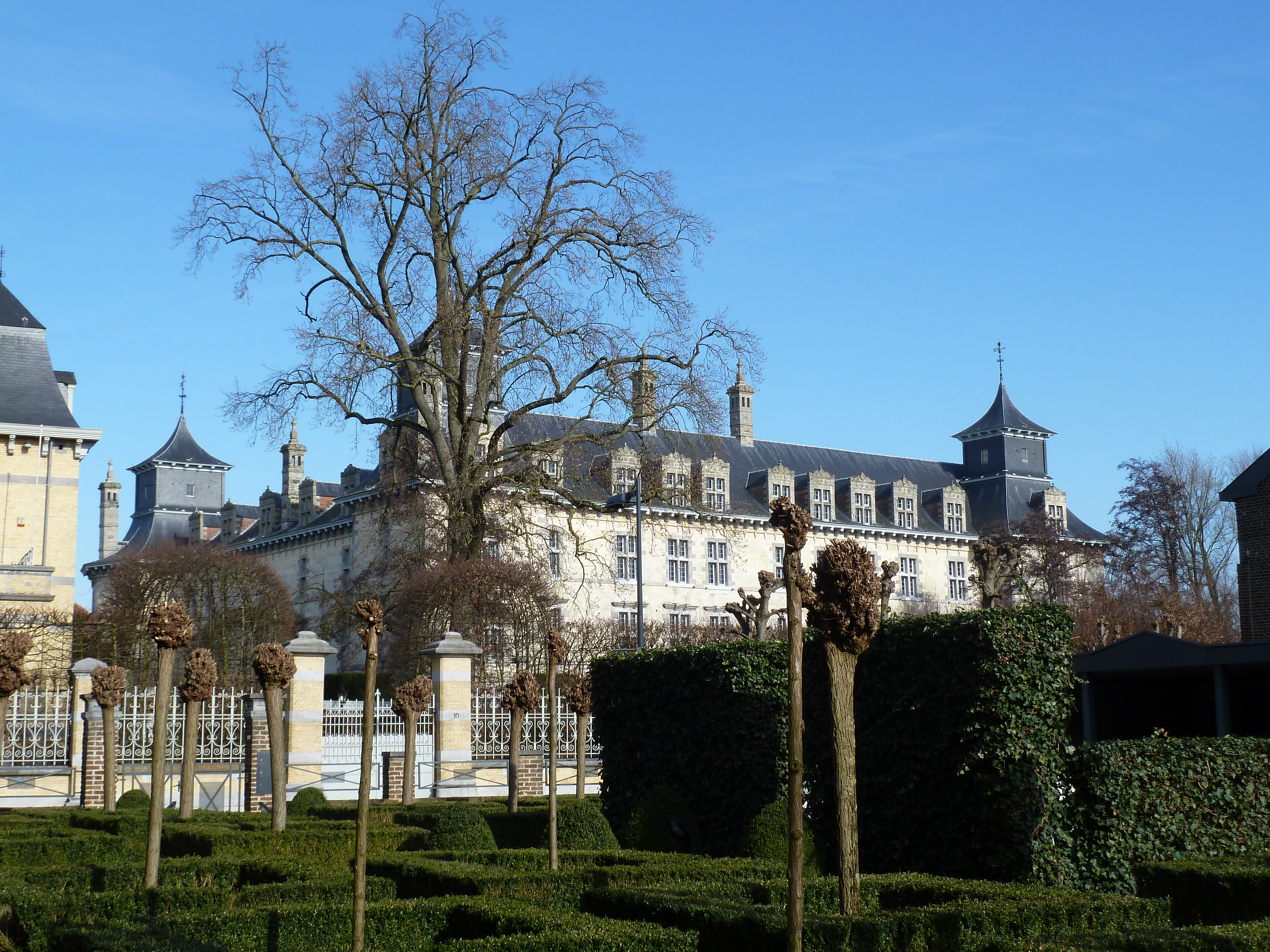
d'Aspremont-Lynden castle at Rekem
