= Veldwezelt-Hezerwater =

Archaeological site in Lanaken, Belgium

Coordinates: 50.856°N 5.641°E

Veldwezelt-Hezerwater is a Palaeolithic archaeological site in the municipality of Lanaken in the province of Limburg, Belgium.

== See also ==
- Archaeology
- Stone Age
