= Iain Scobbie =

British scholar of international law

Iain Girvan Mann Scobbie is a British scholar of international law who is the Chair of International Law at the University of Manchester, where he lectures on public international law, international courts and tribunals, and the use of force. He was previously the Sir Joseph Hotung Research Professor in Law, Human Rights and Peace Building in the Middle East at the School of Oriental and African Studies at the University of London, where he remains affiliated.

== Early life and education ==
Scobbie studied from 1977 to 1981 at the University of Edinburgh, earning an LLB (Hons). In 1981–82 he was at the University of Cambridge, where he earned an LLB in international law. In 1982–83 he studied at the Australian National University, receiving a GDIL. He was again at Cambridge from 1983 to 1987, where he received a Ph.D. in international law.

His doctoral dissertation "examined legal reasoning and the judicial function in the International Court."

== Bibliography ==
Scobbie is one of the editors of International Law and the Israeli-Palestinian Conflict: A Rights-Based Approach to Middle East Peace, along with Susan M. Akram, Michael Dumper, and Michael Lynk. The book was published by Routledge in 2010. He is the author of Legal Reasoning and the Judicial Function in the International Court.
