= Zutendaal =

- Municipality
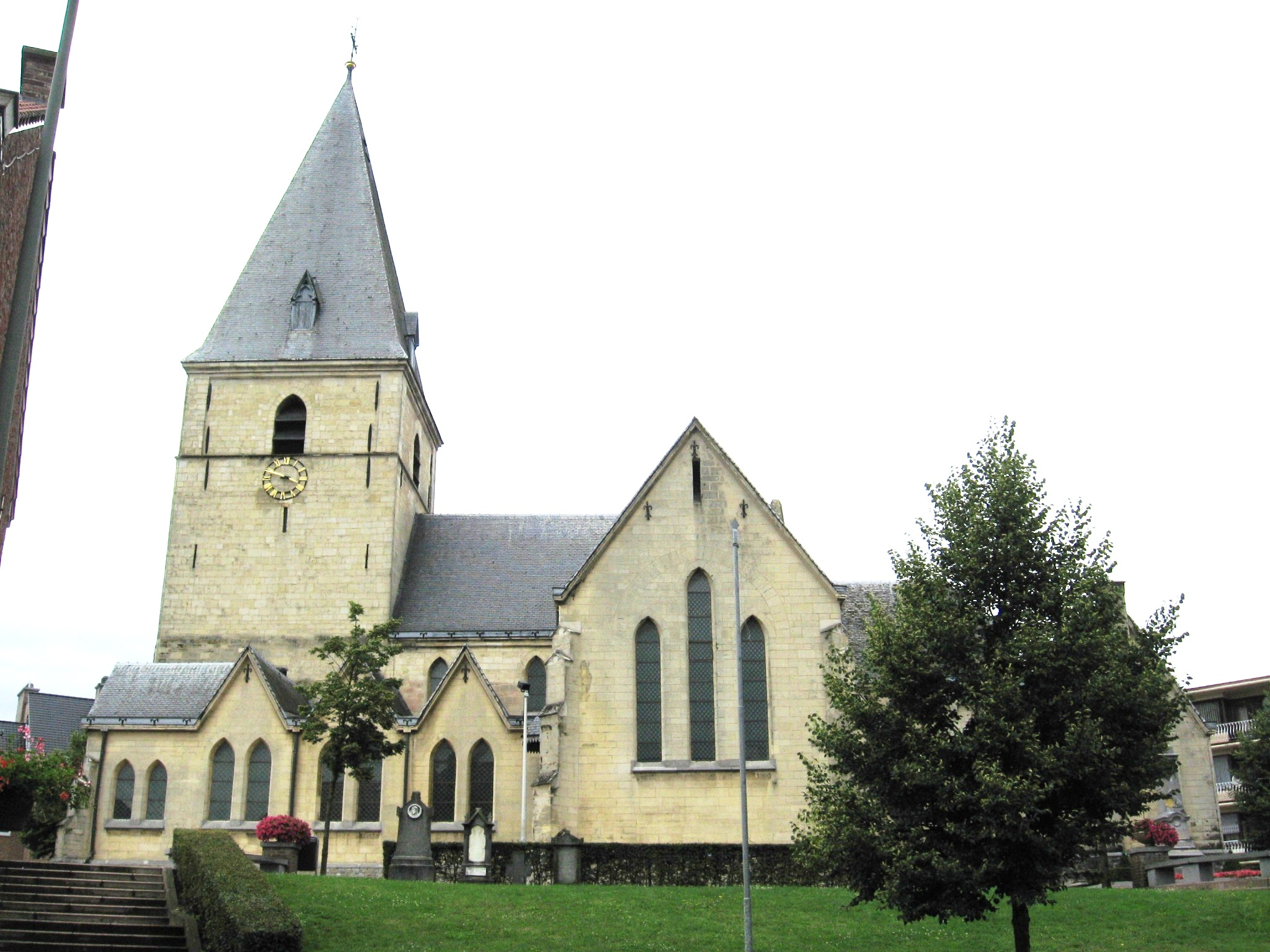

- Flag Coat of arms

- Location of Zutendaal in Limburg
- Interactive map of Zutendaal
- Location in Belgium
- Coordinates: 50°56′N 05°34′E
- Country: Belgium
- Community: Flemish Community
- Region: Flemish Region
- Province: Limburg
- Arrondissement: Hasselt

Government
  - Mayor: Ann Schrijvers (ZVP)
  - Governing party: ZVP

Area
  - Total: 32.11 km^{2} (12.40 sq mi)

Population (2018-01-01)
  - Total: 7,234
  - Density: 225.3/km^{2} (583.5/sq mi)
- Postal codes: 3690
- NIS code: 71067
- Area codes: 089
- Website: www.zutendaal.be

Zutendaal (Dutch pronunciation: [ˈzytə(n)ˌdaːl]; Limburgish: Zietendaol; in English sometimes also referred to as "Sweet Valley") is a municipality located in the Belgian province of Limburg. On 1 January 2017 Zutendaal had a total population of 7,269. The total area is 32.07 km^{2}, giving a population density of 227 inhabitants per km^{2}.

In addition to Zutendaal itself, the municipality includes the following population centres: Gewaai, Papendaal, Besmer, Broek, Stalken, Roelen, Daal, and Wiemesmeer.

== Etymology ==
The first written mention of Zutendaal was in 1292 under the name of Suerbroeck, indicating that the land around the village was acidic and swampy. From 1345 the name changed to Zuetendael which literally translates to "Sweet Valley". Indicating there were a lot of freshwater sources around the village.

== History ==
While the oldest settlements such as Papendaal, Zutendaal, Broek, Stalken and Roelen arose at the respective creek springs, Wiemesmeer, Gewaai and Besmer were founded much later, on the Kempen plateau. The Borough of Besmer was transferred from Lanaken to Zutendaal in the 19th century.

The first church is said to have been founded as early as the 7th century from the Abbey of Munsterbilzen. In 1304, the patronage right was transferred by Count Arnold V of Loon to the Abbey of Averbode. South of the church, around the town square the Vijverplein, some remnants of the former village center remain.

During the 16th and 17th centuries, there were many problems with itinerant army bands. In 1598, the church of Zutendaal was set on fire and also later the population had to resort to entrenchments to get to safety from these army bands. In 1790, a battle took place on the hill the Hesselsberg between the Liège revolutionaries and the troops of the Elector of Pfaltz, who supported the Prince-Bishop of Liège.

At the end of the 19th and beginning of the 20th century, the heath was afforested for the production of mining wood. In 1938, on the local road Heiwijkerweg, the FN explosives factory was established. In 1944 the Americans built the Zutendaal Air Base. On January 1, 1945 Operation Bodenplatte raged here, which was lost by the Germans. From 1953 a NATO reserve base established itself at the air base.

== Economy and tourism ==
Today Zutendaal is one of the most densely forested municipalities of Flanders, with tourism being a source of income. The community is famous for its barefoot path at the Lieteberg, one of the gateways to the Hoge Kempen National Park which nearly completely surrounds the municipality. Further economic activity can be found in some sand and gravel quarries.

Zutendaal is part of the Albert Canal Economic Network together with 24 other municipalities through which the canal runs.

== Demographic evolution ==
Historical population

Year	Pop.	±%
1806	?	—
1816	?	—
1830	?	—
1846	928	—
1856	?	—
1866	903	—
1876	?	—

Year	Pop.	±%
1880	940	—
1890	963	+2.4%
1900	956	−0.7%
1910	1,072	+12.1%
1920	1,189	+10.9%
1930	1,505	+26.6%
1947	2,032	+35.0%

Year	Pop.	±%
1961	3,045	+49.9%
1970	4,055	+33.2%
1981	5,193	+28.1%
1990	5,983	+15.2%
2000	6,755	+12.9%
2010	7,009	+3.8%
2017	7,270	+3.7%

Source: NIS, Opm:1806 tot en met 1981=volkstellingen; 1990 en later= inwonertal op 1 januari

== Gallery ==
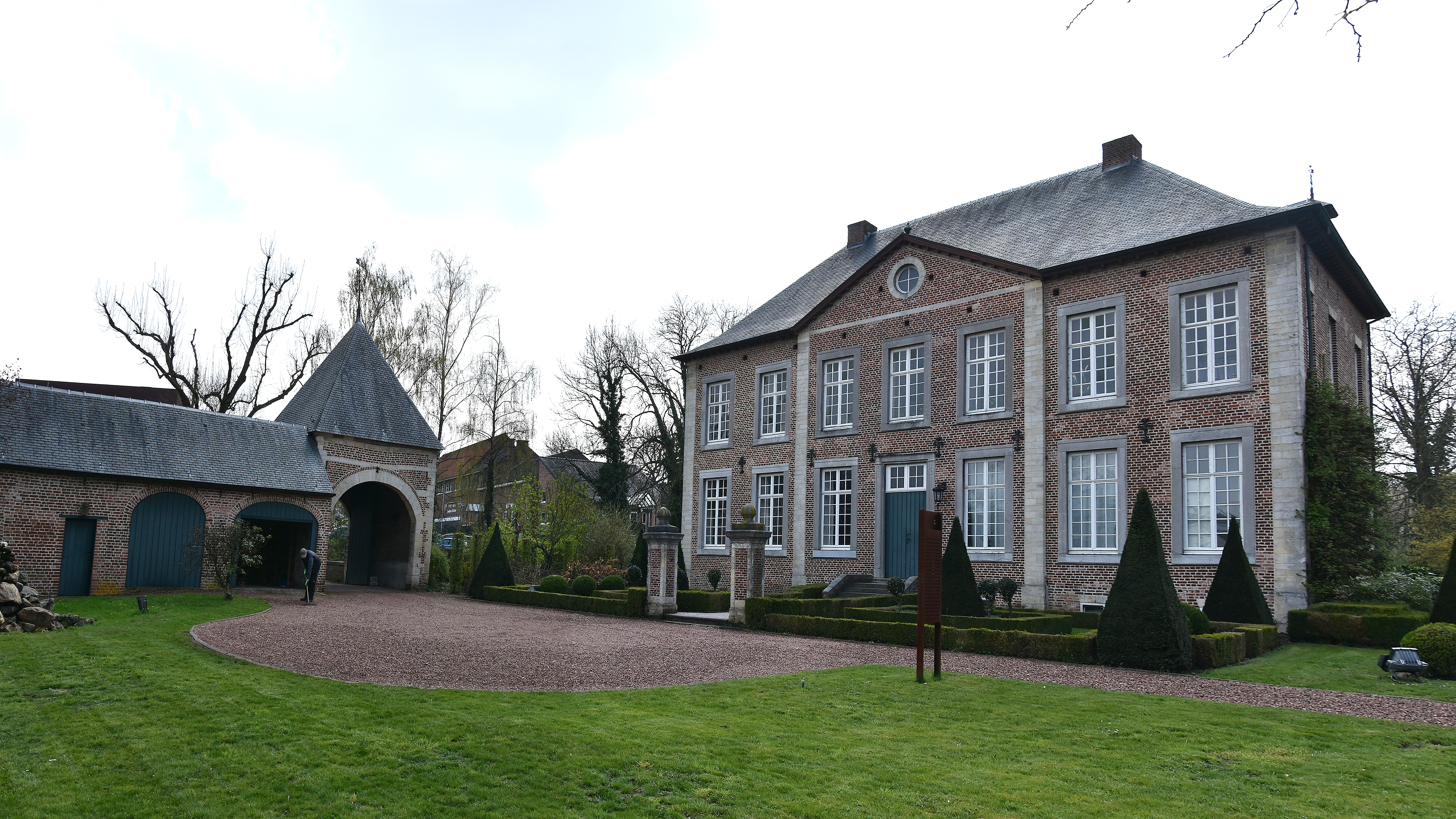
The parsonage of Zutendaal, the Witherenpastorie.

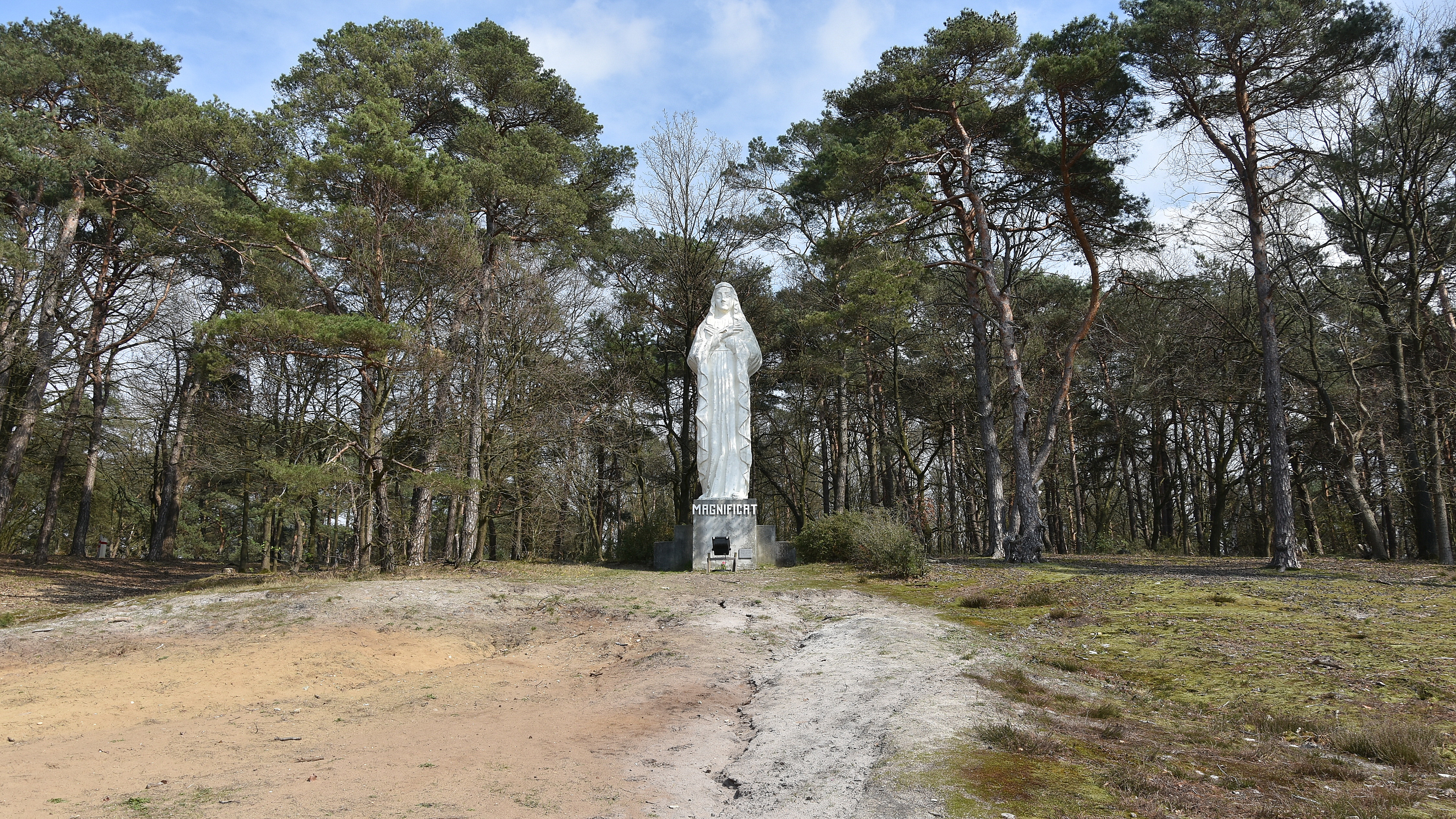
The Maria statue on the Hesselsberg.

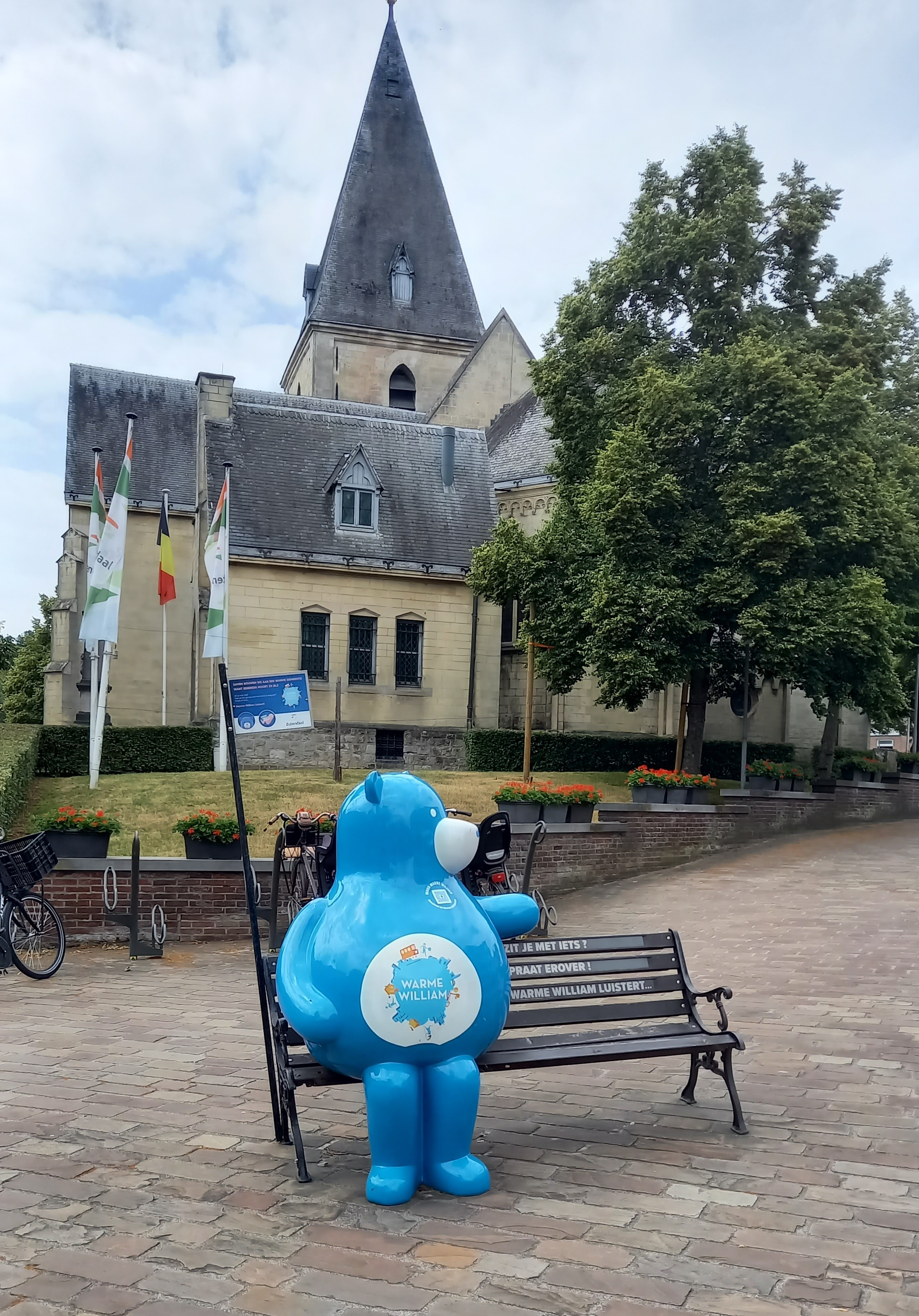
Warm William with the church of Zutendaal in the background.

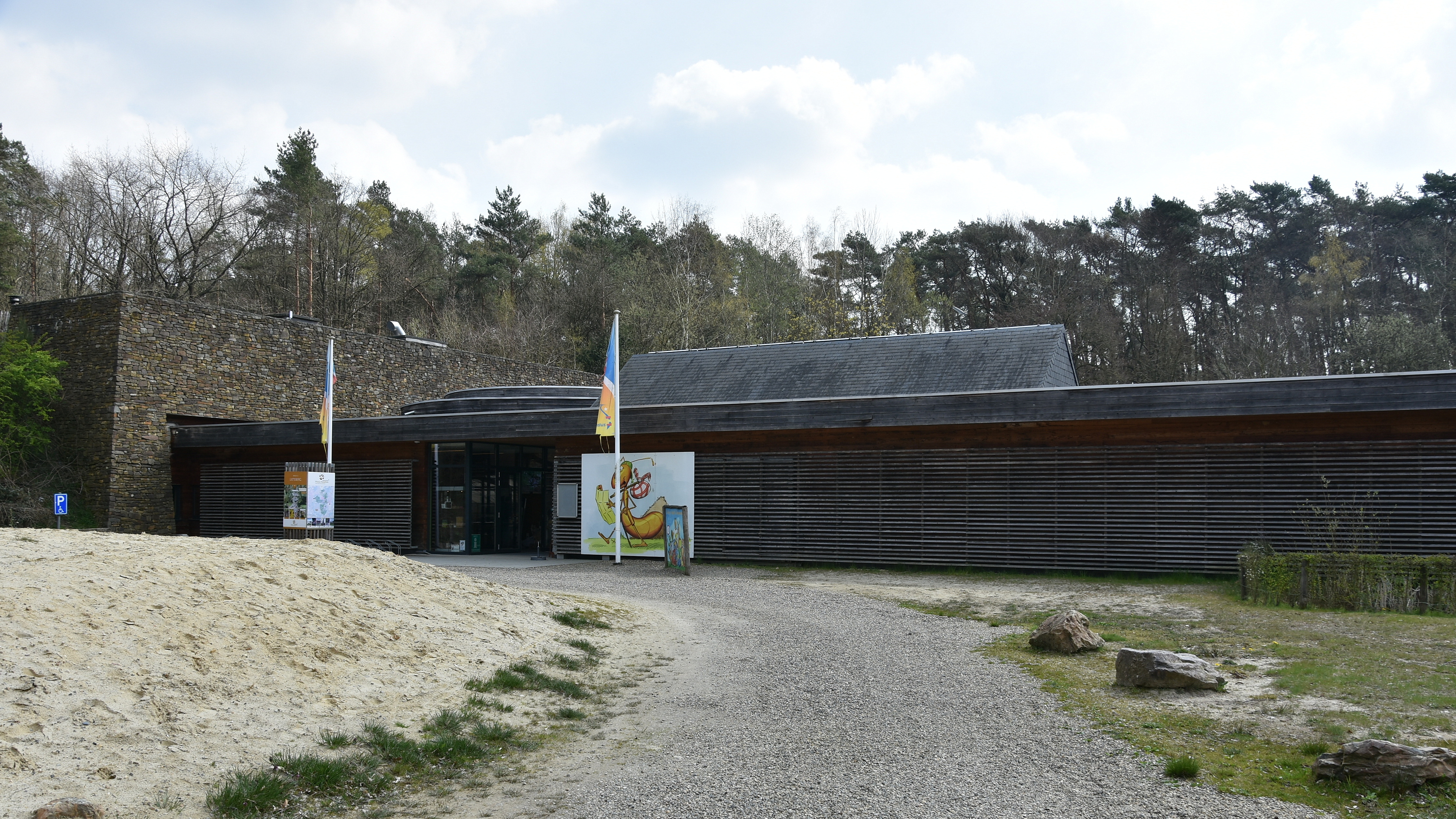
The Lieteberg National Park Hoge Kempen Gateway.

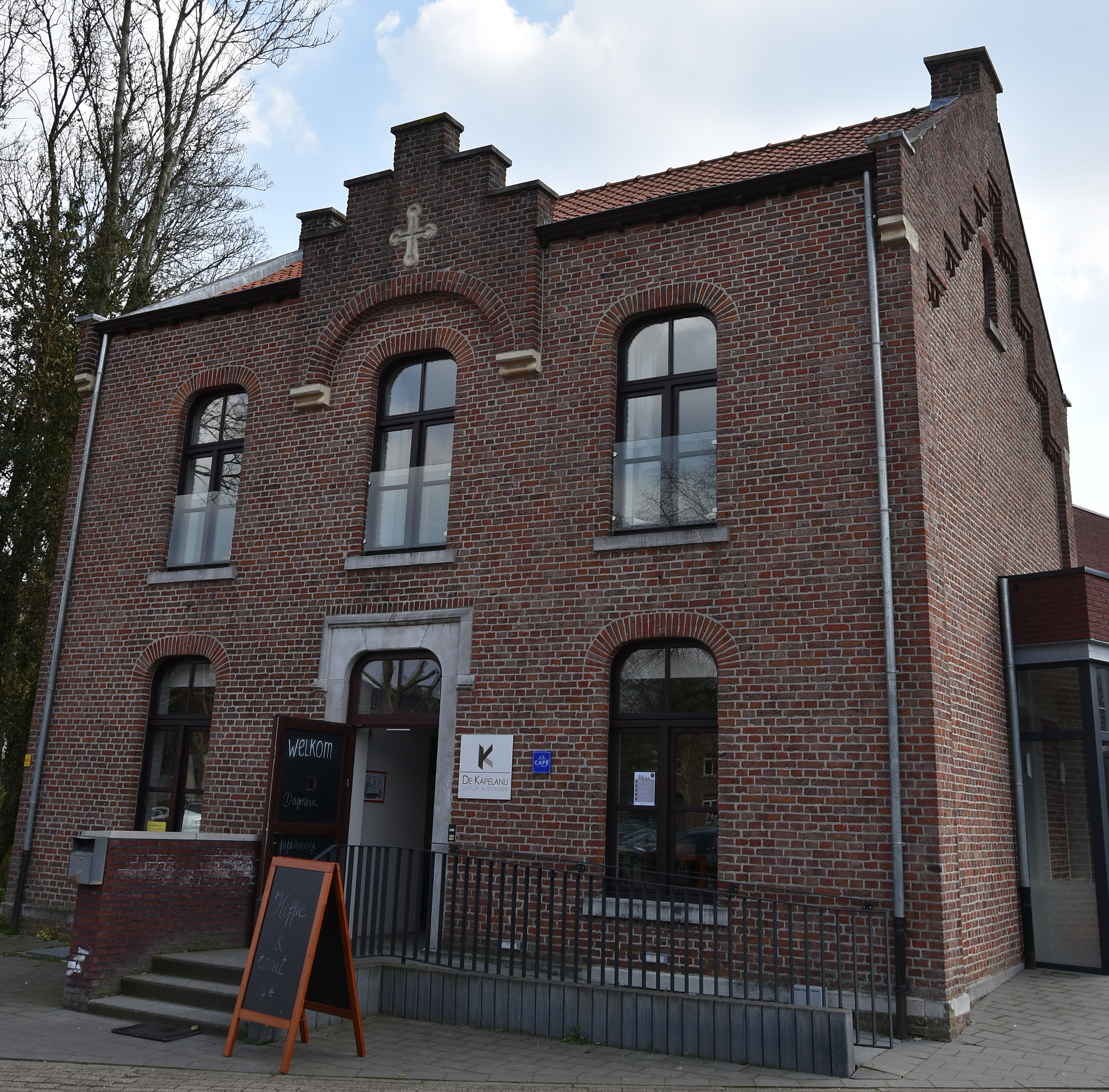
The former chaplaincy of Zutendaal.

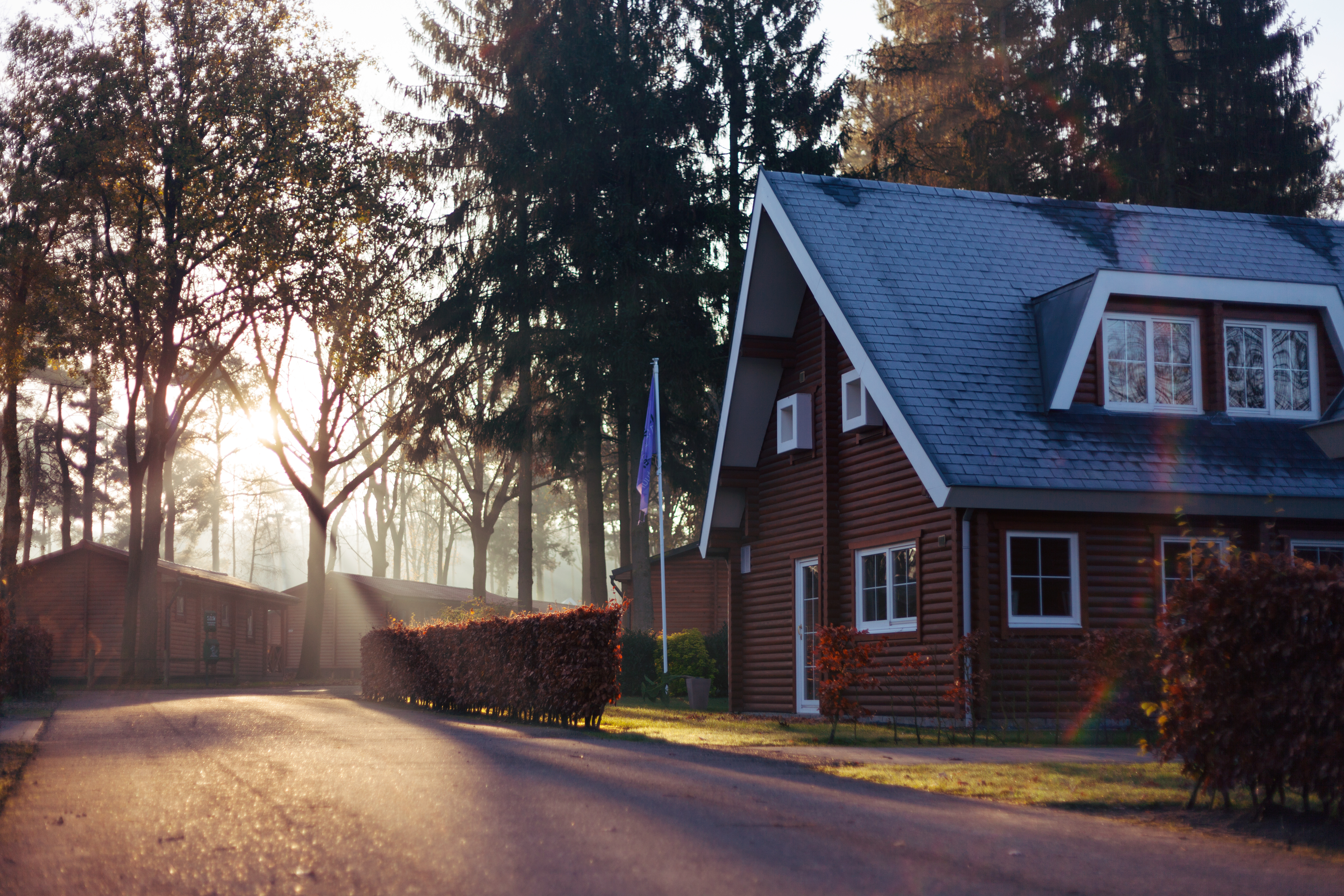
One of the many vacation parks of Zutendaal.

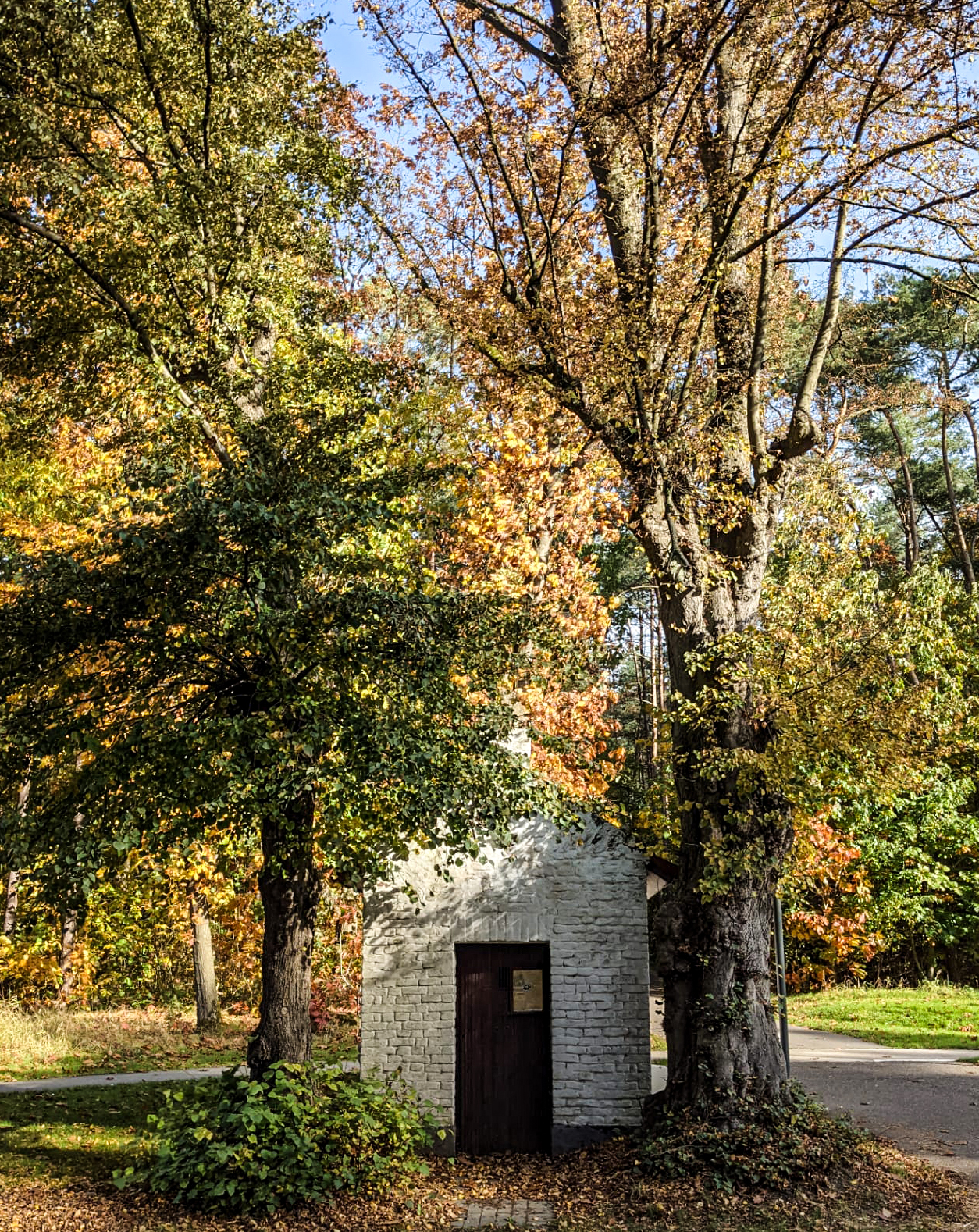
One of the many chapels found in Zutendaal.

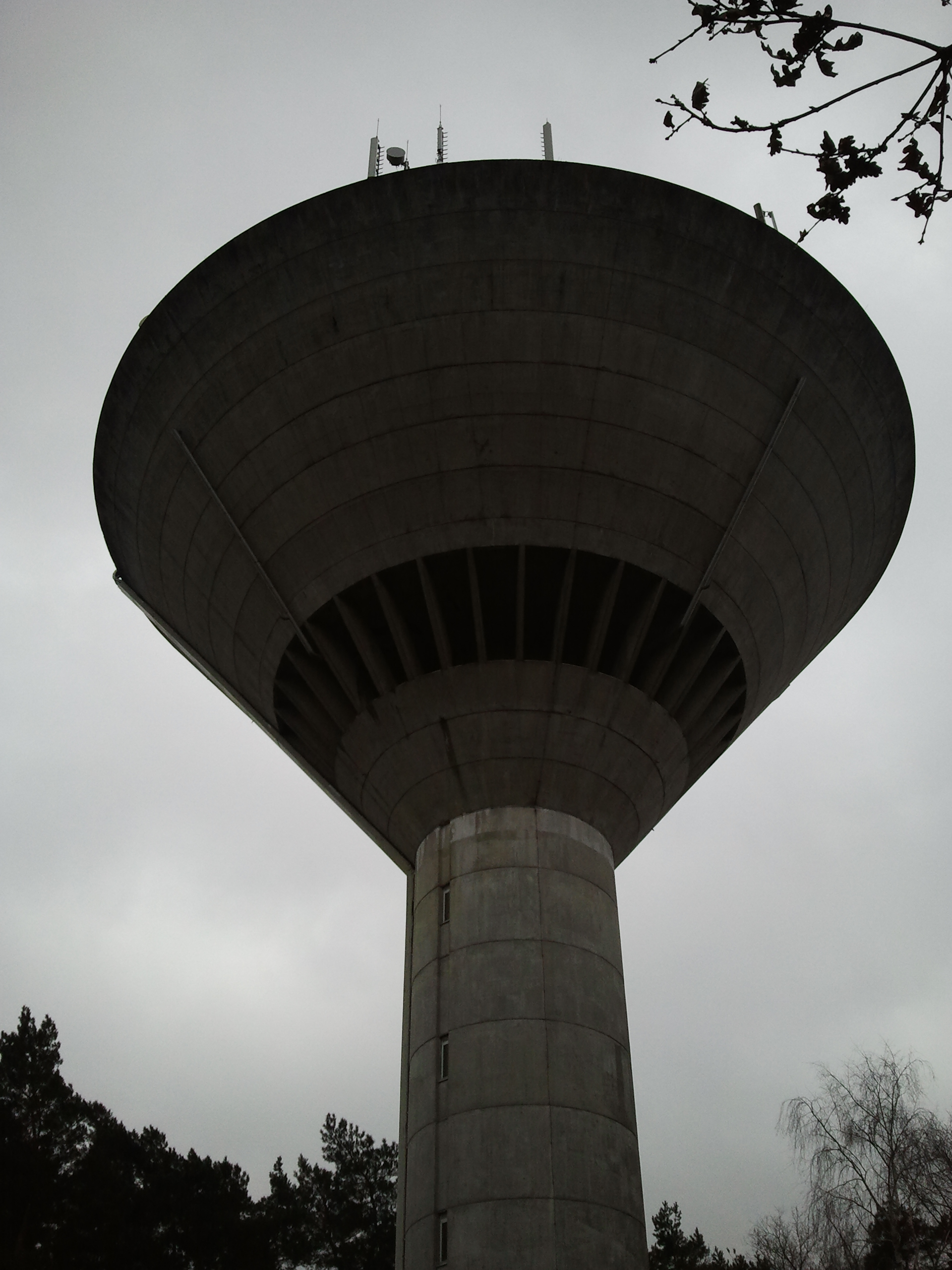
The Zutendaal water tower.

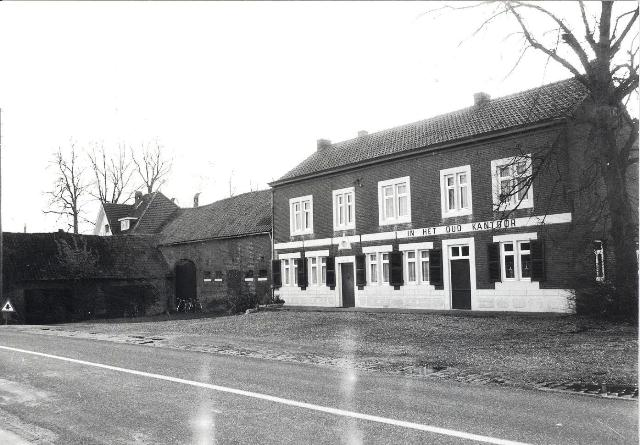
The former post office, still present at Trichterweg 122.

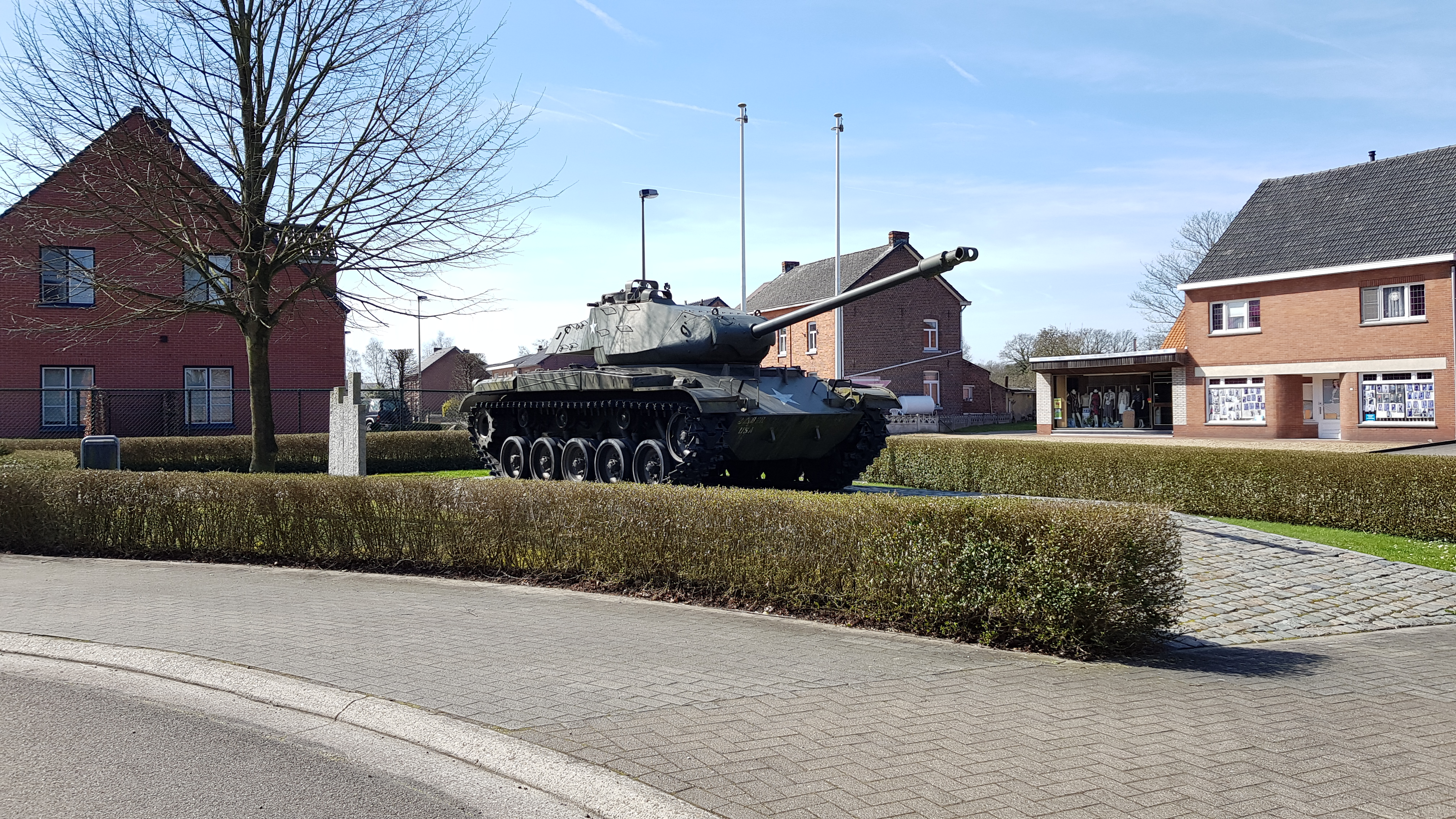
The tank monument near the Zutendaal Air Base.
