= Oud-Rekem =

- Village
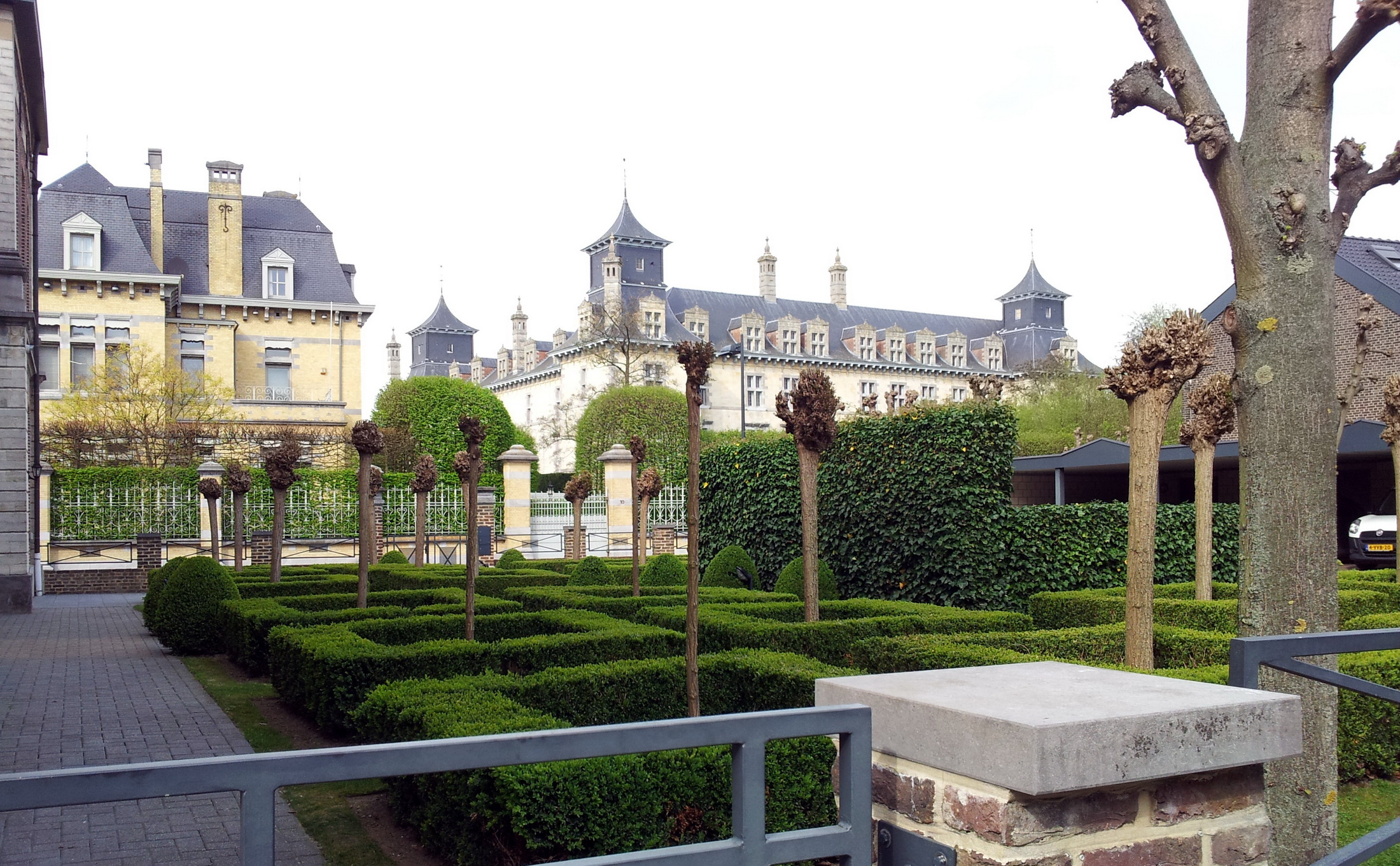
- The gardens of Aspremont-Lynden Castle

- Location in Belgium
- Coordinates: 50.9250°N 5.7072°E
- Country: Belgium
- Region: Flemish Region
- Province: Limburg
- Municipality: Lanaken

Area
  - Total: 0.25 km^{2} (0.097 sq mi)

Population (2021)
  - Total: 415
  - Density: 1,700/km^{2} (4,300/sq mi)
- Time zone: CET

Oud-Rekem is a village in the Lanaken municipality of the Limburg province of Belgium. The village is considered one of the most authentic villages of Belgium. Since 1994, it is protected as a monument.

== History ==
Oud-Rekem was first mentioned in 1140 as Radekeim. The village was first a heerlijkheid. In 1356, it became a barony, and was elevated to county in 1623.

During the 16th, 17th and 18th century, the town was located in a heavily contested area. Oud-Rekem was plundered, and had to station troops on multiple occasions. In 1602, the first walls were erected around the town. Between 1625 and 1630, a second layer of defence was erected. In 1638, a third wall was built in between the first and second. Even though the walls were removed between 1825 and 1836, traces are still visible.

In 1795 or 96, Oud-Rekem became part of Rekem, and in 1977, the municipality was merged into Lanaken.

In 1994, the old centre was protected as a monument. Oud-Rekem won the election for most beautiful village of Flanders in 2008.

== Sights ==
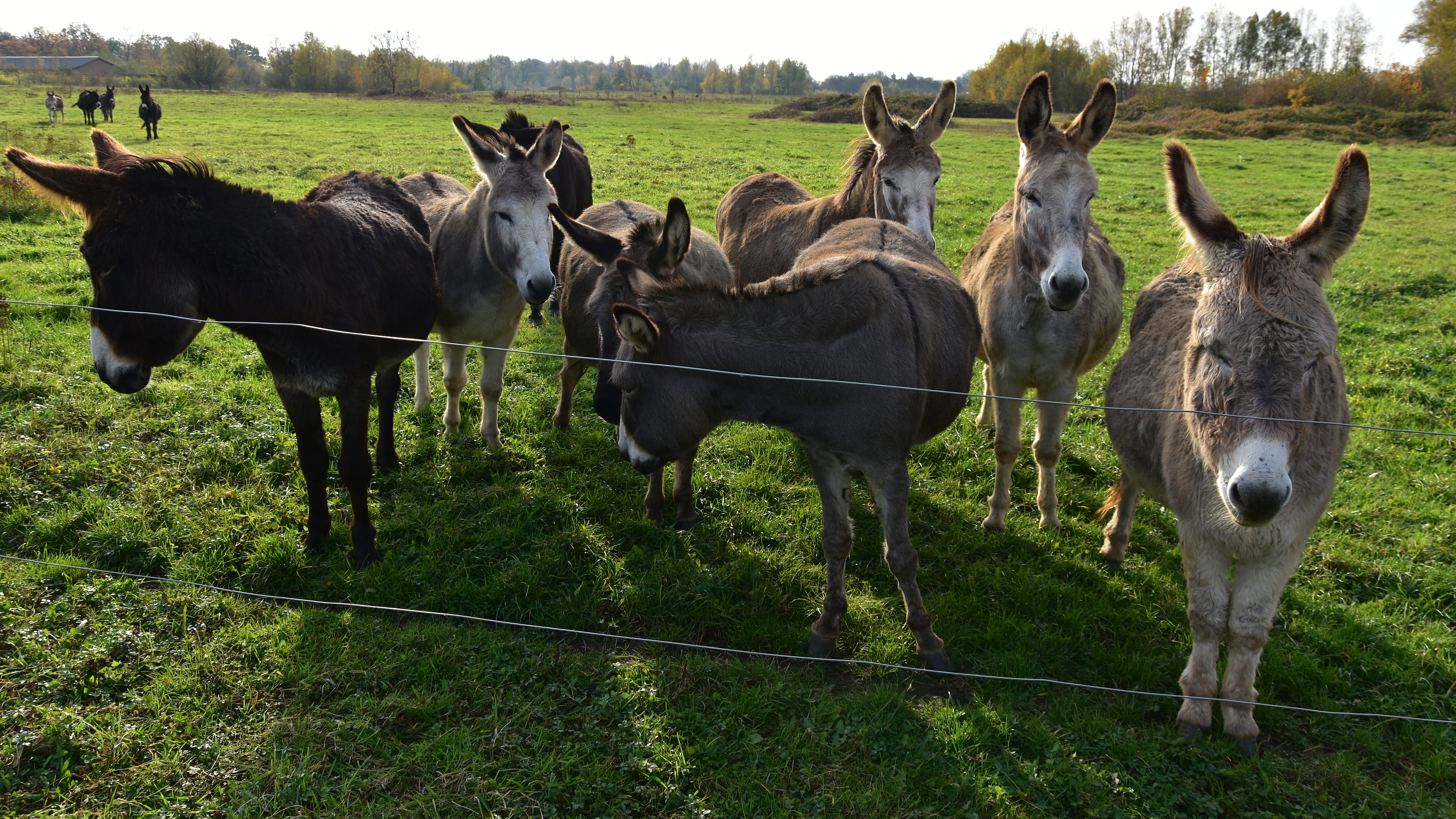
Donkeys in Oude Weerd

The Aspremont-Lynden Castle is located in the centre. The original castle dated from the Carolingian era. A larger castle was built in 1350 and existed until 1507. In 1597, the current castle was built by Count Herman d'Aspremont-Lynden. In 1792, the castle was confiscated by the French who demolished parts of the building. In 1921, the castle became a psychiatric hospital. The castle is surrounded by a large garden.

The Oude Weerd is a nearby nature reserve which consists of grasslands, hedges, and pools. It is home to badgers and beavers.
