= Costen van Halmale =

Costen van Halmale (c. 1435–1508) was a lawyer and chronicler who served on Antwerp's city council.

== Life ==
Halmale was born between 1432 and 1437, the son of Jan van Halmale and Margriet Bacheleer. He studied law at the University of Orléans, matriculating in 1457. In 1472 he married Katharina van Werve. From 1491 to 1508 he served as an alderman of Antwerp, and in 1487 as mayor. He died on 5 April 1508.

== Writing ==
Halmale was the initial author of a family chronicle that was continued by his son and grandson. Known as the Annales Antwerpienses, this gave other historians an important view of family and political relations in 16th-century Antwerp. This manuscript is conserved in the Royal Library of Belgium.
