= Florent Crabeels =

Belgian painter

Florent Nicolas Crabeels
- Born: December 5, 1829; Antwerp, Belgium
- Died: June 7, 1896 (aged 66); Antwerp, Belgium
- Occupation: painter

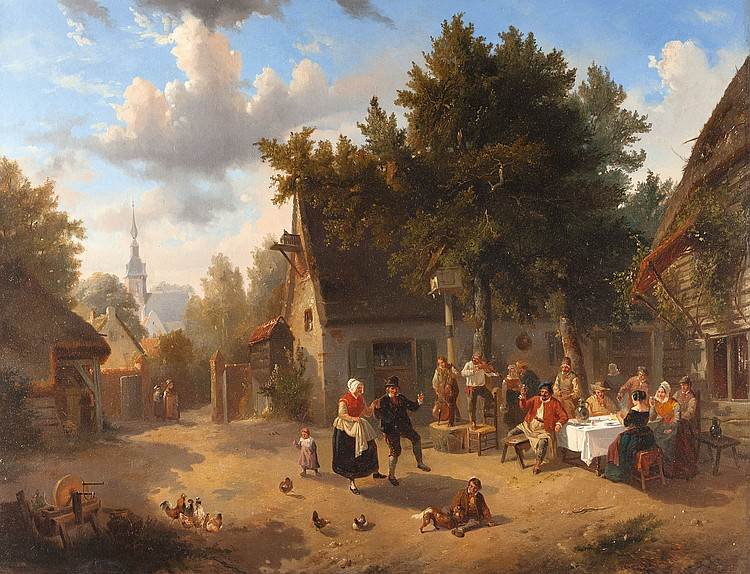
Peasant Dance

Florent Nicolas Crabeels (5 December 1829, Antwerp – 7 June 1896, Antwerp) was a Belgian genre and landscape painter.

== Life and work ==
He studied at the Royal Academy of Fine Arts in Antwerp, with Jacob Jacobs and Egide Linnig.

At first, he painted scenes from villages and small town markets. Later, he turned to landscapes from the Kempen region, and became an ardent supporter of painting en plein air. Much of his work was done in the artists' colony at Wechelderzande, together with Isidore Meyers, Jacques Rosseels (1828–1912), and Adriaan Jozef Heymans; a member of the Kalmthoutse School of landscape painting.

In 1886, he was one of the founding members of "L’Art Indépendant". He became a Neo-Impressionist and returned to painting genre scenes around 1890.

In addition to being a painter, he was also well known as an engraver.

== Sources ==
- Paul Bergmans: "Crabeels, Florent Nicolas". In: Ulrich Thieme (Ed.): Allgemeines Lexikon der Bildenden Künstler von der Antike bis zur Gegenwart, Vol.8: Coutan–Delattre. E. A. Seemann, Leipzig 1912, pp. 41–42 (Online)
- Camille Lemonnier, L’Ecole belge de Peinture (1830-1905), 1906, reprinted in 1991, Editions Labor, ISBN 978-2-8040-0638-9
