= Adriaan Jozef Heymans =

Belgian impressionist landscape painter

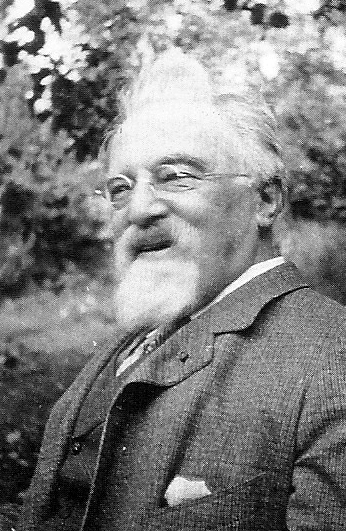
- Adriaan Jozef Heymans (date unknown)
- Born: Adriaan Jozef Heymans; 11 June 1839; Antwerp, Belgium
- Died: December 1921 (aged 82); Brussels, Belgium
- Education: Royal Academy of Fine Arts of Antwerp
- Occupation: Painter

Adriaan Jozef Heymans (or Adrien-Joseph Heymans; 11 June 1839 in Antwerp – December 1921 in Brussels) was a Belgian impressionist landscape painter.

== Biography ==
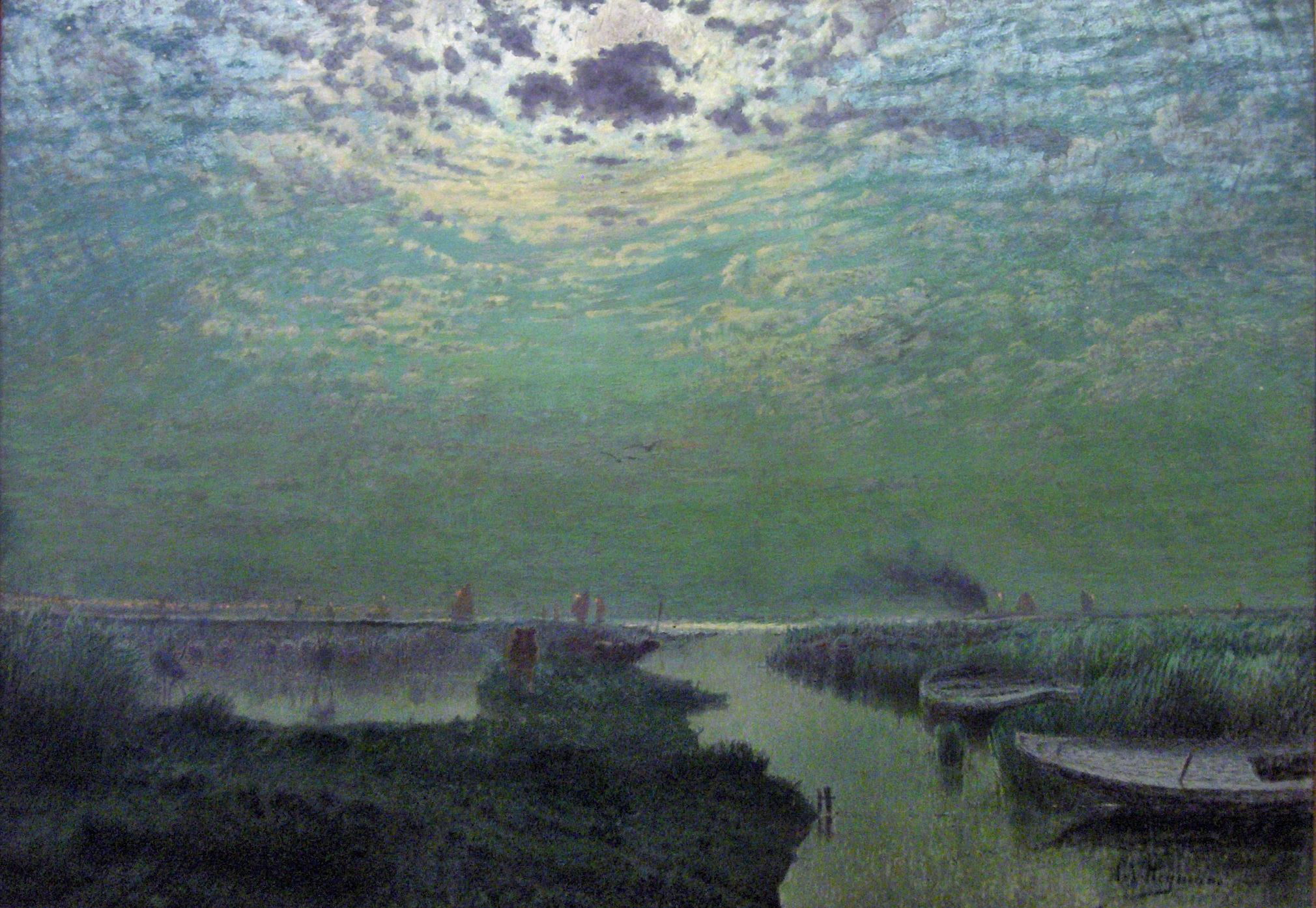
Moonlit Sky (1907)

Early Morning. Museum of Fine Arts, Ghent. c. 1907

His father was a trader in window-glass, who died when Heymans was only seven. Afterward, he was partly raised by his uncle, the mayor of Wechelderzande, a small village near Antwerp, where he first learned to appreciate nature.

In 1853, he entered the Royal Academy of Fine Arts of Antwerp, where he studied under Jacob Jacobs, later attending the Académie Royale des Beaux-Arts in Brussels, but he always considered himself to be essentially self-taught. During a stay in Paris from 1855 to 1858, he was strongly influenced by the Barbizon School. By the time of the Brussels Salon in 1860, he was turning toward impressionism.

He soon returned to Wechelderzande and began painting plein air, both there and in the vicinity of Kalmthout. Many other painters came to the Kempen area seeking inspiration; often living in tent camps and waiting for the desired lighting effects. Together with Isidore Meyers, Théodore Baron, Jacques Rosseels (1828–1912) and Florent Crabeels, he helped found what was known as the "Kalmthoutse School" of painting, also known as the "Grey School" because of their preference for grey and silvery shades. He is also considered to be a member of the "Dendermondse School" and the "Genkse School", because he was active in those areas.

In 1869, he married and settled in Brussels, where he was a c0-founder of the Société Libre des Beaux-Arts and several artists' associations. In 1881, he became an officer in the Order of Leopold and was named a Knight in the French Legion of Honor.

Sometime in the 1890s, he returned to Kalmthout and his style slowly evolved into a form of realism with occasional touches of pointillism to accentuate the colors. By 1913, his health had deteriorated so much that he was forced to give up painting.
