= Salphen =

Village in Flanders, Belgium

Salphen Zalfen
- Village
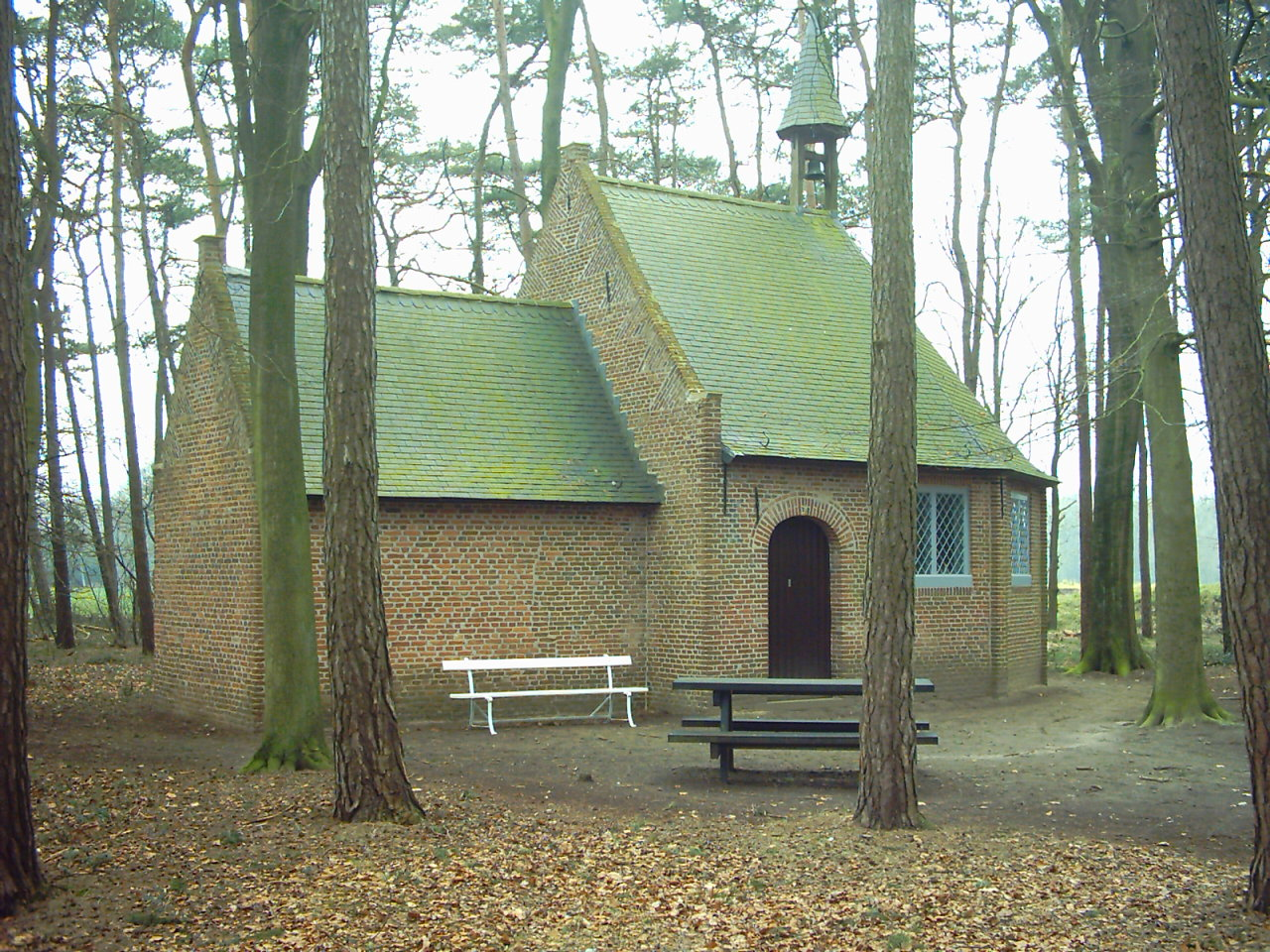
- Chapel of Salphen

- Location in Belgium
- Coordinates: 51.275°N 4.7415°E
- Country: Belgium
- Region: Flemish Region
- Province: Antwerp
- Municipality: Malle

Area
  - Total: 10.81 km^{2} (4.17 sq mi)

Population (2021)
  - Total: 38
  - Density: 3.5/km^{2} (9.1/sq mi)
- Time zone: CET

Salphen (also Zalfen) is a hamlet which is part of the village of Oostmalle in the Campine region of Flanders, Belgium. The history of Salphen dates back to the 13th century when in the records of the Chapter of Our Lady (Dutch: O.L. Vrouw Kapittel) of Antwerp it was called Zalhulfe.

== Chapel of Saint Anthony ==
The earliest traces of Zalhuffle date back to 1278. In 1625 the farmer Adriaan Mattheussen built a chapel for the people of Oostmalle, which fled the village to escape the Bubonic plague. Two of his daughters and other relatives were among the victims. Because they were refused a burial in Wechelderzande, they were buried in Salphen. Adriaan Mattheussen built the chapel to commemorate the deceased.

The chapel became a popular destination for pilgrims which visited the chapel. In 1710 a bell from the Antwerp bell founder Witlockx was installed in the chapel. However, the bell tower and the bell were removed in 1983.

In 1726 the chapel was enlarged with the support of Robert Ots. The year of the enlargement of the chapel is placed in the wall, together with the initials of the stonemason I.H. In 1734 a statue of the Our lady from the altar of the church of Rijkevorsel was placed in the chapel. In 1944 the chapel was destroyed by a V-1 flying bomb, but in 1945 the chapel could be used again.

== Procession of Saint Anthony ==
Since 1971, the ancient Saint Anthony procession is restored, and it is being organized on the Saturday which is closest to 17 January, the feast day of Saint Anthony. After mass, the heads of pigs are sacrificed to Saint Anthony and sold at an auction, horses are blessed and a fire for Saint Anthony is made. A fair is held until late at night.

== See also ==
- Blommerschot

== Sources ==
- Malle history (Dutch)
- Salphen: Sint-Antonius-Abt (Dutch)
