= Peter van Hove =

Peter van Hove (died 1793) was a Flemish Friar Minor, lector in theology and exegete.

== Biography ==
Peter van Hove was born at Retie, in the Campine region of Flanders (Belgium). He was a pupil of Willem Smits, founder and first prefect of the "Musæum Philologico-Sacrum", a Franciscan Biblical institute at Antwerp, which had for its scope the training of Franciscan students in the languages appertaining to Biblical study, in Biblical history, geography, chronology and other subsidiary branches, such as are requisite for a critical and literal interpretation of the Sacred Text.

Upon his master's death, in 1770, Van Hove was entrusted with the direction of this flourishing school, which, in the prime of its activity, fell a prey to the fury of the French Revolution. He died at Antwerp, in 1793.

== Writings ==
Prior to his appointment as prefect, Van Hove had published several noteworthy historical and archæological theses, the first of which, "Imago polemico-sacra primi sæculi religionis Christi seu fidei, doctrinæ et morum disciplinæ Ecclesiæ Apostolicæ" (Brussels, 1765), is based chiefly upon the writings of St. Paul. Then followed: "Sacra Iconographia a pictorum erroribus vindicata" (Antwerp, 1768); "Chanaan seu Regnum Israelis Theocraticum, in XII Tribus Divisum" (Antwerp, 1770); and "Messias seu Pascha nostrum immolatus Christus" (Antwerp, 1771). The author devotes much space to exegetical and critical digressions which have a special value. In the last of these works he gives an excellent chronology of the Gospels.

Sixteen folio volumes of Smits's Flemish translation of the Vulgate and his famous commentary had already been edited when, on Smits's death, the immense task devolved upon his pupil. Van Hove first completed and edited "Liber Numeri Vulgatæ Editionis", I (Antwerp, 1772), II (Antwerp, 1775), twelve chapters of which had been prepared by Smits. Following the plan adopted by his predecessor, Van Hove added, of his own, "Prolegomena ac Tentamen Philologico-Sacrum de tempore celebrandi Paschatis Veteris Testamenti", etc.

The same series also includes the "Liber Deuteronomii" (Antwerp, 1777–80), in 2 volumes. This work brought to a close the publication of this valuable translation and commentary, which, however, comprises only the Psalms, the Sapiential Books and the Pentateuch.

Lastly, Van Hove took up his pen in defence of the Catholic faith. He wrote the "Apologismus Polemicus ad Deut. XVII." (Antwerp, 1782), which is a compilation of arguments, such as had been put forward by Bergier and other French apologists of the eighteenth century, in favour of the truth of revealed religion and the infallibility of the Catholic Church.

== Sources ==
- Herbermann, Charles, ed. (1913). "Peter van Hove". Catholic Encyclopedia. New York: Robert Appleton Company.
