= Maria Rosseels =

Belgian Catholic writer (1916-2005)

- Born: 23 October 1916; Borgerhout, Belgium
- Died: 18 March 2005 (aged 88); Kalmthout, Belgium
- Other names: E. M. Vervliet
- Occupation: writer

Maria, Baroness Rosseels (23 October 1916 – 18 March 2005), also known with her pen name "E. M. Vervliet", was a Belgian Catholic writer.

== Biography ==
The first years of her life, she lived in the Goedendagstraat in Borgerhout. When Maria was 7 years old, the family moved to Oostmalle, where she already started to write. She went to school at the "Heilig Graf" school for girls in Turnhout.

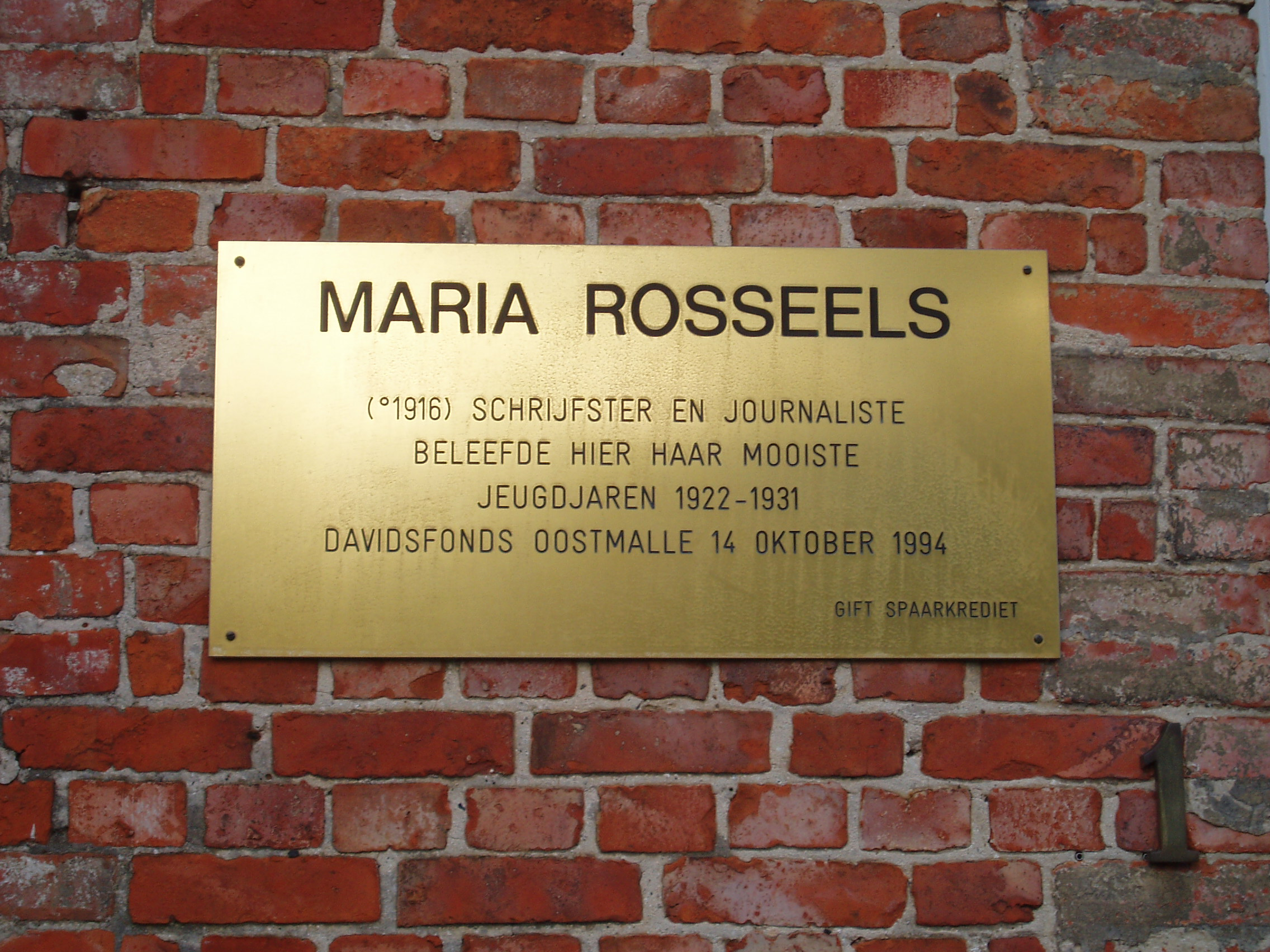
Plate at house in Oostmalle

In 1933, the family moved to Essen and later to Kalmthout. After three years of technical education she went to the College for Women in Antwerp. She started her professional career as a teacher at a school in Gierle, but she left the school to work, from 1941 up to 1944, at the department of internal affairs of the Ministry of Labor in Brussels.

In 1945, she became a secretary at De Pijl, a publisher associated with the Flemish Catholic Scouts. During this time, she also took her first steps in journalism as a freelance journalist for De Courant, a daily newspaper that ran from 1937 to 1939. In 1947 she became editor at the daily De Standaard where she would eventually become the movie critic and author of the woman page. After her retirement in 1977 she continued working as a movie critic.

In addition to her journalism, she built an impressive literary oeuvre, notably creating several important female characters. Chief among them is Elisabeth from the Elisabeth trilogy, the first part of which was published in 1953. As a Christian writer she drew attention with novels such as Ik was een christen (E: I was a Christian) (1957), Dood van een non (E: Dead of a nun) (1961; movie in 1975 by P. Collet en P. Drouot) and Wacht niet op de morgen (E: Don't wait for the morning) (1969). Her best-known book was Dood van een non (1961), which was translated into several languages and was awarded on several occasions.

Rosseels received an honorary PhD from the Katholieke Universiteit Leuven in 1981. She was knighted and became a Baroness in 1988.

== Bibliography ==
- Sterren in de poolnacht (1947)
- Meer suers dan soets moet ic ghestadig dragen (1947)
- Spieghelken (1952)
- Elisabeth (I. De kloosterhoeve) (novel, 1953)
- Elisabeth (II. Ick segh adieu) (novel, 1954)
- Elisabeth (III. Het derde land) (novel, 1954)
- Kunst van schaduwen en dromen (essay, 1954)
- Het woord te voeren past den man (essay) Tielt: Lannoo, 1957.
- Ik was een kristen. I. Het verraad (novel) Leuven: Boekengilde de Clauwaert, 1957.
- Ik was een kristen. II. Achter de horizon (novel) Leuven: Boekengilde de Clauwaert, 1957.
- Oosterse cocktail (novel, 1960)
- Dood van een non. (novel) Leuven: Boekengilde de Clauwaert, 1961.
- Nieuw dagboek van Spieghelken (Spieghelken II), (1963)
- Spieghelken: dagboek van een jong meisje (novel) Tielt: Lannoo, 1964.
- Liefde is een zeldzaam kruid (1966)
- Gesprekken met gelovigen en ongelovigen (novel) Antwerpen: Standaard Uitgeverij, 1967.
- Wacht niet op de morgen (1969)
- Het oordeel, of : Vrijdag zingt de nachtegaal (novel) Lueven: Boekengilde de Clauwaert, 1975.
- Verzameld scheppend proza (3 delen, 1981)
- O Marolleke ( ? )
- Vrouwen in licht en schaduw ( 1964 )
- Van de liefde die doodt ( ? )

== See also ==
- Flemish literature
