= Zefa Raeymaekers =

Belgian politician (1922–2017)

Josepha Raeymaekers
- Born: 11 September 1922; Retie, Belgium
- Died: 1 September 2017 (aged 94); Dessel, Belgium
- Occupations: Journalist, politician, poet
- Political party: CVP

Josepha Raeymaekers or Zefa Raeymaekers (11 September 1922 – 9 January 2017) was a Belgian journalist, poet and politician of the CVP.

== Biography ==
She was born on 11 September 1922 in Retie, Belgium. After attending a vocational school for cutting and seaming, she attended the literary regency and higher art education typography "Plantin". She became a home teacher and freelance journalist for the BRT, among others, and then a professional journalist for the Gazet van Antwerpen. She was the first woman to be professionally recognized as a freelance journalist in Flanders. She was also a poet under the pseudonym Rita Reene. In this capacity she wrote, among other things, a well-known Christmas song that was harmonized by Gaston Feremans.

From 1971 to 1982 she was a councilor for the CVP in Vosselaar. From 1977 to 1981 she was a provincial senator for the Antwerp Province in the Senate and from 1981 to 1987 in the Chamber of Representatives for the Turnhout district. From May 1977 to October 1980, as a result of the then existing dual mandate, she also sat on the Cultuurraad for the Dutch Cultural Community. From 21 October 1980 to December 1987, she was a member of the Flemish Council. She was known for her commitment to nature conservation in the Campine and the pursuit of more democracy at local administrative level there.

In 2012, she was made an honorary citizen of Hoogstraten, in gratitude for having ensured that from 1985 this municipality may use the more prestigious title city. She spent the last years of her life in a residential care center in Dessel.

She entered into her first marriage in 1960 to Paul De Loore (1931-1986) with whom she had four children. In 2002 she entered into her second marriage with Gustaaf Vos (1921-2006).
