= Blommerschot =

Hamlet in Flanders, Belgium

- Hamlet
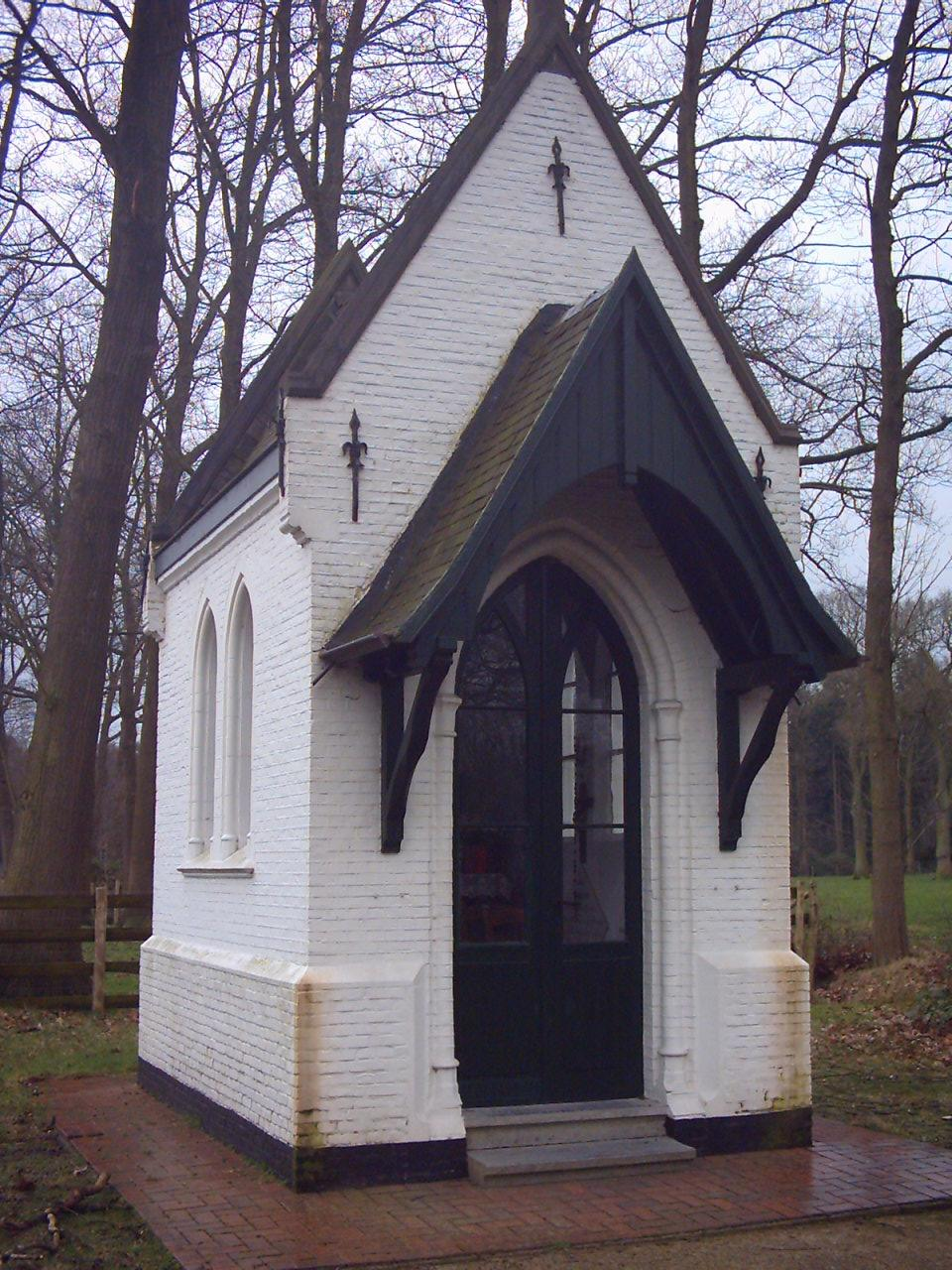
- Chapel of Our Lady of Lourdes, located at Blommerschot

- Location in Belgium
- Coordinates: 51.254°N 4.758°E
- Country: Belgium
- Region: Flemish Region
- Province: Antwerp
- Municipality: Malle

Area
  - Total: 10.81 km^{2} (4.17 sq mi)

Population (2021)
  - Total: 38
  - Density: 3.5/km^{2} (9.1/sq mi)
- Time zone: CET

Blommerschot was a heerlijkheid located in the southeast of Oostmalle in the Campine region of Flanders, Belgium. Blommerschot was already mentioned in 1300 as Eene oude Ridderlyck hof (E: a noble court), and possibly dates back from a Frankish settlement. In the 17th century it was owned by Johan de Proost, Lord of Wechel, who obtained the feudal rights of the Land of Turnhout (Wechelderzande-Vlimmeren, Lille, Gierle, Beerse-Vosselaar) from Philip IV Duke of Brabant in 1626.

In the forests of Blommerschot stands a former hunting pavilion (Castle of Blommerschot), and a Chapel of Our Lady of Lourdes (1900). The Cross of Blommerschot, located at Pulderbos, commemorates Léon Nève de Mévergnies (La Hulpe, 20 July 1848–Ghent, 26 January 1934).

== See also ==
- Salphen

== Sources ==
- Malle history
