= Frans Van Giel =

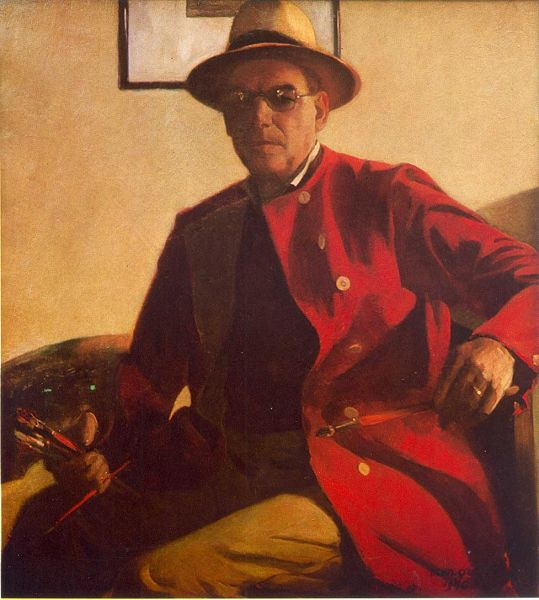
Frans Van Giel

Frans Van Giel (born Franciscus Alexius van Giel; 16 July 1892 – 7 April 1975) was a Belgian painter who was born in Oostmalle and died in Wechelderzande.

== Notable achievements and associations ==
He is called the painter of the Campine and was a friend of the painter Jakob Smits. From 1930 until his death in 1975, he lived in Wechelderzande, and is also buried there.

== Sources ==
- Frans Van Giel
