= Oostmalle Airfield =

Oostmalle Airfield Zoersel/Oostmalle Airfield
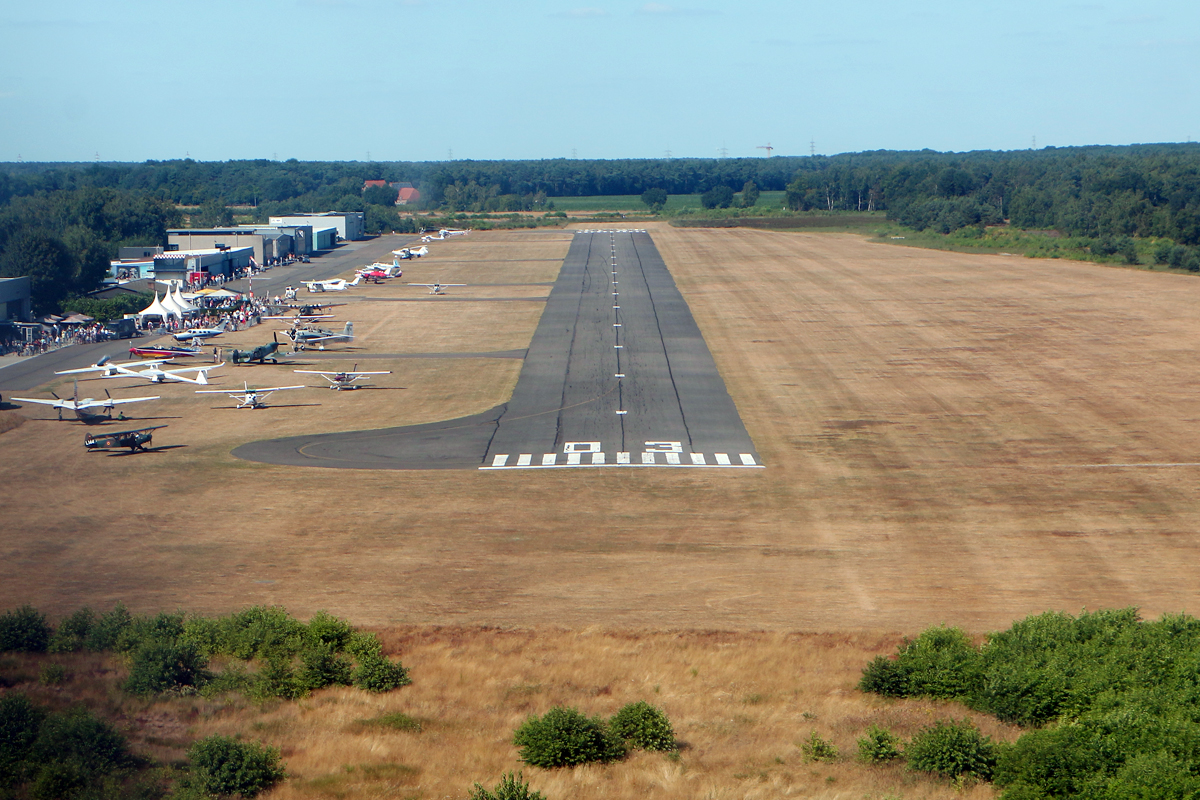
- IATA: OBL; ICAO: EBZR

Summary
- Airport type: Military/Public
- Location: Oostmalle, Belgium
- Elevation AMSL: 45 ft / 14 m
- Coordinates: 51°15′53″N 004°45′12″E

Map
- Location in Belgium

Runways
Direction	Length		Surface
Direction	m	ft	Surface
05/23	799	2,621	Asphalt/Concrete
- Sources: Belgian AIP

Oostmalle Airfield (IATA: OBL, ICAO: EBZR) is an airport in the Antwerp province of the Flemish Region of Belgium. It is located east of the town of Zoersel, south of the town of Oostmalle, and west of the town of Wechelderzande, in the municipality of Malle.

== See also ==
- List of airports in Belgium
