= Van Vlees en Bloed =

Belgian television series

- Van Vlees en Bloed series poster
- Created by: Tom Van Dyck, Michiel Devlieger
- Directed by: Michiel Devlieger, Tom Van Dyck, Michel Vanhove
- Starring: Reinhilde Decleir; Lucas Van den Eynde; Sien Eggers; Tom Dewispelaere
- Theme music composer: Koen Brandt
- Country of origin: Belgium
- Original language: Dutch
- No. of seasons: 1
- No. of episodes: 7

Production
- Producer: Leen Lombaert
- Running time: 50 min.
- Production company: Woestijnvis

Original release
- Network: VRT 1
- Release: 1 January – 12 February 2009

Van Vlees en Bloed (English: "Of Flesh and Blood") is an international award-winning Belgian tragicomedy and miniseries written by Tom Van Dyck and Michiel Devlieger. The series was produced by Woestijnvis and first aired in 2009 on the Belgian channel Eén.

The show is about a butcher shop owned by the family Vangenechten since 1952. Although the family name was indirectly inspired by, the characters are entirely fictitious and there is no direct link with the famous Belgian Vangenechten family.

Plot: Whereas André Vangenechten and his wife Liliane Verstappen run the shop, it is actually still owned by André's mother Maria Vangenechten. One day Rudy, the son of André and Liliane, suddenly turns up after an absence of 10 years. Liliane and Maria are happy, but André is not impressed.

The series won many prizes such as a Golden Nymph at the Monte-Carlo Television Festival and a Rockie at the Banff World Media Festival. In Belgium the series won at least 10 awards

== Main cast and characters ==
Name Character	Actor	Description
Maria Vangenechten	Reinhilde Decleir	A widow who controls the whole family. She is the mother of Gerda, André and Luc. The aged woman is still active in the butchery. She selects for example the cows which are to be bought. After her husband died, she assigned André as manager but kept the ownership.
André Vangenechten	Lucas Van den Eynde	He is the eldest son of Maria Vangenechten. He is married with Liliane and father of Rudy. André manages a retail butcher shop which consumes all of his time. In his rare leisure time he prefers to have a drink with his best friend Wilfried. Every day, he walks out with dog Joepie, a Grand Basset Griffon Vendéen. One day he suddenly realizes his mother Maria is the actual owner of the shop and he has no participation at all.
Liliane Verstappen	Sien Eggers	She is married with André Vangenechten and mother of Rudy. She mostly works in the butcher shop.
Rudy Vangenechten	Tom Dewispelaere	He is the son of André and Liliane. He was considered to work in the shop after he finished school, but absconded. One day, he is back willing to work in the shop, but now rejected by André.
Luc Vangenechten	Tom Van Dyck	Luc Vangenechten is the youngest son of Maria Vangenechten, and has mental retardation. He also works in the butchery but backstage: some easy jobs in the preparation process of the meat, doing the dishes, cleaning up the kitchen, ... André does not allow Luc to work in the shop where the customers are, afraid they will not come anymore if they are being served by a "goon".
Gerda Vangenechten	Mieke De Groote	She is the daughter of Maria. She was never interested in the butcher shop and never helped. She is married to Maurice De Brabandere. They do not have children and are " pre-retired" (this is a special case of unemployment benefits in Belgium).
Maurice De Brabandere	Peter Van den Eede	He is married with Gerda Vangenechten. He was first a teacher and later on a school inspector. He seems to be religious and a man of principles. In reality, he is a scheming crook and pushes his minds and plans in an obsessive way. The rest of the family Vangenechten doesn't like him.
Mike Heylen	Koen De Graeve	He is the butcher's fugleman, respected by his employers. He is now afraid about his position and future as Rudy turned up again.
Anke Reyniers	Maaike Neuville	She is counter-assistance. She has a good relation with Liliane and is very punctual and honest. She dislikes all kind of cheating and gossip.
Herman	Herwig Ilegems	The neighbour across the street who observes the shop and the customers every day from his own window. He wants to know all gossips. As soon as he thinks something suspicious or interesting is going on in the shop, he walks in. The other characters find him annoying, but he's a good customer so they keep this a secret.
Wilfried De Boeck	Jos Verbist	A policeman and best friend of André.
JB	Jan Bijvoet	JB was a friend of Rudy Vangenechten. He is a weird and dangerous person and tried to seduce Liliane.
Joepie	Grand Basset Griffon Vendéen	The dog of Luc who spills out one of André's biggest secrets.

== Episodes ==
Episode	Summary
1	Rudy calls his mother telling he will come home next day after he absconded ten years earlier. This has a high impact in the butchery. During the welcome party, a word fight is held between André and Rudy. An upset Maria suffers a stroke and is taken into hospital. Mike is afraid he will lose his job or position and starts a dangerous game. Maurice and Gerda are sure Granny will die during next hours and are very eager to receive Granny's heritage. Luc also pretends having a stroke and is also taken into hospital. Once there he searches for Granny. It's due to his actions, Granny wakes up out of her coma.
2	Granny is discharged from the hospital. Once returned she clearly emphasizes she is still the owner of the butchery. André, still upset about the return of his son, tells Mike he will be his best man. Mike misinterprets this and thinks he is going to be the owner/manager very soon. As soon he realizes what André really meant, he is disappointed in the family and goes on sick leave. Maurice en Gerda take Granny to the coast. They want to buy an apartment and try to haggle Granny so she would give the money. The trip is a disaster as Granny is being attacked by seagulls and is taken into hospital again. When André figures out the truth about the trip he loses control and kicks Maurice knock-out.
3	In his attempt to neglect Rudy, André bribes Luc to have him on his side. He buys a handycam as present. Rudy wants to prove his abilities by making sausages, but his attempt fails. Luc ties up the handycam on the head of Joepie so the dog can record his daily walk in the woods. It's due to this action Joepie reveals one of André's biggest secrets: he's having a sexual affair with Christine, one of the customers. Luc and Rudy see the records and decide not to inform the others. André realizes he is not owner of the butcher shop and he does not know if there is a will. If Maria dies, they might lose the house or have to buy out Gerda and Luc. That's why André starts talking with his mother about the future, but she thinks everything should stay as it is.
4	André en Liliane celebrate their birthday. Rudy gives them a trip to the coast as present. In the hotel they meet JB. JB was a friend of Rudy during the last years. André confesses he has an affair with Christine, one of their customers who always buys pork chops. André is going to end this relationship as he only loves Liliane. Mike, Rudy, Anke and Luc head to town for a drink. There, they meet Christine. Luc heads to her, takes her breast and tells she is a "woodwhore". This results in a fight and the police is called. Wilfried is sent and can commit a steer of middle course.
5	JB turns up in the butchery and it seems he is going to live in. Liliane, still shocked about the cheating of André, realizes she only works for their business. She decides to take a day off to shop with her best friends. She soon discovers she does not have friends anymore as she never made time for them. It now turns up JB and Rudy were in the hormone-mafia during the past years. JB tries to seduce Liliane in which he fails. JB is kicked out by Mike.
6	The yearly funfair will take place next weekend. This is an important weekend for the family as they sell their special and famous "Vangenechten black puddings" only during these days. Only Granny, Liliane, André and Wilfried know the secret ingredient. That's why André and Wilfried head to the woods to illegally shoot a roe deer. Once skinned, André discovers a transmitter in the ear of the deer with the text R.S.B. and a phone number. André calls to the number and ends up at the "Roe deer Study Belgium". It seems the Belgian government started a study on deer to know where they are heading to and how they die. Wilfried pulls back as he is a police officer. André starts running in the woods with the deer's ear so the government will not notice it is dead. Maurice, who is a wood guide, heard the shot and finds André with the skinned deer. Maurice informs the police. Luckily for André, Maurice ends up with Wilfried and his assistance. Wilfried boycotts the interrogation and deletes the files. However, his assistance is not willing to give up and tries to find out the truth. In meantime, Liliane and Granny are informed what happened and they call Gerda. They can convince Gerda the accusation will lead to the closure of the butchery. Once home, Gerda locks out Maurice and demands him to withdraw the accusation.
7	Maurice goes to the police and tells his previous story was a lie. Next he heads to the woods and stays during the night together with André. In meantime, Rudy is informed by Granny and Liliane about the secret ingredient. Rudy goes to the woods to pick up the deer. As he does not know how to fillet the deer he is obliged to call Mike. As they are in a time pressure, Anke is also called to help. Due to the cooperation, the black puddings are ready by opening of the funfair. However, during the funfair there is also a bicycle contest. Mike always dreamt to win the contest, but always failed. As he did not sleep, he does not have enough energy anymore and decides not to participate. Luc does not agree with the decision and gives Mike a banana. The banana contains hormones. These were found by Luc after JB was kicked out. Due to the hormone-banana, Mike gets enough energy and wins the contest. The sale of the black puddings is also a success and even Gerda and Maurice are helping. It seems the whole family is reunited. Just before the ending credits, the camera zooms into Granny who is sitting in a chair and dead. After credits, the family is at the notary. Maurice starts a fight as he contests Granny's will. The content of the will is not revealed.

== Audience measurement ==
The series was a success in Belgium. Episode 4, 5 and 6 break Belgian records for emissions broadcast on a weekday. (The series was broadcast on a Thursday) The average number of viewers was 1.753.500 per episode. Episode 6 reached close to 2 million viewers. The series end up on the third place in best viewed shows. Only one episode of Schalkse Ruiters (broadcast on Sunday)and the finale of De Slimste Mens ter Wereld 2009 did better. Remarkable detail: the finale of last show was sent out after episode 7.

== Trivia ==
- The series was shot in Dessel, Mol and Retie
- The scenes in the woods were shot in Princes Park, Retie The number of visitors increased after the famous "wood fucking scene". Many tourists wanted to see the tree stump where the scene was shot but Woestijnvis never revealed the exact location.
- The family name Vangenechten (sometimes spelled Van Genechten) is generally considered to refer to the famous Flemish dynasty of entrepreneurs rooted in the East of Antwerp (Kempen) with branches all over the world. None of the offspring however actually own a butchery store.
- After the show aired, the interest in the butcher profession increased among young people. A statement by the butcher industry had to be issued, saying that show used outdated techniques, as the job of a butcher isn't what it used to be as it is presented in the series.
