= Bullhead (film) =

- Theatrical Poster
- Directed by: Michaël R. Roskam
- Written by: Michaël R. Roskam
- Produced by: Savage Film
- Starring: Matthias Schoenaerts; Jeroen Perceval; Barbara Sarafian
- Cinematography: Nicolas Karakatsanis
- Edited by: Alain Dessauvage
- Music by: Raf Keunen
- Distributed by: Kinepolis Film Distribution; Drafthouse Films
- Release date: 2 February 2011
- Running time: 128 minutes
- Country: Belgium
- Languages: Dutch; Limburgish; French
- Box office: $151,840 (US)

Bullhead (Dutch: Rundskop) is a 2011 Belgian crime film written and directed by Michaël R. Roskam and starring Matthias Schoenaerts. The film is about farmers being paid or threatened by organised crime "hormone mafia" to use growth hormones on cattle, although the practice is prohibited by law.

Jacky Vanmarsenille, a young Limburgish farmer, is approached by his veterinarian to make a deal with a West-Flemish beef trader to use growth hormones on his cattle. But the murder of a federal policeman, and an unexpected confrontation with a mysterious secret from Jacky's past, set in motion a chain of events with far-reaching consequences.

The film was one of several nominated for an Academy Award in the category of Best Foreign Language Film in 2012. It lost to A Separation. The actors speak mainly in Truiens, a Limburgish dialect.

The film is loosely based on the 1995 murder of Karel Van Noppen, a government livestock inspector in Belgium.

== Plot ==
In Sint-Truiden, cattle farmer Jacky (Matthias Schoenaerts), who runs the family business, visits a distant relative and intimidates him into selling cows. In the Limburg province, a mafia deals in illegal growth hormones and controls the cattle and meat trade. The farmers sell cows to the mafia, who inject the cows with hormones. The cows are slaughtered for food. Jacky is a thirty-something, angry, and lonely man. He has a muscular physique and has become addicted to steroids.

A West Flanders mafia thug returns a car to two bumbling Walloon mechanics, who had earlier stolen it for him, and tells them to make it disappear. They find a bullet hole and see a news report about a murdered police detective and realize the car was involved.

Jacky's veterinarian sets up a deal for him with Marc, mafia boss of the West Flanders province. At the meeting, Jacky is introduced to Marc's associate Diederik. There are suggestions that he has something to do with Jacky's mysterious past. Diederik is serving as a police informant and is employed by police detective Eva, who is investigating the hormone mafia.

Twenty years ago, Jacky and Diederik were childhood best friends. Jacky's dad, also a cattle farmer, dealt with the mafia and brought the boys along to a deal. Jacky has a crush on Lucia, the daughter of one of the mobsters. His intellectually disabled brother Bruno tried to pimp her.

After Jacky's dad takes the boys home, they ride their bikes back to see Lucia, but are caught by Bruno. Bruno forces Jacky onto the ground, and shows off in front of friends, smashing Jacky's testicles with two rocks, effectively castrating him. Disgusted, Bruno's friends abandon him. Diederik leaves as well. When Diederik's father, also a cattle farmer, learns what happened, he forbids Diederik from talking to the police. Such action could ruin his connections with the mafia. To compensate for his injuries, Jacky has to begin injecting testosterone, in order to go through puberty.

In the present, Jacky goes to a store and meets a salesgirl, who is Lucia. He begins following her, and one night, he goes into a nightclub after her. She approaches him, remembering he was a customer. When she tries to speak with him, she is interrupted by her male acquaintance, who flirts with her and asks her to dance. The man leaves the nightclub, and Jacky follows him and savagely attacks him.

Jacky continues to follow Lucia, who goes to visit Bruno. The man is now physically disabled and mute, and living in care accommodation. After she leaves, Jacky confronts Bruno. Lucia begins to suspect that Jacky is the boy attacked by Bruno when they were children.

Lucia visits Jacky at his farm. During their meeting, she receives a call from a friend telling her of the attack on the man who had flirted with her; her friend says the victim is in a coma. Lucia notices bruises on Jacky's knuckles and suspects he is responsible.

The police find the stolen car and arrest the mechanics. They suspect that Jacky is involved in the murder of the detective. Diederik drives to Jacky's farm to warn his former friend that the police are coming to arrest him. After Diederik reveals he is a police informer, the two go on the run.

Jacky attempts to see Lucia, but she refuses to let him into her apartment. He becomes increasingly agitated, and she invites him in. She admits that she had called the police and says she knows that he attacked her friend. In Lucia's bathroom, Jacky administers a high dose of testosterone. The police arrive and arrest him, and in a testosterone-induced rage, he attacks the officers. He is fatally shot in the stomach.

== Cast ==
- Matthias Schoenaerts as Jacky Vanmarsenille
- Jeroen Perceval as Diederik Maes 'Rikkie'
- Jeanne Dandoy as Lucia Schepers
- Barbara Sarafian as Eva Forrestier
- Tibo Vandenborre as Anthony De Greef
- Frank Lammers as Sam Raymond
- Sam Louwyck as Marc de Kuyper
- David Murgia as Bruno Schepers

== Production ==
Roskam worked over five years on the script. It was based in part of on the 1995 murder of government livestock inspector Karel van Noppen, who was investigating the use of growth hormones by farmers. Most of the film is fictitious. Schoenaerts trained up to twice daily, six times a week, bodybuilding over a three-year period to put on 27 kg (60 lb) of muscle to represent Jacky as a man dependent on steroids.

== Release ==
The film was selected for the panorama section of the 61st Berlin International Film Festival. It premiered in the United States at Fantastic Fest in Austin. Drafthouse Films acquired the rights to distribute the film in the United States, where it opened on 17 February 2012 in a limited release.

== Reception ==
=== Critical response ===
The film received generally favourable reviews from critics. Rotten Tomatoes gives the film a score of 87%, based on 75 reviews, and an average rating of 7.08/10. The website's critical consensus states, "Anchored by Matthias Schoenaerts' searing performance, Bullhead is a grim and gripping thriller with the cinematic sinew to match its domineering star's physicality". Metacritic gives the film a weighted average rating of 68/100, based on 24 reviews, indicating "generally favorable reviews".

While criticizing the film's awkward flow due to its use of flashbacks, Roger Ebert of the Chicago Sun Times praised the performance of lead actor Matthias Schoenaerts, noting that

"The one excellent aspect of the film is Matthias Schoenaerts' performance. We often follow him walking in a controlled lurch from side to side, as if merely walking is not enough of a challenge for him. We see his eyes, burning with pain. [...] [The film] impresses because of the pain, sadness and rage contained in the title performance by Flemish actor Matthias Schoenaerts, who bulked up for the role (without steroids), and seems ready to burst from his clothes and even his skin."

=== Awards ===
Bullhead was awarded both the New Authors Audience Award and the New Authors Critic’s Prize for Best Actor (Matthias Schoenaerts) at AFI Fest 2011. The film won the AMD-sponsored Next Wave Award at Fantastic Fest.

Schoenaerts won the FIPRESCI Award for best actor at the Palm Springs International Film Festival. The jury praised the actor’s "superb portrayal of an innocent and sensitive man trapped in a truculent body." It won the Best Film Award at the Ostend Film Festival, received nine Magritte Award nominations in different categories, and won the awards for Best Flemish Film in Coproduction, Best Screenplay, Best Actor (for Schoernaerts) and Best Editing. The film also received the André Cavens Award.

Bullhead was selected as the Belgian entry for the Best Foreign Language Film at the 84th Academy Awards. It was officially nominated by the Academy in this category on 24 January 2012. It ultimately lost to the Iranian submission A Separation.
