= Lodewijk de Koninck =

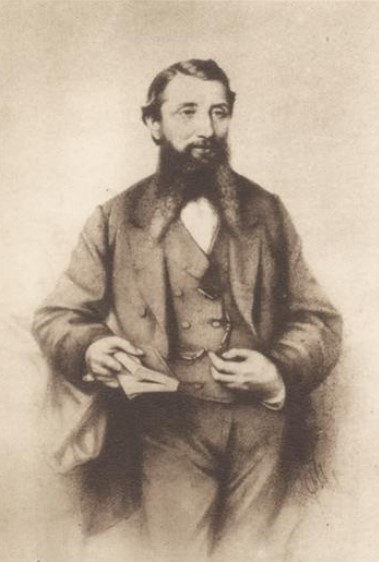
Portrait of Lodewijk De Koninck in 1883.

Lodewijk De Koninck (Hoogstraten, 30 October 1838 - Retie, 22 March 1924) was a Flemish writer.

He studied at the school for teachers Lier and became a teacher in Antwerp. Later he became an inspector of the Catholic primary schools and a teacher at the school for teachers in Mechelen.

As a writer he wrote poems which reflected his strict catholic belief. He is best known for the epic Het menschdom verlost (first edition 1872) (E: Humanity saved), written in Alexandrine verse. He also wrote the libretto of the oratorio Fransciscus of Edgar Tinel.

At the frontwall of his house in the Sint-Martinusstraat (nr. 8) in Retie, there was, in earlier days, a stone with the engraving Hier leefde en stierf dichter Lodewijk De Koninck 1924 (e: Here lived and died the writer Lodewijk De Koninck 1924).

== Bibliography ==
- Heibloemen (1869)
- Het menschdom verlost. Tafereelen (1874)
- Galerij van vaderlandsche tafereelen, opgehangen rond de wieg van P.P. Rubens (1878)
- Ode aan Vondel (1879)
- Verspreide gedichten (1880)
- Ode aan Kiliaan (1882)
- Het menschdom verlost (1883)
- Het menschdom verlost. Heldendicht in twaalf zangen (1883)
- Karelslied (1884)
- Hulde aan (...) Edgard Tinel (1885)
- Franciscus (1887)
- Kerk en Paus (1887)
- Diest en de H. Joannes Berchmans (1888)
- De wonderkerk van Hakendover (1896)
- Het Heilig Bloed van Hoogstraten (1902)
- Lofdicht over het Heilig Sacrament (1902)

== See also ==
- Flemish literature

== Sources ==
- Lodewijk de Koninck
- Lodewijk de Koninck
- G.J. van Bork en P.J. Verkruijsse, De Nederlandse en Vlaamse auteurs (1985)
