= Princes Park, Retie =

Coordinates: 51.23°N 5.0437°E

Prinsenpark

The Princes Park in Retie (Dutch: Prinsenpark) is located in the Campine region of the Antwerp province in Flanders, Belgium. It is a beautiful park that consists of ponds, trails, woodlands, meadows, playgrounds, picnic spots, canals and moorland which attract nature lovers and is also popular for walking, jogging, cycling and sightseeing.

== History ==
The poor soil of the Campine region was called an Aart and was used by local farmers. In 1854, King Leopold I of Belgium acquired about 398 hectares of the Aart of Retie (Dutch: Retiese Aart) with the intention of creating a park and building a castle. However, the castle was never built.

In 1950 the coal mines of Beringen acquired the park and used it to grow pines for the mines to support the tunnels. In 1972, the Province of Antwerp acquired the domain and turned it into a public park. The park became well known for scenes of the TV series Flesh and Bones which were shot in the park.

== Sources ==
- Gids voor Vlaanderen, Ed. Omer Vandeputte, Filip Devos, O. Vandeputte, p. 382, Lannoo, 2007
- Prinsenpark (Antwerp province)
- Prinsenpark (Retie)
- Prinsenpark (photo, location)
