= Oostmalle =

- Village
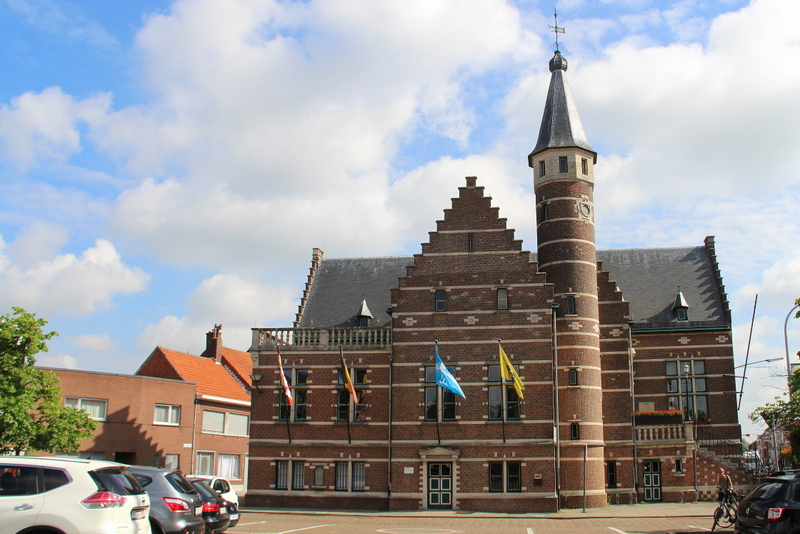
- Former town hall

- Location in Belgium
- Coordinates: 51.2995°N 4.7333°E
- Country: Belgium
- Region: Flemish Region
- Province: Antwerp
- Municipality: Malle

Area
  - Total: 28.13 km^{2} (10.86 sq mi)

Population (2021)
  - Total: 7,388
  - Density: 262.6/km^{2} (680.2/sq mi)
- Time zone: CET

Oostmalle is a village which is located in the Belgian province of Antwerp. The village itself is part of the municipality of Malle.

Oostmalle was an independent municipality until 1976. It has a surface area of 28.27 km^{2} and in 2004 had 6,510 inhabitants.

== History ==
See history of Malle.

== Tourism ==
The most important curiosity of Oostmalle is the Renesse Castle. The Chapel of Our Lady of Perpetual Help (Dutch: Onze-Lieve-Vrouw van Bijstand) at the Herentalsebaan, was built by Leonard Pierre Joseph du Bus de Gisignies in 1837. In 1930 a Lourdes cave was added to the chapel (inaugurated on 7 May 1933), and in 1934 a Stations of the Cross was added in remembrance of King Albert I of Belgium (sculptor was Simon Goossens). The Chapel of Saint Anthony (Dutch: Sint-Antoniuskapel) in the hamlet Salphen dates from 1626.

Oostmalle Airfield is located south on the territory of Oostmalle, close to the hamlet of Salphen, and the forest of Blommerschot. This airfield is currently used for recreational purposes (Gliding). There was some talk of using this airfield as an alternative for the Airport in Deurne should it have to close.

Each year the international Sluitingsprijs Oostmalle is organised in Oostmalle. It marks the end of the Cyclo-cross season.

== Tornado ==
On Sunday 25 June 1967 at 4:17 pm Oostmalle was hit by a tornado which destroyed the church and the centre of the village. Of the church, only the tower was rebuilt in its original state. More than half of the 900 houses in the village were damaged, 135 houses were completely destroyed.

== Notable inhabitants ==
- Viscount Bernard Aimé Léonard du Bus de Gisignies (1808–1874)
- Viscount Leonard Pierre Joseph du Bus de Gisignies (1780–1849)
- Frans Van Giel, painter (1892–1975)
- Maria Rosseels, journalist and writer (1916–2005)

== Gallery ==
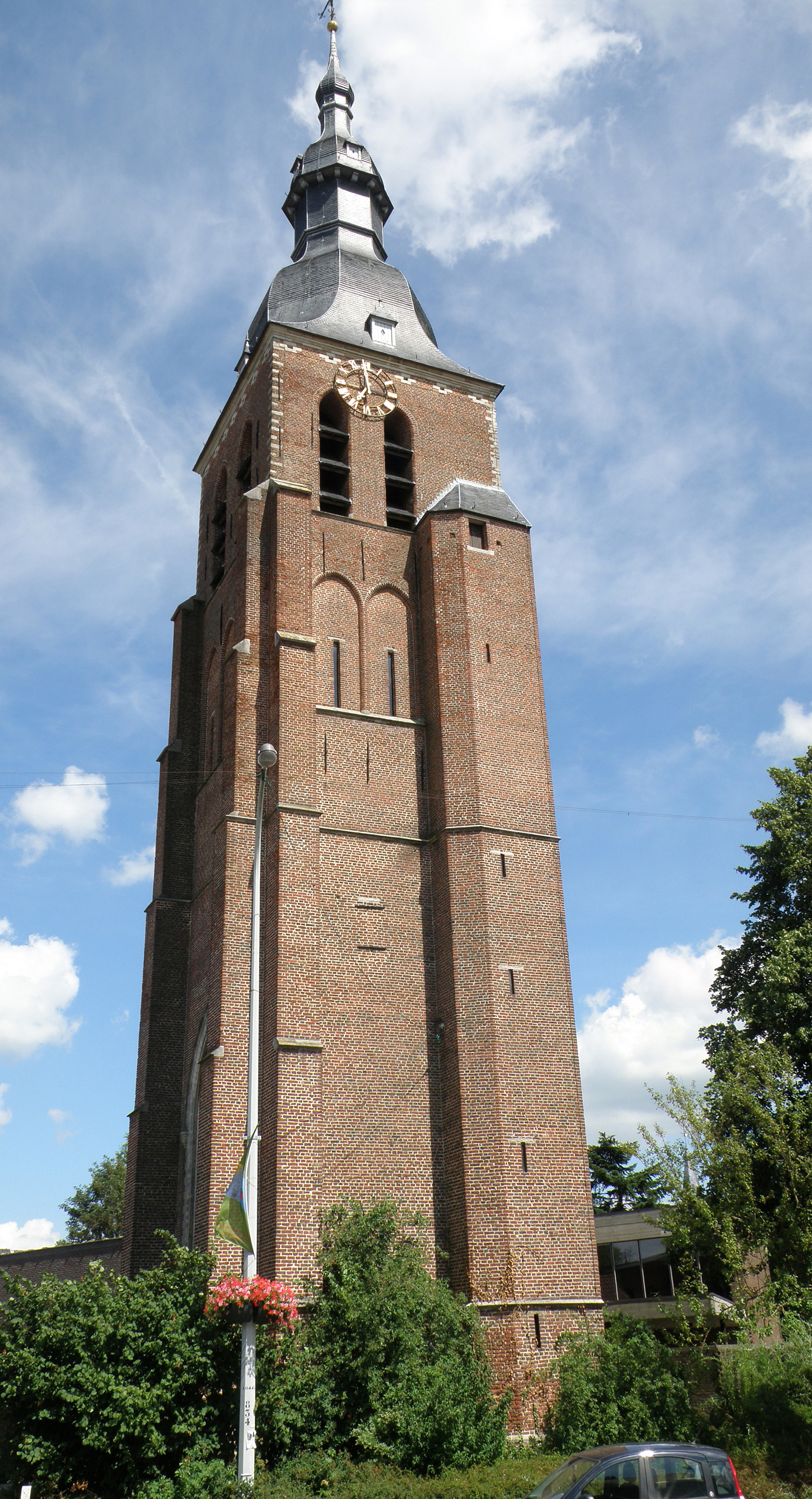
St Laurentius Church

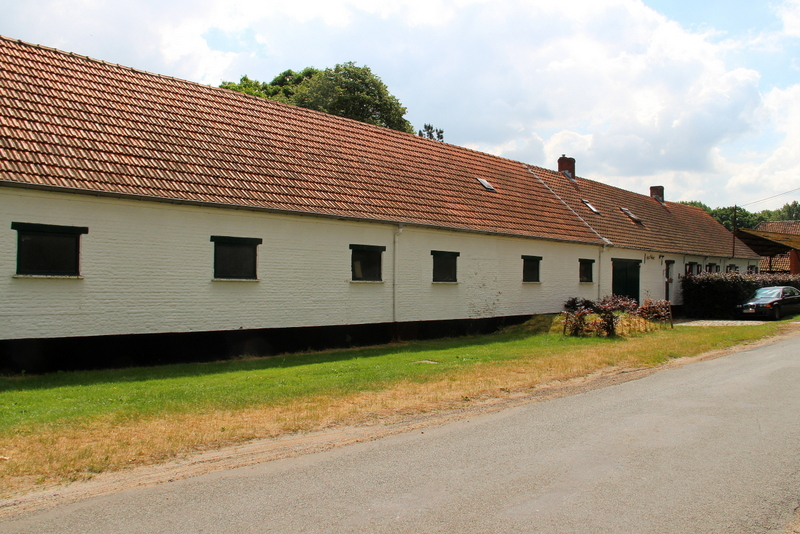
Farm in Oostmalle

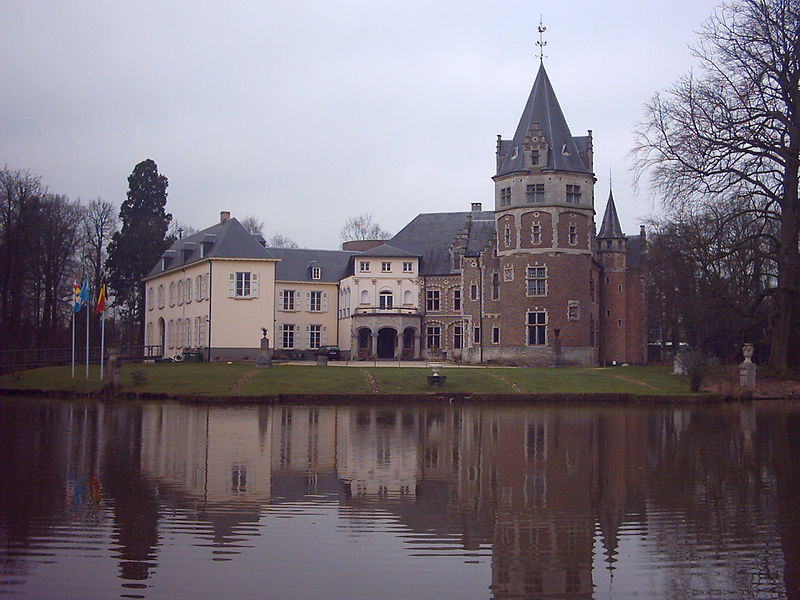
Renesse Castle

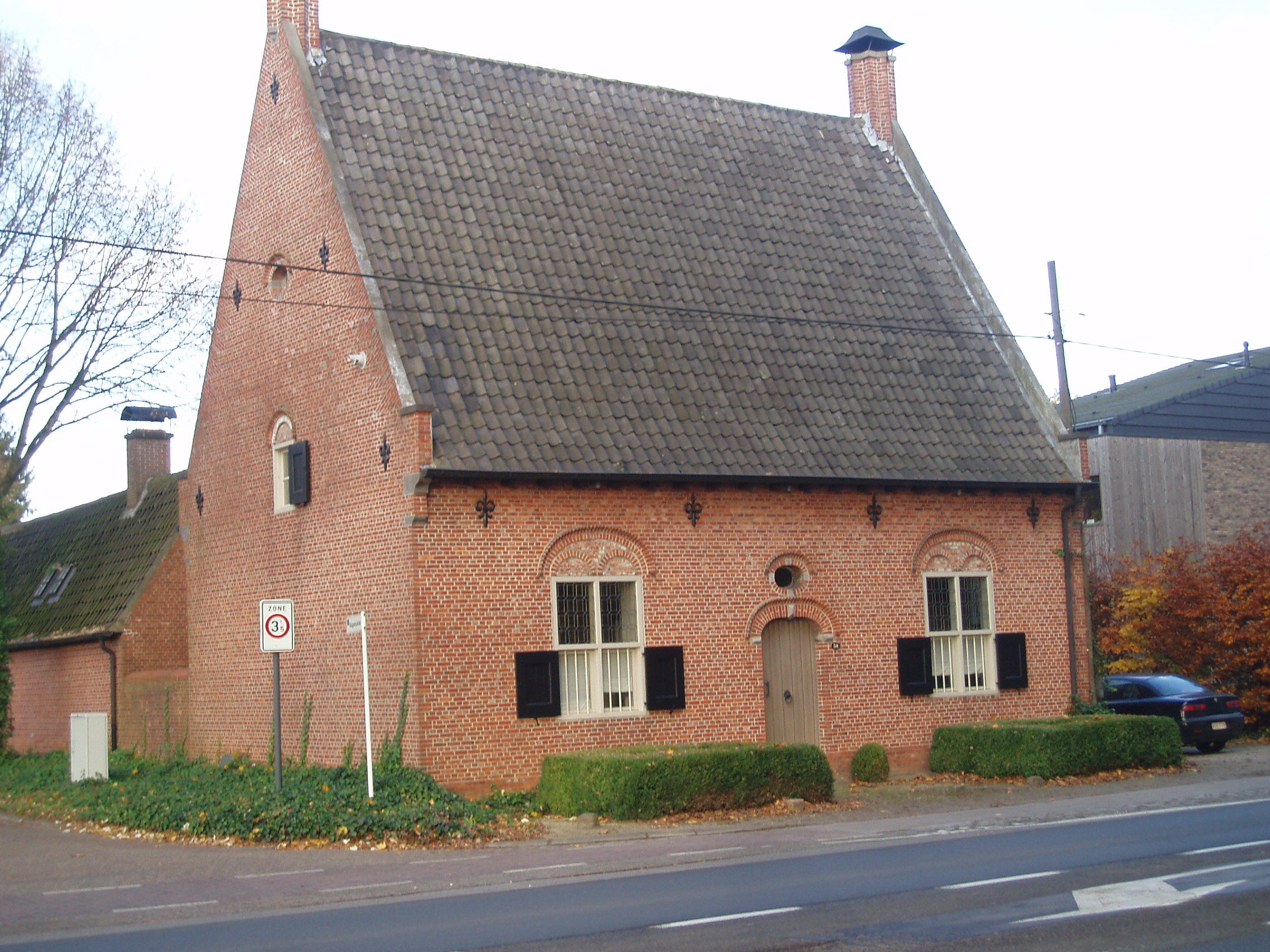
Corner house

== See also ==
- Westmalle
