= Cartierheide =

Nature reserve in the Netherlands

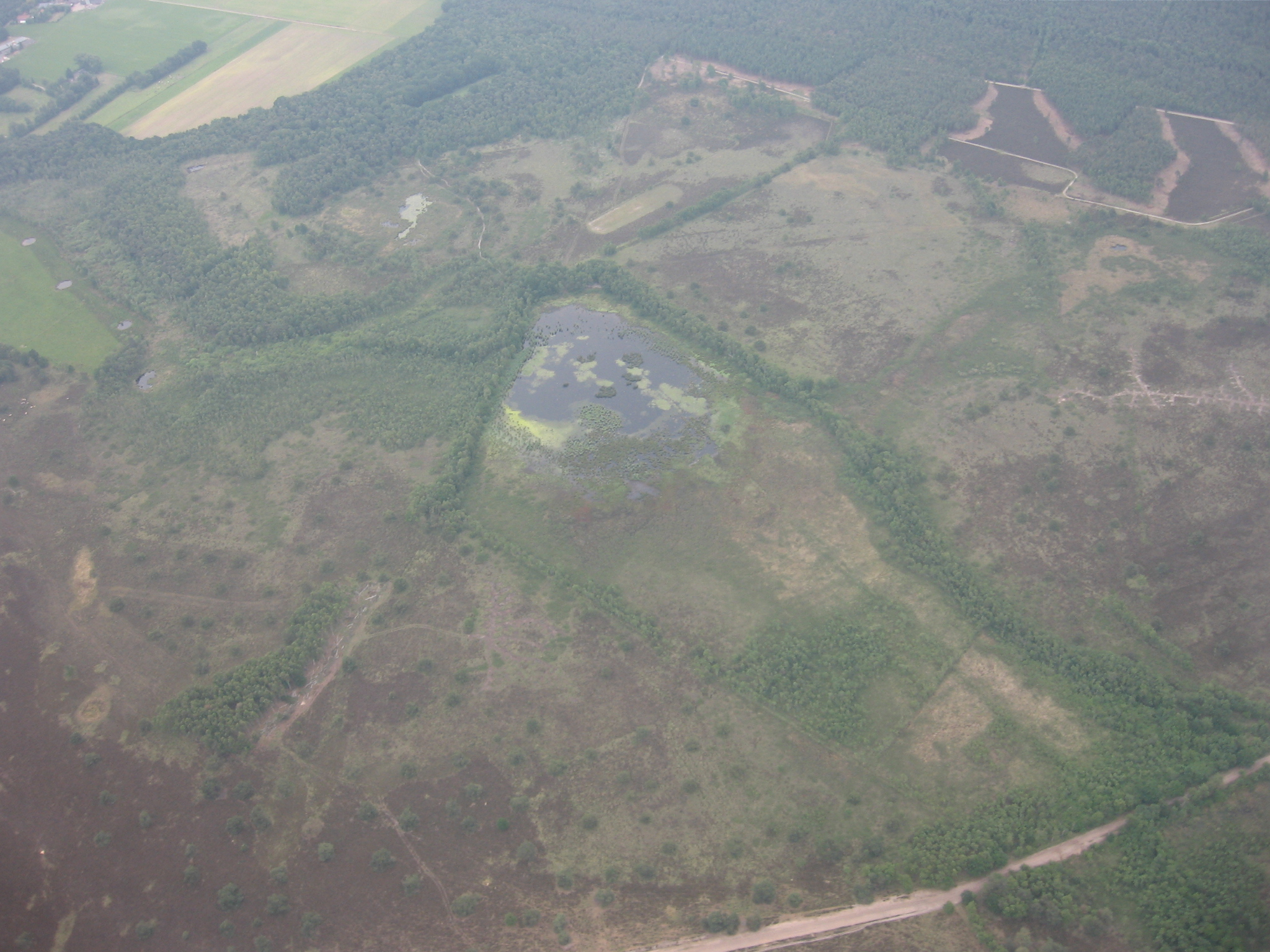
- Cartierheide
- Interactive map of Cartierheide
- Location: North Brabant, Netherlands and Campine
- Coordinates: 51°20′1″N 5°15′15″E
- Established: 1999
- Governing body: Staatsbosbeheer

Cartierheide is a natural landscape area in the south of the Netherlands in province North Brabant located close to the Belgian border in the natural region called The Campine (local name in Dutch: De Kempen). On the other side of the border is Belgium's first national park, Hoge Kempen.

== History ==
The name is derived from Baron Emile de Cartier Marchiennes who purchased it in 1863, the moor near this location Duizels Hof and used the heath as hunting grounds.

Heide is a Dutch word for heath or heathland which is a shrubland habitat found mainly on low quality acidic soils, and is characterised by open, low growing woody vegetation.

The property was given to the Dutch Society for preservation of nature monuments Natuurmonumenten in 1932 by the son of Baron de Cartier who was also named Emile de Cartier de Marchienne and put under management of Staatsbosbeheer a Dutch organization to control and conserve Dutch nature reserves. There are several touristic sight seeing and walking routes from surrounding villages like Bergeijk, VVV Eersel and protected and maintained by AVN Kempenland
