= Retie =

- Municipality
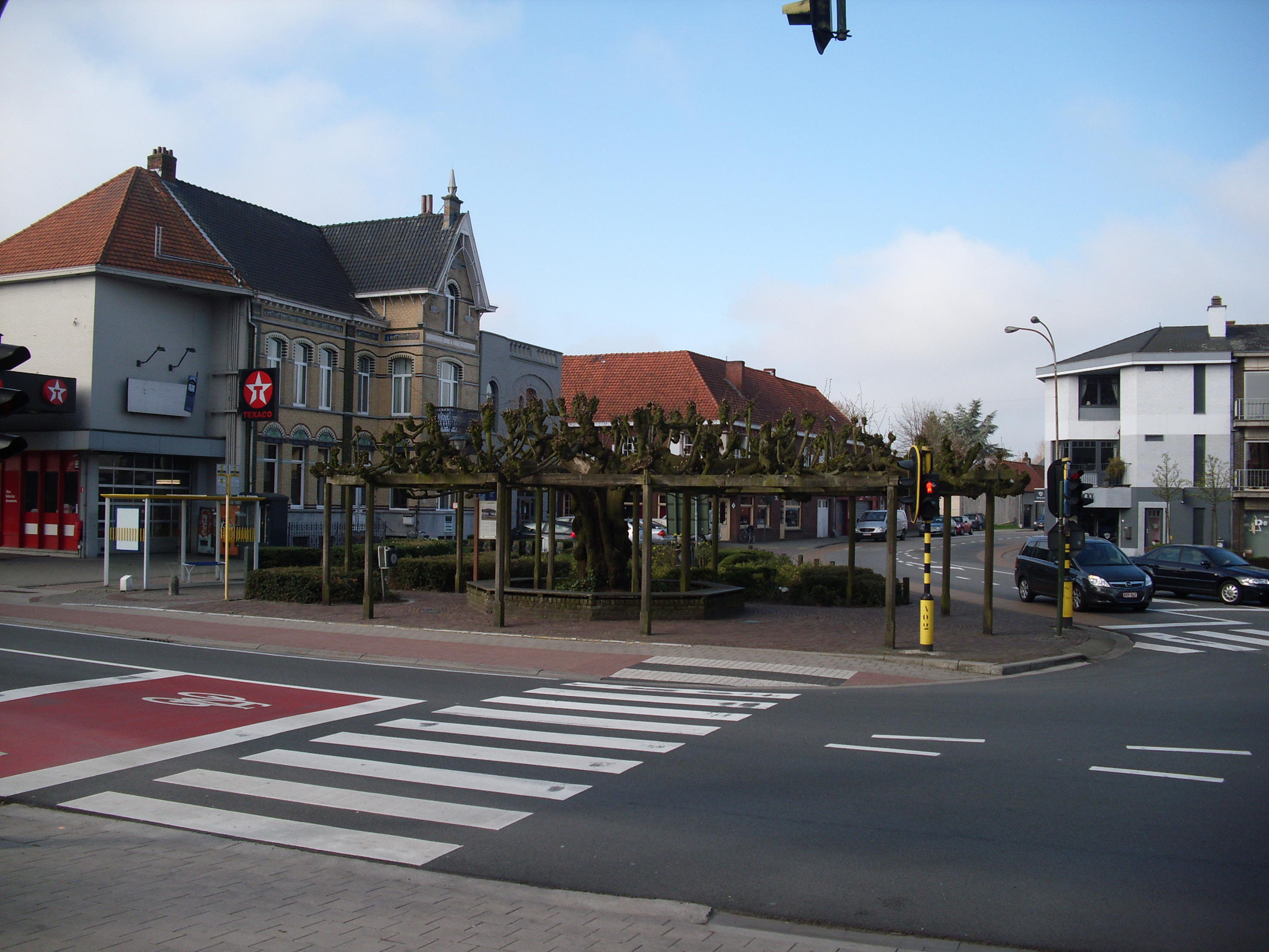

- Flag Coat of arms

- Location of Retie in the province of Antwerp
- Interactive map of Retie
- Location in Belgium
- Coordinates: 51°16′N 05°04′E
- Country: Belgium
- Community: Flemish Community
- Region: Flemish Region
- Province: Antwerp
- Arrondissement: Turnhout

Government
  - Mayor: Patrick Geuens (NR)
  - Governing party: NR (Nieuw Retie)

Area
  - Total: 48.5 km^{2} (18.7 sq mi)

Population (2018-01-01)
  - Total: 11,240
  - Density: 232/km^{2} (600/sq mi)
- Postal codes: 2470
- NIS code: 13036
- Area codes: 014
- Website: www.retie.be

Retie (Dutch pronunciation: [ˈreːti]; French: Réthy, French pronunciation: [ʁeti]) is a municipality located in the Campine region of the province of Antwerp, Belgium. The municipality comprises the town of Retie proper and several hamlets of which Schoonbroek is the largest. In 2021, Retie had a total population of 11,582. The total area is 48.39 km^{2}.

The Francophone name of Retie is Rethy.

== Famous inhabitants ==
- Julien Cools (born 1947), footballer
- Lodewijk de Koninck (1838–1924), writer
- Peter van Hove (?–1793), Friar Minor
- Zefa Raeymaekers, (1922–2017), journalist, poet, politician

== See also ==
- Princes Park, Retie, which was also a location in the TV series Flesh and Bones.
