= Frans Hens =

Belgian painter, draftsman and printmaker

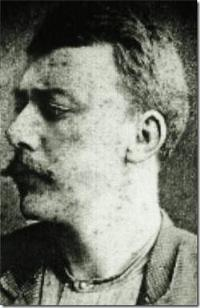
- Hens (before 1900)
- Born: 1 August 1856; Antwerp, Belgium
- Died: 11 April 1928 (aged 71); Antwerp, Belgium
- Education: Royal Academy of Fine Arts of Antwerp
- Occupation: Painter

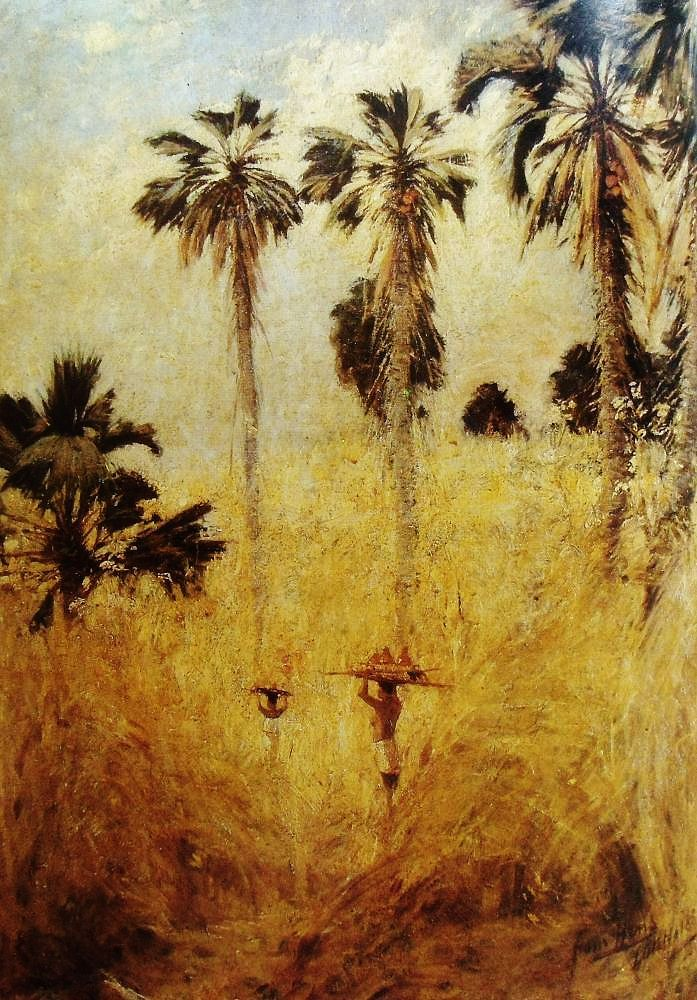
African Landscape (1888)

Frans Hens (1 August 1856, Antwerp – 11 May 1928, Antwerp) was a Belgian Post-Impressionist painter, draftsman and printmaker. He was one of the first European artists to paint in Sub-Saharan Africa.

== Life and work ==
Hens was born in Antwerp and began his studies there under Jacob Jacobs at the Royal Academy of Fine Arts of Antwerp in 1872. He went to America in 1873, but returned the following year to continue his education at the Academy, where he became friends with Theodoor Verstraete and was influenced by exhibitions of post-impressionist art given by the Cercle Artistique of Antwerp.

Although committed to being an artist, his adventurous personality sought other outlets for his creativity, including a stint as an acrobat in a German circus. In 1886, he visited the so-called "Congo Free State" as part of a brief expedition. Finding himself impressed with the artistic potential of Africa, he made another trip there from 1887 to 1888 at his own expense, having been unable to find sponsors. He travelled throughout the Bas-Congo, then sailed up the Congo River to what is now Équateur Province, painting landscapes along the way. Upon his return to Belgium, he held several successful exhibitions, but was later ignored at the Exposition Internationale d'Anvers (1894).

Following this snub, he joined with Eugène Broerman to produce a diorama that would be displayed in a pavilion devoted to the Congo (currently the Royal Museum for Central Africa) at the Brussels International (1897), founding the Société de nom collectif Hens et Broerman for that purpose. The project was never fully realized. Ironically, many of his works are now part of the permanent collection at the museum.

He was a member of several artists' associations, including Pour l'Art and Weest U Zelve (Be Yourself) and was a founding member of De XIII and Kunst van Heden (Art of Today). From 1919 to 1923, he was a teacher at the Royal Academy. Despite the prominence given to his African paintings, most of his work was focused on the Belgian coast, with ships as a recurring theme. He died in his native city of Antwerp, aged 71.

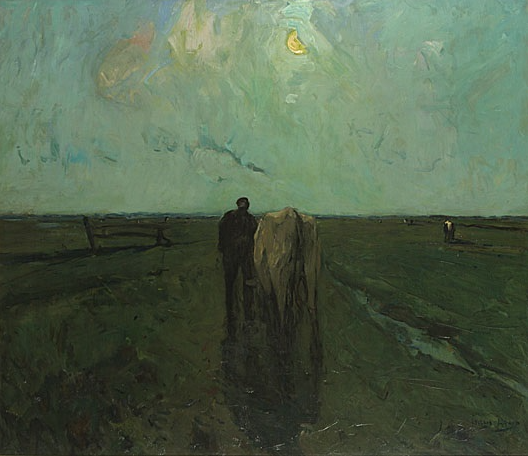
Night Walk (date unknown)
