= Murder of Karel Van Noppen =

1995 assassination in Wechelderzande, Belgium

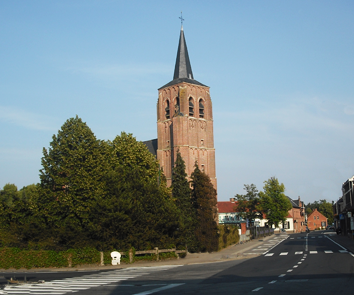
- Modern-day view of Wechelderzande, where Van Noppen was murdered in 1995
- Location: 51°16′N 4°48′E; Wechelderzande, Belgium
- Date: 20 February 1995
- Target: Karel Van Noppen
- Attack type: Assassination
- Deaths: 1 (Van Noppen)
- Perpetrators: Albert Barrez, Carl de Schutter, Germain Daenen, Alex Vercauteren
- Motive: Organised crime

The murder of Karel Van Noppen was a high-profile political scandal that occurred in Belgium in 1995. Karel Van Noppen, a government livestock inspector who had been investigating illegal use of growth hormones by farmers and businessmen, was killed outside his house near Antwerp. A number of people connected with the illegal supply of growth hormones were sentenced in connection with the murder.

Van Noppen's murder was one of a series of highly-publicised scandals in Belgium during the 1990s, including the Agusta scandal, the Dioxin affair, and the Dutroux affair.

== Murder ==
On 20 February 1995, 43-year-old government livestock inspector Karel Van Noppen was shot and killed outside the front door of his home in the village of Wechelderzande in Antwerp Province, Belgium. Van Noppen had been investigating the use of growth hormones on livestock, which has the potential to increase the profit per animal between 10 and 100 percent, though the use of such hormones has been banned by the European Union (and therefore Belgium) since 1989. Organised crime known as the "Hormone Mafia" moved into the business of supplying the illegal hormones to farmers, motivated by the immense profits. This was a particular concern in Belgium, where several government inspectors had been threatened or had attempts made on their lives.

The killing provoked outrage throughout Belgium, with a torchlight procession led by Van Noppen's widow in Flanders, and calls to investigate and better regulate the cattle industry. In 2002, a court sentenced Albert Barrez, Carl de Schutter and Germain Daenen to 25 years each for their roles in the murder, while another man, Alex Vercauteren, received a life sentence without parole.

== In popular culture ==
The 2011 Belgian crime drama Bullhead, directed by Michaël R. Roskam, with Matthias Schoenaerts in a leading role, is loosely based on the incident and the hormone mafia.
