= Reinhilde Decleir =

Flemish actress and director (1948–2022)

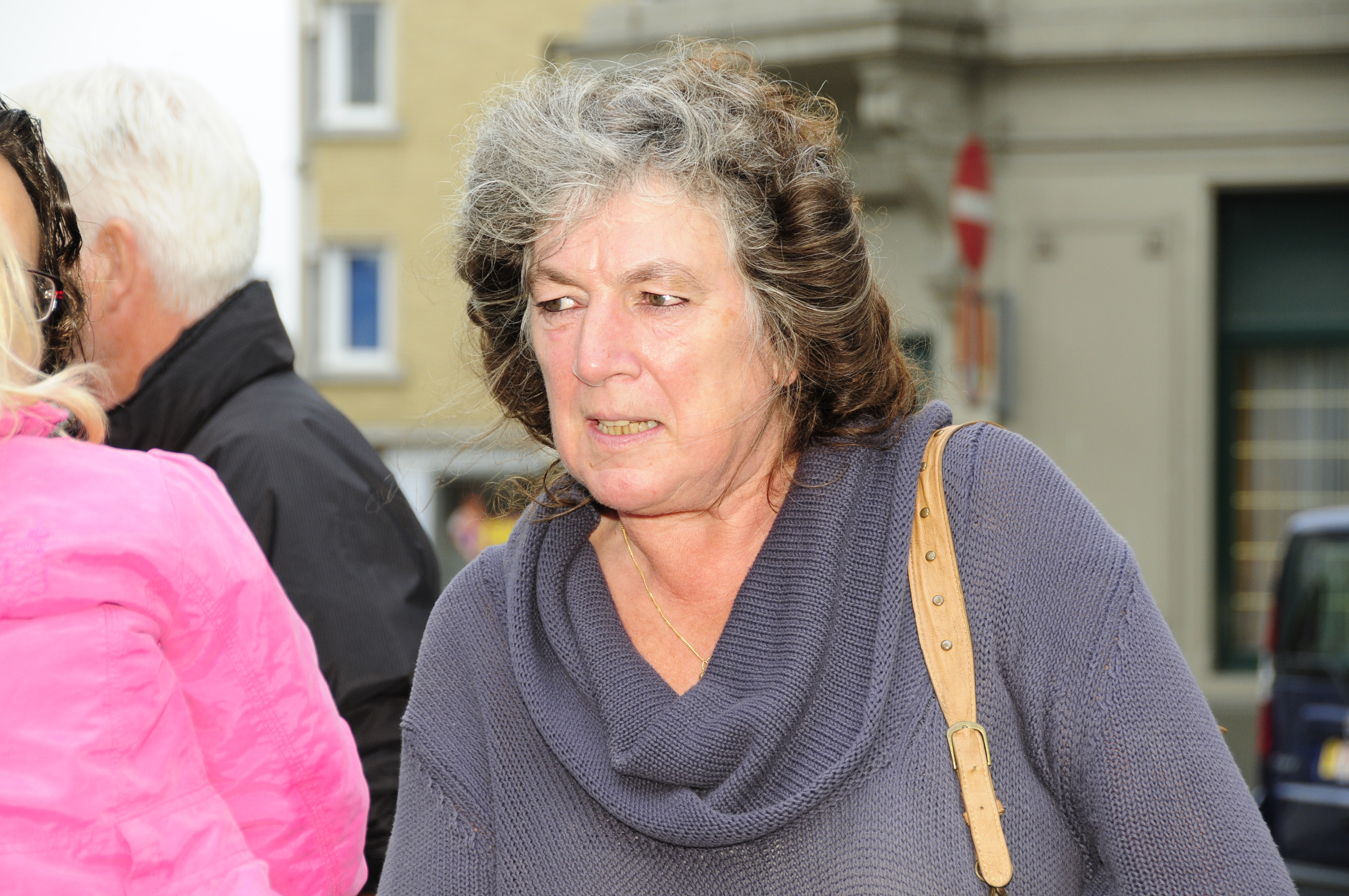
- Born: 16 May 1948; Brasschaat, Flanders, Belgium
- Died: 6 April 2022 (aged 73); Borgerhout, Flanders, Belgium
- Occupation: Actress
- Spouse: Paul Wuyts
- Children: 1

Reinhilde Decleir (16 May 1948 – 6 April 2022) was a Flemish actress and director.

== Career ==
In theater, Decleir played with the Blue Monday Company, the Toneelhuis and Theater Antigone in, among others, En deliver us from evil, In the name of the Father and the Son, Ten war and Nachtlied and directed, among others, Overleie, The Best of Shakespeare, Just of Faust and the Lice Opera. Decleir was a teacher at Studio Herman Teirlinck. In 2007, she founded Tutti Fratelli, a theater company for people who have fewer opportunities in society.

Decleir appeared in a number of Flemish films and TV series. In 2009, she had the lead role as Maria 'moemoe' Vangenechten in the television series Van Vlees en Bloed.

== Personal life and death ==
Decleir was the youngest of five children, including her brothers actor Jan (1946) and Dirk Decleir (1942–1974). She had a son with actor Paul Wuyts (1948–2012).

Decleir died at the age of 73 as a result of euthanasia; at the time of her death, she had cancer.
