= Willem Smits =

Flemish biblical scholar (1704–1770)

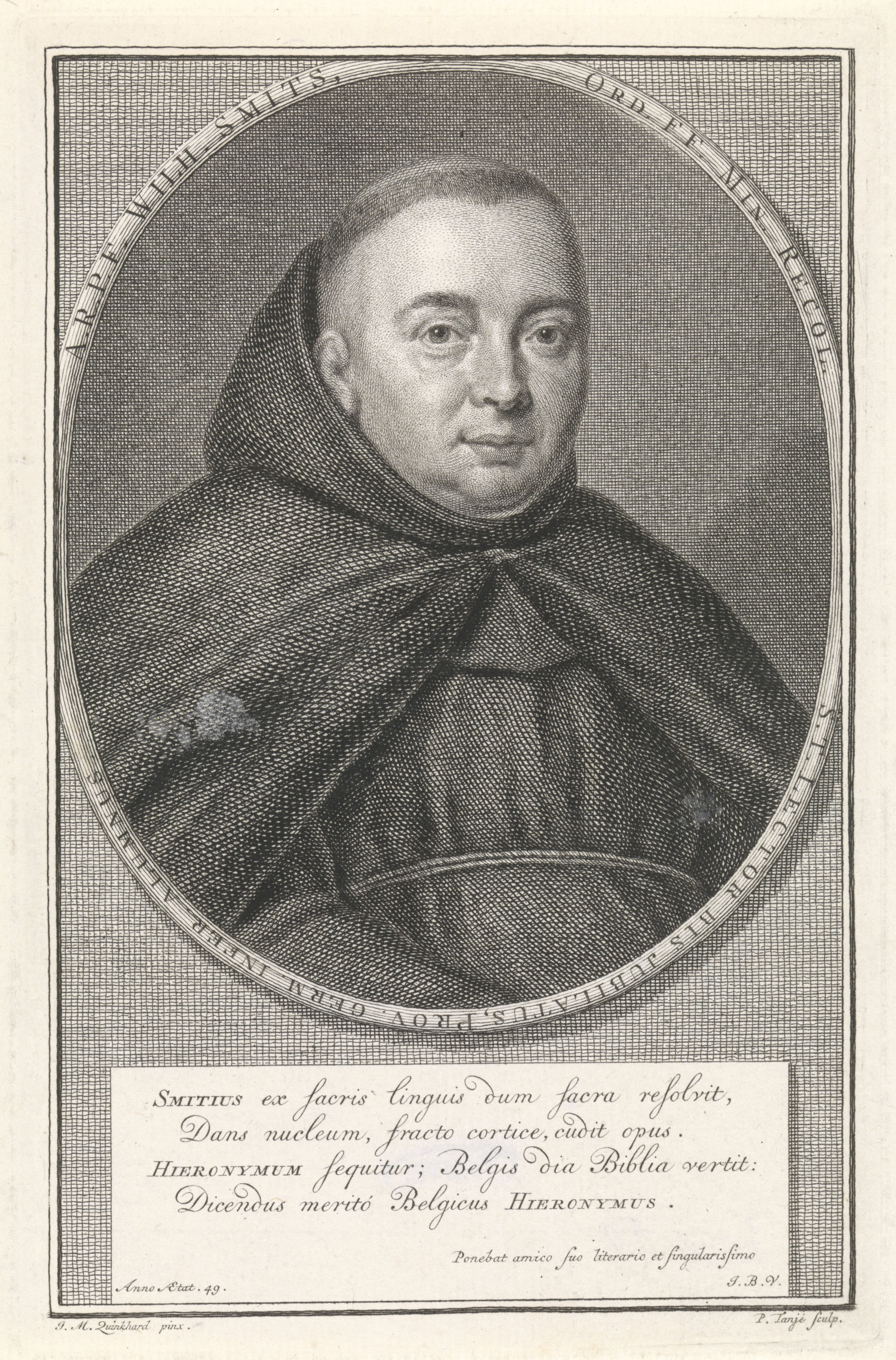
Willem Smits

Willem Smits (1704 – 1 December 1770) was a Dutch Franciscan orientalist and exegete.

== Biography ==
Smits was born in Kevelaer in the Duchy of Guelders. He entered the Order of Friars Minor at the age of eighteen. As a religious, he devoted himself to the study of the Bible and biblical languages, eventually being appointed a lector.

From 1732 to 1744, he published, at Antwerp, several biblical theses dealing with questions of textual criticism and chronology. In one of these, Isagoge Romano-Catholica ad textum hebraeum..., he argues that the Latin Vulgate is substantially a faithful translation of the original Hebrew; and in another, Isagoge Romano-Catholica ad textum graecum vulgo LXX. . ., that the Septuagint is preferable to the actual Hebrew text.

At the request of Thomas Philip Wallrad de Hénin-Liétard d'Alsace, then Archbishop of Mechelen, Smits undertook the translation of the entire Bible into Dutch. The title is: Biblia Sacra Vulgatae editionis, versione belgica, notis grammaticalibus, literalibus, criticis, ... elucidata per FF. Minores Recollectes musae philologico-sacri antwerpiensis. Of this series he lived to finish only thirteen books, which were published, in seventeen volumes, from 1744 to 1767. The work was continued by his collaborator and former pupil, Peter van Hove.

In 1765, Smits was appointed the first prefect of the "Musaeum philologico-sacrum", a Franciscan biblical institute in Antwerp.
