= Jacob Jacobs (artist) =

Belgian painter (1812–1879)

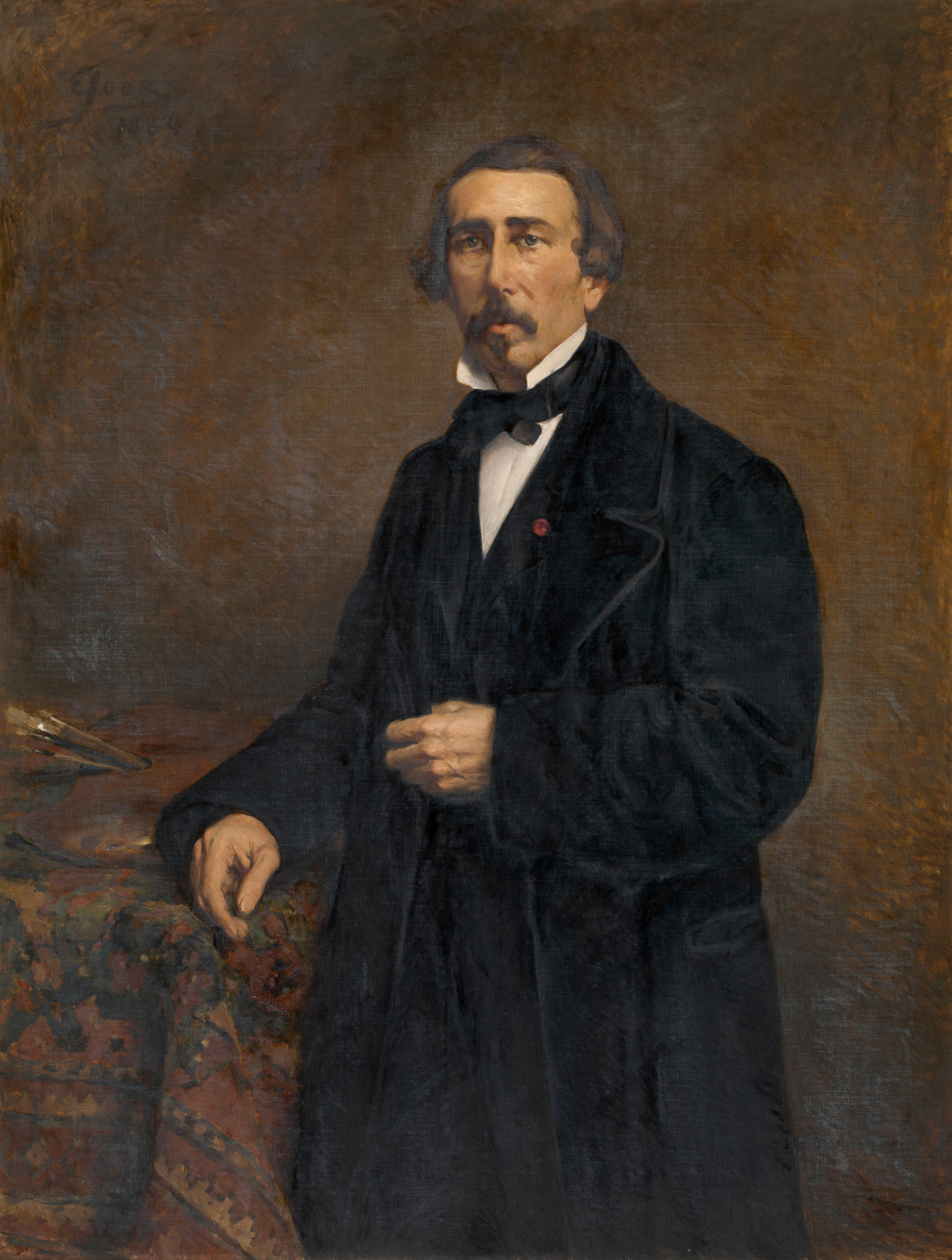
- Jacob Jacobs, posthumous portrait by Eugène Joors, 1884
- Born: 19 May 1812; Antwerp, First French Empire
- Died: 9 December 1879 (aged 67); Antwerp, Belgium
- Education: Royal Academy of Fine Arts (Antwerp)
- Known for: Painter
- Notable work: Landscapes, Oriental themes
- Movement: Orientalist

Jacobus Albertus Michael Jacobs, known as Jacob Jacobs (19 May 1812, Antwerp – 9 December 1879, Antwerp) was a Belgian landscape and seascape painter in the Romantic style, with a preference for northern and "oriental" scenes.

== Life ==
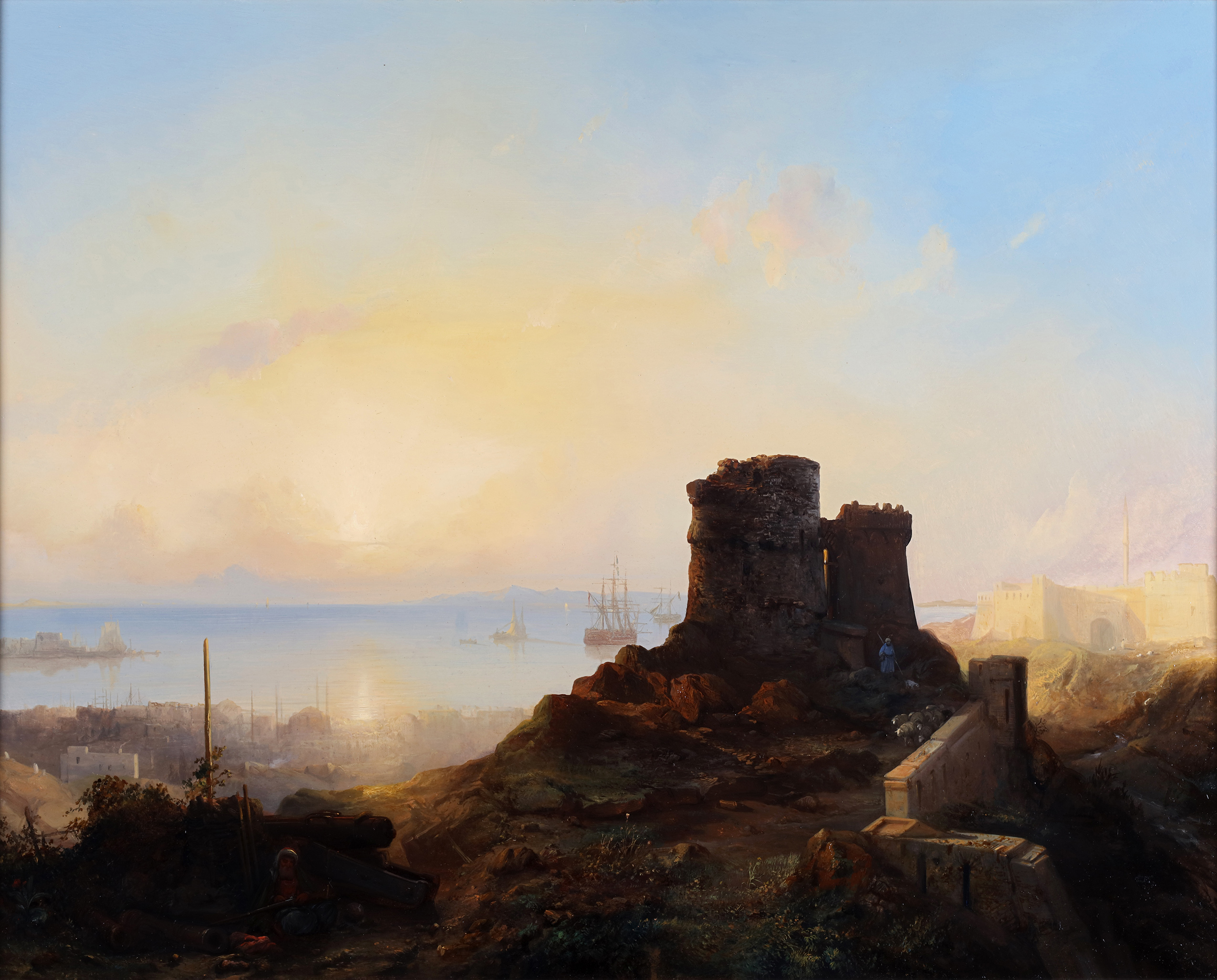
Animated view of Constantinople

On his mother's side of the family, he was related to Beethoven. Although his parents originally intended for him to become a printer, they eventually gave in to his wishes and he was enrolled at the Royal Academy of Fine Arts (Antwerp), where he studied with Gustaf Wappers and Ferdinand de Braekeleer the Elder. He continued his studies in Leuven where he was influenced by the works of Ludolf Bakhuizen and Adriaen van de Velde and chose to focus on maritime scenes. His first exhibitions came in 1833. He took a trip to the North Sea in 1834, and a final study trip through the Netherlands in 1837 produced much material.

Still, he was dissatisfied with what he had seen so, in 1838, he left on a long sea voyage that would take him to Gibraltar, the North African coast, Egypt, the Dardanelles, Istanbul (where he remained for several months), Asiatic Turkey and Rhodes. While in Ankara, he met and befriended his fellow Belgian painter, Florent Mols, and they continued travelling together; sailing down the Nile as far as Nubia. During these travels, he compiled two huge albums of drawings and notes that he would use for inspiration the rest of his life. In 1847, still restless, he toured Northern Germany and, in 1850, Scandinavia.

In 1843, he succeeded Jean-Baptiste De Jonghe as head of the landscape painting classes at the Antwerp Academy, where some of his best-known students were Emile Claus, Frans Hens and Adriaan Jozef Heymans. Two years later, he was one of the many Belgian artists who provided illustrations for the Geschiedenis van België (History of Belgium) by Hendrik Conscience.

== See also ==
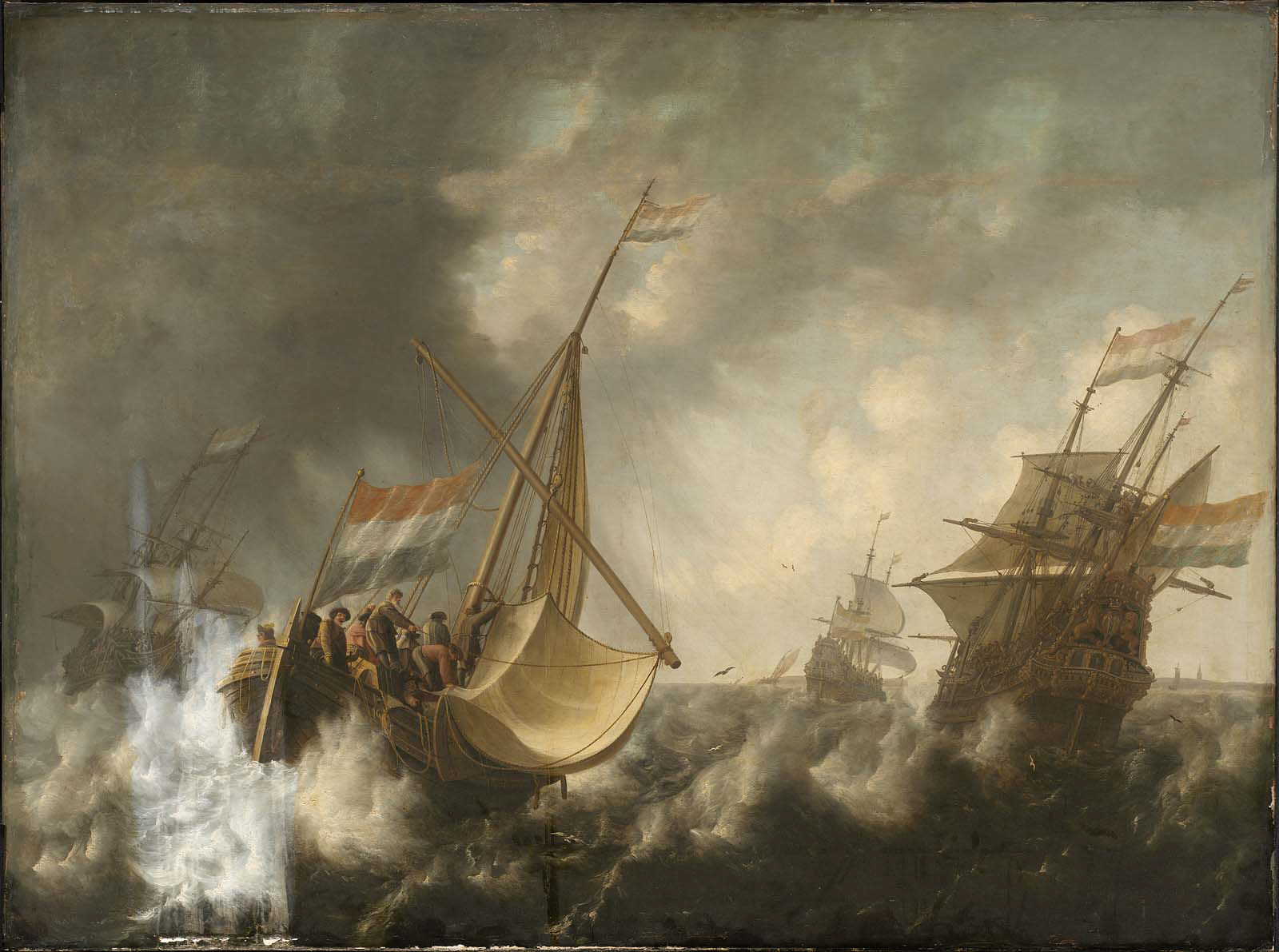
Ships in a Storm

- List of Orientalist artists
- Orientalism
