= Lille, Belgium =

Lille
- Municipality
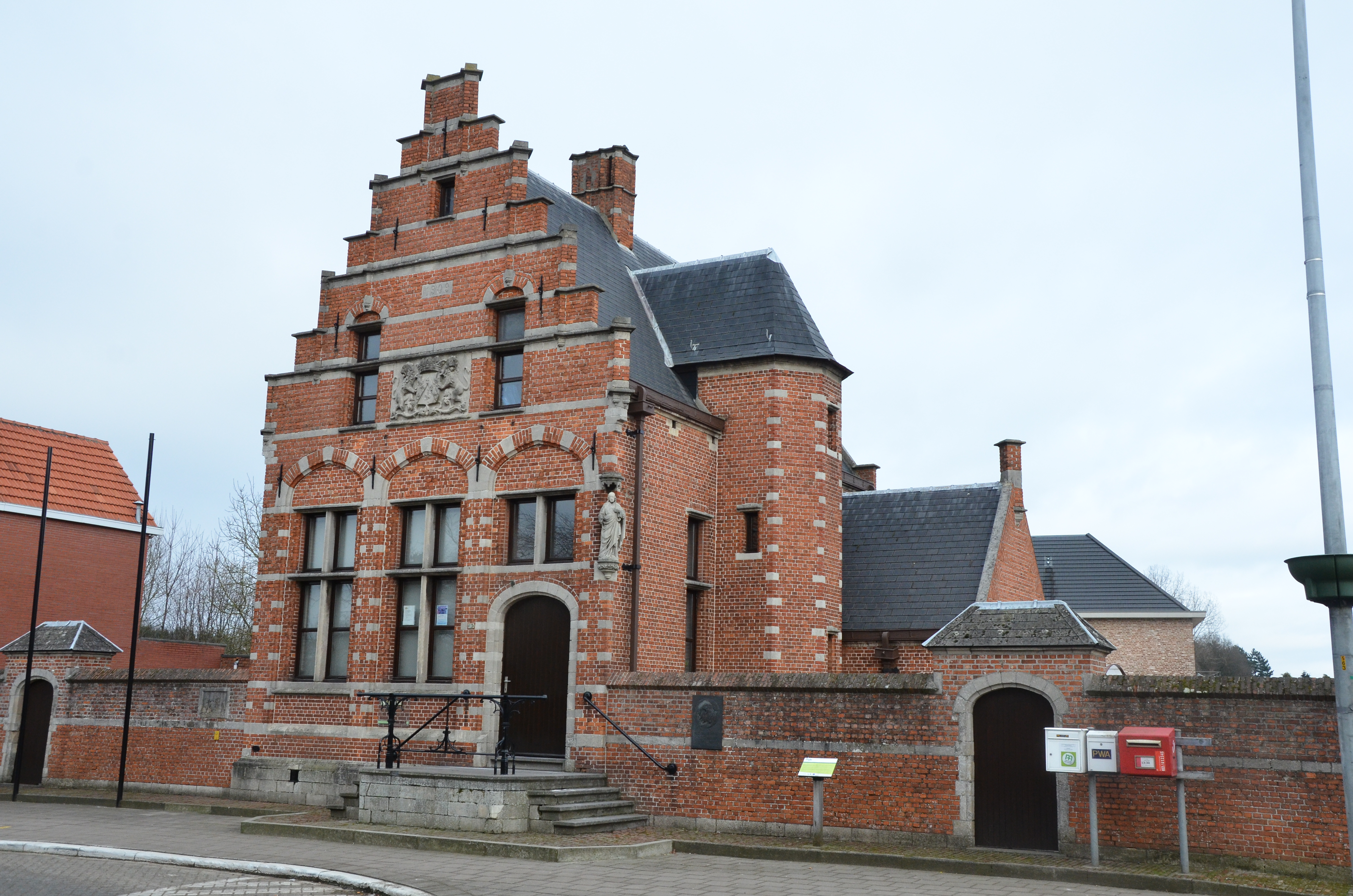

- Flag Coat of arms

- Location of Lille in the Antwerp Province
- Interactive map of Lille
- Location in Belgium
- Coordinates: 51°14′N 04°50′E
- Country: Belgium
- Community: Flemish Community
- Region: Flemish Region
- Province: Antwerp
- Arrondissement: Turnhout

Government
  - Mayor: Marleen Peeters (N-VA)
  - Governing parties: N-VA, Groen

Area
  - Total: 59.62 km^{2} (23.02 sq mi)

Population (2020-01-01)
  - Total: 16,564
  - Density: 277.8/km^{2} (719.6/sq mi)
- Postal codes: 2275
- NIS code: 13019
- Area codes: 014, 03
- Website: www.lille.be

Lille (Dutch pronunciation: [ˈlɪlə]) is a municipality located in the Belgian Antwerp Province. The municipality comprises the towns of Lille, Gierle, Poederlee, and Wechelderzande. In 2021, Lille had a total population of 16,517. The total area is 59.62 km².

The Krawatencross is an annual cyclo-cross race held in Lille in February.

== History ==
The exact date when Lille was formed is not certain. What is certain is that the first mention of Lille as a municipality was in the year 1123.

== Notable inhabitants ==
- Frans Van Giel (1892–1975), painter
- Lords of Poederlée
- Louis Neefs (1937-1980), singer
- Walter Meeuws (1951), football coach
- Paul Herygers (1962), cyclo-cross world champion
- Paul Vermeiren (1963), archer
- Erwin Vervecken (1972), multiple cyclo-cross world champion
- Sanne Cant (1990), twelve-time Belgian cyclo-cross champion
- Wout van Aert (1994), triple cyclo-cross world champion
