= Wechelderzande =

- Town
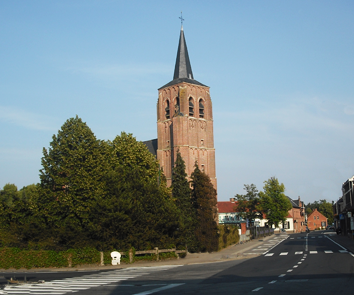
- View of Wechelderzande's church

- Location in Belgium
- Coordinates: 51°16′N 4°46′E
- Country: Belgium
- Region: Flemish Region
- Province: Antwerp
- Municipality: Lille

Area
  - Total: 10.91 km^{2} (4.21 sq mi)

Population (2021)
  - Total: 4,054
  - Density: 371.6/km^{2} (962.4/sq mi)

Wechelderzande is a sub-municipality of Lille, situated in the Campine region of the Antwerp Province in Belgium. It has been part of the municipality of Lille since 1977.

== Overview ==
Wechelderzande was first mentioned in 1182 and belonged the Land van Turnhout. Wechelderzande used to form a heerlijkheid with the town of Vlimmeren. In 1768, the two towns were separated. The centre of Wechelderzande has the inn Den Hert which was built in 1603.

At the end of 19th century beginning of the 20th century it was a favourite site for several painters among them Henry van de Velde. Wechelderzande was an independent municipality until 1977 when it was merged into Lille.

In 1995, Wechelderzande was the site of the high-profile murder of Karel Van Noppen, a government livestock inspector, who was investigating the use of growth hormones on cattle, by organised crime "hormone mafia".

== Gallery ==
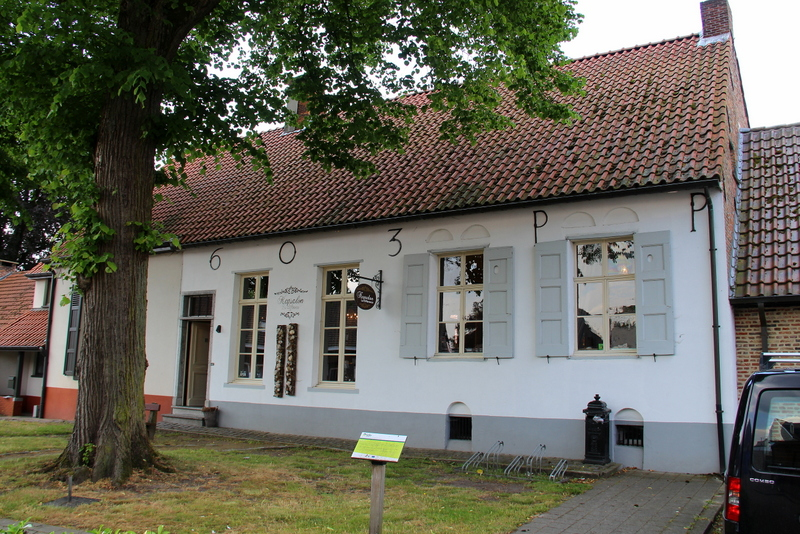
Former inn Den Hart

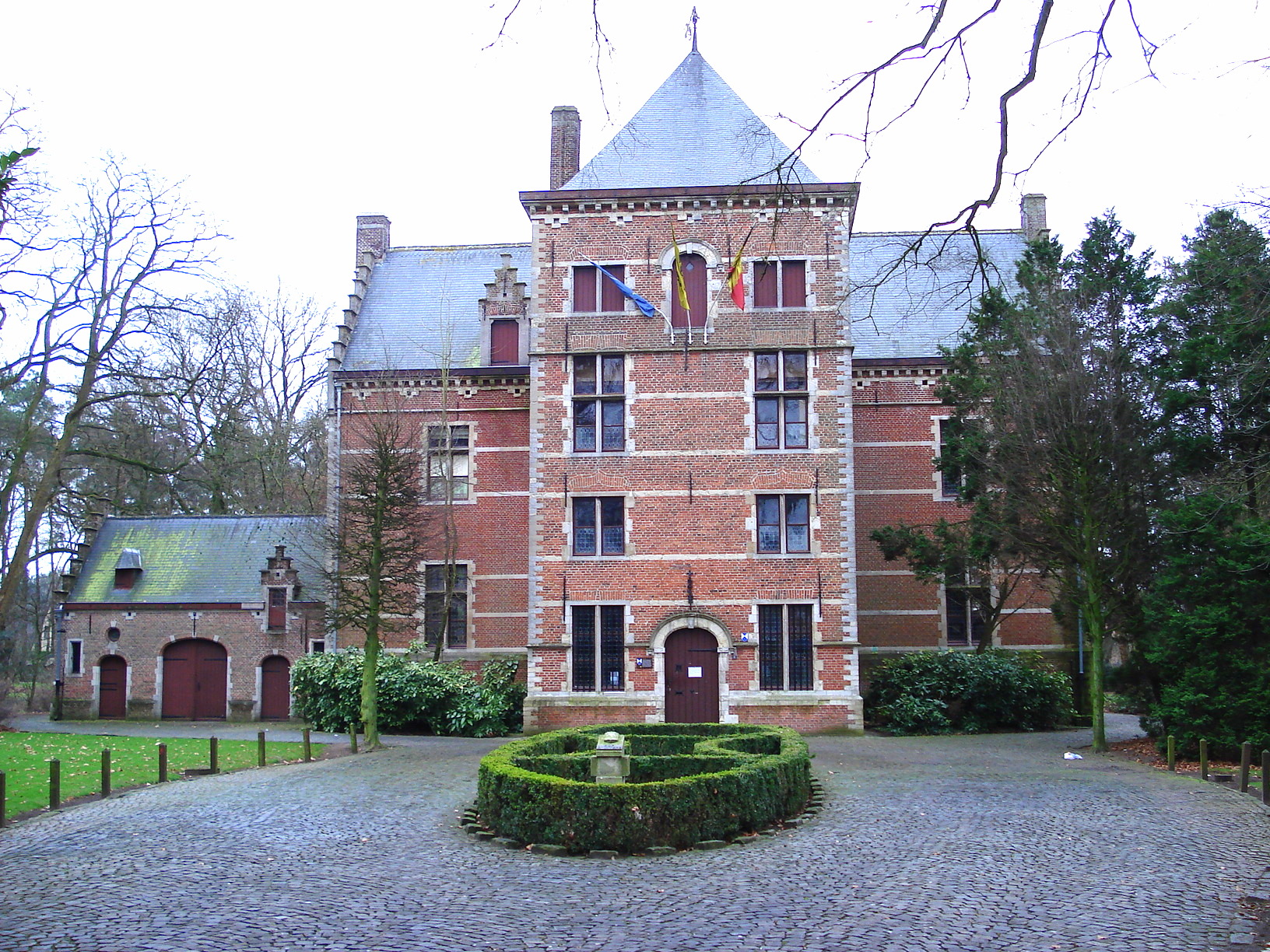
Hof d'Intere

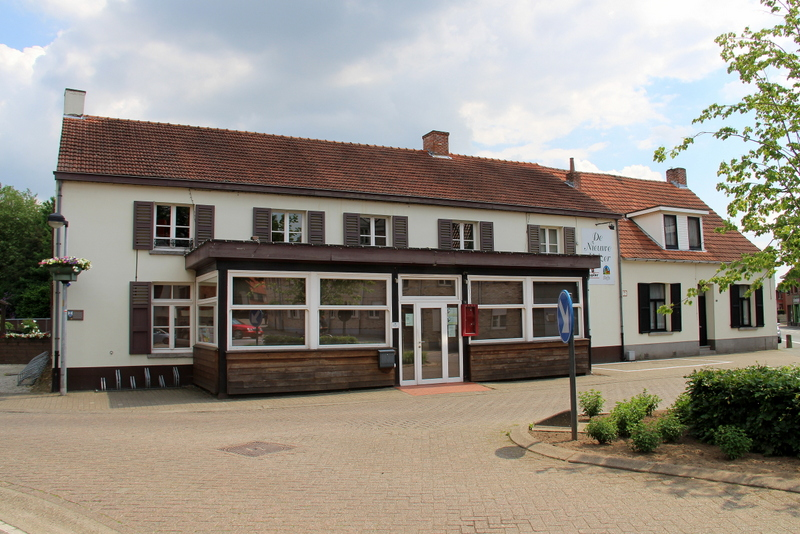
Inn Den Keizer
