= Jan II van Haamstede =

Abt 1321 - 1386

- Lord of Haamstede
- Coat of Arms of the Van Haamstede's
- Predecessor: Floris I van Haamstede
- Successor: Floris III van Haamstede
- Born: 1320
- Died: 1386 (aged 65–66)
- Mother: Goede van Bergen

Jan II van Haamstede (1320 - 24 May 1386) was lord of Haamstede and Haamstede Castle.

== Family ==
Jan II van Haamstede was of the Lords of Haamstede. These were a bastard branch of the Counts of Holland, founded by Witte van Haemstede, natural son of Floris V, Count of Holland. Witte had Floris I van Haamstede, father of Jan II, Arnoud Lord of Moermond, and a Jan van Haamstede who died in 1338.

Floris I was married to Goede van Bergen, daughter of Jan van Bergen of the Van Haerlem family in 1320. They had Jan II van Haamstede in about 1320, and Floris II van Haamstede in about 1325.

== Life ==
=== Succeeds his father ===
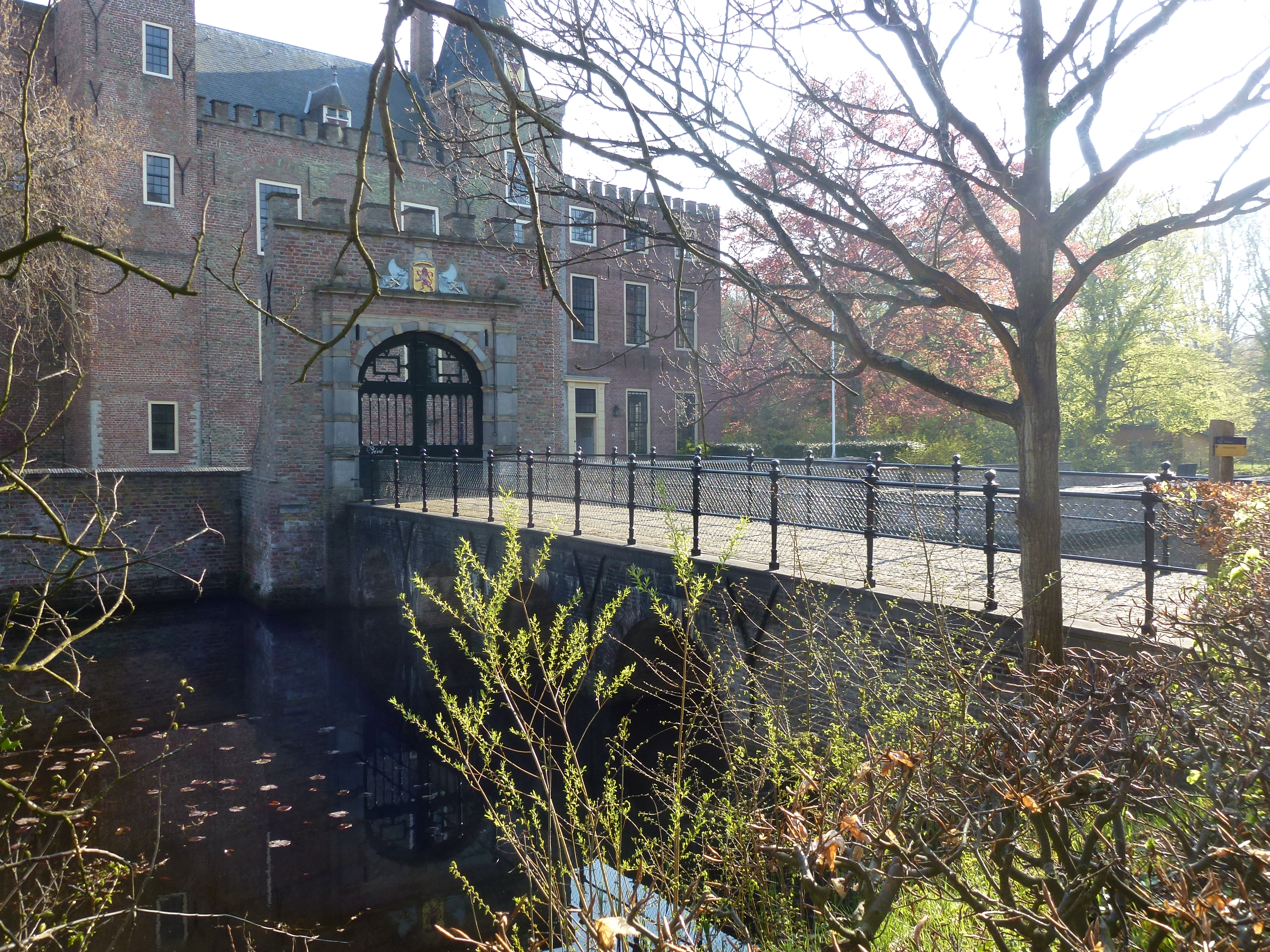
Haamstede Castle

Jan's father Floris I died in the 26 September 1345 Battle of Warns. Jan succeeded as Lord of Haamstede together with his younger brother Floris II. At some time, the inheritance of their father was divided between the brothers.

In the charter of January 1349, by which Margaret II, Countess of Hainaut handed Holland and Zeeland to her son William V, Jan is mentioned in the typical medieval fashion. The listed witnesses are about two dozen knights, followed by just three squires: Dirk III van Wassenaer, Burgrave of Leiden; 'Our nephew' Jan van Haamstede; and Daniël van der Merwede.

=== Conflict with Wolfert van Borselen ===
The person missing in the above charter is Sir Arnoud van Haamstede Lord of Moermond, Jan's uncle. As a knight he would have been listed, but he had been killed in a fight with the Van Borselen clan. Wolfert III van Borselen was the probable culprit. On the Van Borselen side, Wolfert the Bastard had been killed in the conflict.

=== The Hook and Cod Wars ===
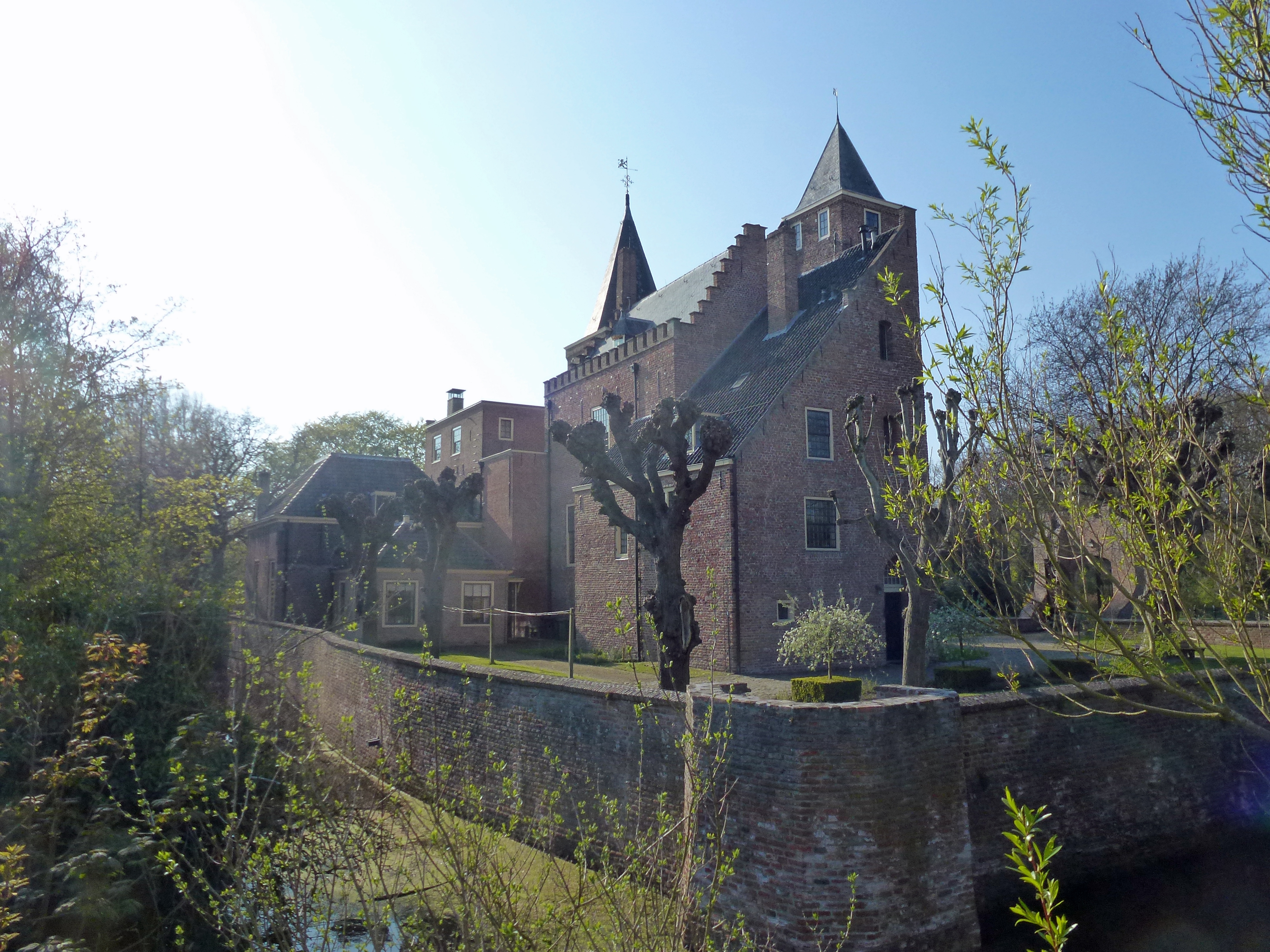
Haamstede, the central part is the old keep

The Hook and Cod wars were fought between the Hook party, led by Margaret of Hainaut and the Cod party led by her son William. They started in earnest in August 1350, when Delft and most of the Holland cities rebelled against Margaret of Hainaut. The only major cities that held Margaret's side were Dordrecht, and in Zeeland: Zierikzee. At the time Zierikzee, on the island Schouwen rivalled Middelburg. Jan's castle Haamstede Castle was on the same island. Schouwen was a real powerbase for Margaret. On 21 January 1351 Jan and Floris van Haamstede were in Zierikzee and promised to keep Margaret's side.

In January 1351 both the Van Borselen clan and allies and the Van Haamstede family and allies agreed to let Margaret judge the killings of Arnoud van Haamstede and Wolfert the Bastard. On 6 February 1351 she judged the matter. The judgement was in favor of Jan II van Haamstede and his allies. The Van Borselen side had to pay 12,000 pound, the Van Haamstede side 2,000. Jan and Floris were mentioned as: 'Jan van Haamstede and Floris van Haamstede our nephews'. Some others on their side were Sir Roelof die Coc and Sir Rase van Kruiningen.

Shortly after the verdict, the Van Borselen's and Middelburg rebelled, and joined the Cod side. Later in 1351 Margaret's forces then won the Battle of Veere, but lost the Battle of Zwartewaal. Jan's brother Floris fought at Zwartewaal, and was subsequently killed. It is quite possible that Jan was also present in this battle.

After Margaret had lost Zeeland, Jan's estate was sequestered, and Jan banished.

=== Reinstated ===
Jan was included in the peace that William made with Margaret, but had to pay amends.

When Albert became regent of Holland, the tide turned for Jan. On 10 November 1358 Count Albert granted Jan all the lands of Jan van Zuurmond, which used to be that of his brother Floris van Haamstede.

In December 1368 Count Albert made a favorable provision for Jan and his wife after the death of her father Rase van Kruiningen. Out of the dowry of Jan's wife, he granted 2,500 gemets (comparable to acres) of land to their children after their death. In exchange Jan had to pay 2,000 shields.

In 1377 Jan was a witness to the marriage contract between Albert's daughter Catharina and the Duke of Guelders. The witnesses for Zeeland were listed as: Johannes, Dominus de Haemsteden; Wolfardus de Borsele, Dominus de Veer; Francus de Borsele Dominus de Sinte Martensdyck, and lower ranking men.

In 1379 Jan was present at a reconciliation in Middelburg. Here he was listed behind the Lord of Veere.

In May 1386 his son Floris is mentioned, which might indicate that Jan has passed away by 1386.

== Marriage and offspring ==
Jan II was married to a daughter of Rase van Kruiningen.

- Floris III van Haamstede (1370-1431)
