= Moermond Castle =

- Slot Moermond
- Renesse, the Netherlands
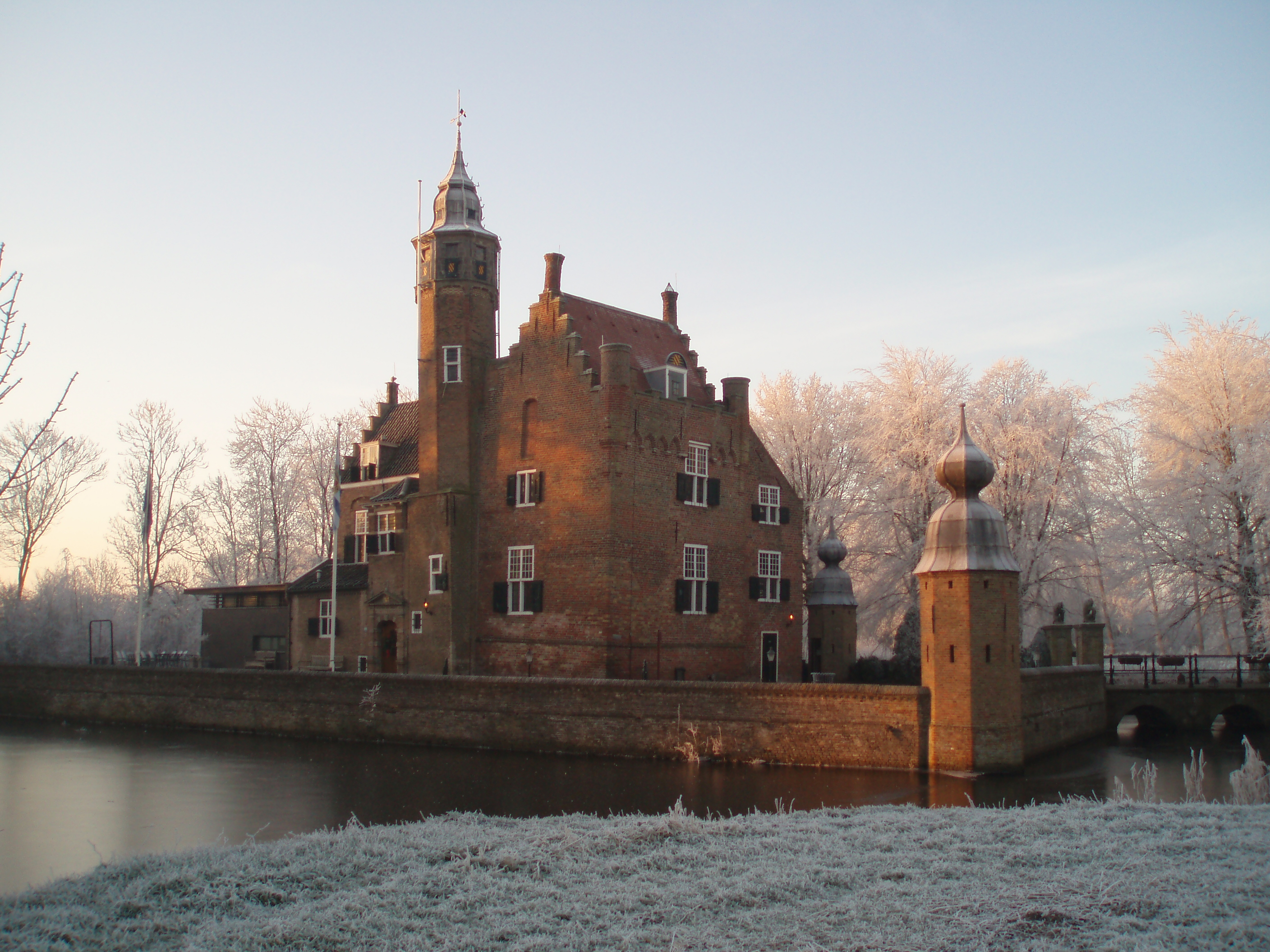
- Moermond Castle, Winter 2007

Site information
- Type: Water castle
- Open to the public: Yes, as a restaurant

Location
- The Netherlands
- Location within Zeeland
- Coordinates: 51.733687°N 3.786454°E

Site history
- Built: 13th, 15th, 16th century
- Materials: brick
- Events: Siege of 1297

Moermond Castle is a castle in Renesse on Schouwen-Duiveland.

== Castle Characteristics ==
=== The first castle ===
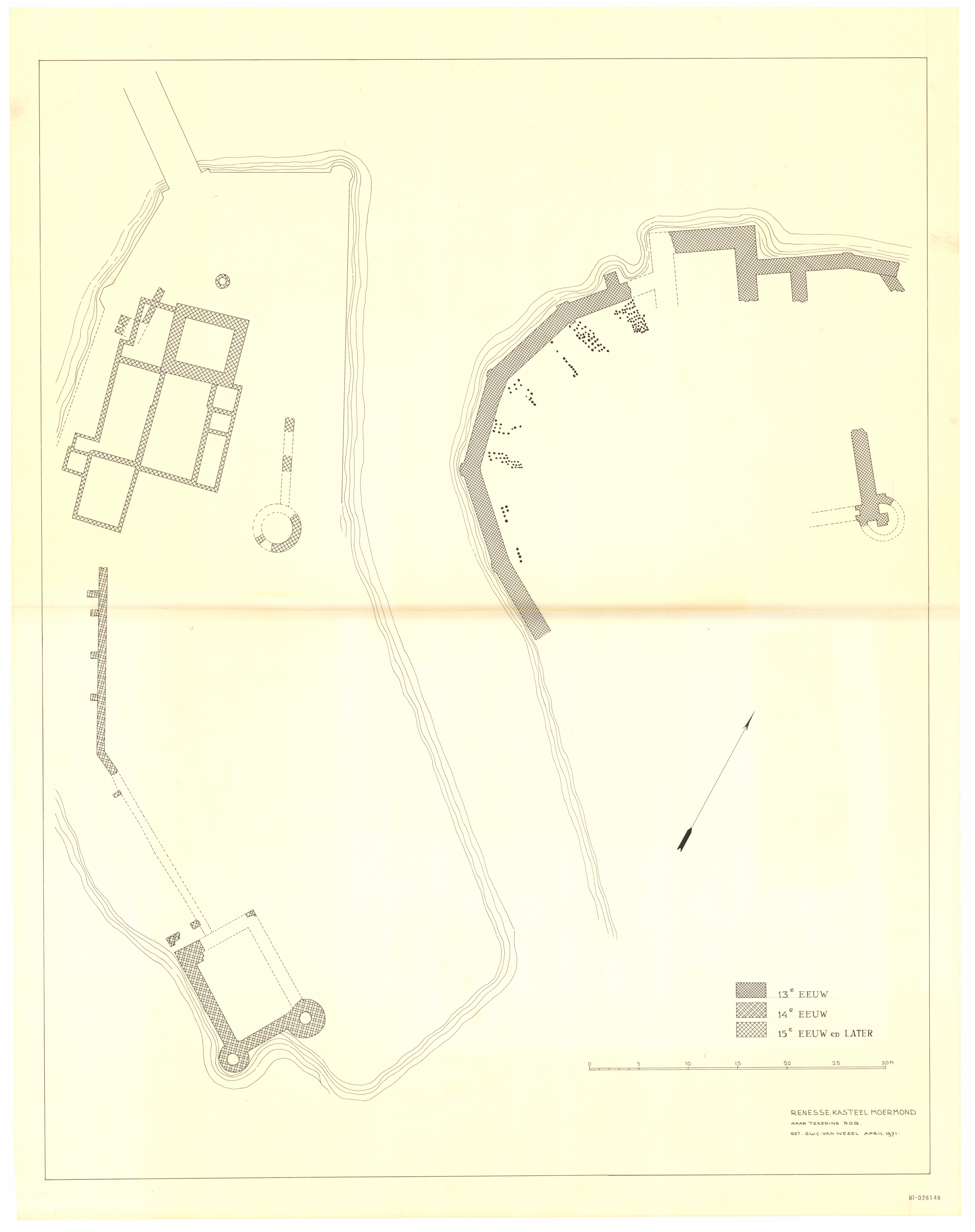
Plan with excavations

The first castle was built northeast of the current castle. It was a water castle that was destroyed in about 1297. The first castle was never seen till it was rediscovered during the 1956 excavations.

This first castle was polygonal. Judging from the estimated one third that was found in the 1950s, it formed a rough circle. The wall was about 1.60 m wide, and has small outward protrusions on the corners. On the northwest side a square tower was part of the wall. Its walls were 2.25 m thick. As this tower interrupts the line of the wall, one might suppose that it was a gatehouse, like that of Egmond Castle.

The parts that were uncovered allowed archaeologists to calculate that the diameter of the circle would have been about 60 m. On the inside of the wall, clusters of foundation piles were found at regular intervals, see plan with excavations. Judging from the place and form of the clusters, these supported the foundation feet of buttresses, which supported a chemin de ronde. The piles stood in the peat moer ground, which explains the name Moermont.

In the center of the terrain, two sides of a square building were uncovered. On its corner were vestiges of a stair tower. The configuration of the first castle is reminiscent of the polygonal Burcht of Voorne, which was built somewhat later. Even so, there are no indications that Moermond was a Motte-and-bailey castle like Voorne.

After the excavations, the walls of the first castle were consolidated. They can now be seen at the edge of the other side of one of the current Moermond castle's moats.

=== The Second castle ===
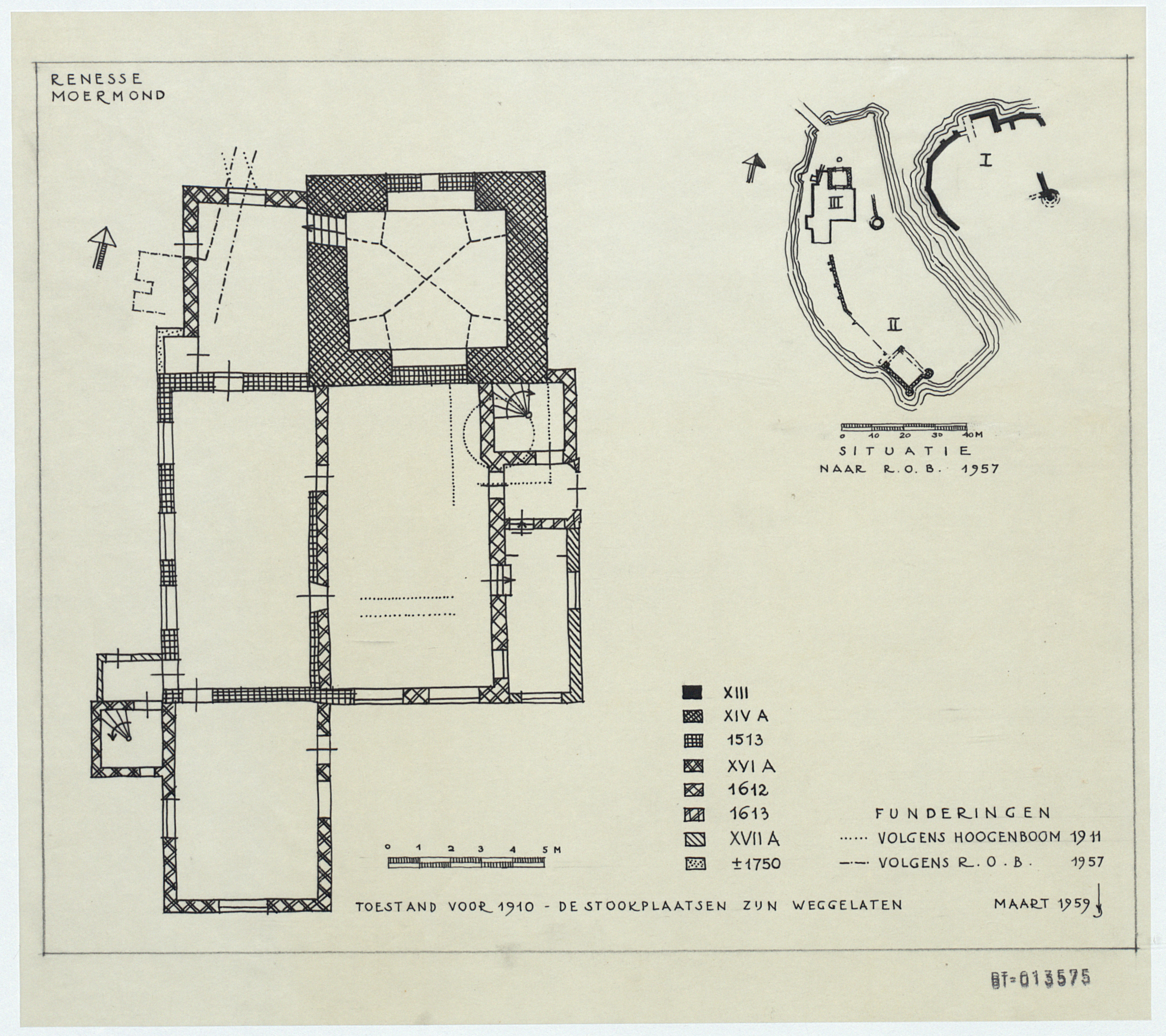
Detailed construction history

Canon 9, Moermond

The second castle stood south of the current castle on the same island. Its core was a tower house measuring 6 by 10 m on the inside. On the southeast side it had two round towers. On its western corner was a connected privy tower with waste funnel. This tower house dated from before 1339. The brick used in this building was repurposed brick from the first castle.

From this tower house, a wall led to the northwest. Its connection to the current castle could not be clearly established in the 1950s. Another question that was not answered at the time was the location of the wall that one might suppose to have been located to the east of the wall that was found.

At the northern edge of the second castle there was a gatehouse. It was built from re-used brick of the first castle. These bricks measured 27.5-28.5 * 13.5-14.5 * 6.5–8 cm. When the third castle was built, this medieval gatehouse became its core. It led to the supposition that the current castle was a tower house that succeeded the first castle. A part of this misconception was solved when in 1957 the second castle was discovered. Later, the supposed tower house was investigated.

=== The third and current castle ===
The current castle was built in 1513 by changing the gatehouse of the second castle. This date is known from an inscription above the fireplace of the castle. It had the arms of the new owners, and the statement that it was the third time the castle was newly built. The first change was to close the gate openings on both sides. Next, the basement was vaulted, see picture.

A square wing was then added on the southwest of the former gatehouse, also from repurposed brick. Somewhat later, this was expanded to the north and south. This was also when the southwest stair house was built, that is now topped with a shed roof. Some ceiling beams from the early 16th century still remain.

In the 17th century, the octagonal stair tower and east wing were built in 1612. This created an inner courtyard, where the façade on the western side was also changed. The small renaissance gate south of it dates from 1613. Still somewhat later, the low annex southeast of it was built.

The castle was repaired in 1751. In 1911 the castle was restored based on the plans of J. Hoogenboom. After the damage caused by the North Sea flood of 1953, the castle was again restored in 1958–1960. This was also when the three decorative little towers on the low wall around the castle were restored based on old pictures.

The orangery was built in about 1840. The neoclassical façade remains.

== History ==
=== Van Renesse ===
The Lords of Renesse Heren van Renesse were might have been a younger branch of the Counts of Holland. Costijn van Zierikzee was the first lord of Renesse who can be clearly verified. In 1229 he exchanged his lands in Zierikzee for Floris IV, Count of Holland's lands in the western part of Schouwen with the exception of Burgh and Haamstede. Shortly after 1229 the round water castle at Moermond was built by order of Costijn. In 1244 Count William II of Holland visited Moermond Castle, where he issued a charter: 'in domini Costini militis domo apud Rietnesse'.

Costijn van Zierikzee / Renesse had at least two sons: Jan (c. 1250 - c. 1294) and Costijn. Jan rebelled against Holland. In 1289 he paid homage for Moermond Castle to Guy, Count of Flanders. In 1291 he was reconciled with Floris V, Count of Holland. Jan had: John III, Lord of Renesse (1268–1304), Hendrik and Costijn. Costijn, brother of the Jan who died in 1294, had a son called Jan van Haamstede, who died childless in 1295. It led to Haamstede Castle coming to the unrelated Witte van Haemstede in 1299.

John III came into conflict with Wolfert I van Borselen (c. 1245–1299). It led to the Siege of Moermond Castle in 1297. Melis Stoke (c. 1235 – c. 1305) would write:

Dus belachmen Moermond.
Men lachter voer ene stont,
Eer ment ghewan end sijt opgaven.
Al had ghecost vele haven,
Men most breken alt male,
Van boven neder toten dale.

Translation:

Thus Moermond was besieged.
One camped before it for some time,
Before it surrendered,
The siege cost a lot of goods,
One had to demolish everything,
From high to low.

After Wolfert I and John I, Count of Holland both died in 1299, Jan returned to Zeeland. In 1301 he rebelled against John II, Count of Holland, and in 1303 he joined the Flemish invasion of Holland and Utrecht. In 1304 he drowned while crossing the River Lek. Jan's defeat led to the Van Renesse family losing control of Schouwen. In 1312 Hendrik and Costijn van Renesse gave their lands in Schouwen / Renesse to William III of Holland in exchange for the count's lands in West Baarland, Bakendorp and Oudelande.

=== Van Haamstede ===
In 1313 Witte van Haemstede (c. 1281–1321) got all the lands that used to belong to Jan III van Renesse and his brothers. He also got Haamstede, which had belonged to the Jan III's nephew, though he might have gotten Haamstede earlier (above). Witte thus reunited some of the domains that had belonged to Costijn van Zierikzee / Renesse. To all appearances Witte would have found an intact residence at Haamstede Castle, and only ruins at Renesse / Moermond. Witte changed his name to Van Haamstede and made it his residence.

Witte had three sons: Floris I van Haamstede, Arnoud van Haamstede and Jan van Haamstede. In 1335 Witte's inheritance was split between on one side Floris and Jan, and on the other side Arnoud. Arnoud van Haamstede built the second Moermond Castle. Arnoud was killed somewhere between 1346 and 1349. The Van Haamstede's were firmly on the Hook side during the first years of the Hook and Cod wars. In 1351–1352 the Hook side lost the first round of these wars, which might have led to damage at Moermond Castle.

Arnoud's daughter Margaret was still single in early 1351. She later married the Cod Lord Wouter van Heemskerk. By this, she was again on the losing side when Wouter's Marquette Castle was besieged and taken in 1358–1359. It is very well possible that Moermond Castle was also damaged at this time. In 1360 Margaret agreed to pay 7,000 shields to reconcile her husband with the count of Holland.

In April 1361 Wouter van Heemskerk and Margaret of Moermond were allowed to make a polder in an area between Schouwen and Noord-Beveland. Wouter van Heemskerk died childless in 1380. To all appearances, Moermont then reverted to the main branch of the Van Haamstede's. In 1396 an Arnout van Moermont ende van Haemstede is mentioned. By 1500 Moermont Castle had become ruinous.

=== Van Serooskerke ===
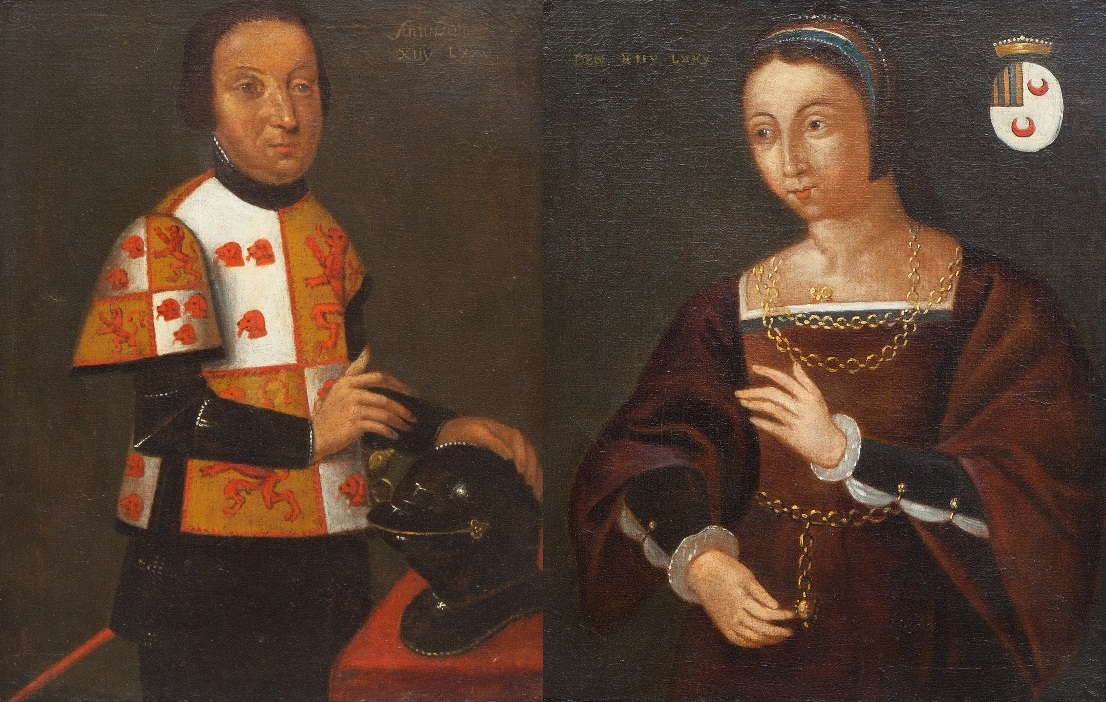
Jacob van Serooskerke and Jacoba van den Eynde

Pieter van Tuyll Hugenzone (1430-1492) became Lord of Welland and Serooskerke in 1483. He then changed his name to Van Serooskerke. His son Jacob was a squire in 1500. He acquired Moermont, Stavenisse and Westkerke. In 1500 he married Jacqueline van den Eynde. In 1513 Jacob van Serooskerke turned the former gatehouse of the second castle into a country house.

Jeronimus van Serooskerke (1500-1571) was the second Van Serooskerke owner of Moermond. He became burgrave of Zeeland in 1547, lieutenant admiral, and governor of Bergen op Zoom. He built Stavenisse Castle in 1653, so it's likely that from that time onward, Moermond was no longer the main residence of the family. Philibert van Serooskerke (1537-1579) was lord of Serooskerke, Popkensburg, Moermond and Stavenisse. He was also burgrave of Zeeland and governor of Bergen op Zoom.

Hendrik van Tuyll van Serooskerke (1574-1627) was probably the last Van Serooskerke to own Moermond Castle. Hendrik was mayor of Tholen, deputy to the States General, and special envoy to England. In 1620 he was lord of Stavenisse, Tienhoven, and Rijnhuizen. In 1593 Caesar Porquin was mentioned as owner, he died in 1612.

=== Van Zuidland and Van Wijngaarden ===
In 1612 Iman van Zuidland (1585-1638), later mayor of Zierikzee, bought Moermont. Iman made many changes that gave the castle its current outlook of a 16-17th century mansion. Catharina van Zuidland, Iman's only child, married Daniël Oem van Wijngaarden in 1634.

Daniël Oem van Wijngaarden (c. 1626–1688) was Baron of Wijngaarden, president of the Hof van Holland, member of the knighthood of Holland, member of the States General etc. Their second daughter Jacoba lady of Moermond died unmarried.

=== Kemp ===
Next came Pieter Kemp, Lord of Bommenede, Moermond and Zuidland. He married Anthonia Hoffer. Their daughter brought Moermond to Mr. van Schuilenburgh. In 1751 Pieter van Schuilenburgh (1714-1764) made large renovations, 'so that it could again accommodate a gentleman and his company'. He was married to the miniature portrait artist Maria Machteld van Sypesteyn (1724-1774), who signed as Schuylenburch a Moermont.

In 1788 Cornelis Ascanius van Sijpesteyn was owner of Moermont. After the September 1787 Prussian invasion of Holland, Moermont was plundered by an Orangist mob.

=== Van IJsselstein and Van Adrichem ===
Later Moermond Castle was bought by the Van IJsselstein family, and the Van Adrichem family. In 1871 it was bought by mr. C. van der Lek de Clerq, notary in Zierikzee and member of the Dutch senate. In 1908 the then owner had structural renovations started by the architect Joh. Hoogenboom. These were finished in early 1911. The renovation was characterized by not being an attempt to return Moermont to e.g. its 1513 or 1613 state.

=== Vriezendorp ===
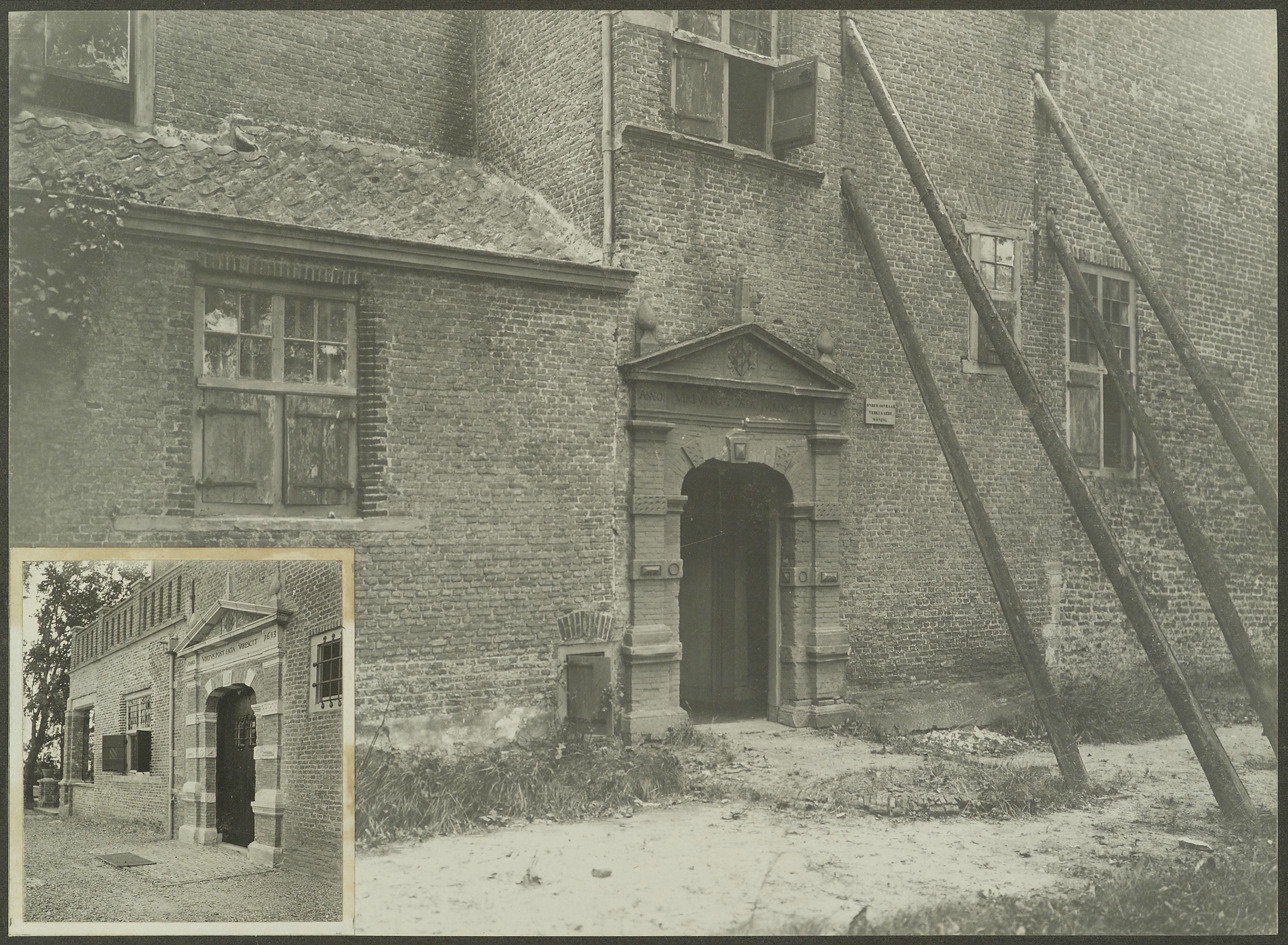
1911 renovation

In 1910 Mr. J.J. Vriesendorp from Dordrecht bought Moermond Castle from Mr. J.F van der Lek de Clerq. In February 1911 a more final restoration was tendered and awarded for 9,506 guilders. In August 1917 an aerial bombardment just missed the castle, with some bombs landing in the garden.

Vriesendorp was responsible for (re?)creating the wall around the moat. He stored a large collection of porcelain and arms at the castle.

On 10 December 1944 there was a gruesome execution of 10 young men in the lawn of Moermond Castle. They had tried to evade forced labor in Germany, but were caught. They were then executed by hanging, as though they were criminals. The local population was forced to witness the execution, and the bodies were left to hang for 36 hours. The affair is known as 'The Ten of Renesse'. A monument stands near the entrance of the castle grounds.

=== The North Sea flood of 1953 ===
The 31 January North Sea flood of 1953 also inundated Schouwen. From the tower window Jacob Vriesendorp saw the water rushing towards the castle. He was able to save some small art work and silver by bringing it upstairs, but all the furniture, and even the paintings could not be saved. The sea water then ruined everything that was left, even the doors and woodwork, which were flooded with salt water for up to two meters on a daily basis.

=== Moermond Castle Foundation ===
In 1954 the Stichting Slot Moermond (Moermond Castle foundation) was founded. Thanks to a 172,000 guilders gift from Sweden, the castle was restored.

=== 1956 Renovation ===
In November 1956 the remnants of the first Moermont Castle were found, see above. In February 1957 the remnants of the second castle were discovered.

=== Outward Bound ===
The Outward Bound School

In 1960 the Dutch branch of Outward Bound decided to found a school at Moermond Castle. This was supported by major Dutch companies, and a gift from the Bernard Van Leer Foundation. Cost was 300 guilders per person for a course of one month. The Outward Bound School took a 10-year lease on Moermond Castle. In 1961 Lieutenant-Colonel J.H. Ranst, a commando officer became headmaster of the school.

At first the very physical training paid by major companies raised suspicion, especially on the left and Christian side. During the 1960s program at Moermond evolved from character‐training to personal growth and self‐discovery. While the groups were first led by sports instructors, these were replaced by social workers during the late 1960s. In 1971, Outward Bound left Moermond, because the location cost them 50,000 a year.

=== Buitencentrum Moermond ===
In 1972 the foundations for harbor schooling in Amsterdam and Rotterdam, and three transport labor unions, founded the Buitencentrum Moermond foundation, which then leased Moermont Castle. They wanted to use it for schooling young port workers, training, and conferences. The castle was then refurbished for this purpose. The orangery was also taken in use, and a separate sleeping accommodation was built. The schooling of labor union men took place in boarding school style. The employer organizations also used Moermond for their activities. The activities at Moermond were paid by a social foundation Sociaal Fonds, which got less money during the 1970s. In 1977 the labor unions then decided to quit Moermond.

=== The Oosterscheldekering (1979-1986) ===
In 1979 Moermond Castle was rented for workers that constructed the Oosterscheldekering. During the construction of the dam, Moermond was used by engineers to make plans. Moermond was also used to receive the many guests that visited the Delta Works. This period ended in late 1986.

=== Congrescentrum Slot Moermond ===
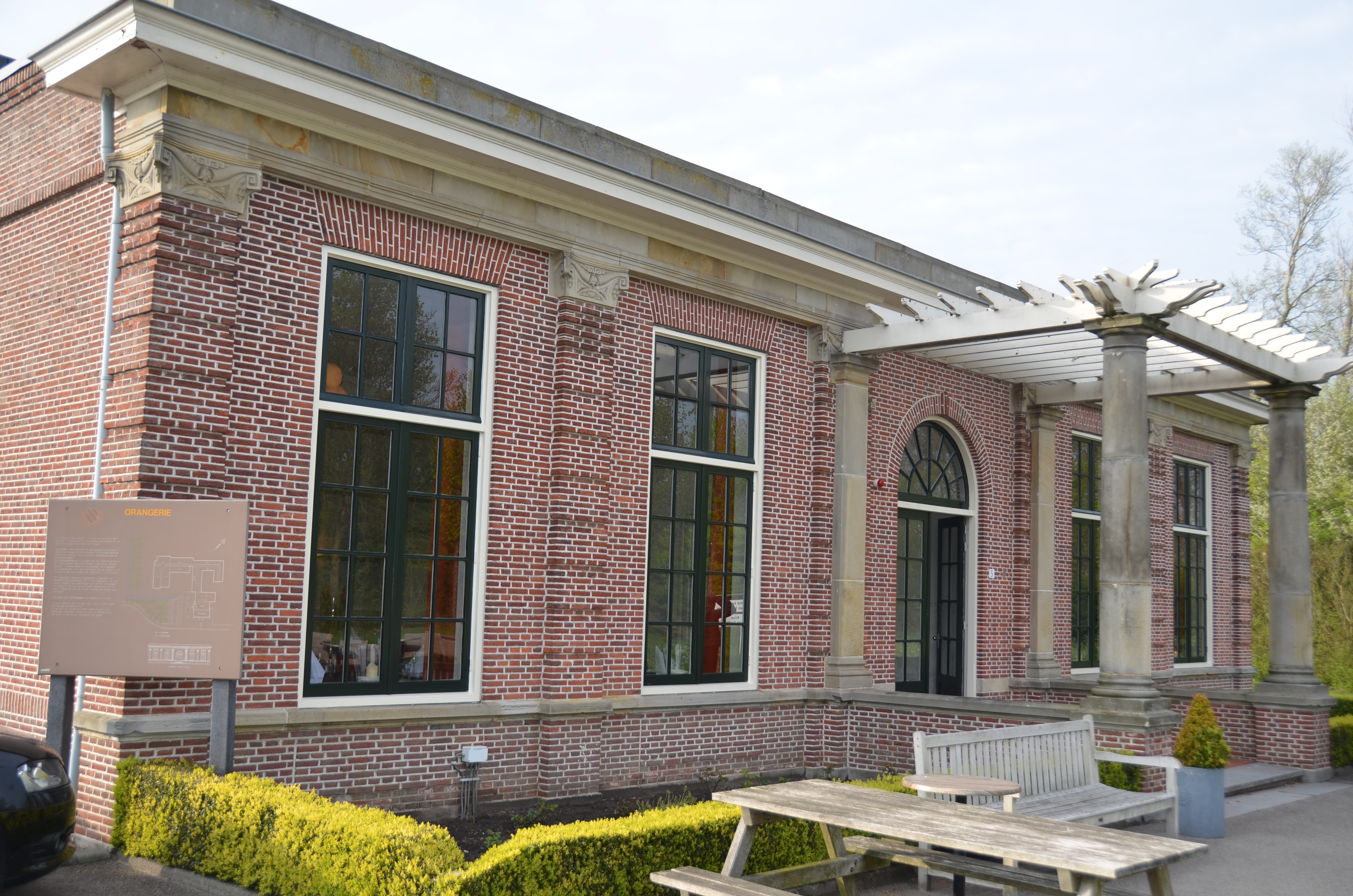
The Orangery

In 1987 the castle became known as Congrescentrum Slot Moermond. In 1990 the orangery was changed to get a breakfast room, two conference rooms, and 34 two-person bedrooms, instead of the single rooms which had been used by the workers on the dam. The castle itself continued in use for seminars and courses, as well as lunch and dinner.

=== Fletcher Hotels ===
On 1 December 2013 the hotel became part of Fletcher Hotels. Fletcher advertises the hotel as Fletcher Landgoed Hotel Renesse. It consists of a restaurant in the Orangery, and a building next to it. The castle is also managed by Fletcher, but it's not an integral part of the hotel. It can be hired for meetings, parties, congresses, and is a very popular wedding location in Zeeland.

The castle grounds are freely accessible. They form a 45 hectares nature preserve.
