= Floris I van Haamstede =

Abt 1300 - Abt 26 Sep 1345 Stavoren

- Lord of Haamstede
- Arms of the Van Haamstede's
- Predecessor: Witte van Haemstede
- Successor: Jan II van Haamstede
- Born: c. 1301
- Died: 27 September 1345; Stavoren, Frisia
- Mother: Agnes van der Sluijs

Floris I van Haamstede (c. 1301 - Battle of Warns, 1345) was Lord of Haamstede Castle on Schouwen, and of several other areas in Zeeland, Netherlands.

== Family ==
Floris was the son of Witte van Haemstede Lord of Haamstede, and Agnes van der Sluis. He had two younger brothers: Arnoud and Jan.

Witte died in 1321 and in December of that year Agnes became the guardian of their children in exchange for paying Count William III 900 pounds a year.

=== Marriage ===
In about 1320 Floris married Goede, daughter of Jan van Bergen from the Van Haerlem family, and Jutte Persijn. Goede would bring in the estate that her mother had been given by Jan Persijn. The count added 100 pounds a year, but that was all Floris was to get from Jan van Bergen's estate.

=== Children ===
Floris and Goede (sometimes Gudule) had:

- Jan II van Haamstede (1320-1386), mentioned as Squire Jan Lord of Haamstede in March 1350.
- Floris II van Haamstede

=== Family property arrangements ===
In 1335 Sir Floris and his brother Jan gave their brother Arnoud one third of the estate of their deceased father Witte, with promise to supplement this if Arnoud's share would render less than 27-30 Grooten. The occasion to split the estate was Arnoud's marriage to the daughter Matthijs Rengerszoon.

In 1338 Floris and his brother Arnoud were granted the estate of their deceased brother Jan. Knight Floris and his brother Arnoud then paid homage for these lands, which the count had granted to them on certain conditions. Arnoud had Moermond Castle. In March 1339 the count granted Arnoud the Lordships of Oostzaanden, Wormer, Akersloot and 20 pounds a year, as well as Hillegom and at least 20 pounds a year on that village. All for his life. By 1341 Arnoud was married to Margriete. The count then granted him that, if she died without them having a son, Arnoud could for his life keep all her estate, and that which would come to her daughter. In 1342 Arnoud got freedom of toll for his people of 's-heer Arnoudshaven on Schouwen.

== Life ==
=== Early career ===
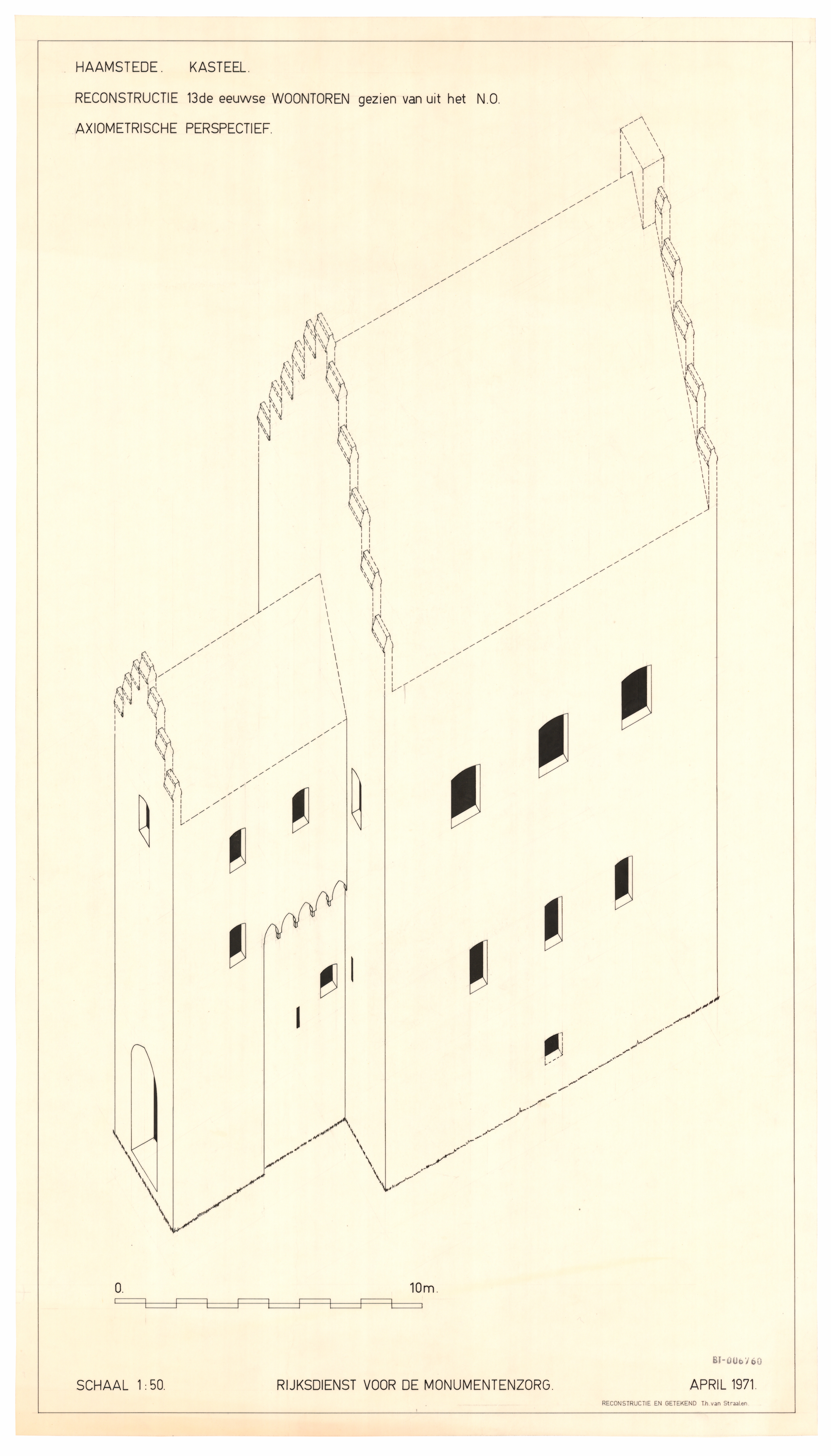
The 13th century keep at Haamstede.

In 1325 Floris was mentioned as a squire. In 1326 Count William authorized 'his nephew' Floris van Haamstede to judge a shipping accident. A ship from Renesse had collided with, and sunk, a small ship from Brouwershaven, leading to over 20 deaths. In April 1326 Floris brought somebody to judgement for stealing sheep. In December 1326 Squire Floris van Haamstede was mentioned as a witness about the border between Holland and Brabant near Strijen Castle in Oosterhout.

=== Knighthood ===
In April 1328 Floris is ranked second after the Lord of Voorne in a charter about the laws of Zeeland east of the Scheldt. In November 1328 Floris was mentioned as a knight. At the time Floris was not that important yet, because he was mentioned as number 10. In 1330 Floris did not succeed in extending the lease that his father Witte had on a plot of land.

In 1335 Floris was ordered by the count to make the citizens of Zierikzee pay their debts to the count. In 1338 Floris was present at the renewal of the laws of Dordrecht, still as 6th and last of the knights present. In 1338 the count granted the lands of Klaas van Kortgene on Noord-Beveland to Floris. In 1339-1340 Floris was often found as sealer zegelaar of papers issued by the count.

=== Baronage ===
Floris became a knight banneret or Baanrots in 1340 or 1341. This might have happened during, or after the 1340 Siege of Tournai. A banneret fought under his own banner during battle, and was of high status. On account of this elevation, Floris' fiefs were extended. He got all the count's land in Schachtekijnsepolder near Yerseke, in the polder across Coude Werve (Kerkwerve?) and in the polder behind Dunemedamme on Zuid-Beveland. All for his life, and that of his wife if she were to outlive him. In September 1343 Floris was bailiff of Zierikzee.

=== Service in the war against Utrecht and Frisia ===
On 21 June 1345 Count William IV of Holland gave securities for money he had secured from the biggest Holland and Zeeland cities. He needed the money for his war against the city of Utrecht and Frisia. For Zeeland the contract was signed by (in order and rank): Sir Wolfert III van Borselen Lord of Veere, Sir Floris Lord of Haamstede, Sir Arnoud van Haamstede Lord of Moermond the count's dear Nephews, and others.

The above 21 June 1345 was signed in the count's tent before Utrecht, and so we know Floris took part in the 1345 Siege of Utrecht, which ended 22 July 1345. On 19 September 1345 Floris declared to have borrowed 50 gold schilden from the abbot of Middelburg.

=== Death (1345) ===
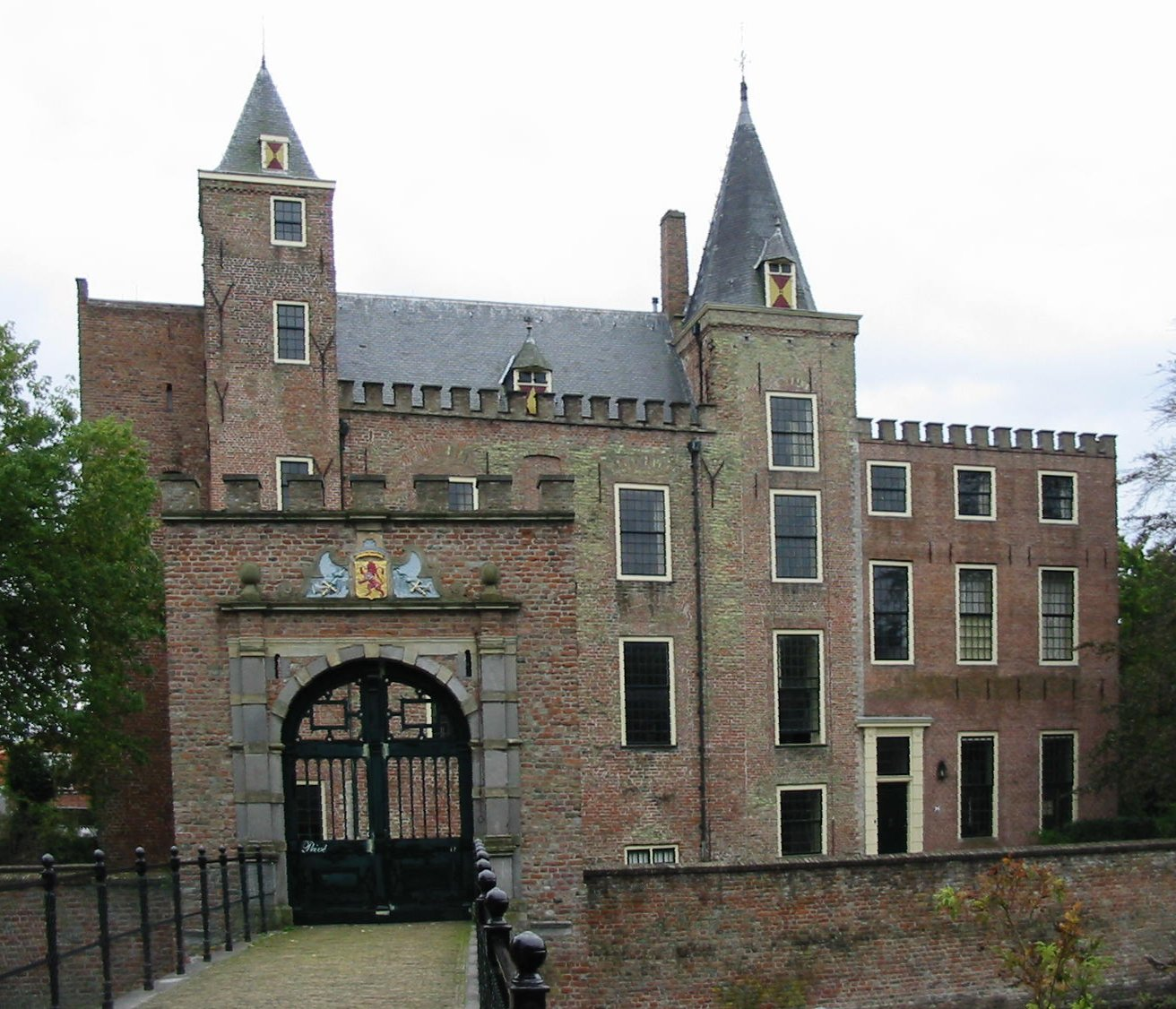
Gate at Haamstede Castle with coat of arms

The disastrous 26 September 1345 Battle of Warns would be Floris van Haamstede's last adventure. Among the casualties, he is mentioned as Dominus de Haemstede...(others)... barones. Floris figures in a medieval poem about the battle. This poem comes in multiple versions, this is one of them:

Den vierden baenrots sult ghy horen,
Van conincx Willams slecht geboren.
Hy droech den scilt van goude,
Een leeu van keel, die ridder boude,
ende in die borst een silveren rat.
Men vantten niet in Vlaenderen mat.

Translation:

The fourth baron you should hear,
he was born of King William's line.
He bore a golden shield,
it depicted a red lion,
On its breast was a silver wheel,
there was no match for him in Flanders?.
