= Maria Machteld van Sypesteyn =

Dutch artist (1724–1774)

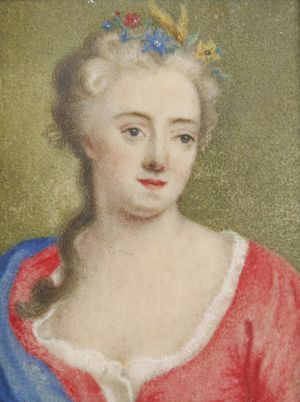
- Selfportrait
- Born: March 28, 1724; Haarlem
- Died: April 26, 1774 (aged 50); Heemstede
- Resting place: St. Bavochurch, Haarlem
- Known for: miniature portraits

Maria Machteld van Sypesteyn (1724–1774) was a painter from the Dutch Republic.

== Family ==
Maria Machteld van Sypesteyn was born in Haarlem as the daughter of the mayor Cornelis Ascanius van Sypesteyn (1694–1744), baljuw van Brederode, and Maria de Lange (1696–1744).

== Life ==
Maria became a pupil of the Haarlem miniature painter Henriëtte Wolters-van Pee, who she probably met through her father, who was a regent of the Proveniershuis where Henrëtte lived. She is known for miniatures on ivory in the manner of her teacher.

Maria married the wealthy mr. Pieter van Schuylenburch, heer van Moermond en Renesse (1714–1764) on 9 July 1743 in The Hague and the couple lived in Haarlem, where her husband became mayor in the 1760s. He died relatively young in 1764 and was buried in the family grave in the St. Bavochurch.

In 1767 Maria remarried to another member of the Haarlem regency, mr. David van Lennep, who contracted Jurriaan Andriessen to paint new wall decorations in his Huis te Manpad for her.

Sypesteyn died in Heemstede and was buried in the St. Bavochurch. Most of her works are still in the family collection.

== Gallery ==
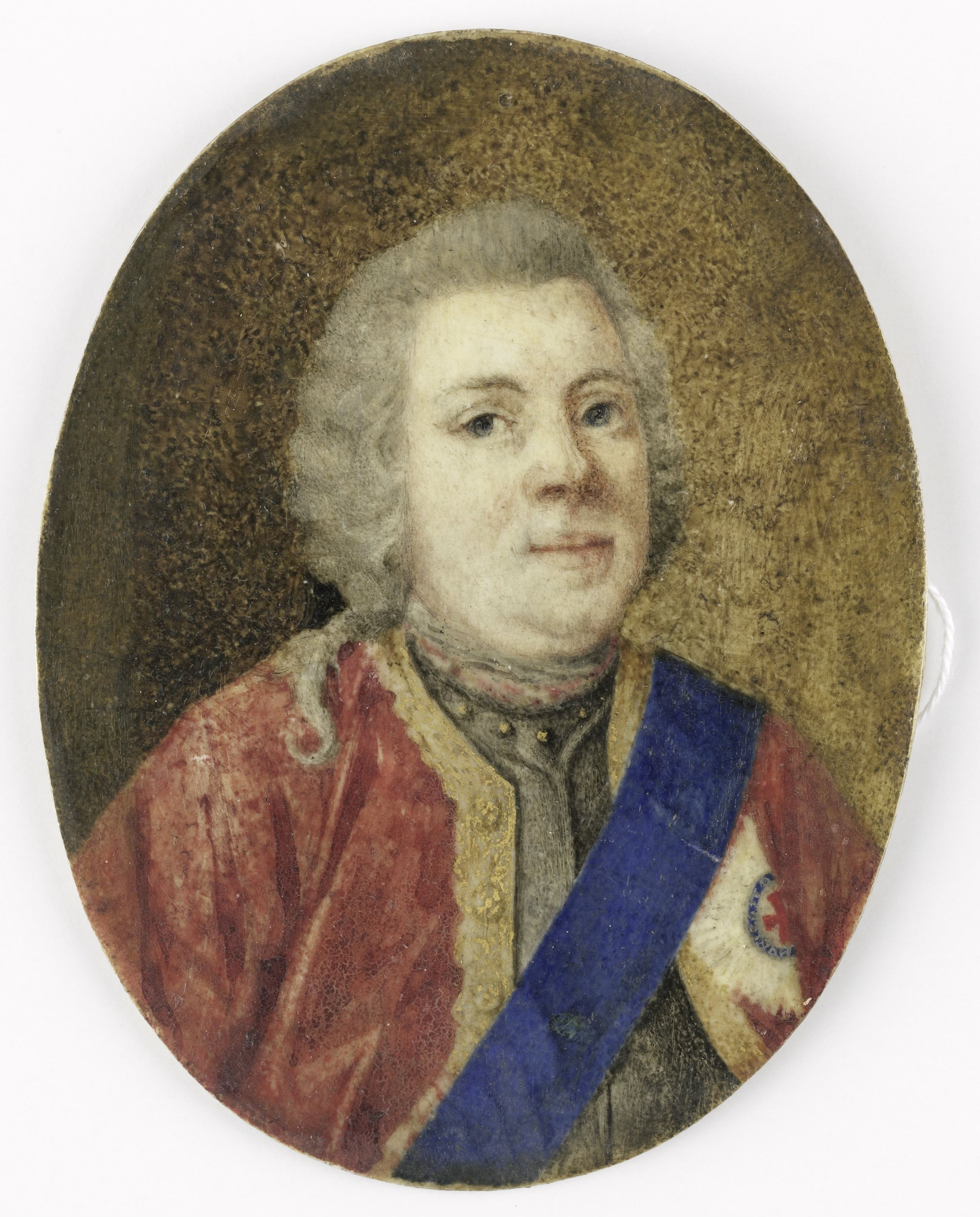
Portrait of Prince Willem IV

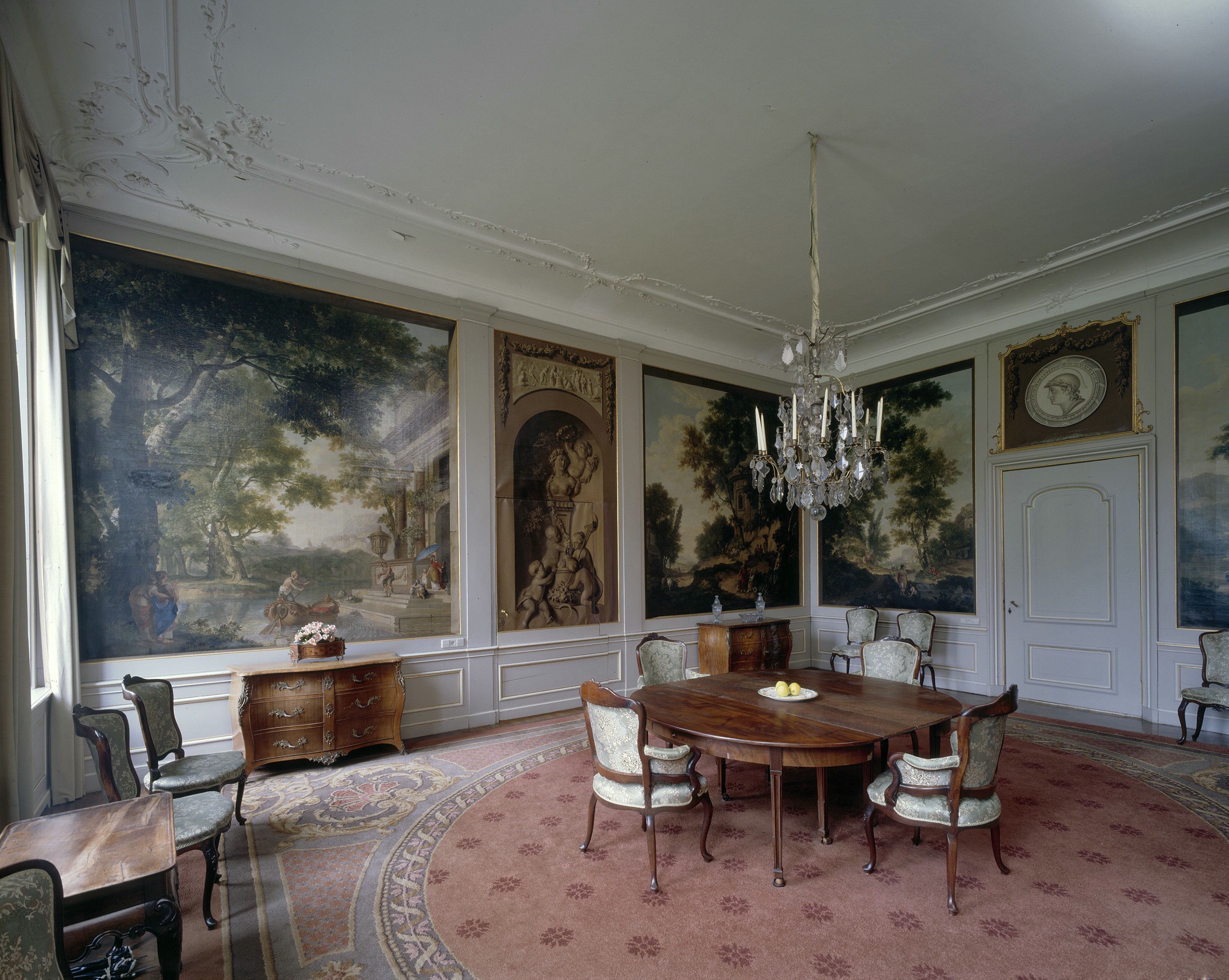
The new dining room walls painted for her by Andriessen
