= Strijen Castle =

Castle in Oosterhout, netherlands

- Kasteel Strijen
- Strijen
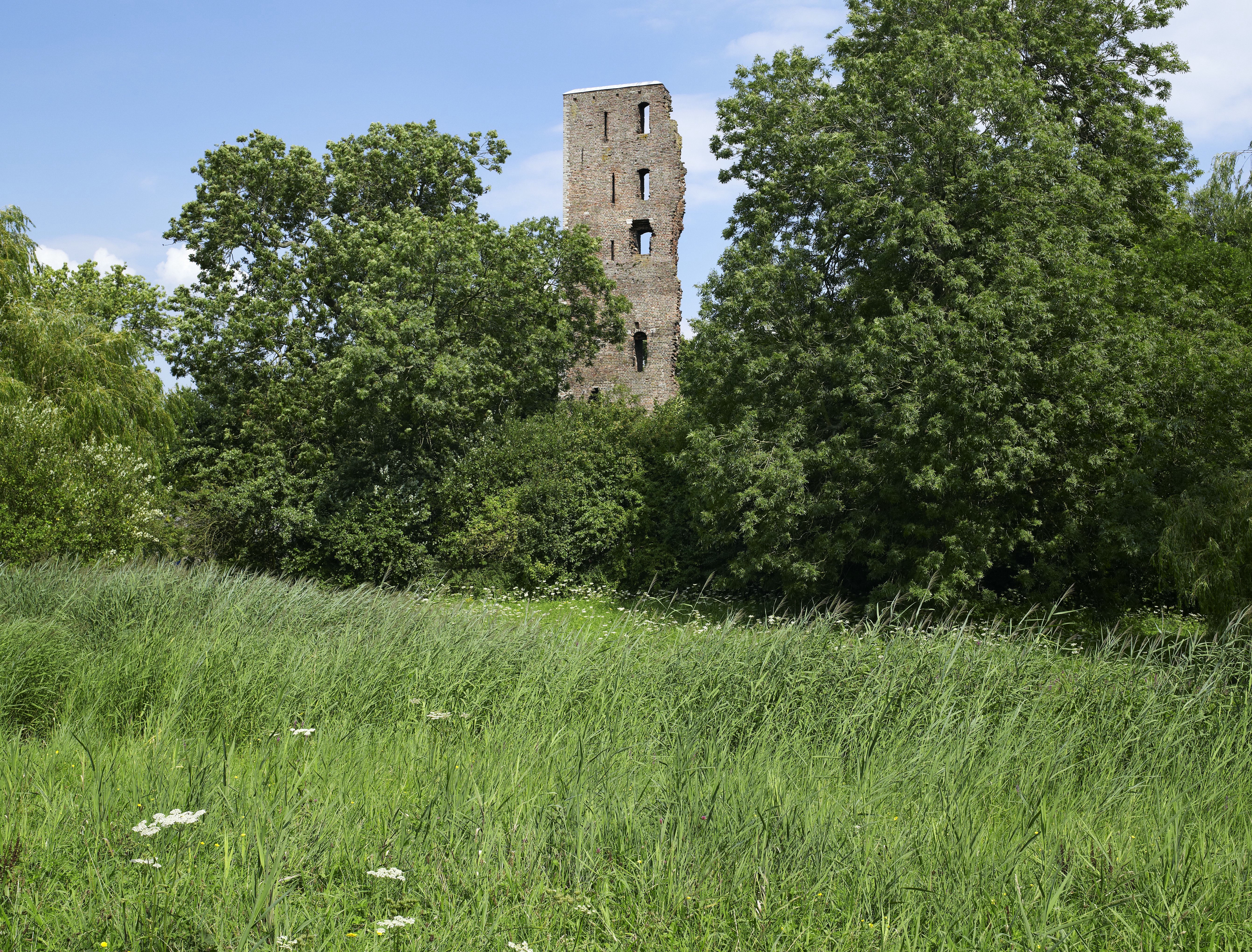
- Western façade of the tower fragment

Site information
- Open to the public: No

Location
- The Netherlands
- Location within North Brabant
- Coordinates: 51.655001°N 4.858709°E

Site history
- Built: 1289

Strijen Castle in Oosterhout was a major medieval castle in North-Brabant, Netherlands. The only visible remains consist of a fragment of the very high tower.

== History ==
Construction of Strijen Castle started in 1289. It was built by Willem van Strijen, a Holland nobleman from Strijen in the Hoeksche Waard. He bought the area near the Oosterhoutse Broek and built the first castle. When he died the lords of Putten en Strijen acquired the castle via his daughter.

In 1324 Willem van Duvenvoorde acquired the castle from Beatrijs van Putten en Strijen. Van Duvenvoorde was a very rich man and was powerful at the courts of Holland, Hainaut, and Brabant. He greatly expanded the castle. He was succeeded by his bastard son Willem van Oosterhout. The lords of Nassau succeeded to the castle after the Van Oosterhout family had died out. In the mid 16th century they had a castellan living on the castle.

During the Eighty Years' War Strijen Castle would be severely damaged. In 1572 the loyalist castellan Leonard van Boischot occupied the castle against the Geuzen. In 1573, the rebels conquered it. In 1573, the castle was besieged by loyalist troops, but in spite of having cannon, this siege failed, and by 1577 there were still rebel troops in the castle. It is very likely that the castle was damaged so severely that a decision was made not to repair it.

In 1617 the lords of Strijen allowed the castle to be used as a quarry for brick. This could easily be transported via the Oosterhout inland harbor. In 1753, gunpowder was used to aid in removing brick from the castle. It was likely that this was also the year that the huge tower (the keep) was blown up, but about a third remained standing. In 1885 a restoration of what remained of the tower started. From about 1888 new bricks were made to conserve the ruins.

== The Castle ==
=== The buildings ===
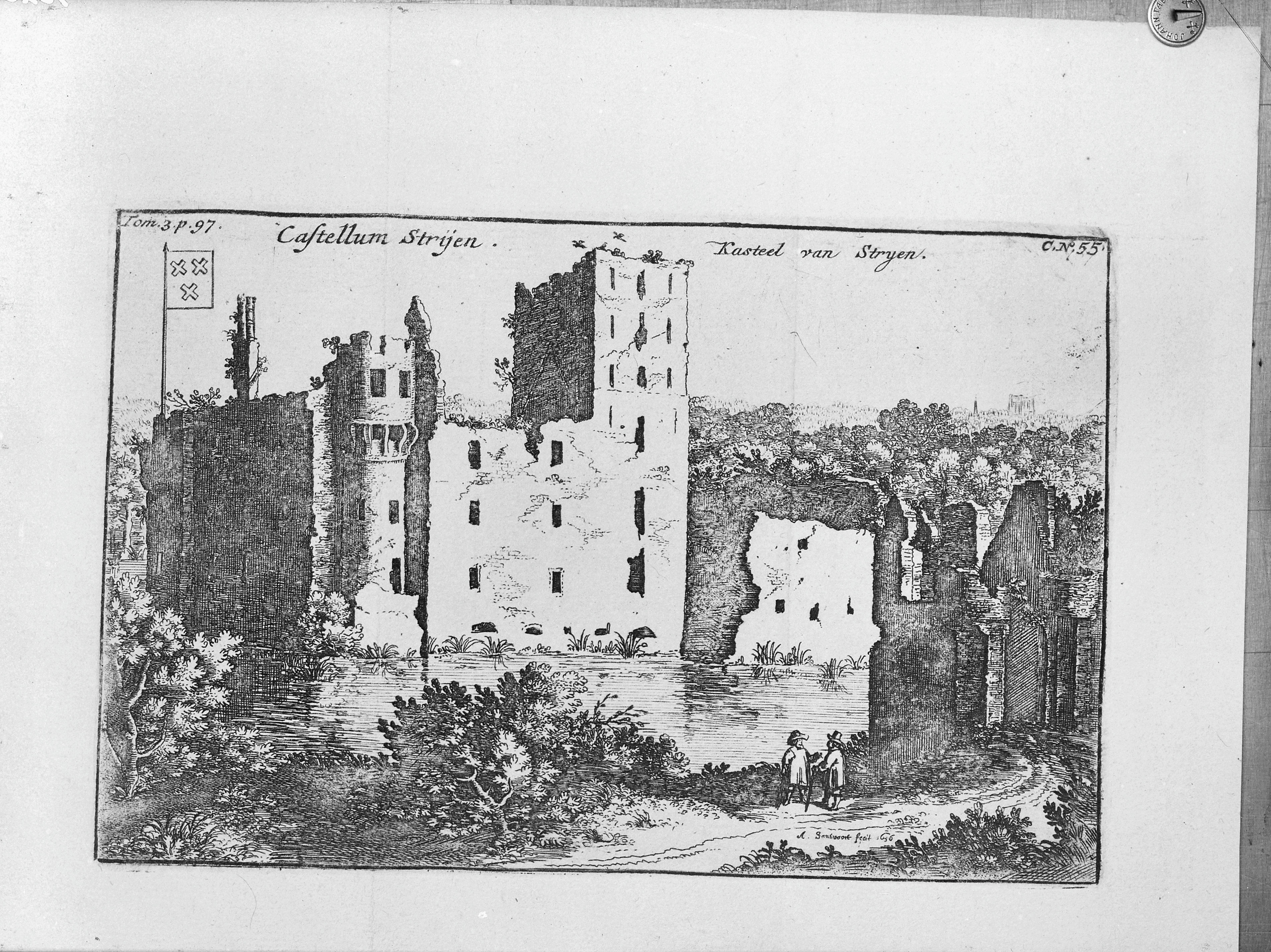
Drawing from 1656

The castle was originally built as an almost square castle. It had a keep, the current tower, on the northwest point and there were wings on the north, west and south sides. It had a single moat and a wooden bridge towards the north.

Willem van Duvenvoorde added an eastern wing, possibly with another square tower on the southeast side. He also gave the castle a double moat.

=== The excavations ===
Info sign

Strijen Castle in 2026

In 1974 a major excavation was performed on the terrain by amateur archaeologists led by Jan Oomen. This revealed a water gate on the west side of the castle grounds, facing the outer moat.

The 1974 excavation focused on the keep. It found the rest (foundations) of its northern and western walls, as well as the eastern and southern walls. The inside of the tower was found to be 8.45 m square. The northern and southern wall were 2 m thick. The western wall was 1.75 m thick. This would give the keep the outer dimensions of 12.5 by 12 m. Oomen did not note the dimensions of the bricks that he found in the locations he uncovered.

Inside the tower, the team of archaeologists found two vaults and some walls which had been added later. This might have been a prison that was mentioned in 1475. On the east side of the northern wall the team found the remains of a trash tube (stortkoker) with many artefacts below it.

In 1985 archaeologists found the southern part of the terrain between the inner and outer moats. They also found the remains of two quay walls on the inner side of this terrain. 1985 also saw the discovery of the northern part of the terrain between the two moats. This allowed a reasonably certain reconstruction of the terrains as they were. In 2015, an excavation with ground drills showed that the terrain of both the castle and the outer bailey was covered by a debris layer of a few decimeters.

A remarkable outcome of the excavations was that early 14th century pottery was hardly found near the keep. It was found south of the main castle. This confirms that Willem van Duvenvoorde resided in the newer parts of the castle when he was present. In the late 14th century, the habitation seems to revert to the keep and the northern wing.

=== The ruin ===
All that now remains visible of the castle are parts of the northern and western wall of the tower. These fragments are about 27 m high, i.e. 6 floors.
