= Haamstede Castle =

Castle in the village of Haamstede on the island of Schouwen-Duiveland

- Slot Haamstede
- Near Haamstede, Zeeland, the Netherlands
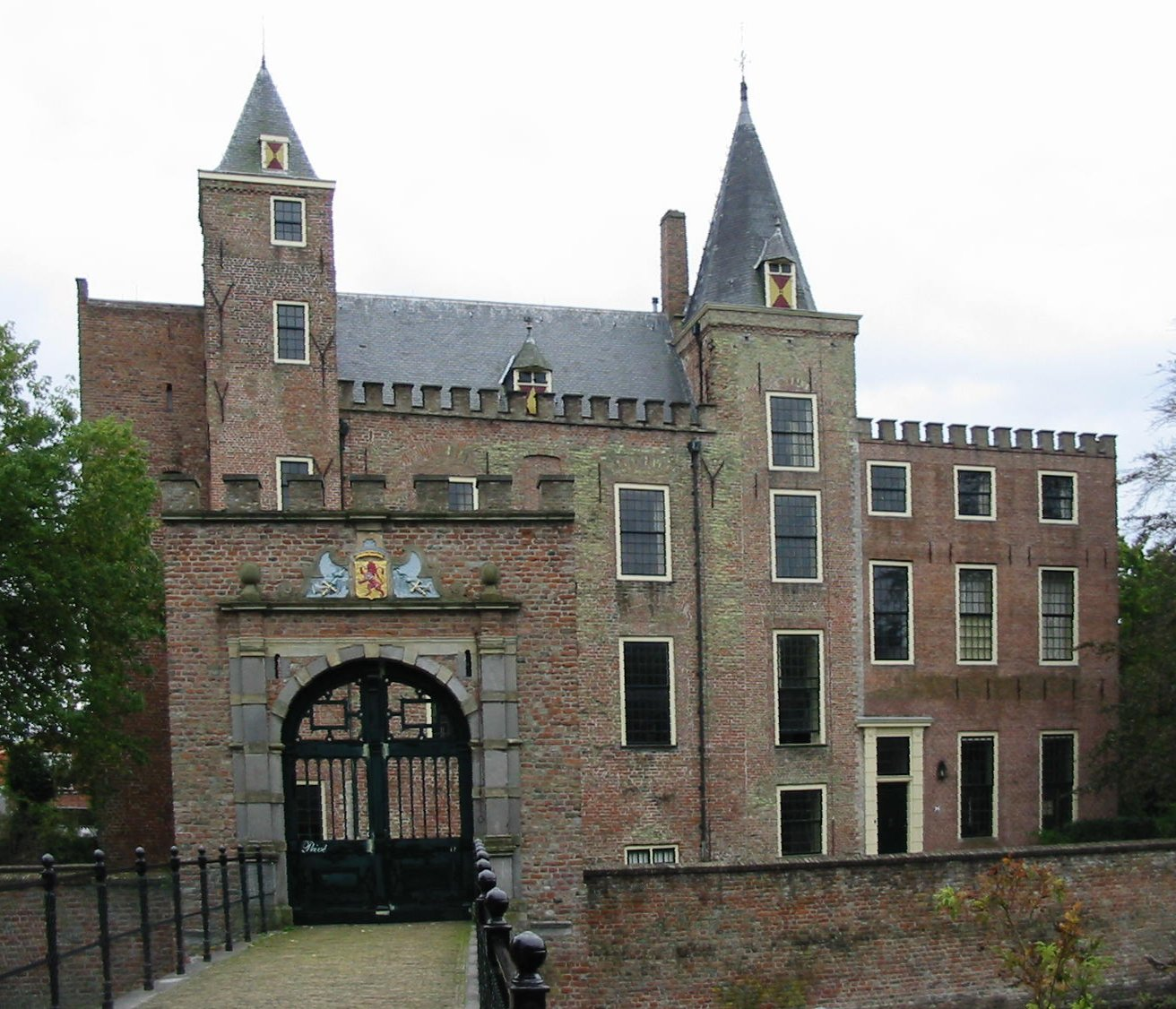
- Haamstede Castle front side

Site information
- Type: Castle
- Open to the public: No

Location
- The Netherlands
- Location within Zeeland
- Coordinates: 51.697914°N 3.742163°E

Site history
- Built: 13th century
- Materials: brick
- Demolished: Second castle 1525; Tower house remains

Haamstede Castle (Dutch: Slot Haamstede) is a castle in the village of Haamstede on the island of Schouwen-Duiveland. It is a rijksmonument.

== Castle characteristics ==
The keep dates from the 13th century. In 1525 Haamstede castle (except the donjon) was destroyed by fire. The castle's current appearance is largely due to the poet and army captain Jacob van den Eynde, who acquired the castle and restored it. His successors expanded it in the 18th century. Up till the archaeological investigations in 1964 and 1965 this obscured many characteristics of the original castle.

=== Roman remains ===
The archaeological excavations at the castle grounds led to a big surprise while digging east of the keep. Here the archeologists found a lot of tuff at a depth of 2.5 m, a few decimeters above Amsterdam Ordnance Datum. They even found a small wall of tuff. They also found the remains of a cemetery, with skeletons aligned east west, and buried after the tuff wall was made. Renaud therefore thought the tuff wall could be of Roman origin. Later, the total came to 15 graves. Further investigation dated the graves to about 850. Still later, 29 bodies had been found, and the skull form was identified as Alpine, so the bodies were not Viking. The date was then specified as before 1100.

=== The first castle (second half 13th century) ===
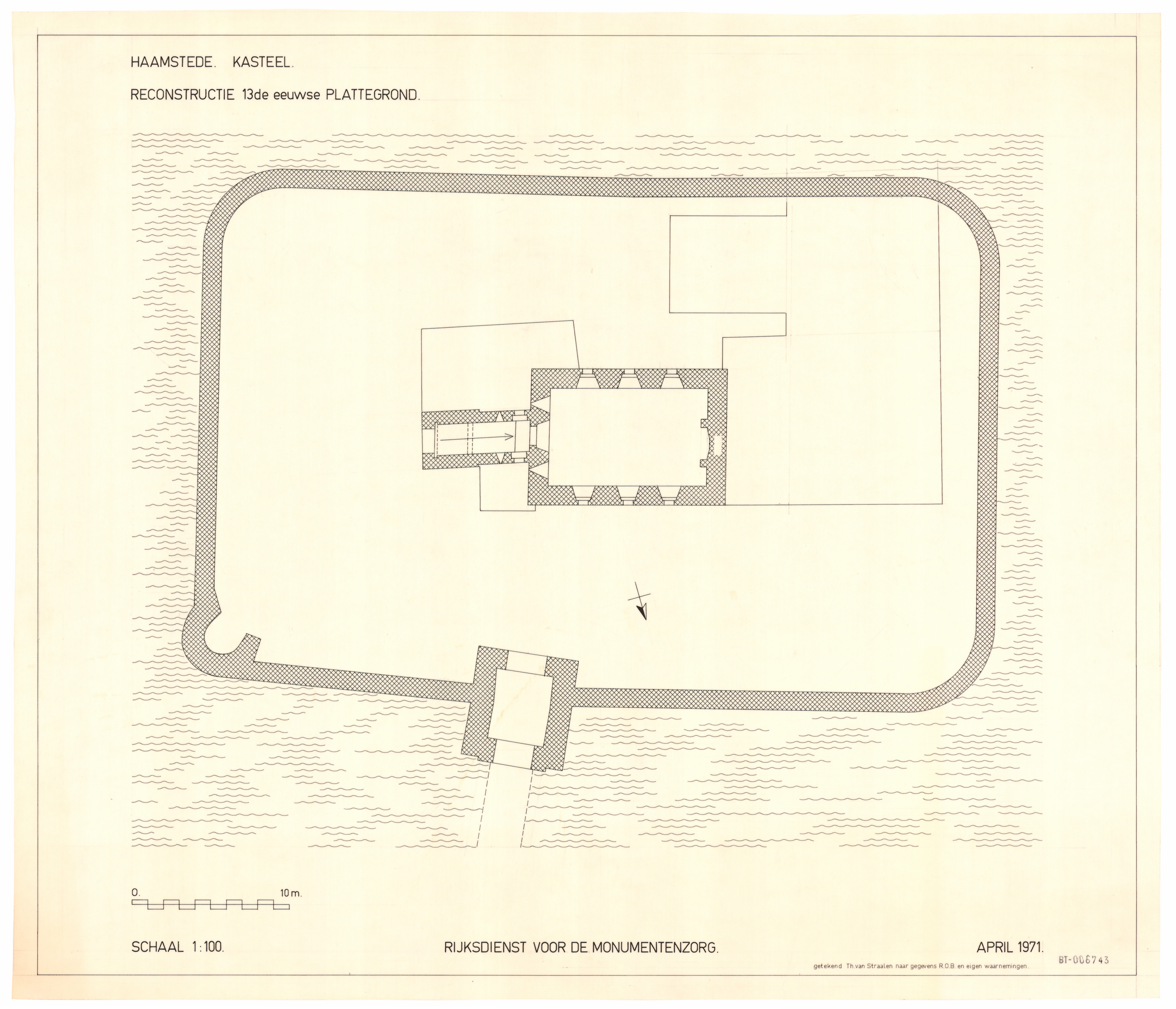
Haamstede, 13th century

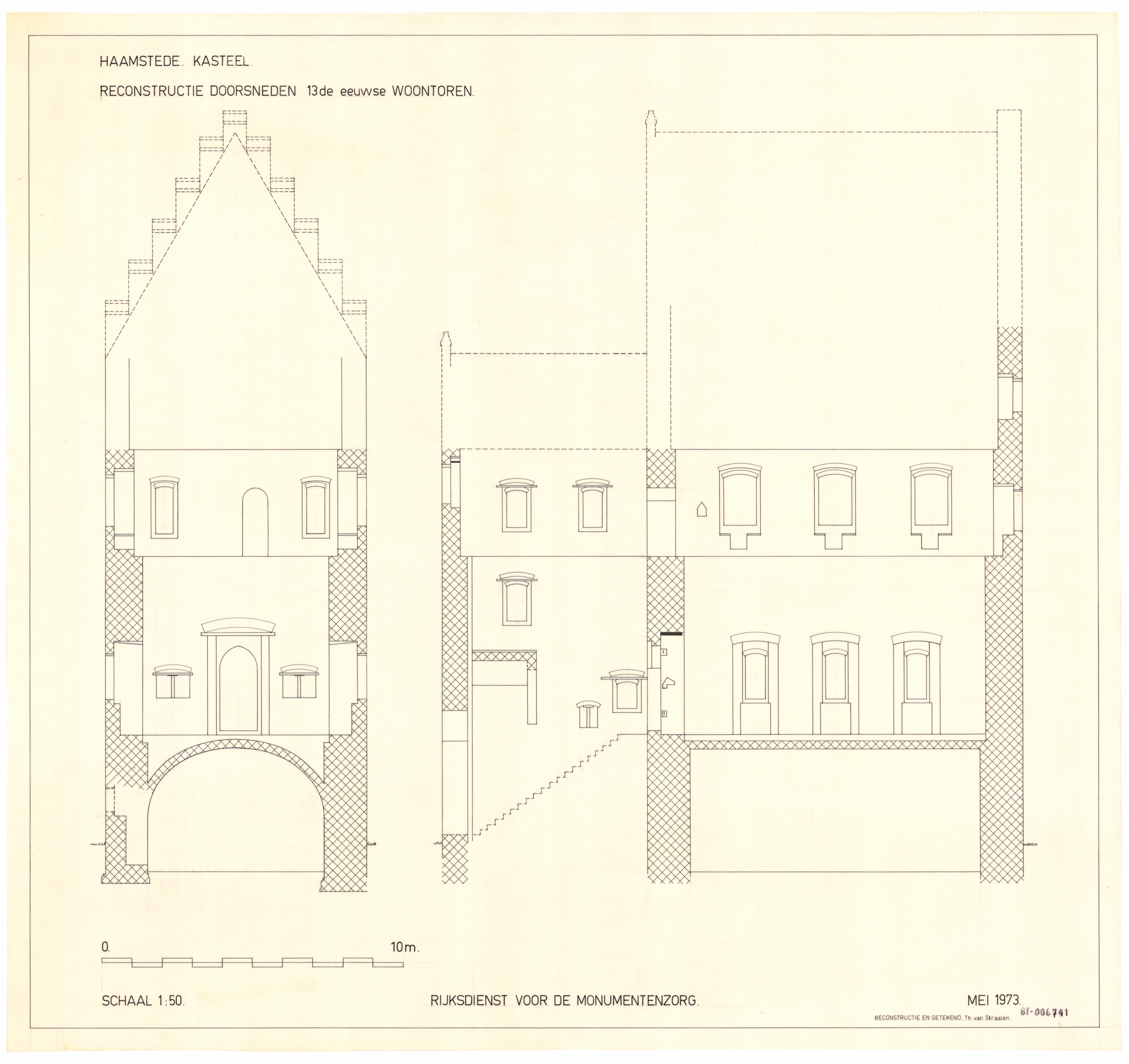
Reconstruction of the keep

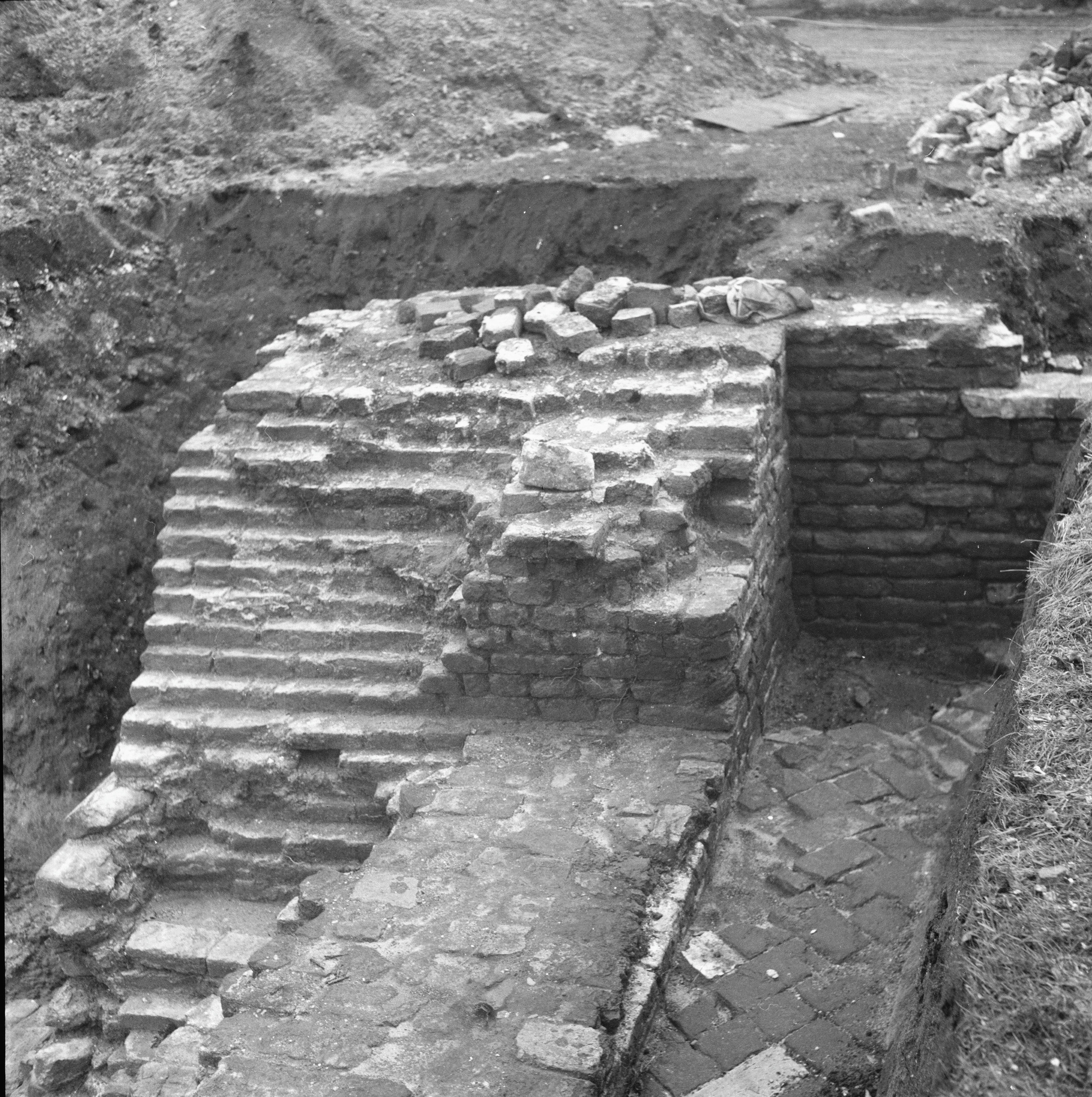
Remains of heavy 15th century northwest tower

The first castle built at Haamstede consisted of a central keep inside a square surrounding wall with a gatehouse. All three elements probably date from the second half of the thirteenth century. This was primarily deduced from the size of the brick, which is 29.5-31 * 14.5-15 * 7.2–8 cm laid in Flemish masonry bond.

The first castle can be characterized as a tower castle. A tower castle or Turmburg is a tower house that was designed to be built together, and standing free of a surrounding wall. This way the tower house, or keep, was really a refuge of last resort, instead of a part of the main defensive line. Tower castles are rare in the Netherlands. Demolished examples are Groesbeek Castle, Swormertoren, Geijsteren Castle, and Ter Leede Castle near Leerdam. While Haamstede resembles these, its surrounding wall is much larger. The configuration of Haamstede therefore also resembles Te Riviere Castle and probably at Oud Haerlem Castle.

The keep itself has a connected external gate building (not the gatehouse), which is very rare in the Netherlands. Both are part of the current castle. The keep is now the central part of the castle, the gate building is now part of the building with the shed roof. The keep measures 12.60 by 8.70 m, the gate building 6.80 by 3.65 m, both are equally old, even though the lowest 3.5 m of the two buildings have not been laid in one bond.

The original basement of the keep was vaulted and has walls of a modest 1.42 m thickness. The vault is a barrel vault of one brick (c. 30 cm) thickness. The basement could only be reached from the first floor above it. It had a fireplace on the west side. It had small light opening on the northern side.

The first floor or main hall, has walls of 1.22 m thick. It was about 6 m high, and had a tiled floor and a fireplace. The room had six relatively large windows of 150 * 64 cm, which could be closed by single shutters on the inside. A spiral stair in the southeastern corner probably went up- and downwards.

The second floor has walls of 95 cm thick. It was 3.60 m high, and had no fireplace. It had windows on all four sides. The three windows on each long side were 1.70 by 1.10 m with double shutters, and benches on the inside. This room was in open connection (no door) with the top floor of the gate building.

The third floor is no longer present. However, from the remains of two windows in the western wall, it can be deduced that the northern wall reached at least 3 m above the top of the second floor.

The small gate building connected to the keep, guarded its entrance, which could be closed by a portcullis which could slide down through grooves in the walls. In the length the building had a stair which rose 3.10 m to reach a platform before the door of the main hall of the keep. Above the bottom of the stairs, there was a small barrel vault, which supported a space from which the portcullis could be operated.

The gatehouse formed part of the first wall which surrounded the keep. Renaud thought it very likely that these were built at about the same time as the keep, but could not prove a date. He did find the remains of a corner tower on the northeastern corner.

In the first half of the fourteenth century, a building was added to the southeast of the keep. This kind of hid the original gatehouse building, and later led to the strange shed roof. The barrel vaulted basement of this building is still intact.

=== The second castle (15th century) ===
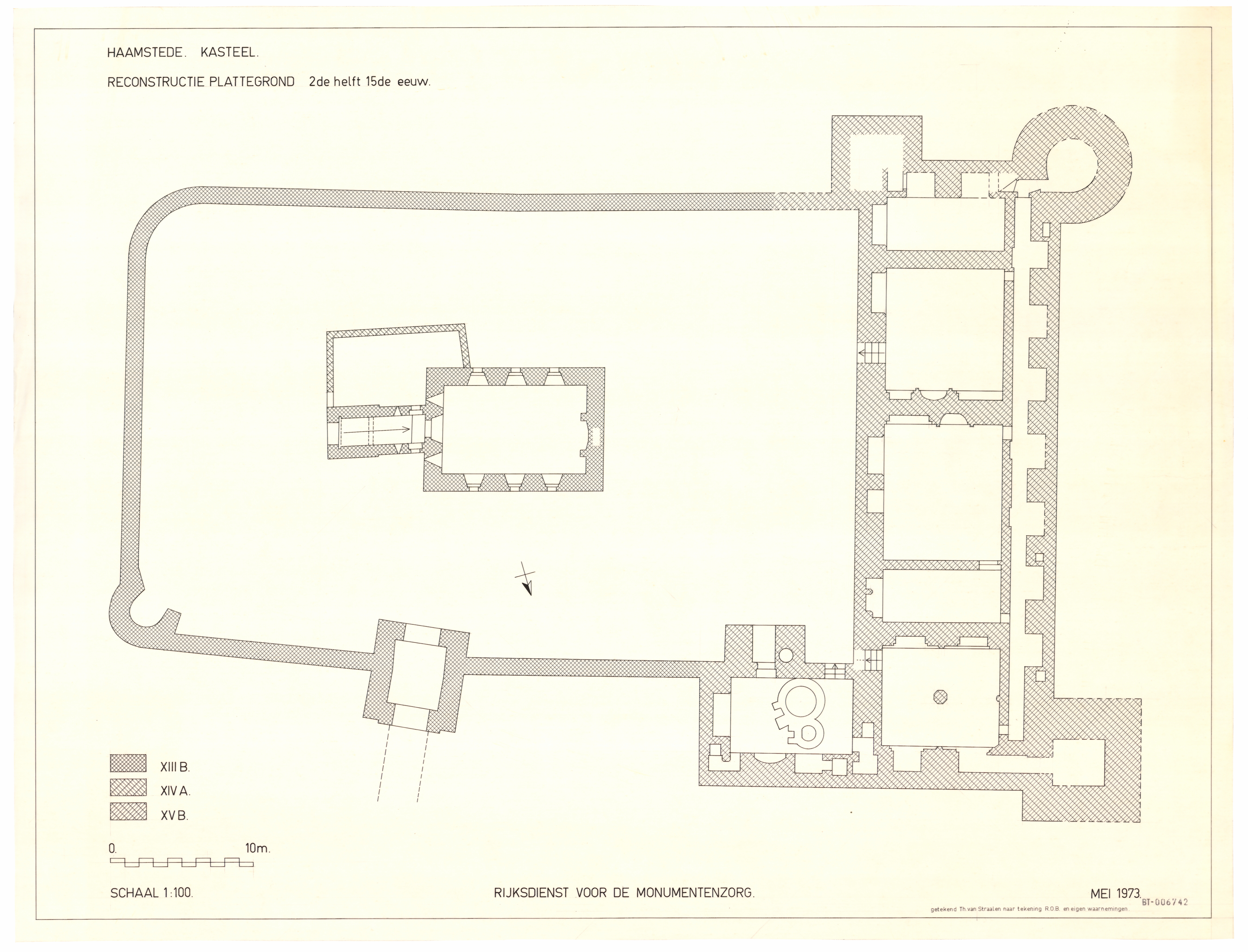
Floor plan 2nd half 15th C.

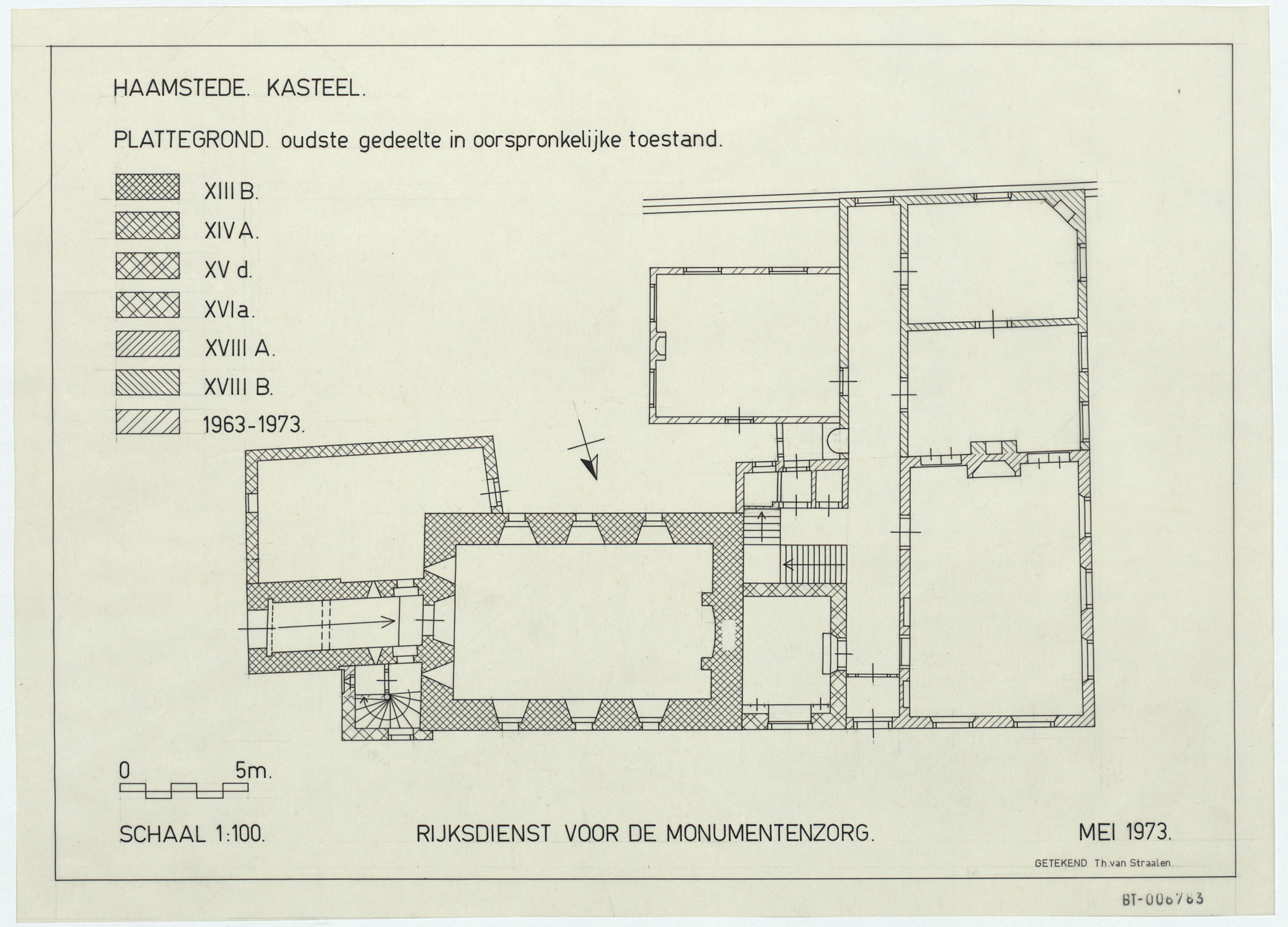
Current castle floor plan

Even before the 1960 excavations there were clues that the castle that was burned in 1525 was much larger than the present castle. What was especially strange was the distance of 32 m between the western wall, and the keep. This was not logical from a defensive point of view.

Next, on the northwest corner, the remains of a foundation which protruded into the moat were found. After soundings, digging uncovered a complete western wing. It would be better to refer to a second castle, as it was about four times as large as what had been constructed up to then. See floor plan 2nd half of 15th century. Meanwhile, the original western enclosing wall of the 14th century was found about 16 m from the keep.

The late medieval construction was built to use firearms or cannon. The 2 m thick west wall had 7 niches. Behind it is a parallel corridor of about a meter wide. This might have been done to prevent gunpowder smoke from reaching the rest of the building. A wall of 60 cm separated the corridor from the basements east of it.

On the southwest corner, a large round tower was built into the moat. On the northwest corner was a large heavy square tower. The wing was extended to the east for about 10 m, and here the remains of two circular bread ovens were found.

A likely candidate to have built the second castle is Louis de Gruuthuse (1427-1492). It did not last long. On account on account of the victory of Charles V, Holy Roman Emperor in the Battle of Pavia in February 1525, the castle was illuminated with tar barrels. Some sparks were noticed too late, and caused a fire which burned down the whole castle. In the 1964-65 investigation traces of fire were indeed also found on the old keep.

=== The current (third) castle (18th century) ===
It was probably only in 1609 that the castle was restored. Jacob van den Eijnde then lived at the castle. Rutger Motte owned the castle between 1706 and 1709, and probably built the current western part of the castle, which has nothing to do with the late 15th century wing.

== History ==
=== Van Renesse van Haamstede ===
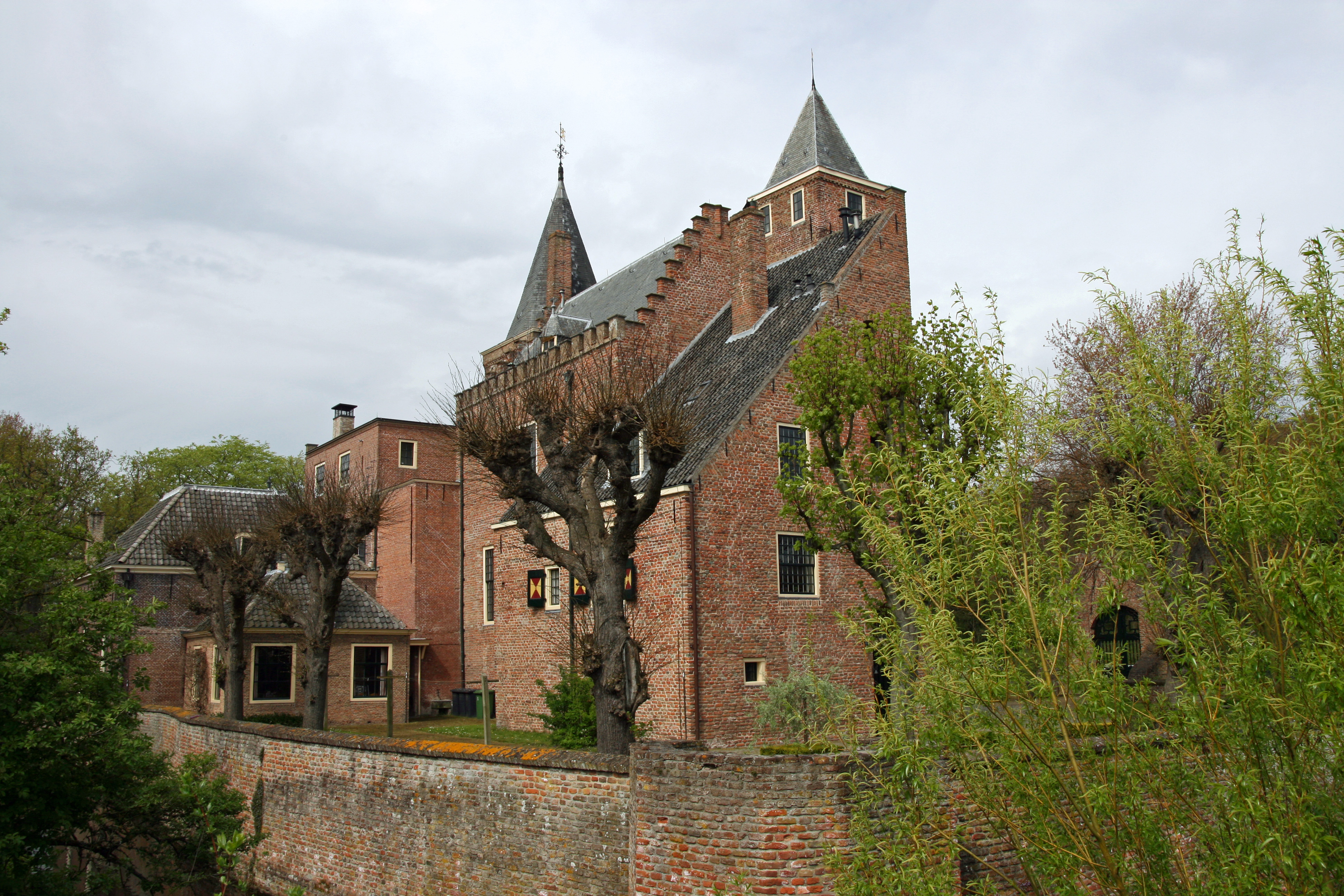
Haamstede Castle from behind

In March 1270 or 1271 Floris V, Count of Holland was at Haamstede Castle. At the time the castle belonged to a branch of the Van Renesse family, naming itself Van Renesse van Haamstede. In about 1296 Jan van Renesse van Haamstede, son of Costijn died childless, leading to the count of Zeeland becoming owner of Haamstede.

=== Van Haamstede ===
In October 1299 John I, Count of Holland, then gave Haamstede to his dear brother Witte (1280/1282–1321). Witte was a bastard of Floris V. Witte thus became Witte van Haemstede. He became famous in the early nineteenth century for beating the Flemish in 1304. Nowadays it is not so sure that this really happened. In 1313 Witte again got Haamstede granted to him, as well as a lot of other territories of the Van Renesse family on Schouwen. It therefore seems that the first grant did not lead to an actual change of possession.

After the death of Witte his extensive goods remained undivided till 1335. Witte was succeeded by his son Floris I van Haamstede, who is mentioned as Lord of Haamstede in July 1338. According to Nagtglas a Floris was killed in the Battle of Zwartewaal. What is certain is that Floris I van Haamstede was killed near Warns in 1345.

In 1354 A Jan Suermont, bastard of Willem III of Holland, got Haamstede Castle from Count Willem V.

=== De Gruuthuse ===
In June 1456 Louis de Gruuthuse (1427-1492) bought Haamstede. After an (armed) conflict with the Lord of Hodenpijl, Louis definitely gained control of Haamstede in 1468. In 1493 he was succeeded by his son Jan, who married Maria de Melun. In 1525 the castle burned down, see above.

Jan's son René (?-1572) married Beatrix de la Chambre. Their daughter Maria Catharina van Brugge married Louis de la Baume Lord of Perez etc. Because he was on the Spanish side, Haamstede was sequestered by the States of Zeeland in 1583.

=== Van den Eynde ===
In 1609 Jonkheer Jacob van den Eynde married Clara van Raaphorst, and so became owner of Haamstede Castle. He was a captain in the army and died in 1614. His widow then remarried to Jacob Jacobsz. de Witte, and died in 1620. In 1638 he was succeeded by his son Witte Jacobsz. de Witte. After Witte's death he was succeeded by his sister Agatha.

=== Van der Lek de Clercq ===
In April 1853 Haamstede Castle was auctioned for 96,184.30 guilders. There were four buyers, but in 1863 Mr. C. van der Lek de Clerq became the sole owner.

== Current owners ==
In 1973 the castle had been restored. In 1981 it was sold to Natuurmonumenten Society. However, the family preserved the right to live in the castle.
