= Witte van Haemstede =

Dutch noble

- Lord of Haamstede
- Arms of the Van Haamstede's
- Predecessor: Jan van Renesse van Haamstede
- Successor: Floris I van Haamstede
- Died: 1321
- Father: Floris V of Holland
- Mother: ?

Witte van Haemstede (c. 1281–1321) was a bastard son of Floris V, Count of Holland, famous for military prowess.

== Family ==
Witte's half-brother John I, Count of Holland, gave him the property connected to Haamstede Castle, in Zeeland.

== Battle at the Manpad ==
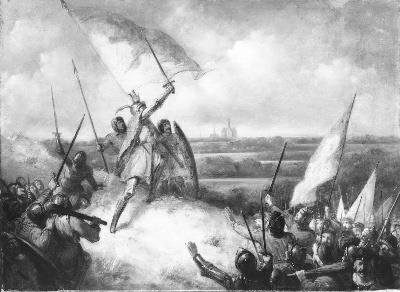
Witte van Haemstede on De Blinkert in 1304 (by Jacobus van Dijck)

In 1304 Witte led an army to victory in a battle against the Flemish, who were threatening the city of Haarlem. He is said to have defeated the Flemish near Heemstede with the help of the Haarlemmers at the site of the Manpad.

In 1817 Mr. David Jacob van Lennep, who lived in the stately house called Huis te Manpad next to the Manpad, encouraged the Heemstede council to erect a monument. Van Lennep had already composed a romantic song about Witte van Haemstede that was quite popular. The legend says that Witte van Haemstede arrived by ship at Zandvoort and traveled overland to Haarlem over the Manpad, to help the Haarlemmers in their battle against the Flemish who had traveled overland from Hillegom and Lisse. This monument is called 'De Naald' (The Needle).

== Offspring ==
Witte married Agnes van der Sluys, in or before 1307. Their descendants were the Lords of Haamstede. Witte had three sons:

- Floris I van Haamstede (1301-1345)
- Arnoud
- Jan
