= Haamstede =

- Village
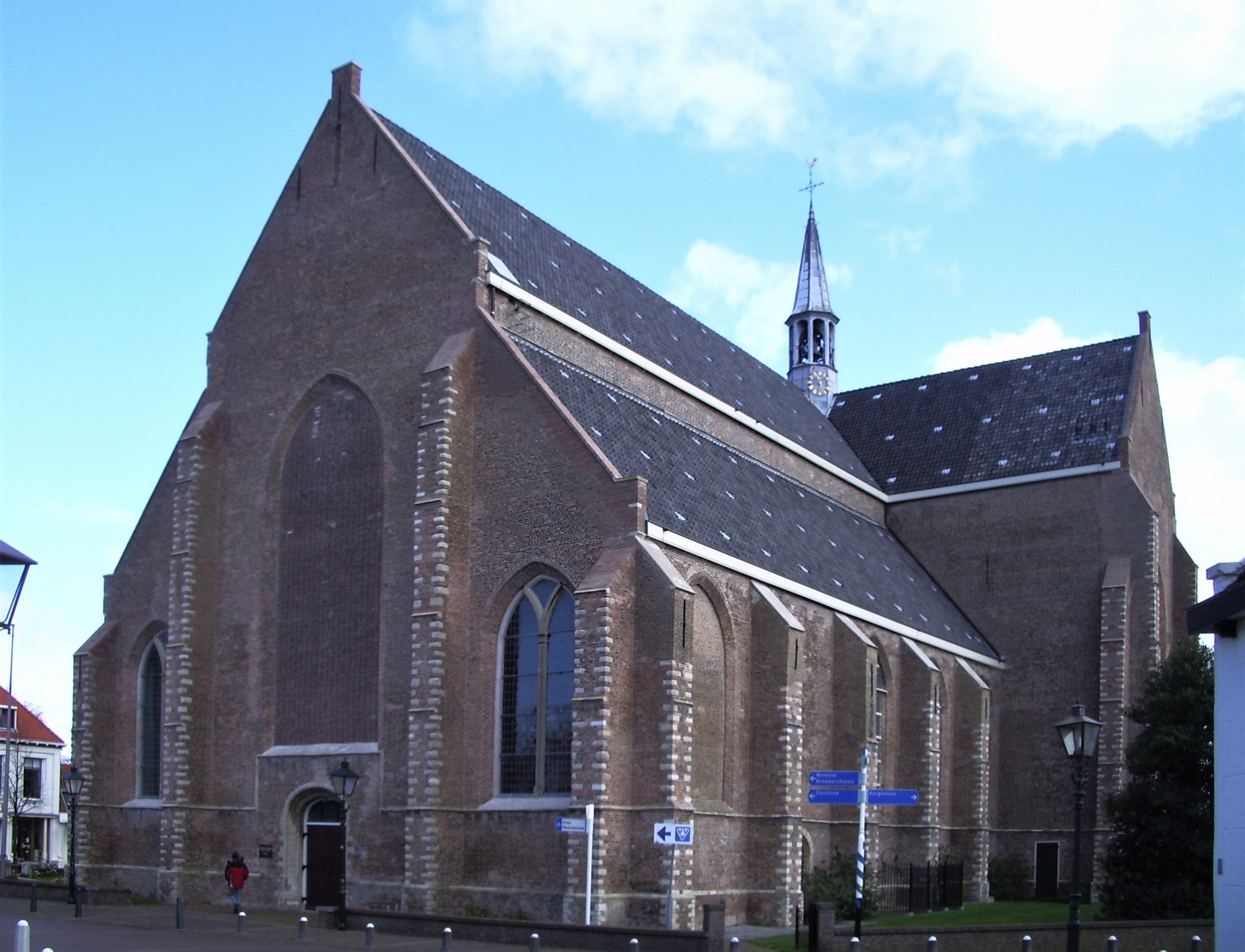
- Church

- Coat of arms

- Location in the province of Zeeland in the Netherlands Haamstede (Netherlands)
- Coordinates: 51°41′48″N 3°44′37″E
- Country: Netherlands
- Province: Zeeland
- Municipality: Schouwen-Duiveland

Area
  - Total: 1.02 km^{2} (0.39 sq mi)
- Elevation: 3.0 m (9.8 ft)

Population (2021)
  - Total: 2,020
  - Density: 1,980/km^{2} (5,130/sq mi)
- Time zone: UTC+1 (CET)
  - Summer (DST): UTC+2 (CEST)
- Postal code: 4328
- Dialing code: 0111

Haamstede is a village in the Dutch province of Zeeland. It is a part of the municipality of Schouwen-Duiveland. The village is known for Haamstede Castle.

== History ==
The village was first mentioned in 1229 as Haemstede, and means "place with a house or farm". Haamstede is a circular village around a church. The first church was built in the first half of the 10th century. Until 1229, it was a heerlijkheid of the Lords of Renesse who built a castle. After 1454, Haamstede became a possession of the County of Burgundy. The castle was restored in the 17th century, and Haamstede developed into a castle village.

The keep of Haamstede Castle dates from the 13th century. In 1525, Charles V, Holy Roman Emperor organised a party in the castle to celebrate his victory over France. Due to carelessness, the castle burnt down. The castle was confiscated by the States of Zeeland in 1591 and sold. In 1608, it was owned by Jacob van den Eynde who restored and enlarged the castle. In 1853, it became property of the Van der Lek de Clercq family. The castle was restored 1888. In 1981, the castle with forest and dunes became property of Natuurmonumenten to ensure its future and make the castle accessible to the public.

The Dutch Reformed church is a three aisled cruciform church without a tower or choir which was built in the early 16th century as a replacement of the 11th century church which burnt down in 1506. The church was restored in 1956.

Haamstede was home to 819 people in 1840. After World War II, Haamstede developed into a tourist site and started to form a single urban area with Burgh. Haamstede was a separate municipality until 1961, when it was merged into Westerschouwen. In 1997, it became part of the municipality of Schouwen-Duiveland.

== Buildings ==
- Haamstede Castle
- Dutch Reformed church
- Westerlichttoren lighthouse

== Gallery ==
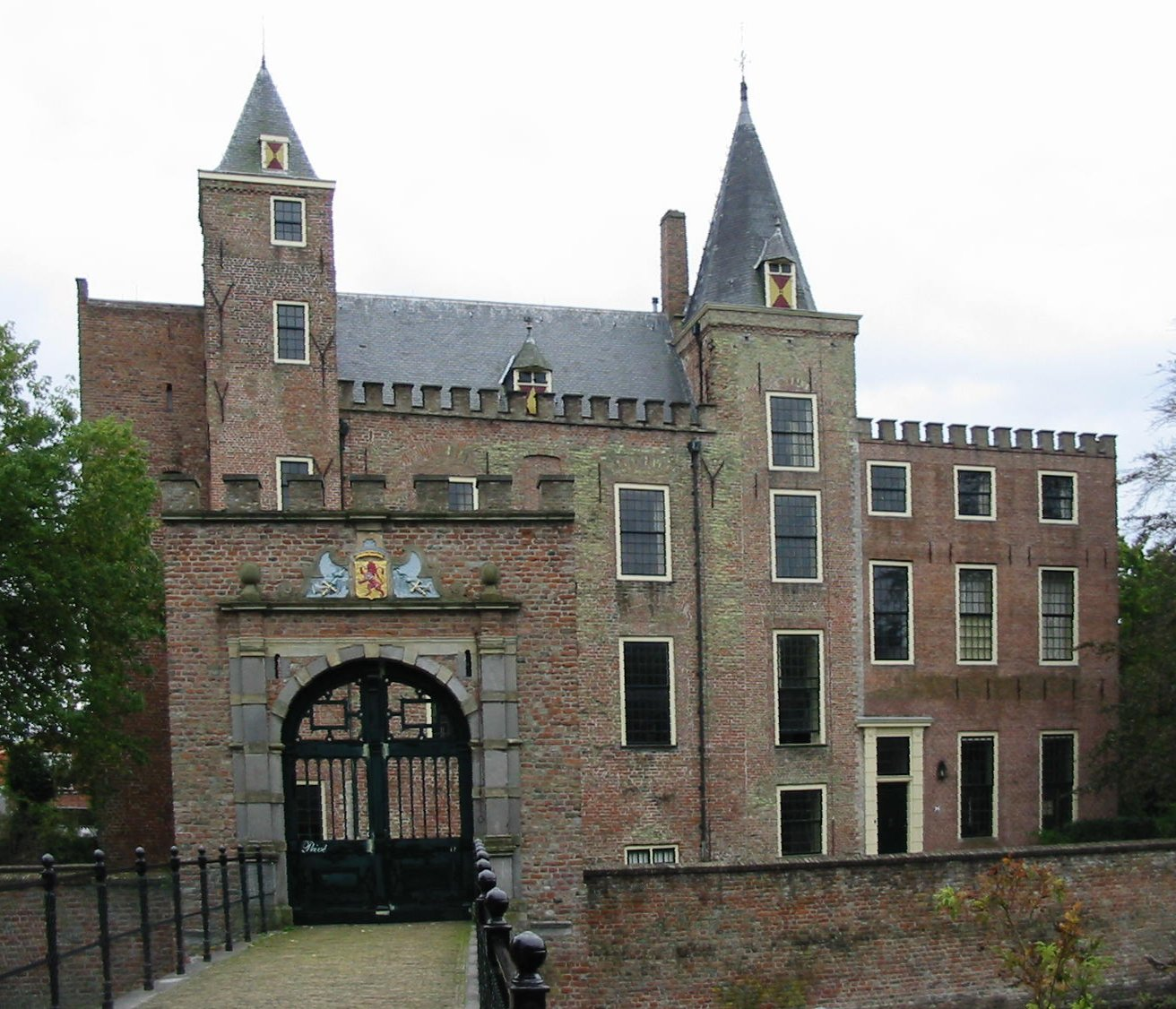
Haamstede Castle

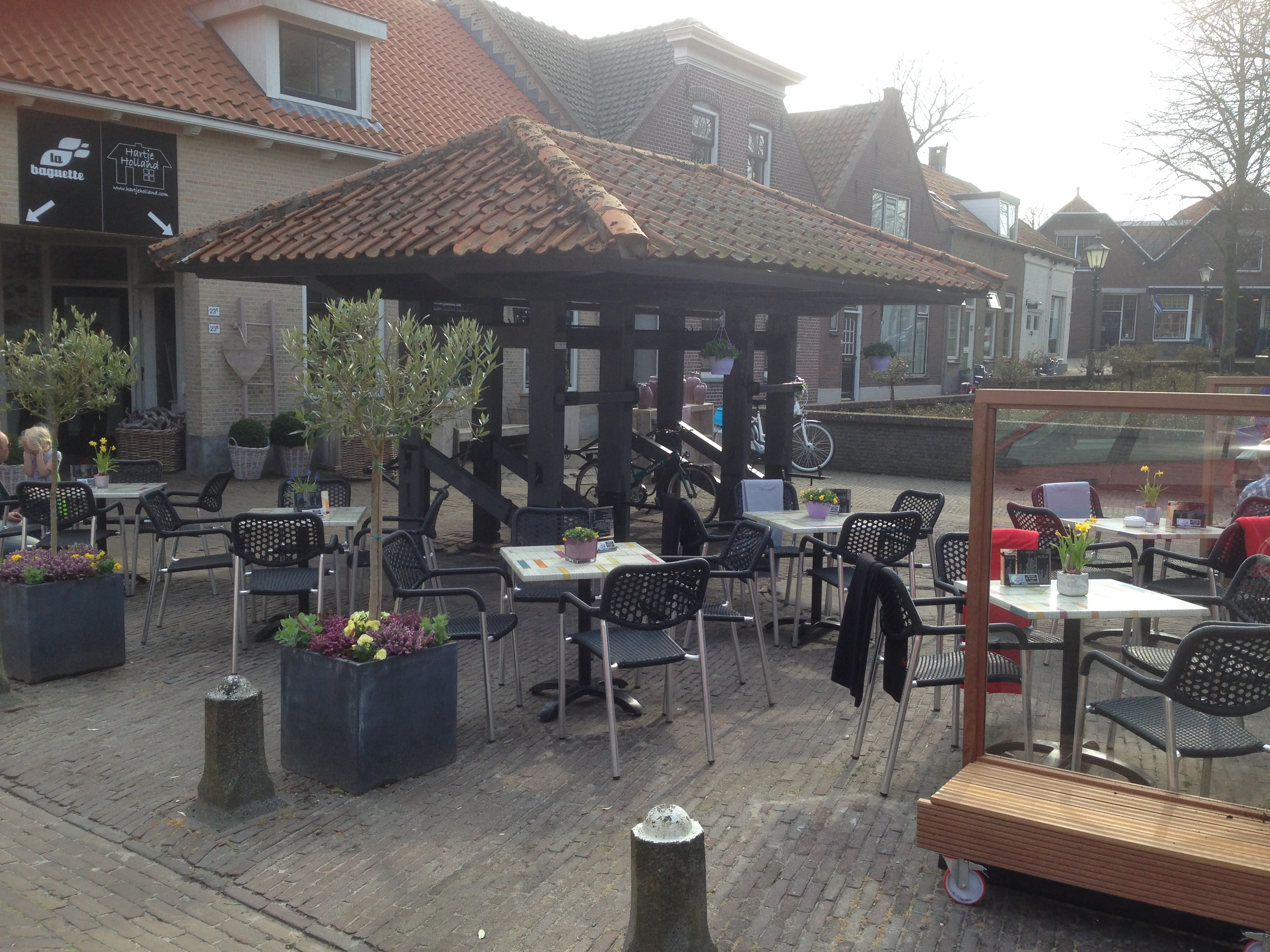
Former forge of Haamstede

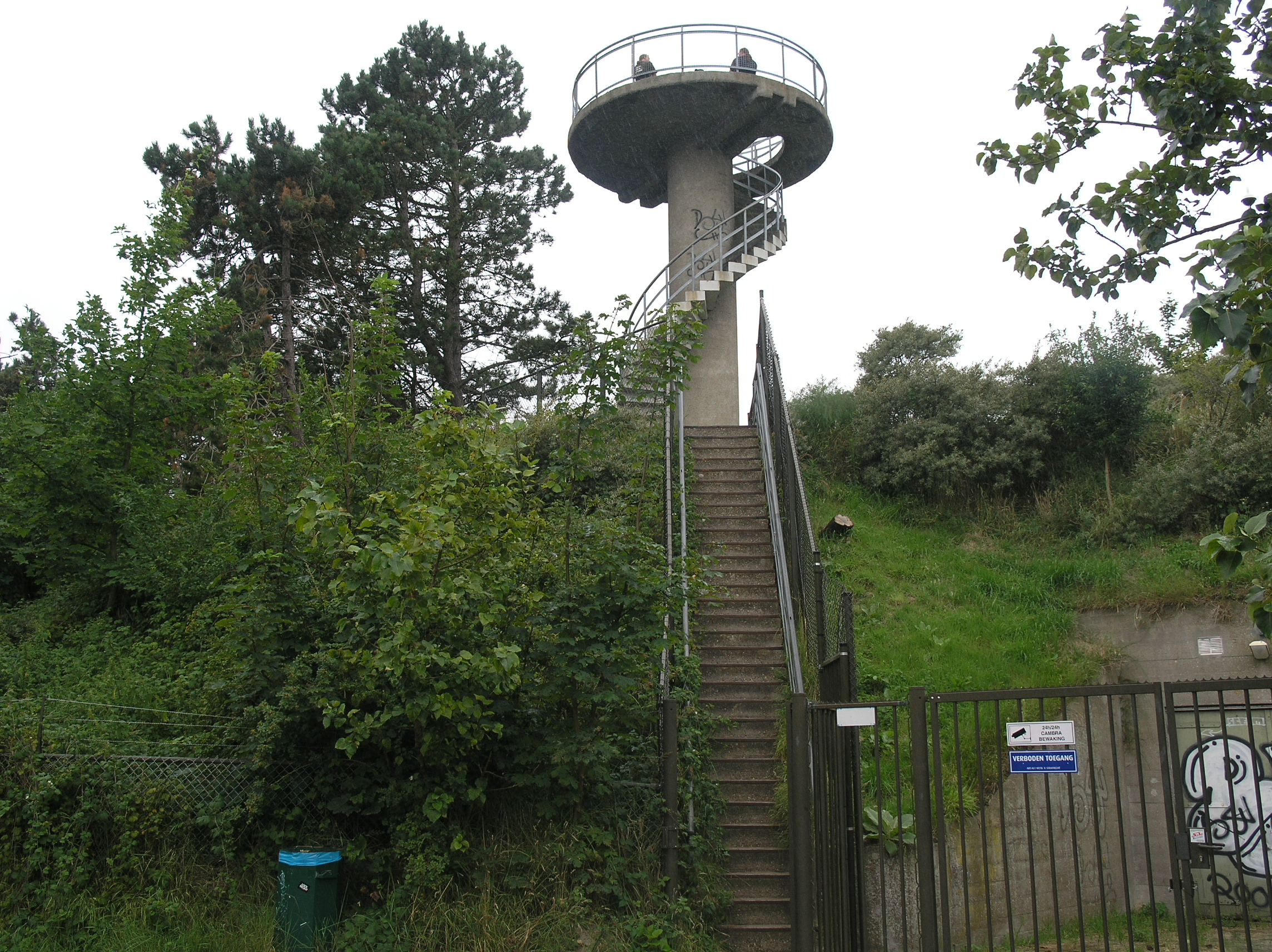
Former water tower

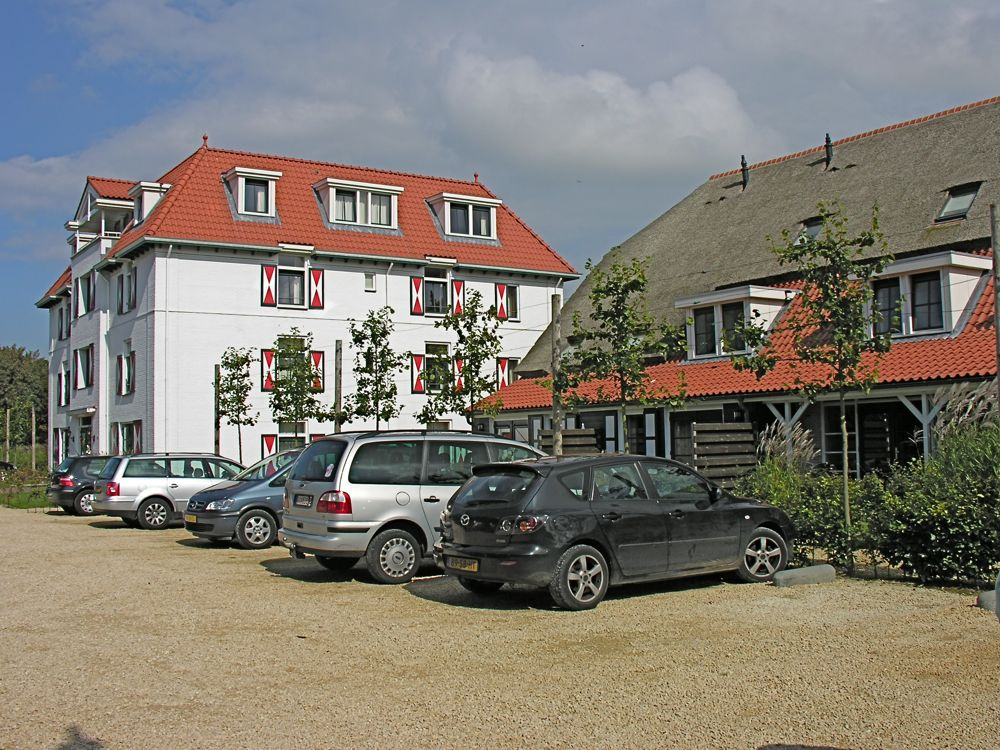
Hotel in Haamstede
