= Burgh, Netherlands =

Burgh
- Village
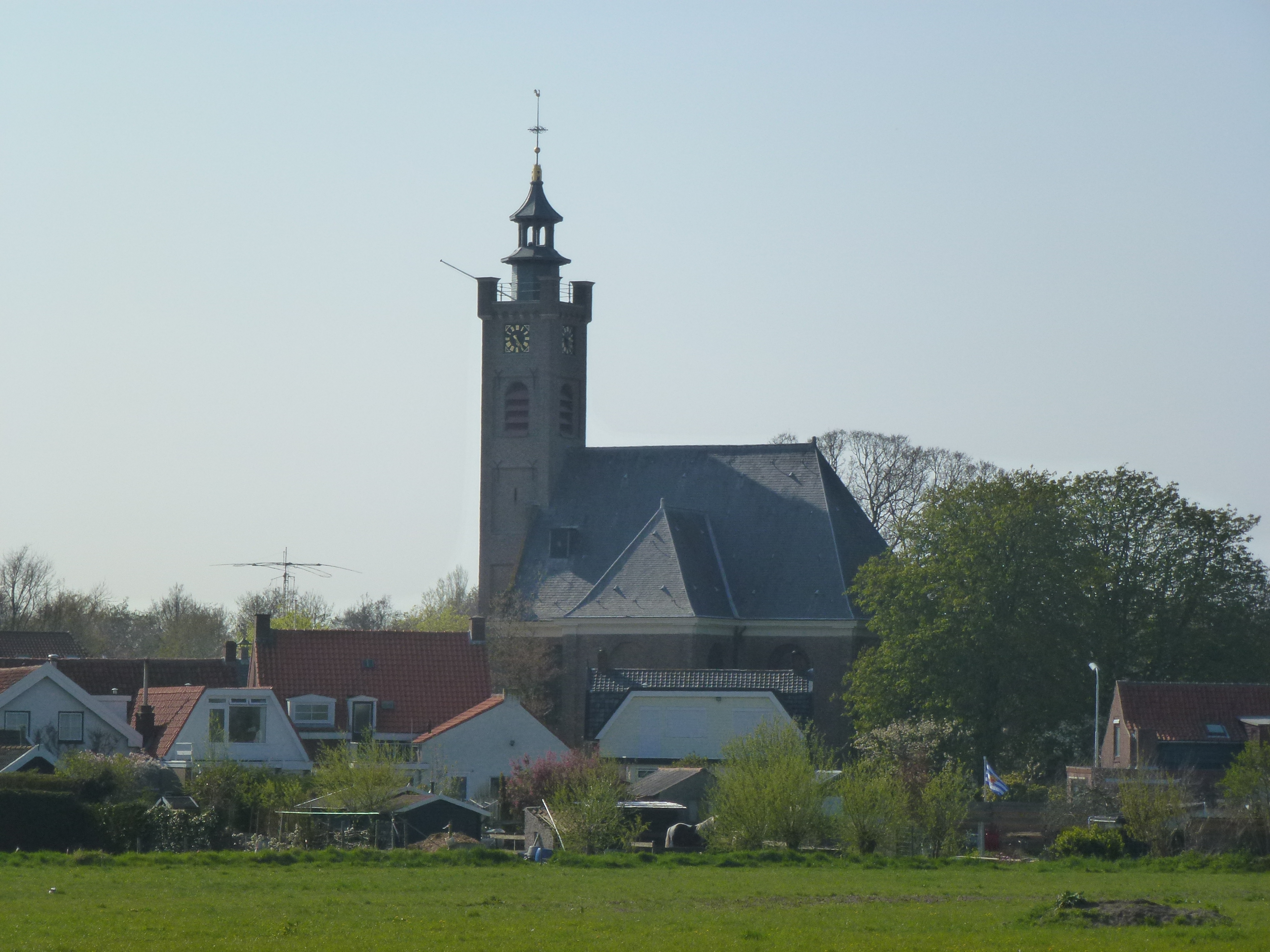
- View on the church

- Coat of arms

- Location in the province of Zeeland in the Netherlands Burgh (Netherlands)
- Coordinates: 51°41′19″N 3°43′45″E
- Country: Netherlands
- Province: Zeeland
- Municipality: Schouwen-Duiveland

Area
  - Total: 0.63 km^{2} (0.24 sq mi)
- Elevation: 3.0 m (9.8 ft)

Population (2021)
  - Total: 730
  - Density: 1,200/km^{2} (3,000/sq mi)
- Time zone: UTC+1 (CET)
  - Summer (DST): UTC+2 (CEST)
- Postal code: 4328
- Dialing code: 0111

Burgh is a village in the Dutch province of Zeeland. It is connected to Haamstede, and therefore generally considered to be part of the village Burgh-Haamstede.

== Geography ==
Burgh is a part of the municipality of Schouwen-Duiveland, and lies about 23 km north of Middelburg. The statistical area "Burgh", which also can include the surrounding countryside, has a population of around 1200.

Tourism is very important in Burgh, as it is in nearby Haamstede. Agriculture and fishery are also of some importance.

== History ==
Canon of Zeeland, 4: Ringwalburg Burgh, c. 885

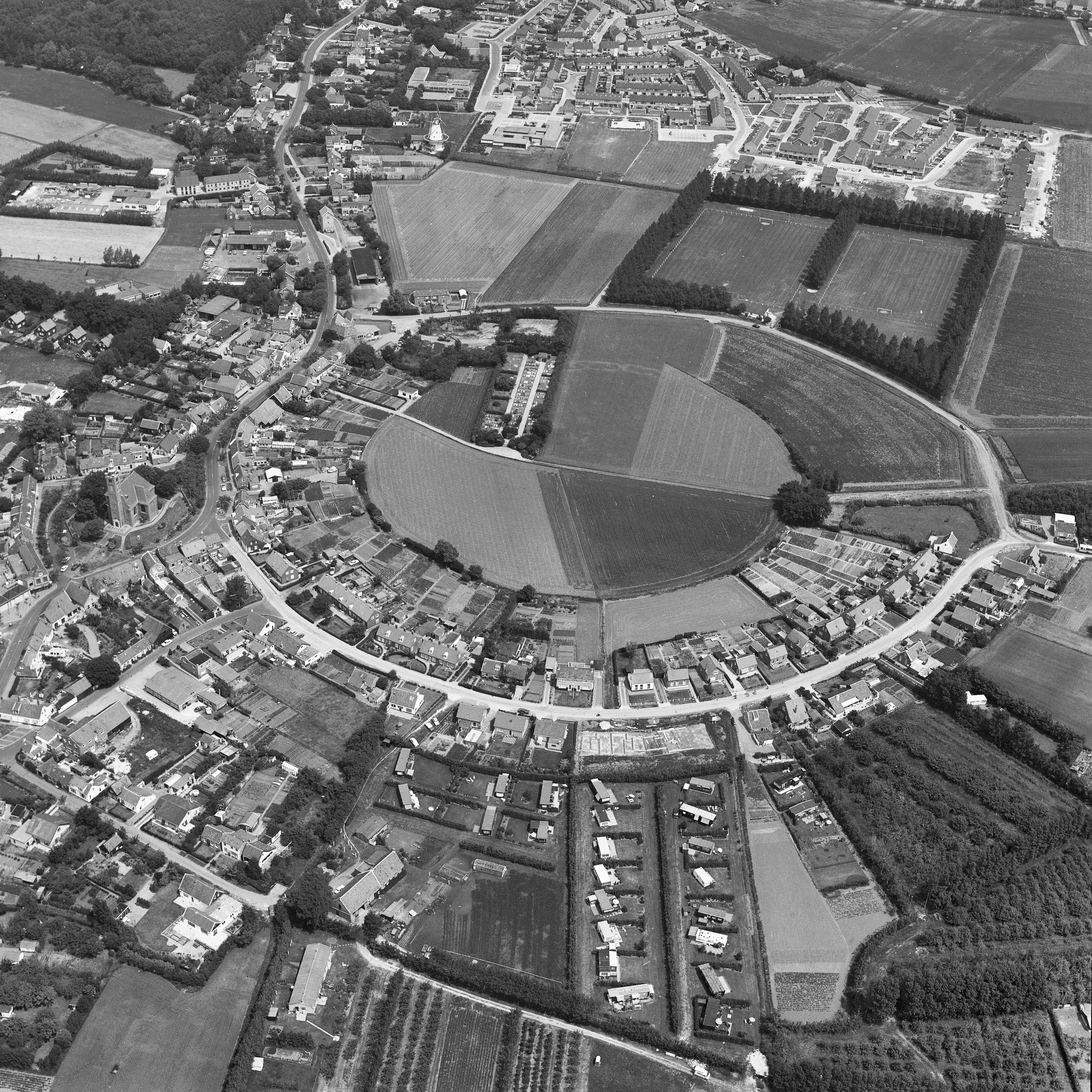
The fortress before restoration

Burgh was founded as an earthen fortification constructed near the end of the ninth century. It can be called a burh, a circular rampart or a Viking ring fortress. Fact is that it closely resembles a Viking ring fortress. The diameter of the restored fortress is 185 m. Between 2001 and 2007 the fortification of Burgh was partially restored.

Burgh used to be a separate municipality. In 1816 it came to include the smaller village Westenschouwen. In 1961 Burgh was merged with Haamstede, Noordwelle, Renesse and Serooskerke to form the municipality Westerschouwen. In turn this municipality was merged into Schouwen-Duiveland municipality in 1997.

During World War II Burgh was very often bombarded. In 1945 the church of Burgh was hit by a precision bombardment. The North Sea flood of 1953 did heavy damage in Burgh.
