= List of protected heritage sites in Orp-Jauche =

This table shows an overview of the protected heritage sites in the Walloon town Orp-Jauche. This list is part of Belgium's national heritage.

Object	Year/architect	Town/section	Address	Coordinates	Number^{?}	Image
The farm Le Cerf ou Hicquet and surrounding area ^{(nl)} ^{(fr)}		Orp-Jauche		50.657570°N 4.977776°E	25120-CLT-0001-01 Info	
Church of Saint-Pierre ^{(nl)} ^{(fr)}		Orp-Jauche		50.674173°N 4.979341°E	25120-CLT-0002-01 Info	Kerk Saint-Pierre
The facade and two towers of the castle of Jauche ^{(nl)} ^{(fr)}		Orp-Jauche		50.681812°N 4.955240°E	25120-CLT-0003-01 Info	De voorgevel en de twee torens van het kasteel van Jauche
Tower at the entrance of the house ^{(nl)} ^{(fr)}		Orp-Jauche	rue de la Cure n°11	50.681563°N 4.952930°E	25120-CLT-0004-01 Info	
St. Martin's Church ^{(nl)} ^{(fr)}		Orp-Jauche		50.707572°N 4.953006°E	25120-CLT-0005-01 Info	Kerk Saint-Martin
Church of Saints-Martin-et-Adele ^{(nl)} ^{(fr)}		Orp-Jauche		50.703243°N 4.991252°E	25120-CLT-0006-01 Info	Kerk Saints-Martin-et-Adèle
Choir and sacristy of the chapel of Notre-Dame ^{(nl)} ^{(fr)}		Orp-Jauche		50.700651°N 4.981759°E	25120-CLT-0007-01 Info	
Caves of Folx-les-Caves and surrounding area ^{(nl)} ^{(fr)}		Orp-Jauche		50.666934°N 4.938891°E	25120-CLT-0008-01 Info	
The old underground quarries of Folx-les-Caves ^{(nl)} ^{(fr)}		Folx-les-Caves		50.666934°N 4.938891°E	25120-PEX-0001-01 Info	

== See also ==
- Lists of protected heritage sites in Walloon Brabant
- Orp-Jauche
