= Malle =

- Municipality
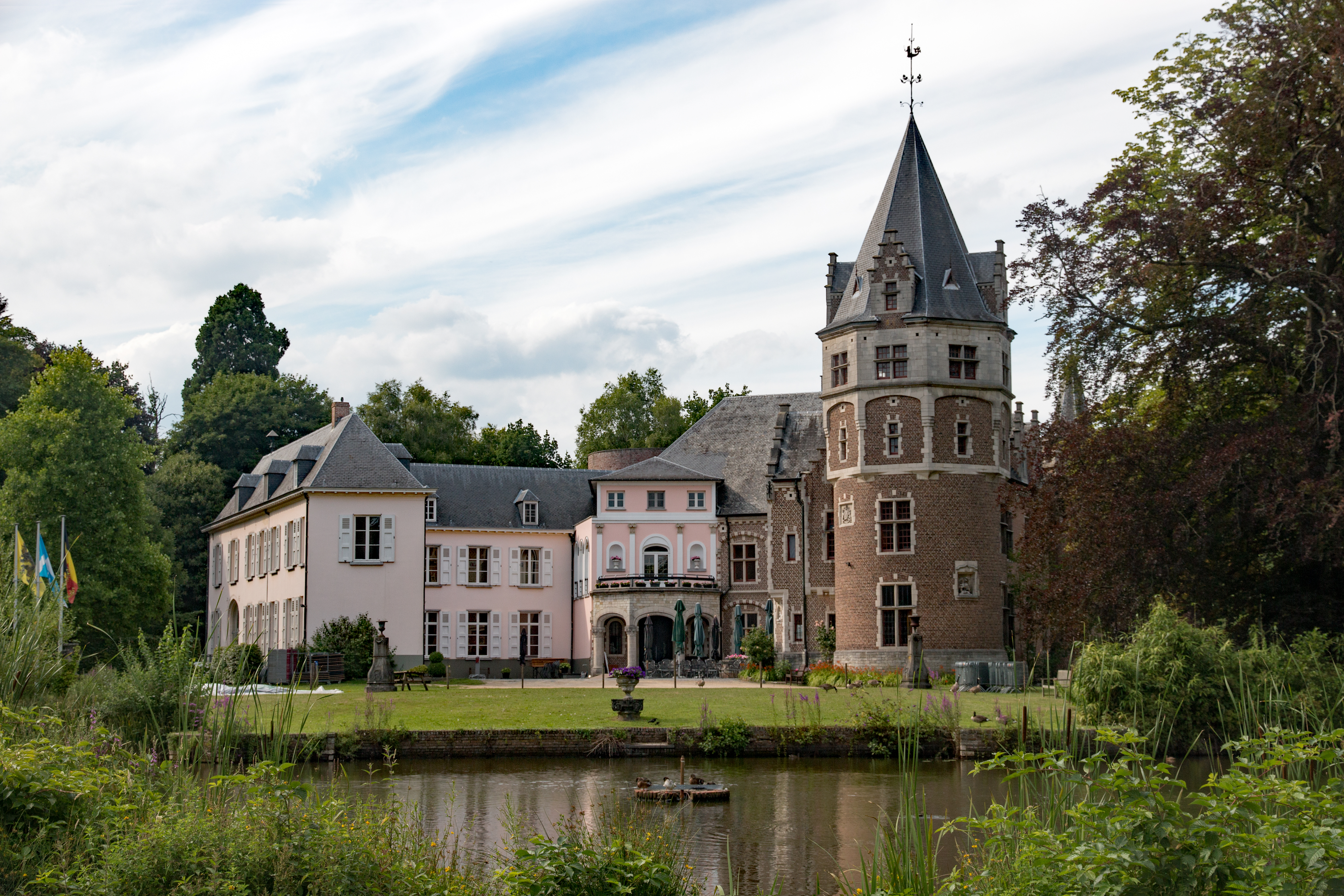

- Flag Coat of arms

- Location of Malle in the province of Antwerp
- Interactive map of Malle
- Location in Belgium
- Coordinates: 51°17′N 04°41′E
- Country: Belgium
- Community: Flemish Community
- Region: Flemish Region
- Province: Antwerp
- Arrondissement: Antwerp

Government
  - Mayor: Sanne Van Looy (N-VA)
  - Governing parties: DBM, N-VA

Area
  - Total: 51.9 km^{2} (20.0 sq mi)

Population (2020-01-01)
  - Total: 15,602
  - Density: 301/km^{2} (779/sq mi)
- Postal codes: 2390
- NIS code: 11057
- Area codes: 03
- Website: www.malle.be

Malle (Dutch pronunciation: [ˈmɑlə]) is a municipality located in the Campine region of the Belgian province of Antwerp. The municipality comprises the villages of Oostmalle and Westmalle. In 2021, Malle had a total population of 15,620. The total area is 51.99 km^{2}.

== History ==
=== Early history ===
The origin and meaning of the word Malle is uncertain: on the one hand it could refer to an extended plain, border or stop, but more likely it refers to a place which was used by the Franks for legal matters. A Mallum was a general court session presided by the count. In Irish, the name Ó Maoileoin, means a devotee of St. John.

A record of the name Malle emerges for the first time in 1194, when the bishop of Kamerijk donated the altar of Malle and Vorsele to the Chapter of Our Kind Lady of Antwerp. Originally Oostmalle, Westmalle and Zoersel were joined into one domain: Malle, which was part of the County Toxandria.

The origin of Oostmalle dates back to the Roman era, when a settlement was built along the Roman road from Trajectum ad Rhenum (Utrecht) to Bavay (now approximately the Lierselei and the Hoogstraatsebaan).

During the Middle Ages (476–1492), Oostmalle was part of the Duchy of Brabant, governed by lords like Jan Van Hesselbeke and Jan Volckaert (around 1300). The lower feudal rights belonged to the House of Breda, the higher rights belonged to the Duke of Brabant.

Westmalle's origin dates to before 1100, when the place of residence (Mansus) of the representative (Villicus or Meier) of the Duke of Brabant was mentioned in historical record. The history of Westmalle Castle reflects the history of the governing families of Westmalle. Henry I, Duke of Brabant granted some feudal rights to the abbot of the Abbey of Villers on the condition that a monastery would be built in Westmalle. However, the monastery was built in Hemiksem instead.

=== Separation of Malle ===
In the first half of the 13th century Malle was separated when the County of Strijen was divided; Oostmalle came to belong to the County of Breda, Westmalle and Zoersel remained with the Duchy of Brabant. Westmalle was governed by a local Meier belonging subsequently to the families van der Moelen, de Cotereau en Powis and also by the Abbot of the Abbey of Villers. About 1300 the feudal rights of Oostmalle were divided between Jan van Hesselbeke and Jacobus van Dworp. Jan Volkaert I, was married with the daughter of the Jan van Hesselbeke. He owned half of the feudal rights of Oostmalle, while the other half was owned by his brother-in-law Jacob van Couree. Later on the feudal rights went to the Lords of Berchem. Between 1431 and 1464 Willem van Berchem built a castle in Oostmalle. By the end of the 16th century, from 1602 onwards, during the entire Ancien Régime, all feudal rights of Oostmalle belonged to the family van Renesse (French: de Renesse), descendants of Jan van Renesse.

=== 16th to 18th century ===
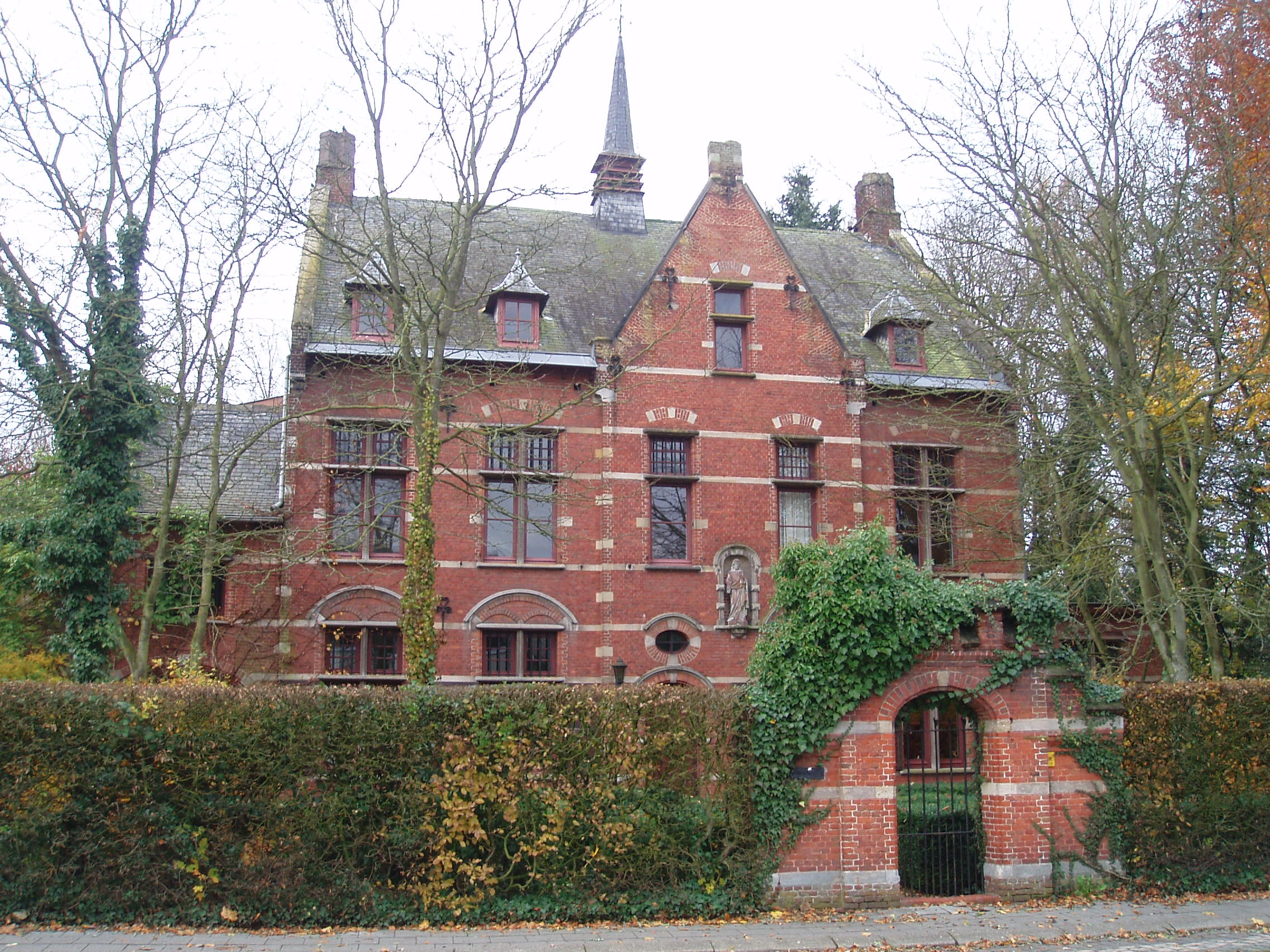
Villa Wildzang in Westmalle

Almost continuously the Campine villages were plundered and besieged; foreign troops caused severe havoc, and also brought with them diseases like the Bubonic plague. Oostmalle suffered most from the plague between 1575 and 1605.

In 1542, during the wars of Charles of Guelders against Charles V, Oostmalle and Renesse Castle were destroyed by the troops of Maarten van Rossum. The entire region suffered severely during the Eighty Years War, between the Protestant north of the Low Countries and the Spanish-controlled Southern Netherlands.

During the 1580s, only 23 families survived in Westmalle and they had to hide for four years at Westmalle Castle because of the Spanish troops, who were ravaging the region. During the 17th century the region suffered from several attacks from the Dutch Republic. Around 1620, Croatian (In old Flemish: Krawaten) soldiers of the Spanish army occupied Malle. In 1626 a Chapel of Saint Anthony was built in Salphen for people from Oostmalle who fled their village to escape the plague. At the end of the 17th century, during the Dutch War (1672–1678) Westmalle was almost entirely burned to ashes.

At the start of the 18th century, the region suffered during the War of the Spanish Succession when French troops occupied Malle in 1703. Following the French Revolutionary Wars the Austrian Netherlands were invaded and annexed by the First French Republic in 1792. Shortly after the invasion of the French army, an epidemic of dysentery hit Malle.

=== Modern era ===
After the defeat of Napoleon I of France in 1814, Cossacks occupied Malle and plundered the village. Only after the Dutch rule during the period of the United Kingdom of the Netherlands (1815–1830) and the establishment of the kingdom of Belgium, came a period of increasing prosperity for the region. In 1885 Oostmalle became the centre for the Tram network of the region, which would last until 1962. During World War I and World War II Malle escaped severe damage. On 25 June 1967, Oostmalle was hit by a tornado which destroyed the church and 135 houses.

On 1 January 1977 Oostmalle and Westmalle were reunited, first under the name Westmalle, and since 30 June 1979 under the original name Malle.

== Tourism ==
Important curiosities in Malle include the Trappist Abbey of Westmalle and its brewery, Renesse Castle, the Scherpenberg mill, Westmalle Castle which dates back to 1100, and the Castle of Blommerschot. The Chapel of Our Lady of Perpetual Help (Dutch: Onze-Lieve-Vrouw van Bijstand) at the Herentalsebaan was built by Leonard Pierre Joseph du Bus de Gisignies in 1837. In 1930 a Lourdes cave was added to the chapel (inaugurated on 7 May 1933), and in 1934 a Stations of the Cross was added in remembrance of King Albert I of Belgium. The sculptor of the latter was Simon Gossens.

Malle has three churches: the Church of Saint Lawrence (Dutch: Sint Laurentius, Oostmalle), the Church of Saint Paul (Dutch: Sint Paulus, Westmalle) and the Church of Saint Martin (Dutch: Sint Martinus, Westmalle). The most important local festival is called "Salphenkermis", which is held in the hamlet Salphen in honor of Saint Anthony.

The forests of Herenbos, Molenbos (Drieboomkesberg), Bruulbergen and Schrabbenbos are also worth a visit.

== Twin towns ==
Malle is linked to the following towns as twin towns, also known as partner towns:

- France: Saint-Savin
- Germany: Heusenstamm
- Poland: Zakrzówek, Lublin Voivodeship
- United Kingdom: Hartley Wintney

== Economy ==
=== History ===
Malle is located in the Campine (Dutch: Kempen) region, which historically was not densely populated, and consisted of enormous heaths and marshlands, interrupted by woods and swampland. Since the Middle Ages the majority of the land in the Campine has been cultivated.

Until the 18th century Oostmalle was known for its black pottery, such as "Lollepotten" which were small stoves used for room heating in winter.

=== Modern era ===
Nowadays, Malle is a regional economic centre. It is home to several companies like ETAP Lighting, ETAP Yachting, Ecover, and Meubelfabrieken Karel Mintjens (among the TOP500 of the Belgian Companies).

== Notable inhabitants ==
- May Claerhout, sculptor
- Viscount Leonard Pierre Joseph du Bus de Gisignies (1780–1849)
- Maria Rosseels (1916–2005), journalist and writer
- Godfroy Lenaerts, ground owner and landlord (1925–2006)

== Evolution of inhabitants ==
=== After merger ===
Year	1977	1980	1985	1990	1995	2000	2005	2006
Inhabitants	9798	10.520	11.353	12.096	13.301	13.922	14.150	14.083
Remark:Inhabitaints on 01/01 – Bron:NIS

== See also ==
- Monasterium Magnificat
