= Serooskerke, Schouwen-Duiveland =

Serooskerke
- Village
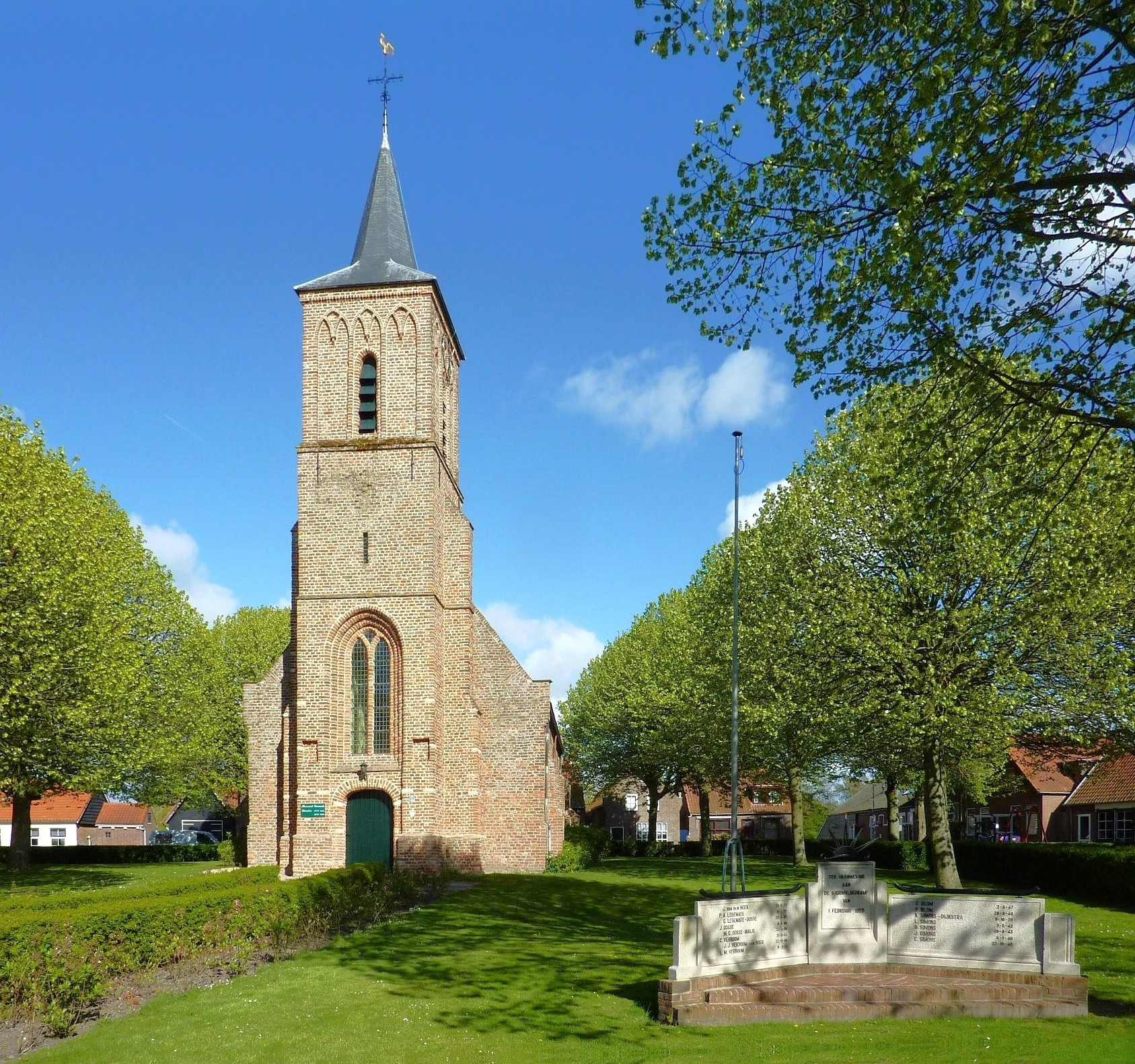
- Alards Church

- Flag Coat of arms

- Location in the province of Zeeland in the Netherlands Serooskerke (Netherlands)
- Coordinates: 51°42′4″N 3°48′53″E
- Country: Netherlands
- Province: Zeeland
- Municipality: Schouwen-Duiveland

Area
  - Total: 4.31 km^{2} (1.66 sq mi)
- Elevation: −0.6 m (−2.0 ft)

Population (2021)
  - Total: 265
  - Density: 61.5/km^{2} (159/sq mi)
- Time zone: UTC+1 (CET)
  - Summer (DST): UTC+2 (CEST)
- Postal code: 4327
- Dialing code: 0111

Serooskerke is a village in the southwest Netherlands. It is located in the municipality of Schouwen-Duiveland, Zeeland about 100 km southwest of Rotterdam.

== History ==
The village was first mentioned in 1395 or 1396 as Ecclesia Alardi, and means "(private) church of Lord Alard (person)". Serooskerke is a church village which developed on a ridge around a church. It used to be a heerlijkheid of the Van Tuyll van Serooskerke family.

The Dutch Reformed church is a single-aisled building. The tower dates from the 15th century. The church burnt down in 1576 and was partially rebuilt using material from the old church. In 1958, it was restored and the leaning tower was straightened.

Serooskerke was home to 290 people in 1840. In 1903, a harbour was constructed for the transportation of sugar beet.

Serooskerke was severely damaged during the North Sea flood of 1953, and 15 people died. The hole in the dike was not big, but started to extend and was 520 metres wide by Augustus 1953. A new ring dike was constructed around the village and the gaps were closed with caissons. The old dike was never restored and the hole is still visible.

On 1 January 1961, the municipality of Serooskerke merged with the neighboring municipalities of Burgh, Haamstede, Noordwelle, and Renesse to form the municipality of Westenschouwen. On Januari 1997 Westenschouwen merged into the newly formed municipality of Schouwen-Duiveland that is identical in name and area to the island on which Serooskerke is located.

== Gallery ==
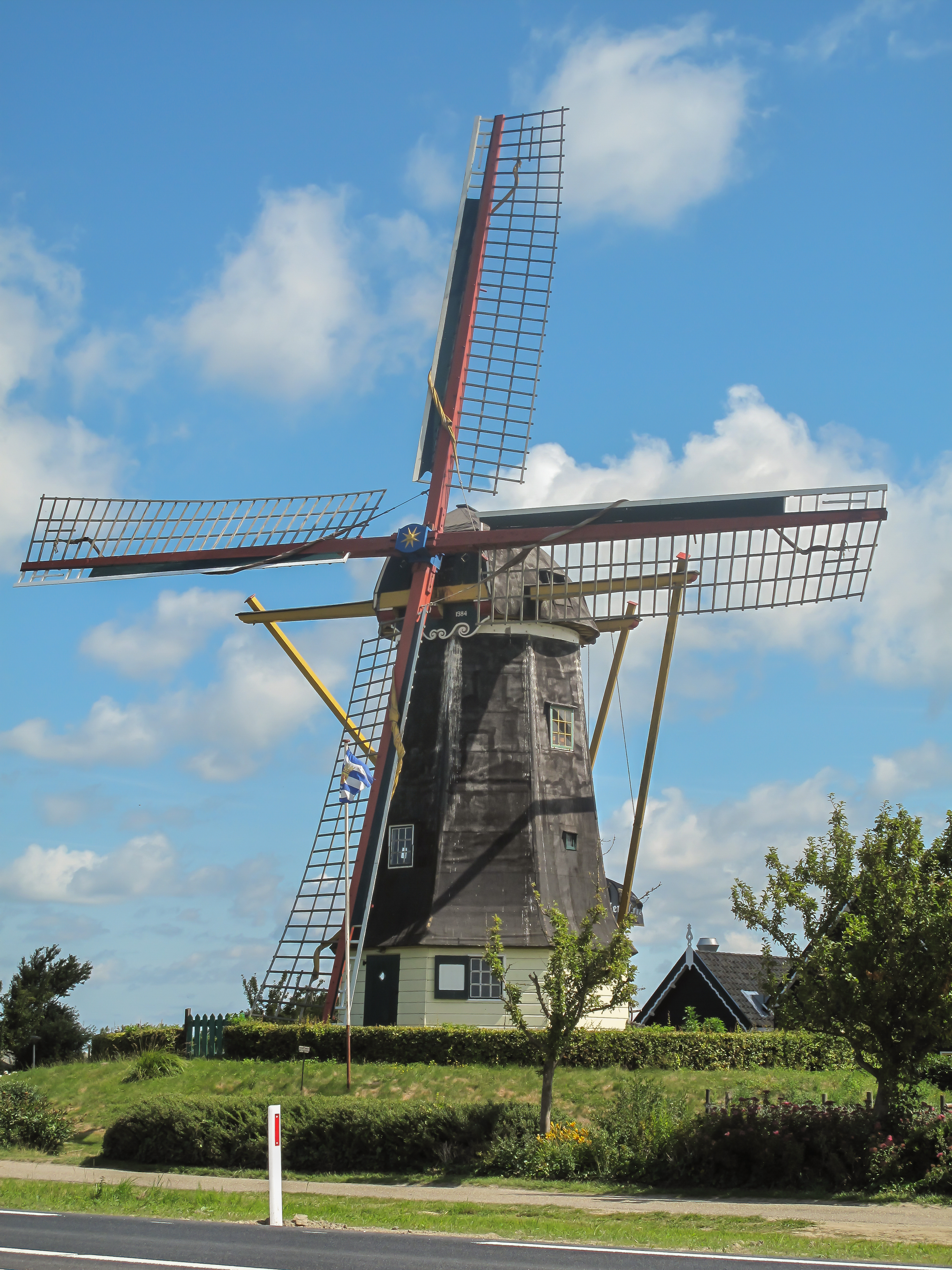
Serooskerke, windmill

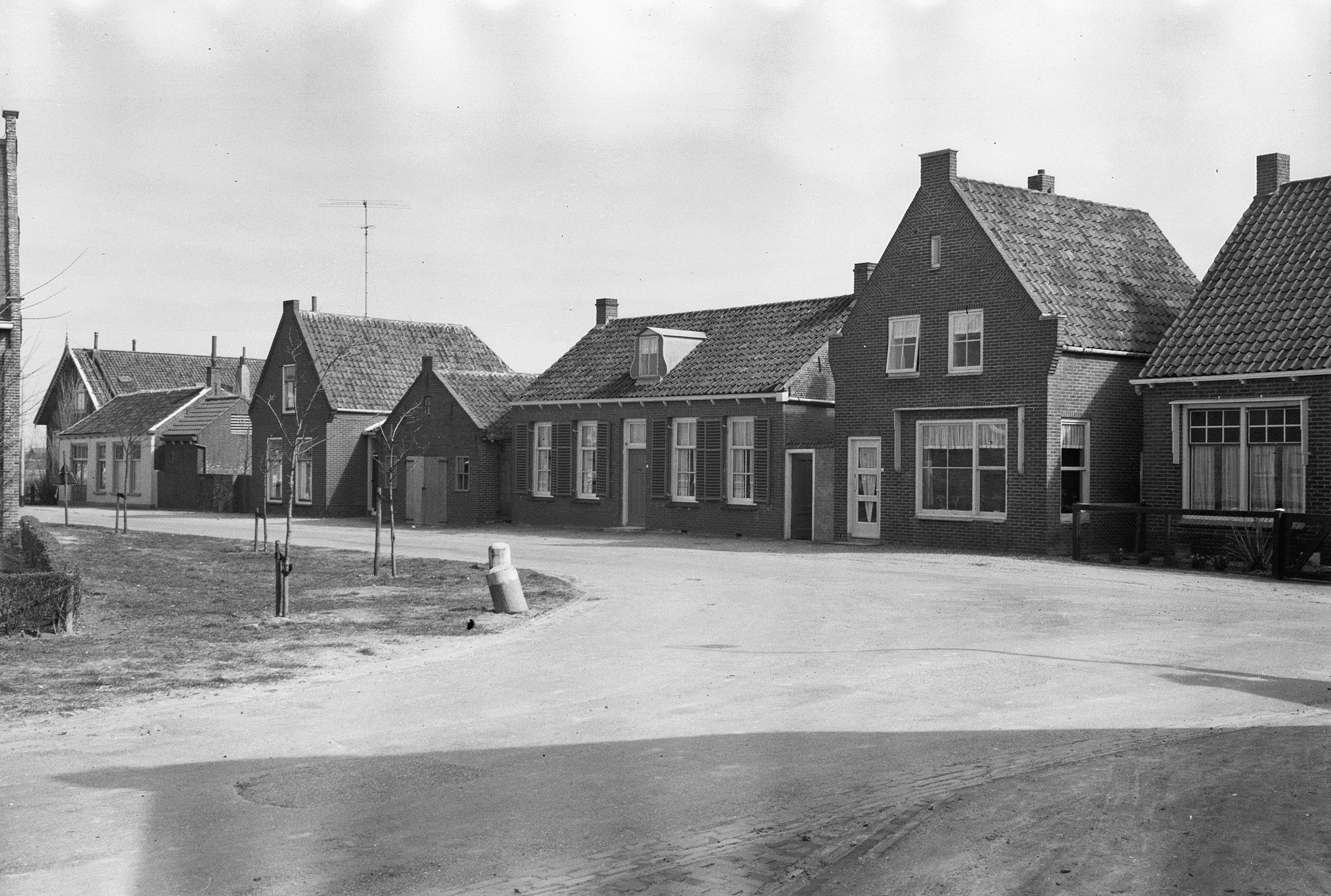
Houses in Serooskerke

== People from Serooskerke ==
- Johannes van de Velde Olivier, printer, publisher and bookseller in Zierikzee
