= Serooskerke =

Serooskerke is the name of two villages in Zeeland, Netherlands:

- Serooskerke, Schouwen-Duiveland
- Serooskerke, Walcheren

== See also ==
- Tuyll, a Dutch noble family whose full name is Van Tuyll van Serooskerken
