= Renesse Castle =

Castle in Belgium

Coordinates: 51.3005°N 4.728°E

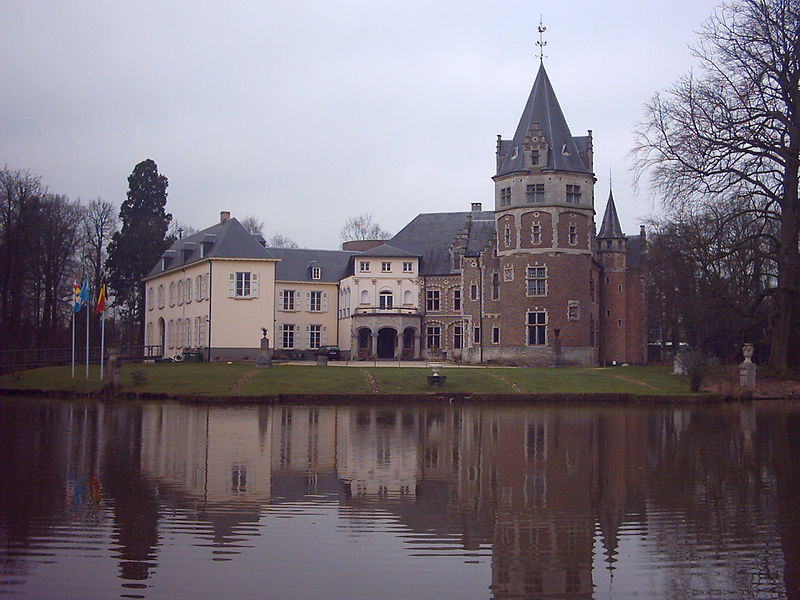
Front view of the Castle de Renesse

The Castle de Renesse is a castle located in the village of Oostmalle (Malle), in the Campine region of the province of Antwerp (Flanders, Belgium). It is currently owned by the municipality of Malle.

== History ==
=== 14th century ===
In 1374 Jan van Harduemont sold his domain in Oostmalle to Costijn van Berchem, a descendant of Arnoldus Berchthout, who lived near Antwerp.

=== 1431–1464: Construction of the first castle by Willem van Berchem ===
Willem van Berchem, who himself lived at Wommelgem, built a castle at Oostmalle between 1431 and 1464. He was married to Mechtildis Cock van Werdenborgh. Nothing remains of this original castle, and the only remaining visible vestiges are the donjon which now is the articulation point of the castle and the so-called tournament beam which is now placed above the fireplace in the knight room. In 1459 his daughter Elisabeth married Wouter van Hamal, who thereby inherited the Oostmalle domain, and added vast property in present-day provinces of Limburg and Liège.

On 30 November 1501, their daughter Anna van Hamal married Frederik van Renesse (b. 13 March 1470), descendant of a Diederick VI, 12th count of Holland and Sophie van Rheinick. He was Drossaard of Diest and Breda, Councilor of Charles V, Holy Roman Emperor and stadtholder of the Netherlands, Zeeland and Friesland. After his death in 1538, he was succeeded by his son Jan van Renesse who married Elisabeth van Nassau, an illegitimate daughter of Henry III of Nassau-Breda, who was an uncle of William the Silent.

=== 1542: Devastation of the Castle ===
In 1542, William Duke of Guelder rose against Emperor Charles V. His troops were led by Maarten van Rossum, notorious for his pillage of the Campine region. The village of Oostmalle and most of the castle were burned to ashes. Only the main tower of the castle and the church tower of Oostmalle remained intact.

=== 1545–1548: a new castle is built by Jan VIII van Renesse ===
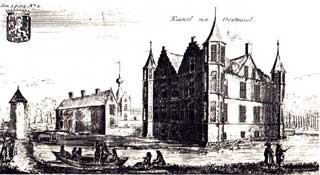
Castle de Renesse around 1680. Engraving published in the Notitia Marchionatus of baron Jacobus (Jacques) Le Roy.

A new castle was built after the destruction of the original van Berchem castle. The remaining tower was incorporated in the horseshoe-shaped service buildings (neerhof), and a bridge connected the neerhof (E: lesser court) with the opperhof (E: main court). The main building of the castle was built as a square with four towers at each corner. The roof was covered with tiles and the towers with gold coloured slate. Some famous guests who stayed at the castle were emperor Charles V (1545, 1548), Margaret of Parma (1561), Lamoral, Count of Egmont and his wife, William I of Orange-Nassau, to name a few. On 28 July 1561, Frederik van Renesse succeeded his father as Lord of Oostmalle, he married Helena Torck.

The struggle between the Protestant north of the Netherlands and the Spanish-controlled Southern Netherlands, left its marks on the region and Oostmalle suffered severely from the Eighty Years War. The occupation of the castle during the Eighty Years War by soldiers (1538–1603) did no good to the state of the castle. Fernando Álvarez de Toledo, 3rd Duke of Alba even confiscated the property of Frederik van Renesse for a while.

Willem van Renesse, married to Margaretha van der Aa van Renesse, son of Frederik, was the last occupant of the castle. After he died in 1630, the family moved to Elderen in Limburg. In 1700, Count Francis Hyacinthus van Renesse, allowed secretary Peter De Jonghe to live in the service building. Around 1730 Frans Lambrechts van Renesse married Carolina van Breidbach Burrescheim.

=== 1790–1800: Decline and demolition ===
Over the years, the main building decayed slowly, because of a lack of funding for maintenance and repairs. In 1729, N. Spirlet became scout, stadtholder and steward of Oostmalle. Spirlet did his best to manage the property as well as possible, but eventually, without success. In 1793, the main building of the castle was demolished and between 1778 and 1830 the farm was also destroyed.

=== 1830: The beginning of a new era ===
On 6 October 1830, Count Clement-Wenceslas de Renesse-Breidbach sold the castle and the domain to Viscount Leonard Pierre Joseph du Bus de Gisignies, who had been commissioner-general of the Dutch East Indies, for the United Kingdom of the Netherlands, and afterwards was appointed Minister of State by William I of the Netherlands.

Léonard du Bus de Gisignies renovated the old service building into a country house with large windows and redesigned the interiors in Empire style. The neighbouring field was transformed into an English garden with distinctive trees such as sequoias. His grandson Bernard Daniel, son of the famous ornithologist Bernard du Bus de Gisignies, would live in the castle and become mayor burgomaster of Oostmalle.

In 1896, Isabelle, the only daughter of Viscount Bernard Daniel du Bus de Gisignies (1832–1917), the oldest du Bus-heir, married Count Maximilian de Renesse-Breidbach. Shortly after the birth of their sixth child, Isabelle died. Maximilian then married Godelieve, the only daughter of Viscount Chretien du Bus de Gisignies (1845–1883), younger brother of Bernard Daniel, and together they had seven children.

=== 1920: Twentieth century, redesign of the castle ===
After World War I, Maximilian started rebuilding the castle in Flemish Neo-renaissance style. However, construction was stopped after completion of the right wing of the castle. The 16th-century left wing remained as it was, but was no longer used to live in.

During both World War I and World War II, the German military occupied the castle. On 15 March 1941 a British bombardment destroyed part of the left wing of the castle. Towards the end of the war, in 1944, the castle was used by British and Canadian forces as a hospital. The tornado that devastated Oostmalle on 25 June 1967 spared the castle, but the damage in the park remains visible until today. Count Thierry de Renesse-Breidbach, who had been mayor of Oostmalle since 1933, died on 24 October 1973. Ever since his marriage with Clara Van Gelder, he no longer lived at the castle and had been contemplating selling the castle to the village of Oostmalle. It took until after the union of Oostmalle and Westmalle in 1977, before the castle was acquired by Malle.

On 16 May 1983 the castle and the domain were acquired by the municipality of Malle. Since 25 March 1985, the castle and its surroundings have been owned by Domein de Renesse, a non-profit organization responsible for the administration of the castle, and is now being used as a museum, for cultural activities and concerts.

== See also ==
- Jan van Renesse
- Camille de Renesse
- Renesse
- List of castles in Belgium

== Sources ==
- Heemkundige Kring van Malle, Jaarboek – 1985, pp. 93–156
- Domein De Renesse
