= Westmalle Castle =

Belgian Castle

Coordinates: 51.3061°N 4.6952°E

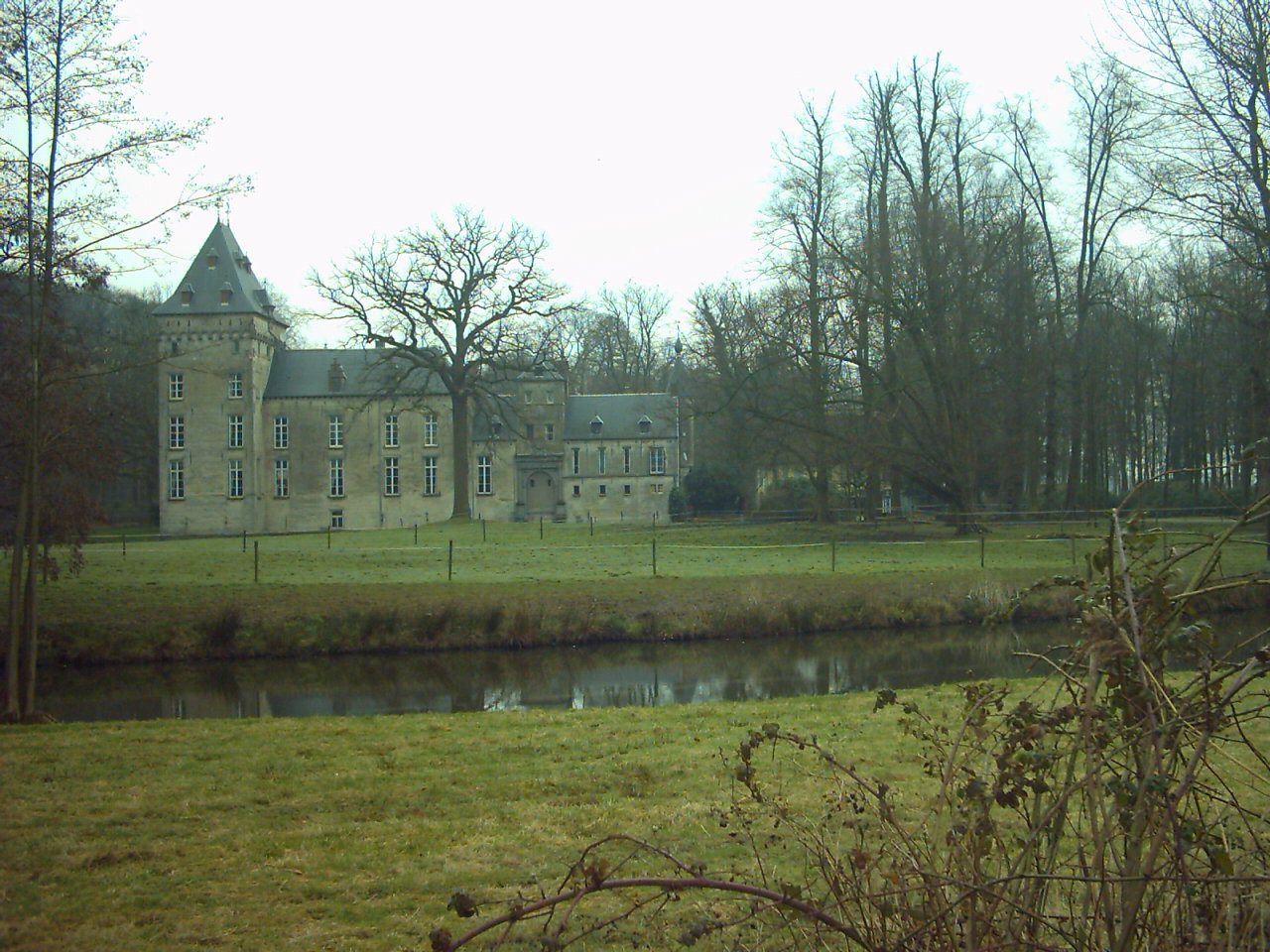
View of the castle and the round building on the right

Westmalle Castle (Dutch: Kasteel Westmalle) is located in the village of Westmalle, which is part of the municipality of Malle in the Campine region of Flanders, Belgium. Westmalle Castle is situated at an elevation of 29 meters.

== History ==
The origin of Westmalle Castle goes back to a large fortified farm, the Mansus de Trisco (Dutch: Hoeve Ten Driessche) around 1100 and it stayed that way until 1449. The farm was the residence of the representatives of the Dukes of Brabant.

In 1449 the estate was sold by the Duke of Brabant to Henri van der Moelen, who was a member of the city council of Antwerp. In 1505, his son, the knight Hendrik van der Moelen, obtained all feudal rights from Philip I of Castile. His son Peter van der Moelen succeeded him and it was his grandson, Evrard de Cottereau, who obtained the estate in 1530.

The estate passed to the De Cottereau family by marriage, and it was Evrard de Cottereau who built the present castle in 1561. In 1695 the last of the Cottereaus was deeply indebted to his creditor, Pierre Farisau, and later to his heir Filips Robijns. In 1702 the castle was claimed by the creditors, but the courts returned the property to lady Moytray, the widow of de Cottereau. In 1738, her brother inherited the castle and sold it to the heirs of Filips Robijns who sold it again to Jacques Benoit Pauwens (Powis) in 1743, whose family resided in the castle until 1847. In 1829, Baron de Norman restored the castle. His children sold it to the Bovie family from Antwerp.

Between 1848 and 1874 the castle was owned by an Antwerp diamond-dealer, Lord Bovie. He altered and restored the castle, and a garden was created by the landscape architect Koelich. From 1874 until 1878, the castle belonged to Louis Geelhand. Baron de Turck de Kersbeeck bought it in 1878, restored the building and parts were rebuilt by the architect Schadde. Since 1914 the castle has been owned by the van der Straten Waillet family. After Christiane van der Straten (née de Lannoy) died at the age of 102 the castle was sold to Stichting Kempens landschap, a foundation for the protection of flemish landscapes and heritage.

== See also ==
- List of castles in Belgium

== Sources ==
- Malle history (in Dutch)
