= Camille of Renesse-Breidbach =

Belgian nobleman and author

Camille Maximilien Frédéric, Count de Renesse-Breidbach (9 July 1836 in Brussels – 12 June 1904 in Nice) was a Belgian nobleman, entrepreneur and author.

De Renesse was born in 1836 at Brussels to an aristocratical family of Dutch descent. His parents were Maximilien C.J.G.R van Renesse Breidbach and Berthe Walburge Francoise van Gruben. He was a grandson of Clement Wenceslas van Renesse Breidbach (1774–1833), who had sold the ancestral Castle of Renesse to Leonard du Bus de Gisignies.

Camille married Countess Malvina de Kerchhove de Deterghem on 10 November 1868, daughter of Count Charles-Constant de Kerchhove de Deterghem (1819–1882) and Eugénie de Limon (1824–1899). While dwelling in St. Moritz for recreation Count de Renesse got his vision to establish a giant Monte Carlo-like hotel resort with a grand hotel, baths and golf courses in the Engadin valley for the European aristocracy. After being rejected in Celerina, Sils and finally in St. Moritz due to the Badrutt family's huge power, Count de Renesse succeeded in purchasing some 140 hectares of land in Maloja, at the Lake of Sils.

Between 1882 and 1884 he put his vision to reality by letting build the Hôtel Kursaal de la Maloja (nowadays Maloja Palace). But since just a few days after the grand opening a cholera epidemic broke out in nearby Italy, Count de Renesse had to file for bankruptcy after six months. Furthermore, Countess Marvina died of a so-called "fat heart" in Basel in the same autumn. Nonetheless the hotel remained a lucrative location for Europe's rich people in the following decades. In 1891, Stanford University completed Encina Hall, a dormitory inspired by the Hôtel Kursaal de la Maloja's architecture.

For a long time a rumour has got abroad that Count de Renesse, being drunk, fell off his residence, the Belvedere tower above the hotel, into the Bergell valley; in fact he moved to Nice where he wrote some Christian books; there he died in 1904.

== Bibliography ==
- Jesus Christ: His Apostles and Disciples in the Twentieth Century

== See also ==
- Castle of Renesse
