= Westerschouwen =

Coordinates: 51°41′N 3°43′E

Westerschouwen is a former municipality in the Dutch province of Zeeland.

The municipality was formed in a merger of the municipalities Burgh, Haamstede, Noordwelle, Renesse, and Serooskerke on January 1, 1961. As the name indicates, it covered the western part of the island of Schouwen.

On January 1, 1997, Westerschouwen merged with Brouwershaven, Bruinisse, Duiveland, Middenschouwen, and Zierikzee to form the new municipality of Schouwen-Duiveland.
