= John II of Cottereau, Baron of Jauche =

Belgian city mayor

John of Cottereau (died 17 September 1561), baron of Jauche and lord of Assche, was mayor of the City of Brussels in 1534.

== Family and Descendants ==
He was born as the only son of John I of Cottereau, Baron of Jauche and Margueritte, Lady of Assche. He married in 1556 a second time to a lady in waiting of Mary of Hungary, Catherine de Brandenbourg, Lady of Steenockerzeel. He was buried in the family mausoleum of the church of Asse with his second wife.

His monument bore the inscription:

Generosus eques Joannes Cotereau, Baro Jauceanus, Dominus de Asscha et in Asscha, de Wydeu, de Releghem, et curiae foedorum Brabantiae locum tenens aequi amantissimus, divini cultus et reipublicae studiosissimus, relicta nobili Catharina de Brandenbourgh uxore altera amantissima cum tribus filiis et una filia, annos natus sexaginta et septem, defunctus est anno Domini 1561 mensis Septembris 17, Requiescat in pace. Restauratum per Dnam Catharinam Cotereau Marchionissam de et in Asscha viduam Dni Francisci Philippi Taye Marchionis de Wemmei anno Domini 1766

Children:

- John III de Cottereau, died without issue
- Guillaume I de Cottereau, 1st Marquess of Assche
- Philipp de Cottereau
- Valeria de Cottereau

Their descendants belong to the Belgian nobility.

== Career ==
On 29 April 1556, John received by Royal decree the right of Lord Baron of Jauche. He was member of the Seven Noble Houses of Brussels, and had an important career in the Duchy of Brabant.

== See also ==
- Westmalle Castle
