= Van Renesse =

Dutch noble family

Van (de) Renesse
- noble family
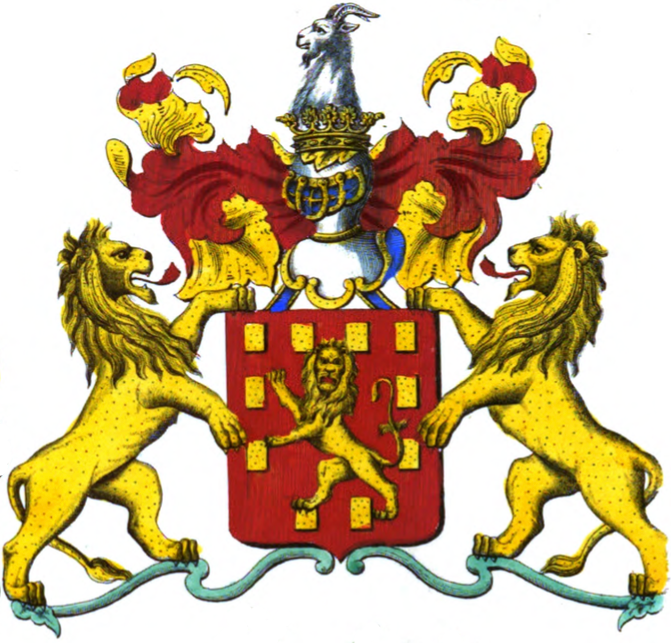
- Country: Holy Roman Empire County of Zeeland Dutch Republic Batavian Republic Kingdom of Holland First French Empire Sovereign Principality of the United Netherlands United Kingdom of the Netherlands Belgium
- Titles: Lords of Renesse; Lords of Everingen; Lords of Baarland; Lords of Rhijnauwen; Lords of Gaesbeecq; Lords of Elderen; Counts of Warfusée; Viscounts of Montignies
- Estates: Renesse Castle; Castle of Warfusée; Castle Ellewoutsdijk; Castle Hellenburg
- Cadet branches: Renesse-Warfusée(+); Renesse-Breidbach (+)

The Van Renesse family is an old Dutch noble family and cadet branch of the Van Voorne Family (in Dutch) that stems from the town of Renesse in Zeeland.

== History ==
The eldest documented ancestor of the family is Jan, Heer (feudal baron) van Renesse (1267-1295), son of Costijn van Voorne, 1st Heer van Zierikzee. The Netherlands branch ended in 1855; the Belgian branch, Van Renesse van Elderen, resides in 'S-Herenelderen Castle (1540-present).

== Heraldry ==
The Renesse coat of arms is depicted in the medieval Gelre Armorial (folio 84r).

== Members ==
- John III, Lord of Renesse
- Camille of Renesse-Breidbach (1836-1904), Belgian writer and entrepreneur.

=== Lords of Warfusée ===
- Jean VIII of Renesse, Lord of Warfusée (1505-1549);
  married to Isabelle of Nassau; daughter of Henry III of Nassau-Breda.
  - René de Renesse, 1st Count of Warfusée,
    - Alexander de Renesse, Count of warfusée, Lord of Gaesbeecq.
    - Florence-Marguerite de Renesse-Warfusée
      - Philippe François de Berghes, 1st Prince of Grimberghen
- Frederik I of Renesse, born 1470 : Lord of Oostmalle;
  Married Anne of Halmale, Lady of Elderen and Warfusée.
- Frederik II of Renesse, Lord of Elderen
- René III of Renesse, lord of Elderen; married to Catherin d'Arkel.
- Claire de Renesse: married to Philippe II of Hornes, Lord of Bassignies : Imperial Lord Chamberlain.

== Sources ==
- Nederland's Adelsboek, 2004–2005, p. 153-165.
- Oscar COOMANS DE BRACHÈNE, État présent de la noblesse belge, Annuaire 1997, Brussel, 1997.
- Jean-François HOUTART, Anciennes familles de Belgique. Bruxelles, Office généalogique et héraldique de Belgique, 2008, p. 52.
