= Orp-Jauche =

Municipality in Walloon Brabant province, Wallonia, Belgium

Orp-Jauche Oû-Djåce (Walloon): Adorp-Geten (Dutch)
- Municipality
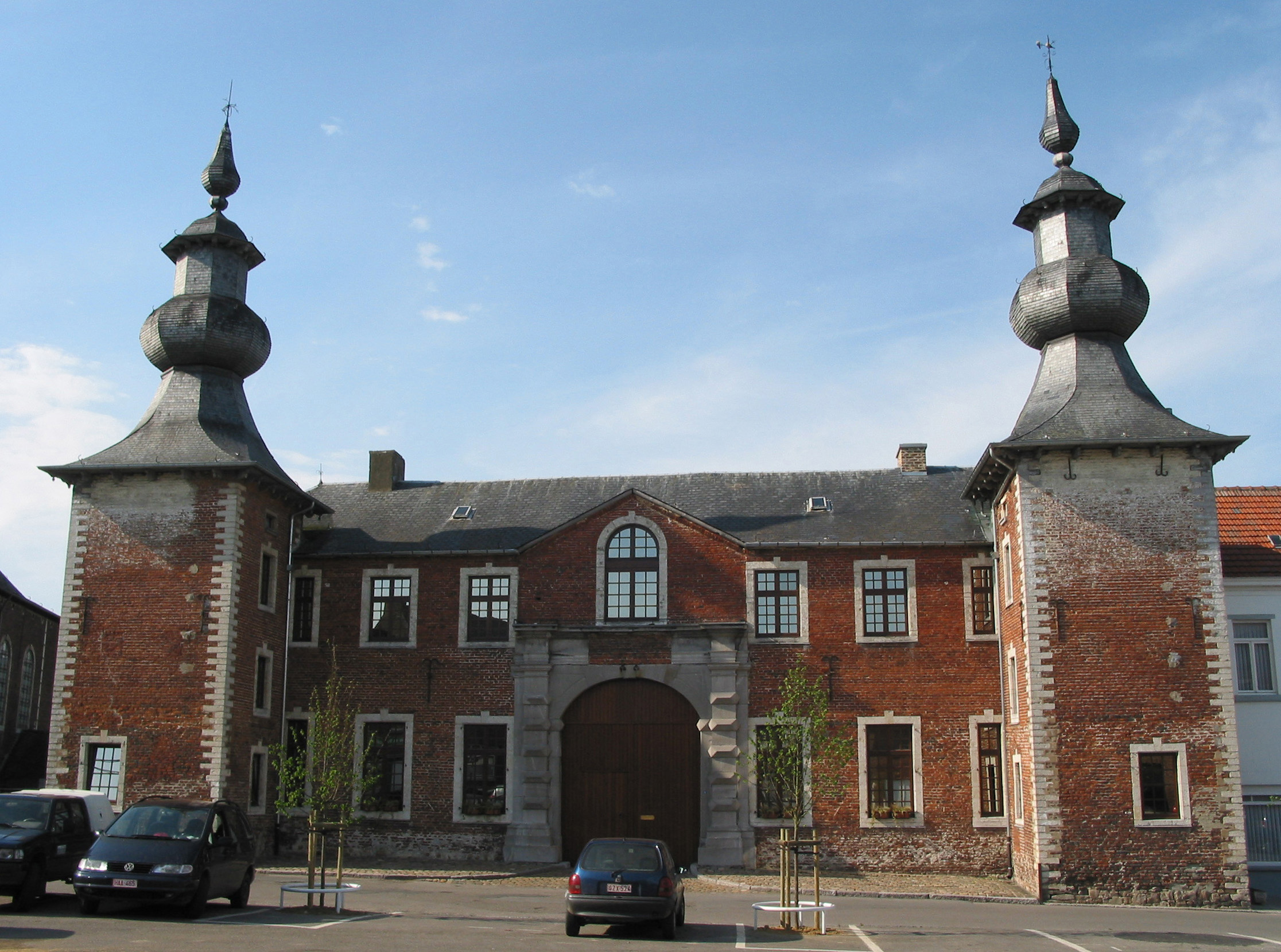
- The Baillif house in Jauche

- Flag Coat of arms

- The municipality of Orp-Jauche in Walloon Brabant
- Interactive map of Orp-Jauche
- Location in Belgium
- Coordinates: 50°41′N 04°57′E
- Country: Belgium
- Community: French Community
- Region: Wallonia
- Province: Walloon Brabant
- Arrondissement: Nivelles

Government
  - Mayor: Hugues Ghenne (UP)
  - Governing parties: PS, MR, CDH

Area
  - Total: 50.8 km^{2} (19.6 sq mi)

Population (2018-01-01)
  - Total: 8,856
  - Density: 174/km^{2} (452/sq mi)
- Postal codes: 1350
- NIS code: 25120
- Area codes: 019
- Website: www.orp-jauche.be

Orp-Jauche (French: [ɔʁp ʒoʃ]; Walloon: Oû-Djåce; Dutch: Adorp-Geten [ˈaːdɔr(ə)p ˈxeːtə(n)]) is a municipality of Wallonia located in the Belgian province of Walloon Brabant. The 2021 Belgium census shows Orp-Jauche to have a total population of 9,001, an increase of almost 9 per cent over the 8,261 at the 2011 census. The total area is 50.8 km², giving a population density for 2021 of 177 inhabitants per km².

The municipality consists of the following sub-divisions: Énines, Folx-les-Caves, Jauche, Jandrain-Jandrenouille, Marilles, Noduwez, and Orp-le-Grand.

== History ==
In 1795, the settlements of Le Grand Orp, Le Petit Orp and Maret were merged into a single municipality called Orp-le-Grand, Nodrenge was merged with Marilles, and Libertange with Noduwez. These mergers were followed in 1812 by Napoleon signing a decree uniting the villages of Jandrain and Jandrenouille to form Jandrain-Jandrenouille. In 1824 Noduwez merged with Linsmeau, only to separate in 1893. On 17 July 1970, Jauche united with Énines and Folx-les-Caves. In 1976, the municipalites of Orp-le-Grand, Marilles, Noduwez, Jauche and Jandrain-Jandrenouille were merged into a single municipality named Orp-Jauche, with its headquarters at the town hall in Orp-le-Grand. The municipal building of Jandrain-Jandrenouille continued to be used as a school and also housed the 1940 French Cavalry Corps Museum, while the one at Jauche was turned into a bistro.

== Geography ==
Orp-Jauche is in the Hesbaye region. The municipality is 85 per cent agricultural and livestock farmland. The Petite Ghette (or Gette) is the primary river running through the municipality and there is a dense network of streams prone to flooding and mudslides, requiring flood control measures. Tributaries of the Petite Gette are the streams, Ry (or Rua) Henri Fontaine, Frambais, Ry (or Rua) des Corées, Piétrain and the Bacquelaine. Rua des Corées rises in the hamlet of Hédenge in the neighbouring sub-district of Autre-Église, and after 3.9 kilometres (2.4 mi) joins the Petite Gette at the Rue de la Vallée in Jauche.

== See also ==
- John II of Cottereau, Baron of Jauche
