= Renesse =

Renesse Renisse
- Village
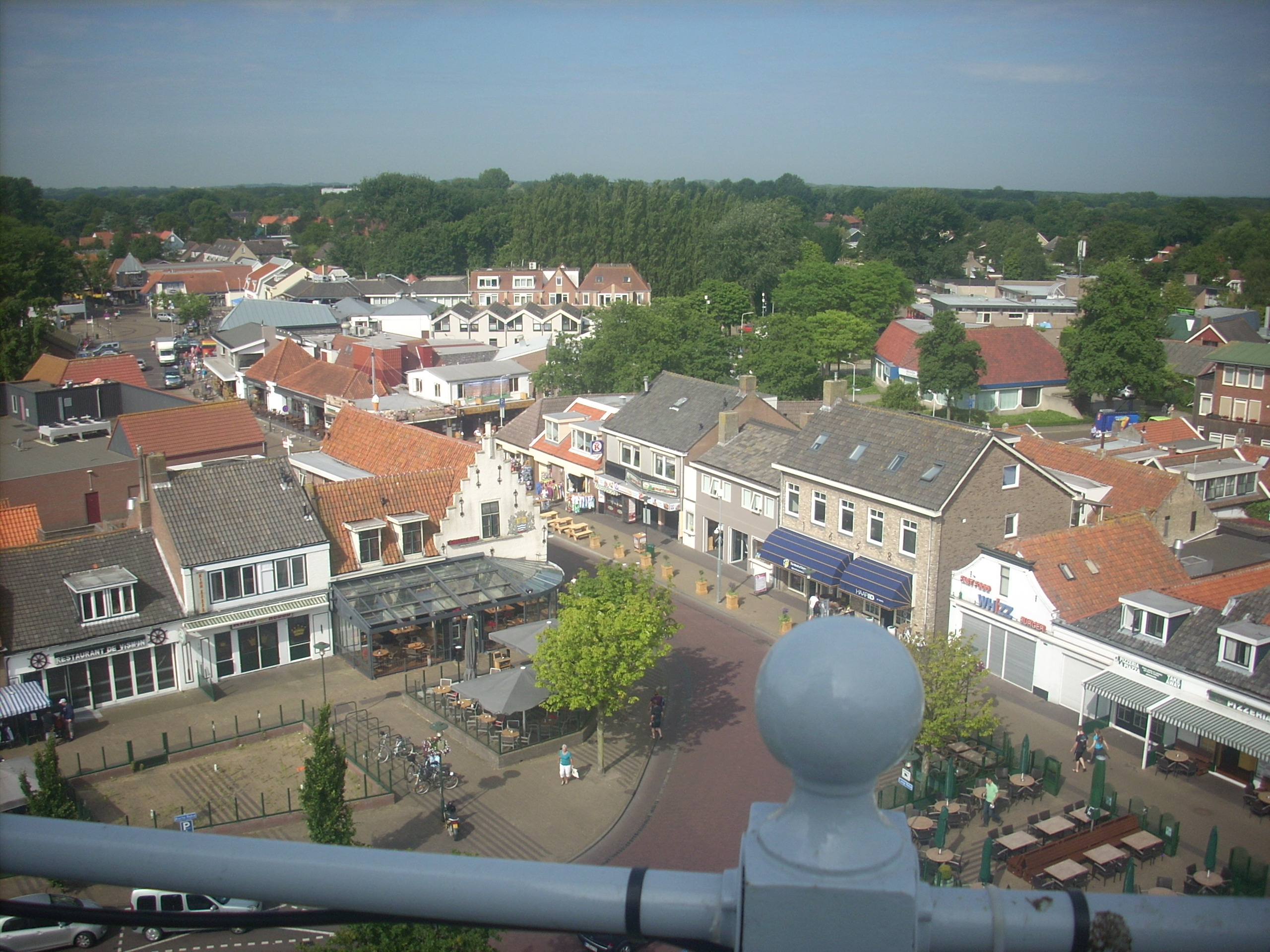

- Coat of arms

- Location in the province of Zeeland in the Netherlands Renesse (Netherlands)
- Coordinates: 51°43′56″N 3°46′23″E
- Country: Netherlands
- Province: Zeeland
- Municipality: Schouwen-Duiveland

Area
  - Total: 11.27 km^{2} (4.35 sq mi)
- Elevation: 3.9 m (13 ft)

Population (2021)
  - Total: 1,500
  - Density: 130/km^{2} (340/sq mi)
- Time zone: UTC+1 (CET)
  - Summer (DST): UTC+2 (CEST)
- Postal code: 4325
- Dialing code: 0111

Renesse (Zeeuws: Renisse) is a village in the Dutch province of Zeeland. It is a part of the municipality of Schouwen-Duiveland, and lies about 28 km west of Hellevoetsluis.

Renesse is a popular tourist resort with zero-fare bus services in the area (in summer only).

== History ==
The village was first mentioned in 1244 as Rietnesse, and is a combination of headland and reed. Renesse is a circular church village near the dunes. In 1229, Floris V, Count of Holland donated the land to Costijn van Zierikzee who built a castle near the village.

Moermond Castle was built in 1229, but destroyed in 1297. Before 1339, a new smaller castle was built, but became derelict. The gate house of around 1400 was converted in a summer residence in 1513 which became the basis of the current castle. It was severely damaged during the North Sea flood of 1953. Between 1958 and 1960, it was restored and the walls around the castle were rebuilt with three towers.

The Dutch Reformed church is a single-aisled church. The tower dates from the early 15th century and has never been completed. The choir was rebuilt in 1916 and remnants of the predecessor of around 1300 were discovered. In 1924, a school was attached to the church, but it was demolished in 1976.

At the end of 1944, ten members of the Dutch Resistance stole and destroyed the resident registration of Renesse. They were supposed to be picked up by an English patrol boat, but were arrested on the beach. The ten men were publicly hanged. The villagers and their family members were forced to witness the hanging.

Renesse was home to 470 people in 1840. It was a separate municipality until 1961, when it was merged with Westerschouwen. After World War II, Renesse develop into a tourist site with many holiday homes and hotels. In 1997, Renesse became part of the municipality of Schouwen-Duiveland.

== Van Renesse Family ==
In the 13th century the Van Renesse family built the first version of Moermond Castle.

- John III, Lord of Renesse
- René de Renesse, 1st Count of Warfusée
- The Castle of Renesse is located in the village of Oostmalle (Malle), in the Campine region of the province of Antwerp (Flanders, Belgium)

== Gallery ==
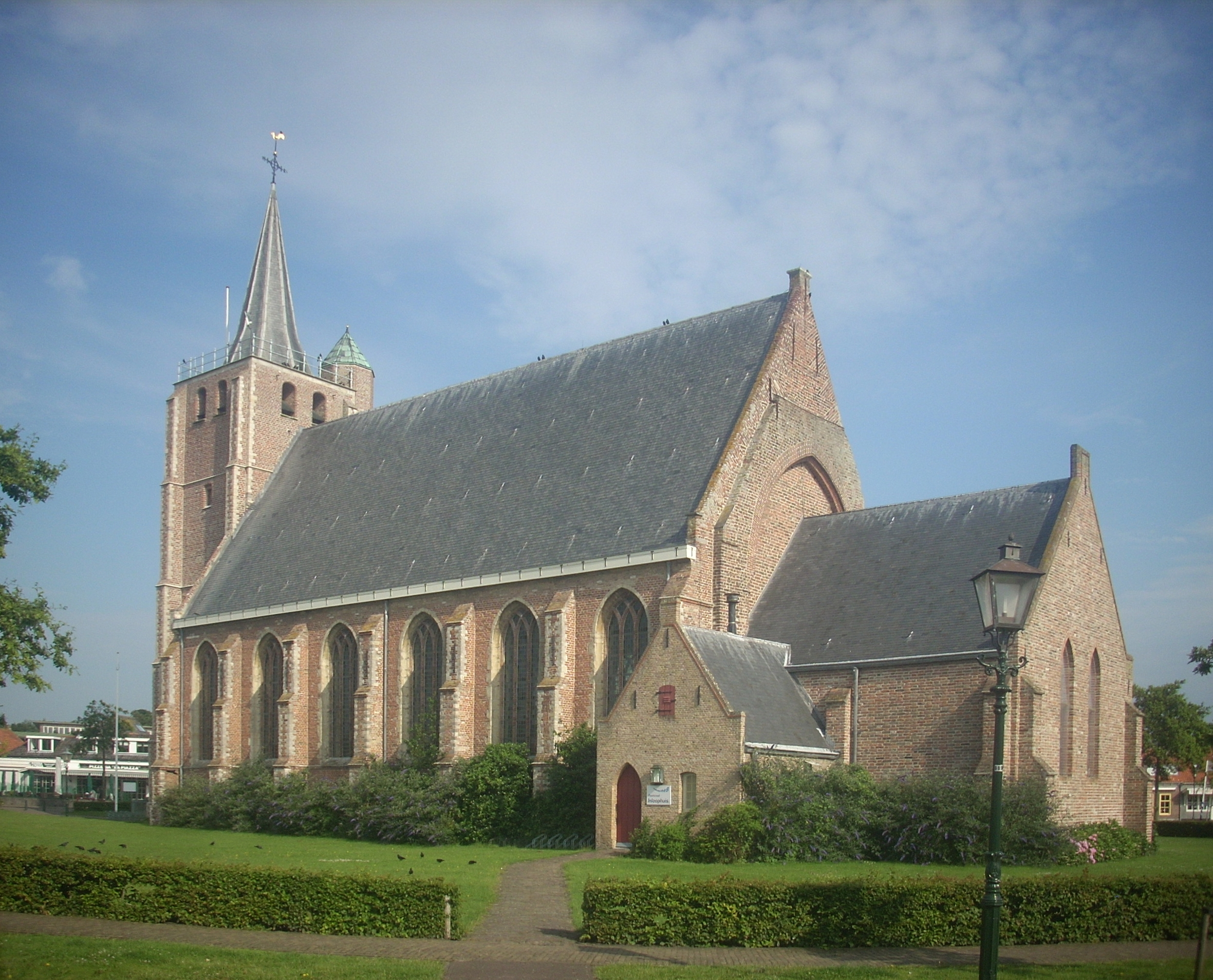
Renesse, church: Jacobuskerk

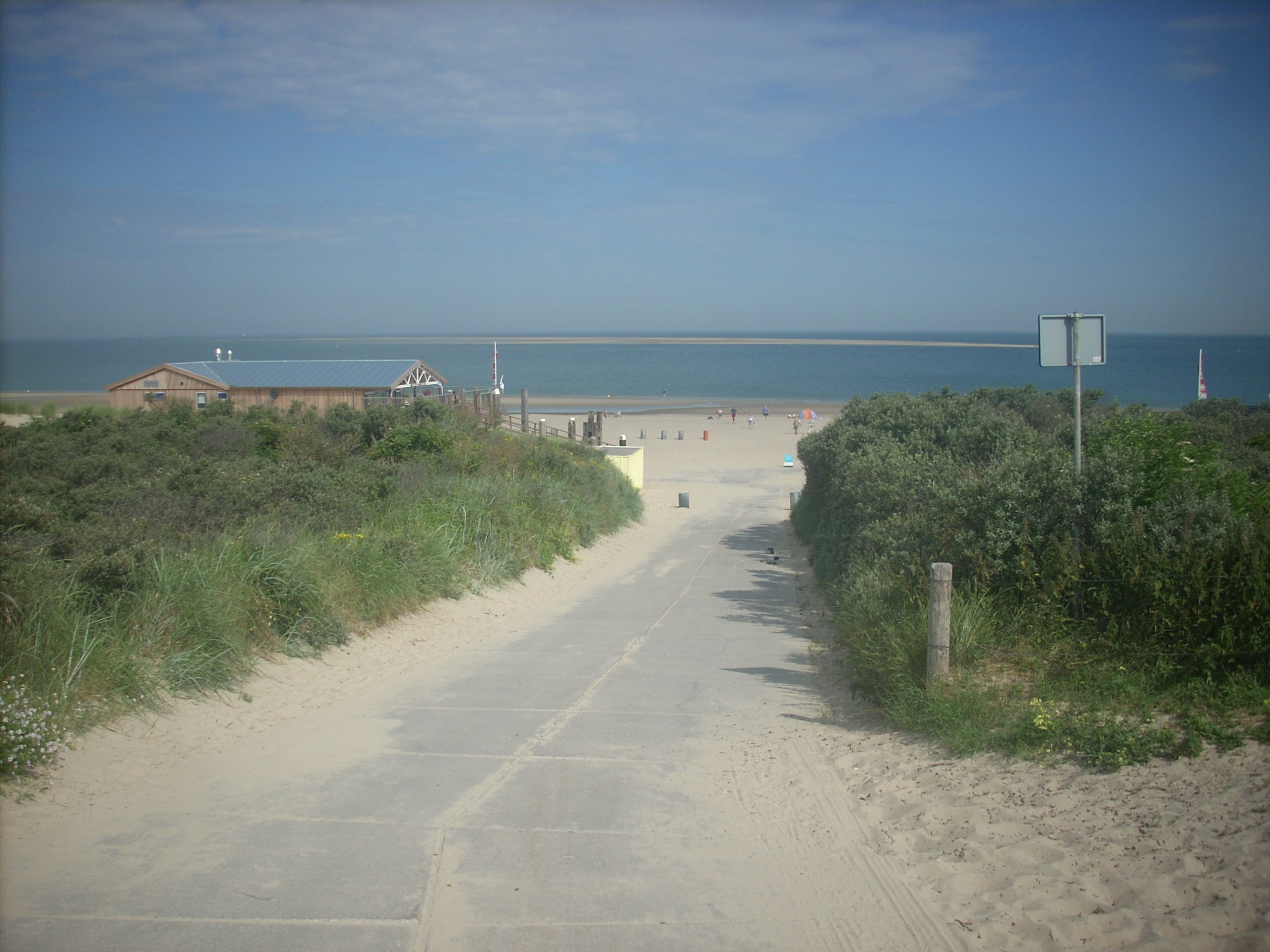
Renesse, beach

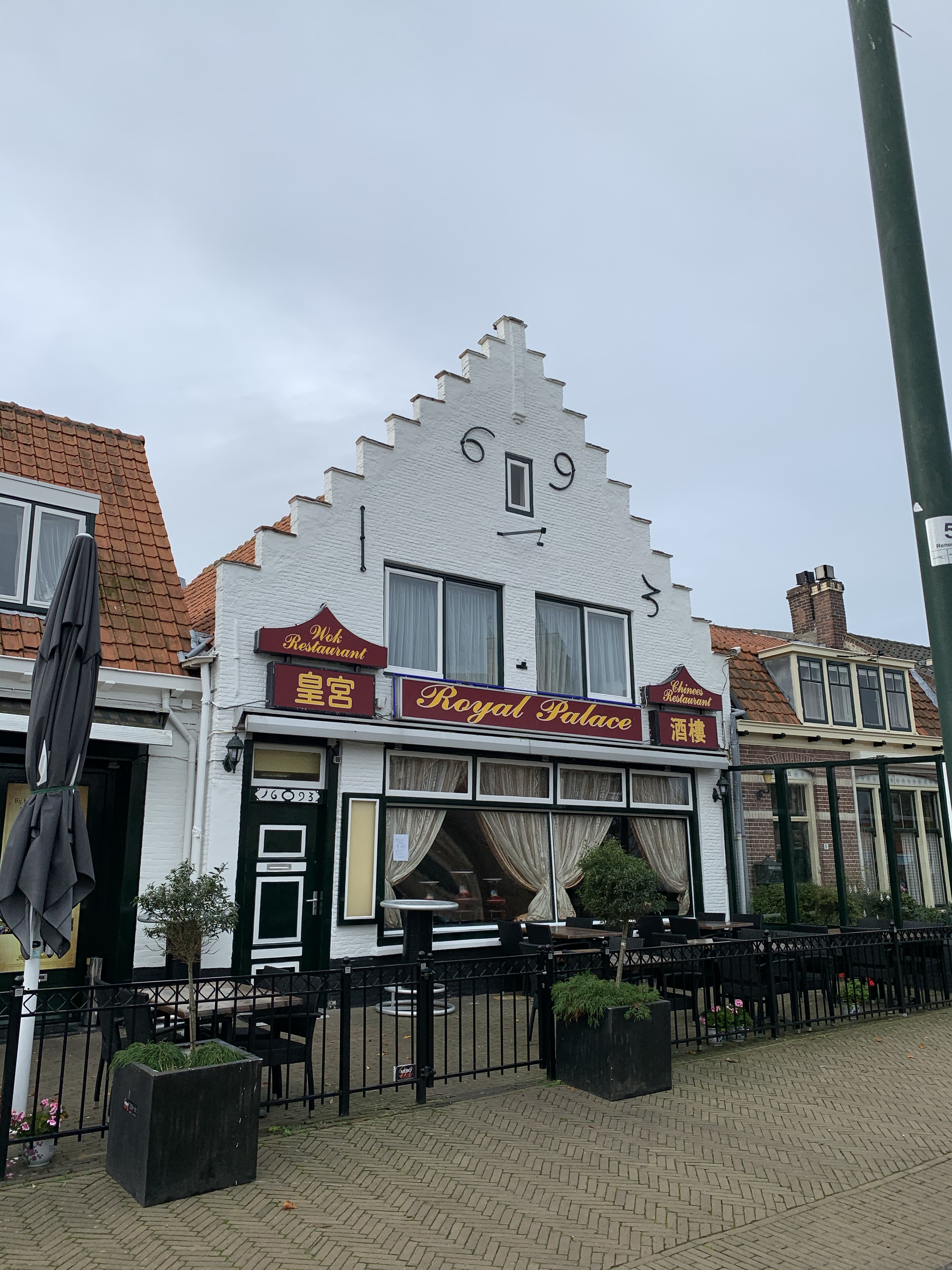
Restaurant in Renesse

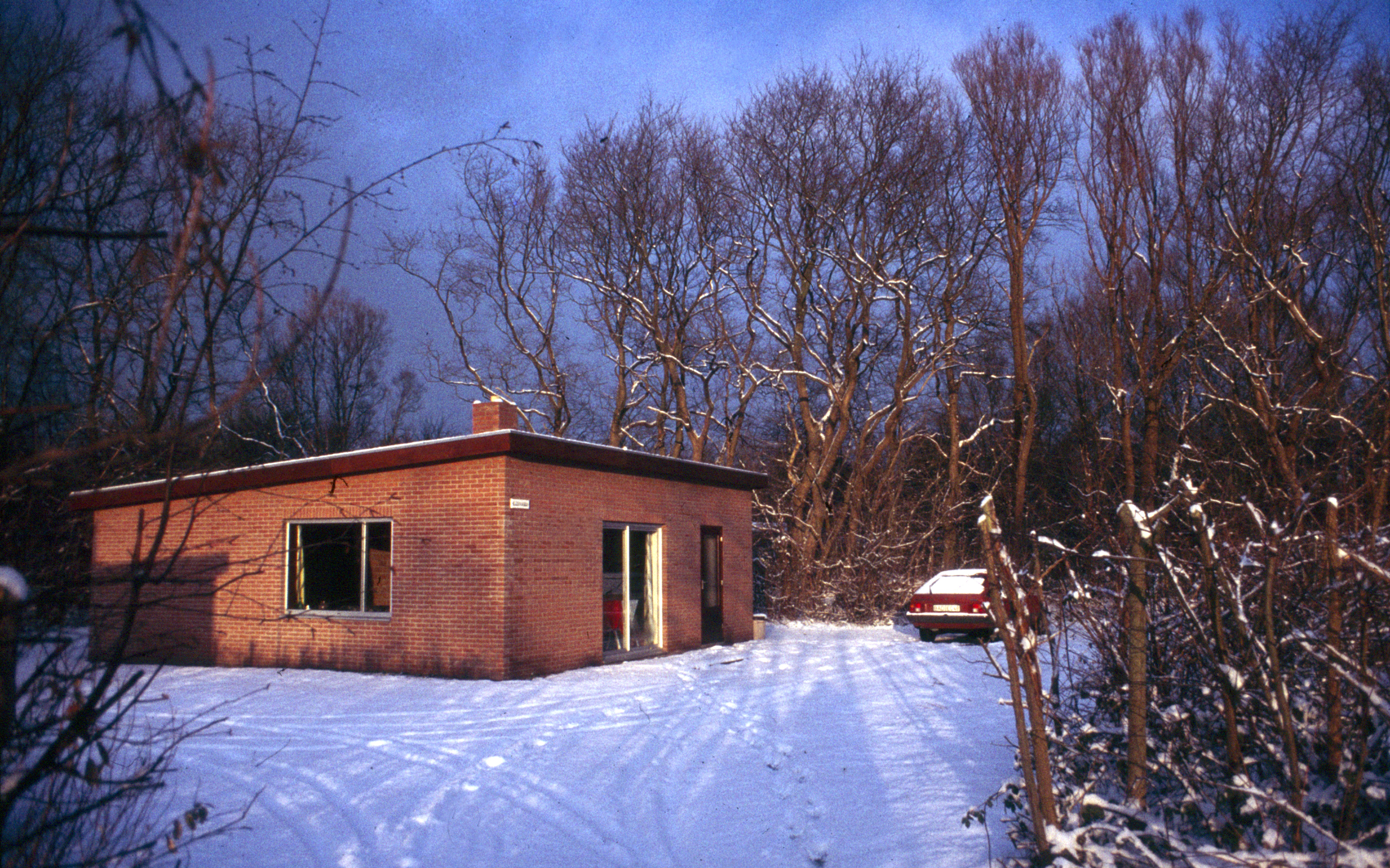
Holiday home in the snow
