= Folx-les-Caves =

Folx-les-Caves Få-les-Cåves
- Village
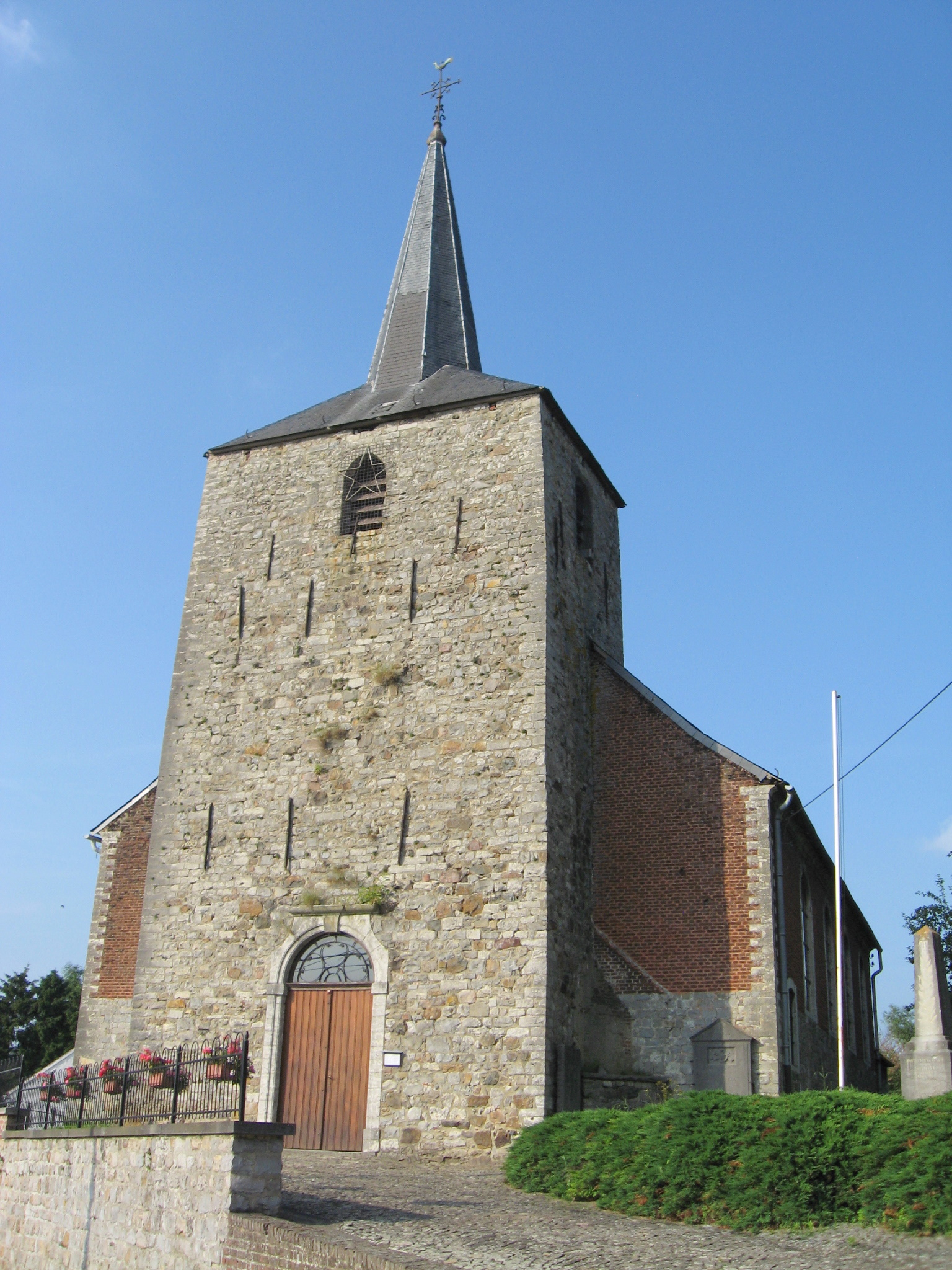
- Church of Saint-Pierre et Paul, Folx-les-Caves

- Location within Belgium
- Coordinates: 50°39′N 4°56′E
- Country: Belgium
- Municipality: Orp-Jauche
- Community: French Community
- Region: Wallonia
- Province: Walloon Brabant
- Postal code: 1350

Folx-les-Caves (French pronunciation: [folekav]); in Walloon Få-les-Cåves or Fô-les-Cåves) is a village in the Belgian municipality of Orp-Jauche located in Wallonia in the province of Walloon Brabant.

It was a municipality in its own right before the 1970 merger of the municipalities.

== Geography ==
Forming the southwestern district of Orp-Jauche, the village of Folx-les-Caves clings to the slopes of the small plateau which dominates a part of the eastern shore of the Petite Gette.

== Toponymy ==
=== Ancient forms ===
From Foul in the 13th century to Folx-les-Caves today, the village has been known as Fool, Folz, Foulx, or Fooz. The spelling of the name of the village has often varied over the centuries. To avoid confusion with other localities, a supplement has sometimes been added. This is how we find "Foul en Brabant", "Fooz de Jauche" or "Folz-les-Caves". Folx would have, according to Tarlier and Wauters, been used for the first time in 1709.

=== Etymology ===
Folx or its variant Fooz would derive from Latin fossa (quarries) or fauces (gorge, chasm or narrow passage), which would be explained by the presence in the locality of vast quarries.

== History ==
The village, which formerly belonged to the town hall of Geest-Gérompont, has an ancient past since a Frankish cemetery has been discovered here at the place called Tombois. Its existence is attested for the first time in a document dating back to the 13th century. A family of knights bearing the name of the village, the de Foul, then resided in Folx, and the Saint-Denis chapter of Liège owned here the most important domain of the locality. The Lord of Jauche, as attorney for the chapter, and the Duke of Brabant shared the exercise of justice here. So there was the "Folx du duc" and the "Folx de Jauche". This situation lasted for several centuries and finally in 1648, Guillaume de Cottereau, baron of Jauche, bought back the duke's share. Other lords had their residence in Folx-les-Caves such as, for example, the Glimes who owned in 1542 what became the Vleminckx farm, or the Rousseau, who in the 17th century were the owners of the manor of Heusbeek, or Husbeck, today the farm "de la Vallée".

In the 13th century, the abbey of Villers acquired property in the village as well as the patronage of its church.

Over the centuries, especially in the 15th and 17th centuries, Folx received the visiting Army passage and sometimes had to suffer the misdeeds and humiliations of the soldiery. During the Battle of Ramillies in 1706, the village came under fire from French artillery batteries, which inflicted considerable damage to the village.

== Economy ==
Folx-les-Caves today retains an essentially agricultural vocation. However, in the past there was some industrial activity. It developed mainly in the 9th and 10th centuries. The oldest industrial activity was undoubtedly the extraction of marl but Folx-les-Caves, well known for its mushroom production, also had on its territory a hemp battery transformed into a flour mill, sand and stone quarries, a brewery and a tannery. All of that has now disappeared.

== Sights and curiosities ==
- The man-made caves of Folx-les-Caves (Grottes de Folx-les-Caves), located beneath the town
- Folx was the main residence of Belgian painter Dominiq Fournal (since 1993)
- Folx was the residence of pianist and composer Marc Lerchs, to whom we owe in particular the first songs of Lara Fabian
