= Westenschouwen =

- Hamlet
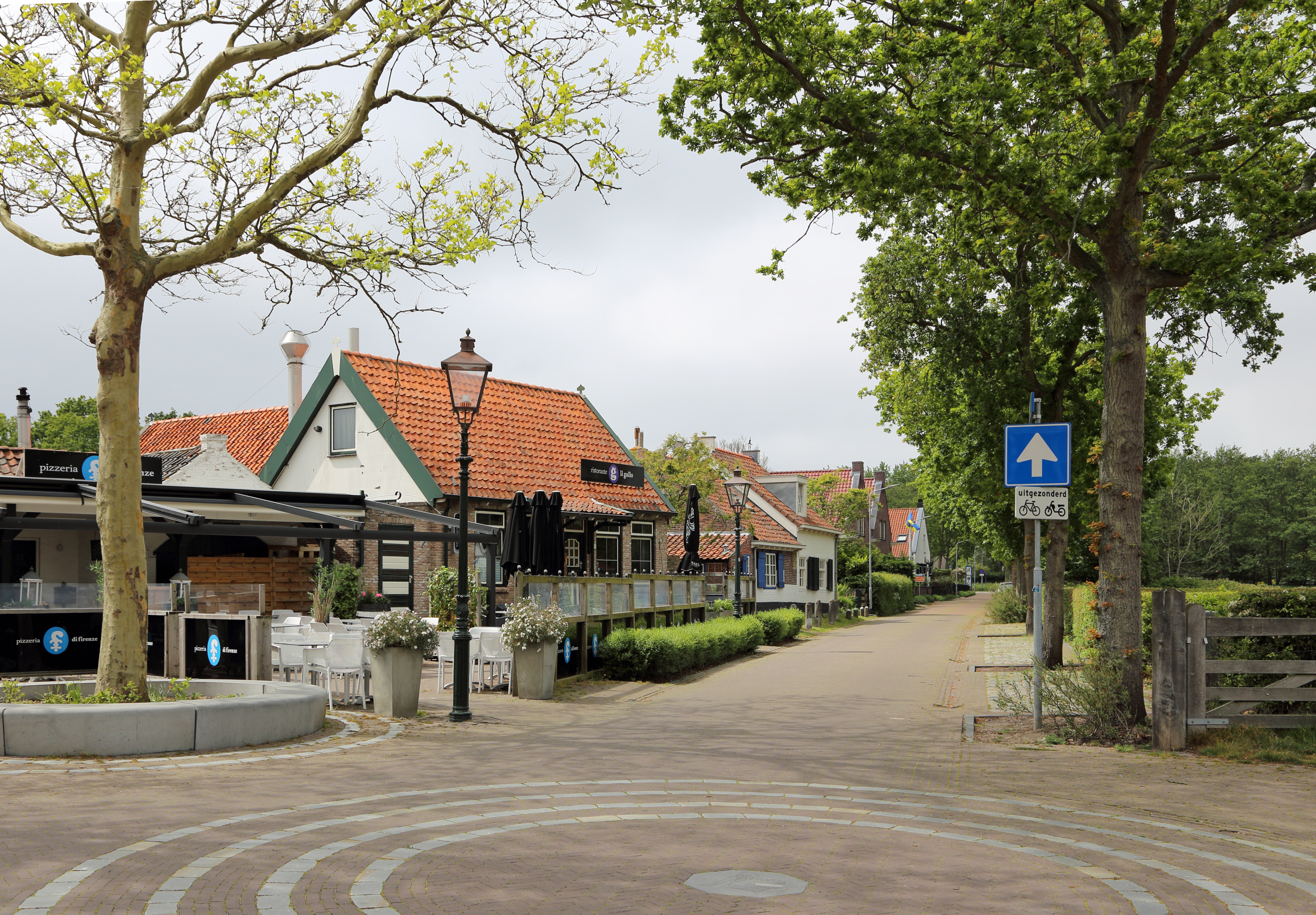
- Westenschouwen

- Coat of arms

- Location in the province of Zeeland in the Netherlands Westenschouwen (Netherlands)
- Coordinates: 51°41′N 3°43′E
- Country: Netherlands
- Province: Zeeland
- Municipality: Schouwen-Duiveland

Area
  - Total: 0.75 km^{2} (0.29 sq mi)
- Elevation: 3.0 m (9.8 ft)

Population (2021)
  - Total: 235
  - Density: 310/km^{2} (810/sq mi)
- Time zone: UTC+1 (CET)
  - Summer (DST): UTC+2 (CEST)
- Postal code: 4328
- Dialing code: 0111

Westenschouwen is a hamlet in the Dutch province of Zeeland. It is a part of the municipality of Schouwen-Duiveland, and lies about 21 km north of Middelburg.

Westenschouwen was a separate municipality until 1816, when it was merged into Burgh.

Westenschouwen was home to 88 people in 1840. The hamlet is mainly known its beach.

== Gallery ==
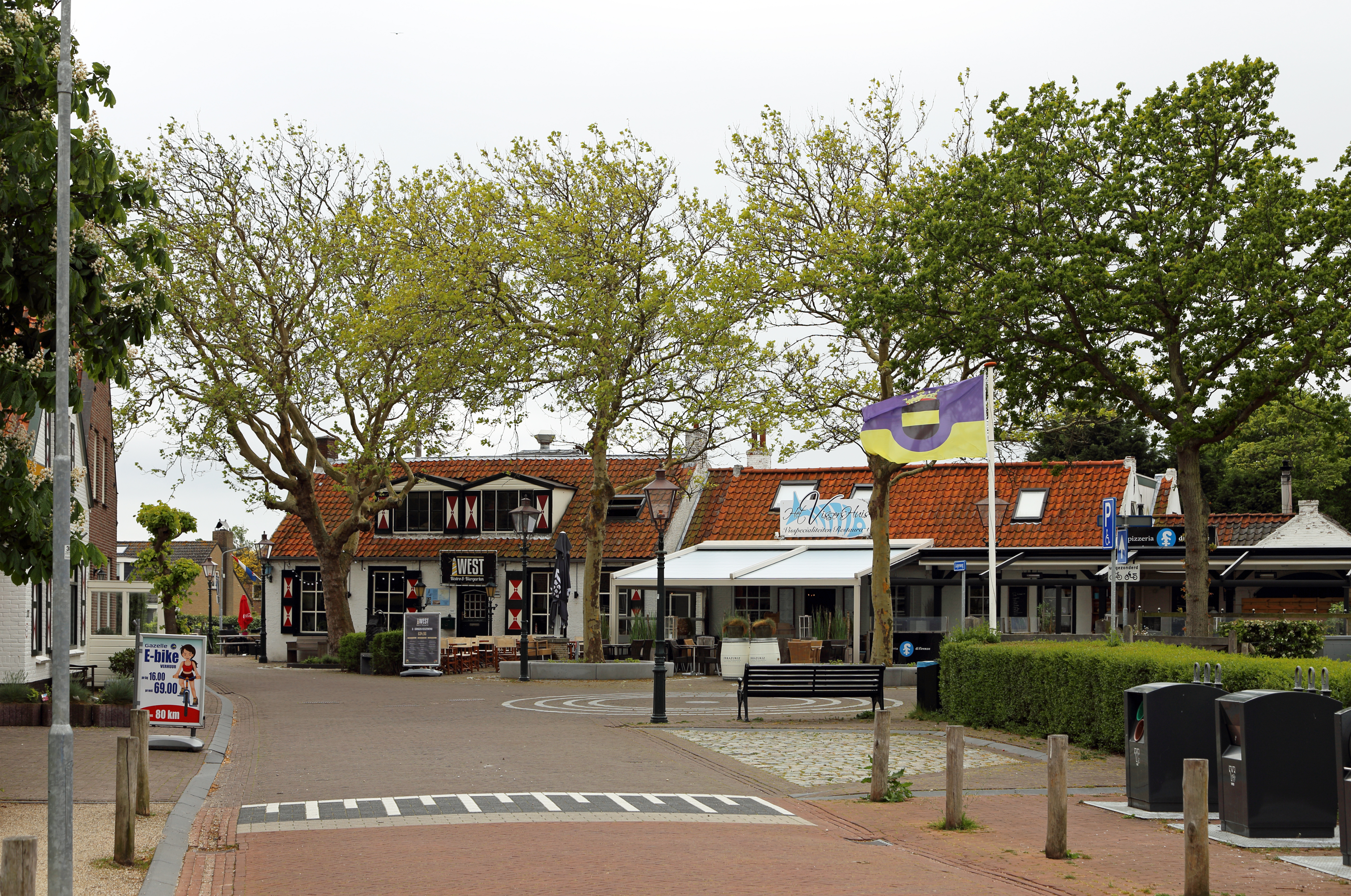
Street view

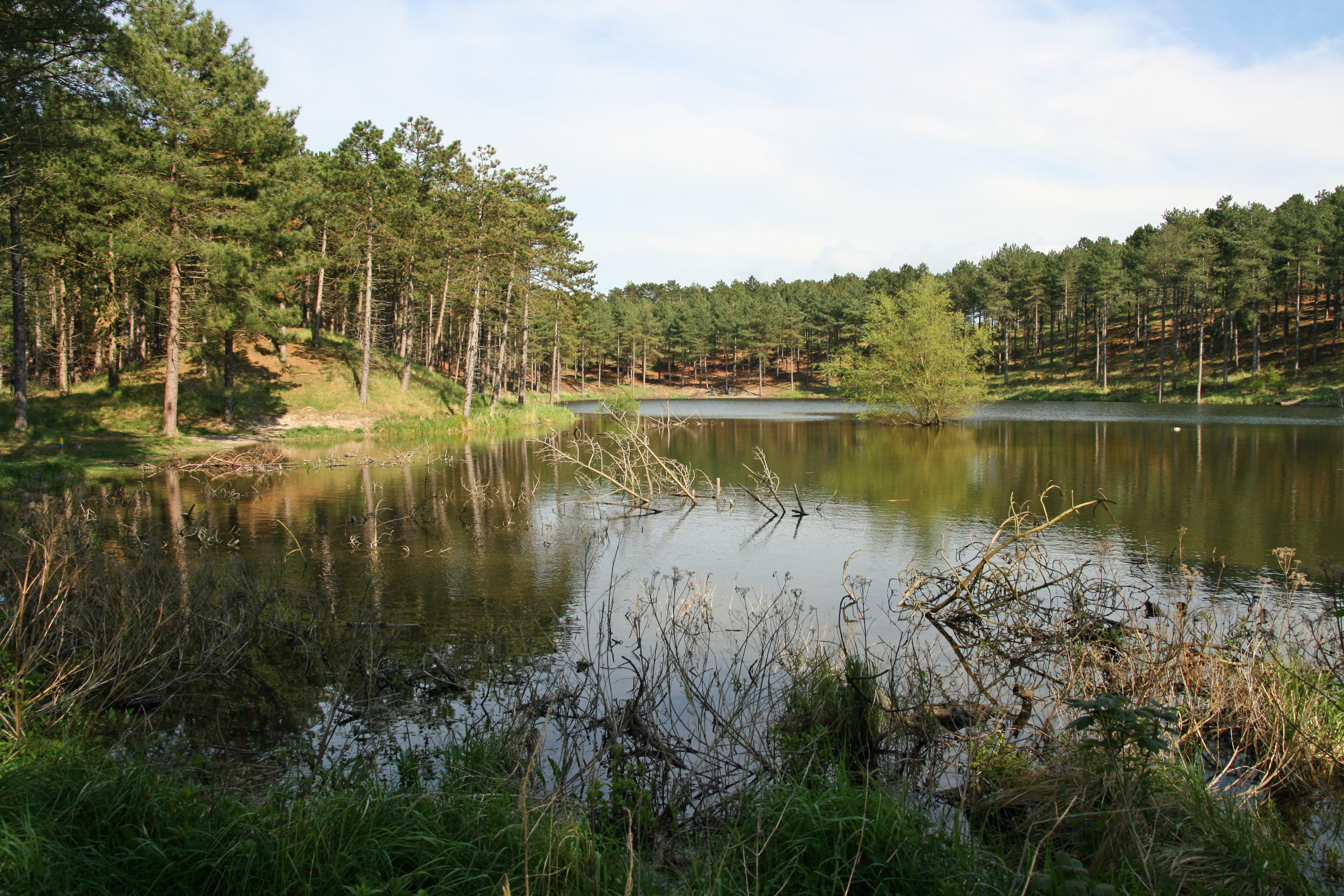
Forests near Westenschouwen
