= John III, Lord of Renesse =

Jan van Renesse (1249 – 16 August 1304) was a member of the Zeeland nobility. Together with Wolfert van Borselen he co-led a party favoring Flanders and against Holland, with considerable influence in Zeeland. With the support of Edward I of England, Jan van Renesse governed Zeeland on behalf of John I, Count of Holland (the infant son of Floris V, Count of Holland), but van Borselen took up arms against him, and he was expelled after the failure of Edward I's invasion of Flanders. John was a descendant of Henry, Count of Looz.

He fought on the Flemish side at the Battle of the Golden Spurs (1302), and supported the Flemish action against Holland and Zeeland, and managed to get as far as Utrecht, but had to flee the area after the defeat of the Flemings at Zierikzee. He drowned while crossing the River Lek.

== See also ==
- Renesse

== Sources ==
- Nobility that died in the Battle of the Golden Spurs
