= Noordwelle =

- Village
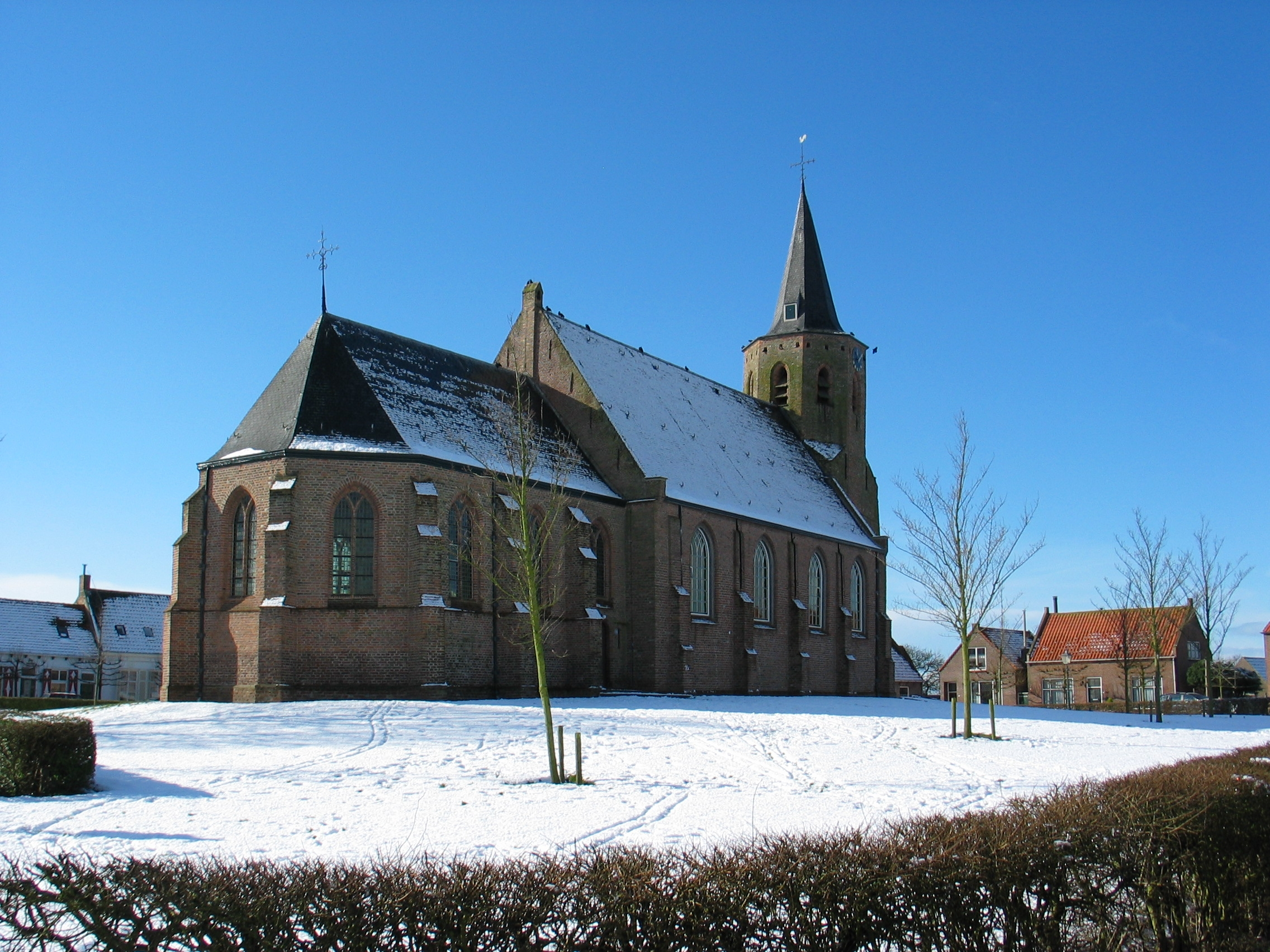
- Church of Noordwelle

- Coat of arms

- Location in the province of Zeeland in the Netherlands Noordwelle (Netherlands)
- Coordinates: 51°43′6″N 3°47′35″E
- Country: Netherlands
- Province: Zeeland
- Municipality: Schouwen-Duiveland

Area
  - Total: 7.87 km^{2} (3.04 sq mi)
- Elevation: −0.3 m (−0.98 ft)

Population (2021)
  - Total: 310
  - Density: 39/km^{2} (100/sq mi)
- Time zone: UTC+1 (CET)
  - Summer (DST): UTC+2 (CEST)
- Postal code: 4326
- Dialing code: 0111

Noordwelle is a village in the Dutch province of Zeeland. It is a part of the municipality of Schouwen-Duiveland, and lies about 5 km southwest of Scharendijke.

The village was first mentioned in 1109 as Willa, and means well. Noord (north) has been added to distinguish from the former village Zuidwelle. Noordwelle is a circular village around a church which is surrounded by moat. It developed near a 13th-century castle which was lost in a flood in the 15th or 16th century. In 1575, Noordwelle was in Spanish hands and liberated by the Dutch States Army on 14 January 1576.

The Dutch Reformed church is a single-aisled church. The tower dates from around 1450. The church was destroyed by war in 1576, and rebuilt slightly bigger in the 17th century. The choir was converted into a school in 1859. In the early 1960s, the school parts were demolished.

Noordwelle was home to 392 people in 1840. It was a separate municipality until 1961, when it was merged with Westerschouwen. In 1997, it became part of the municipality of Schouwen-Duiveland.

== Gallery ==
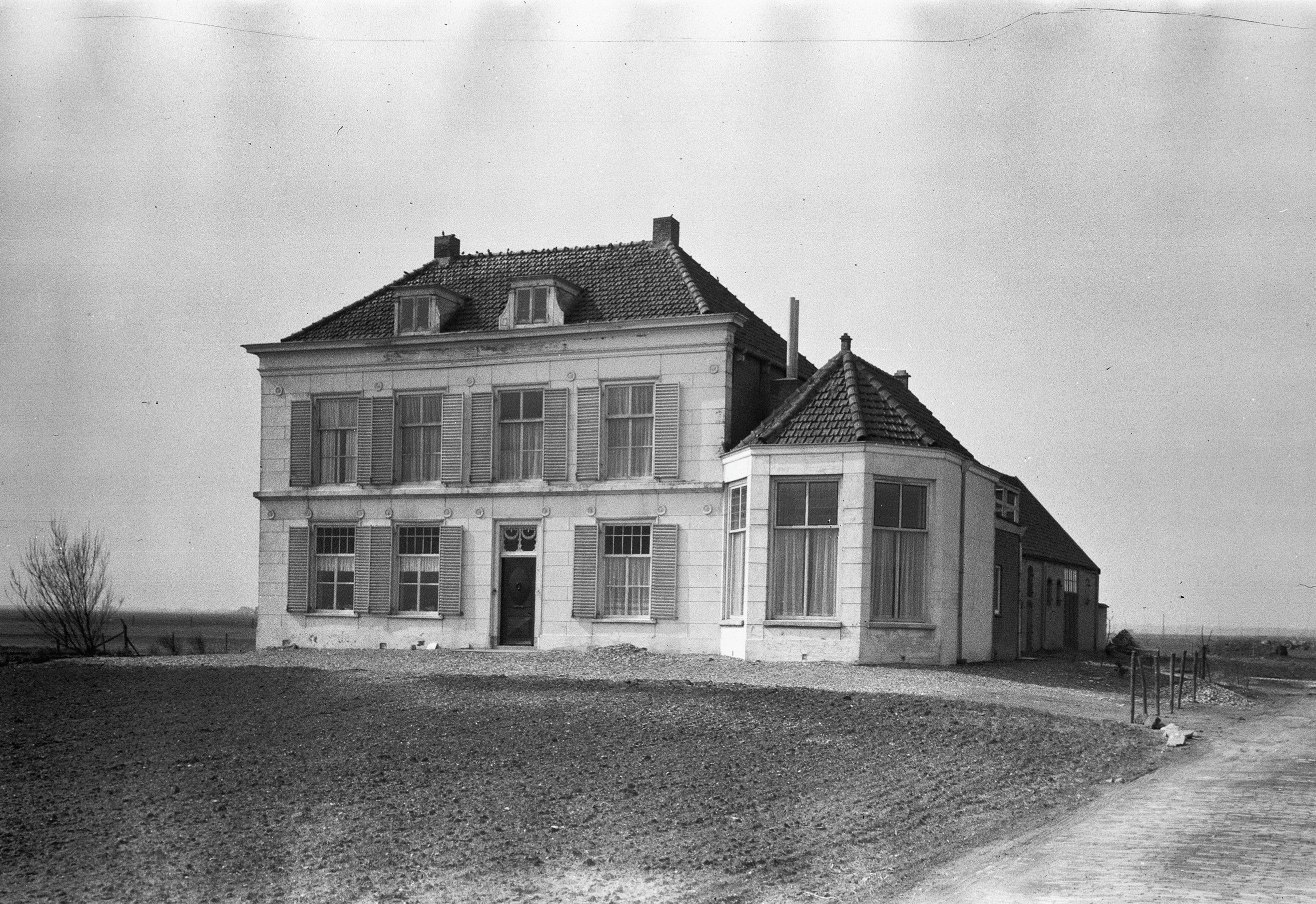
Villa in Noordwelle

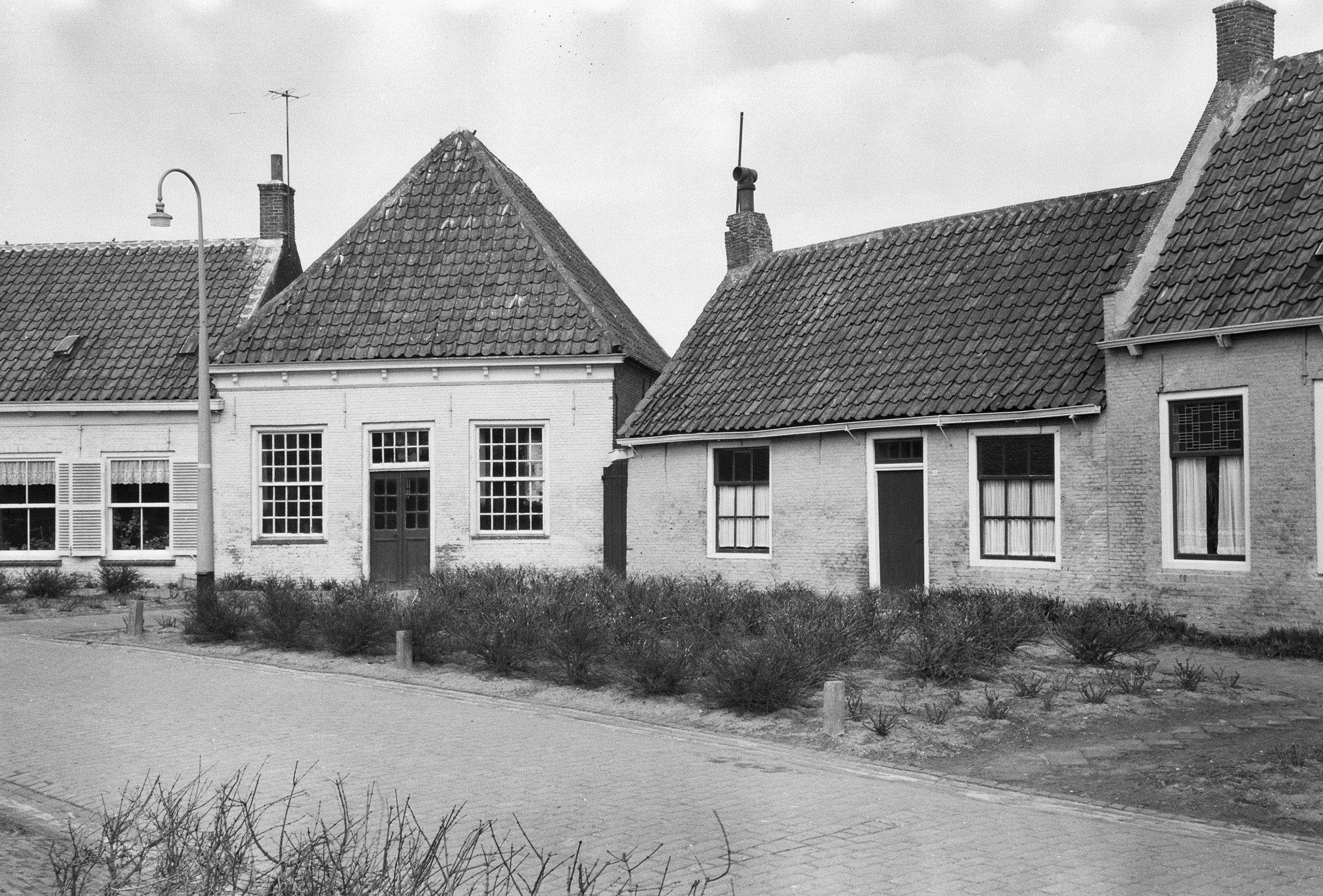
Houses in Noordwelle
