= Leonard du Bus de Gisignies =

Dutch colonial administrator and politician

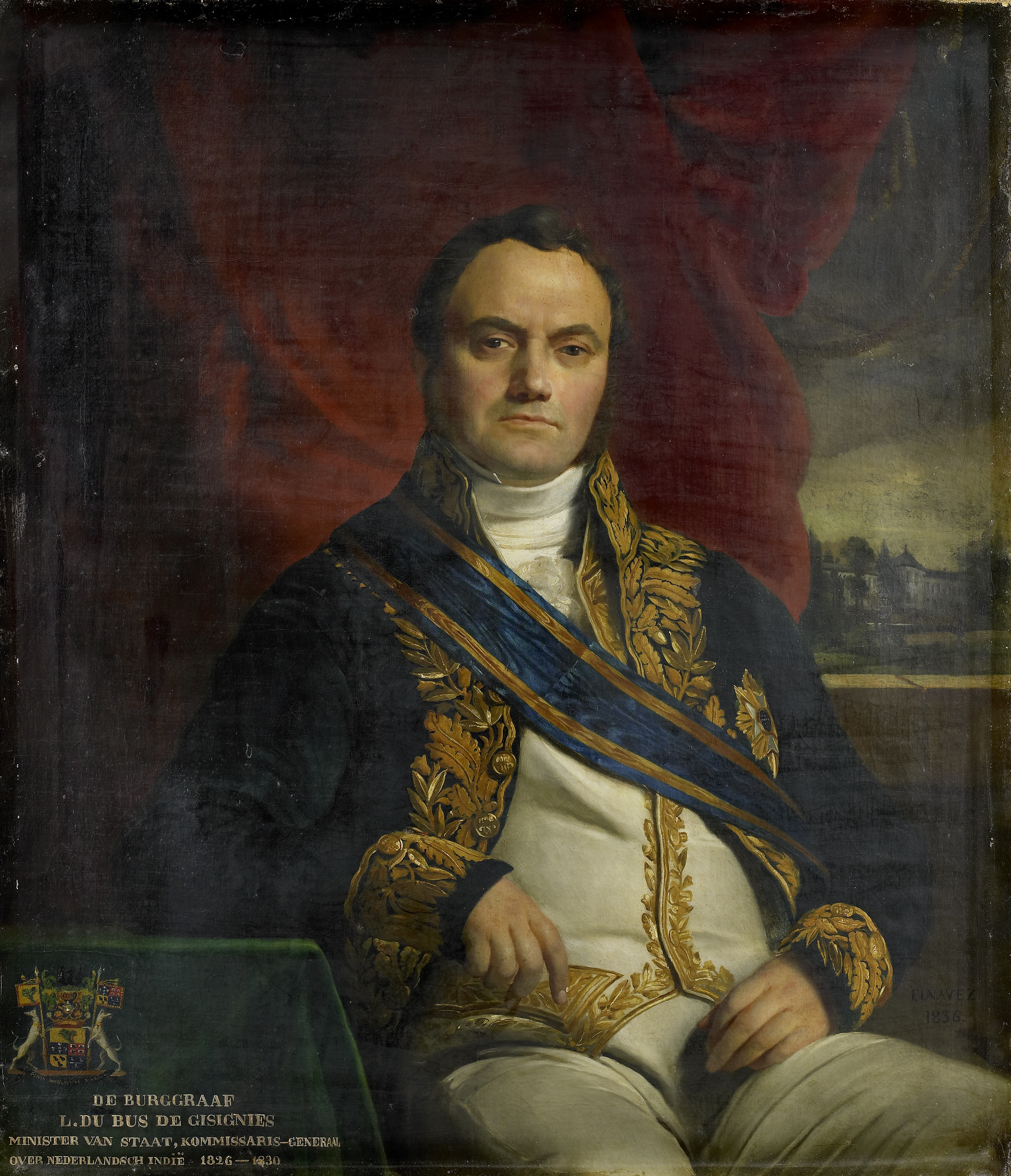
- Portrait by François-Joseph Navez, 1836

Governor-General of the Dutch East Indies
- In office 2 January 1826 – 16 January 1830
- Monarch: William I
- Lieutenant Governor: Hendrik Merkus de Kock
- Preceded by: Godert van der Capellen
- Succeeded by: Johannes van den Bosch

Speaker of the House of Representatives
- In office 19 October 1818 – 18 October 1819
- Preceded by: Jan Pieter van Wickenwoort Crommelin
- Succeeded by: Arnold Hendrik van Markel Bouwer

Personal details
- Born: Leonard Pierre Joseph Dubus; 28 February 1780 Mouscron, Austrian Netherlands
- Died: 31 May 1849 (aged 69) Oostmalle, Belgium
- Spouses: Marie-Catherine de Deurwaerder (m. 1802; died 1836) Marie-Antoinette van der Gracht de Fretin (m. 1839)
- Children: Clémentine Cathérine François du Bus de Gisignies (daughter); Gustave Bernard Joseph du Bus de Gisignies (son); Bernard Aimé Léonard du Bus de Gisignies (son); Albéric du Bus de Gisignies (son); Chrétien Henri Honoré Léonard du Bus de Gisignies (son); Constantin Léonard Anne Francois Marie Joseph du Bus de Gisignies (son)
- Parents: Pierre Ignace du Bus (father); Marie Debrandrengluin (mother)

Military service
- Allegiance: Kingdom of France
- Branch/service: French Royal Army
- Years of service: 1802–1815

Leonard Pierre Joseph, Viscount du Bus de Gisignies (28 February 1780 – 31 May 1849) was a soldier and politician in the United Kingdom of the Netherlands.

== Early life ==
He was born in Dottignies, Austrian Netherlands on 28 February 1780. He was born as Leonard Pierre Joseph Dubus, but on 14 June 1822, de Gisignies was added to his name.

He probably started to study law at Douai, but did not finish his education, because universities closed for some time during the French Revolution.

== Career ==
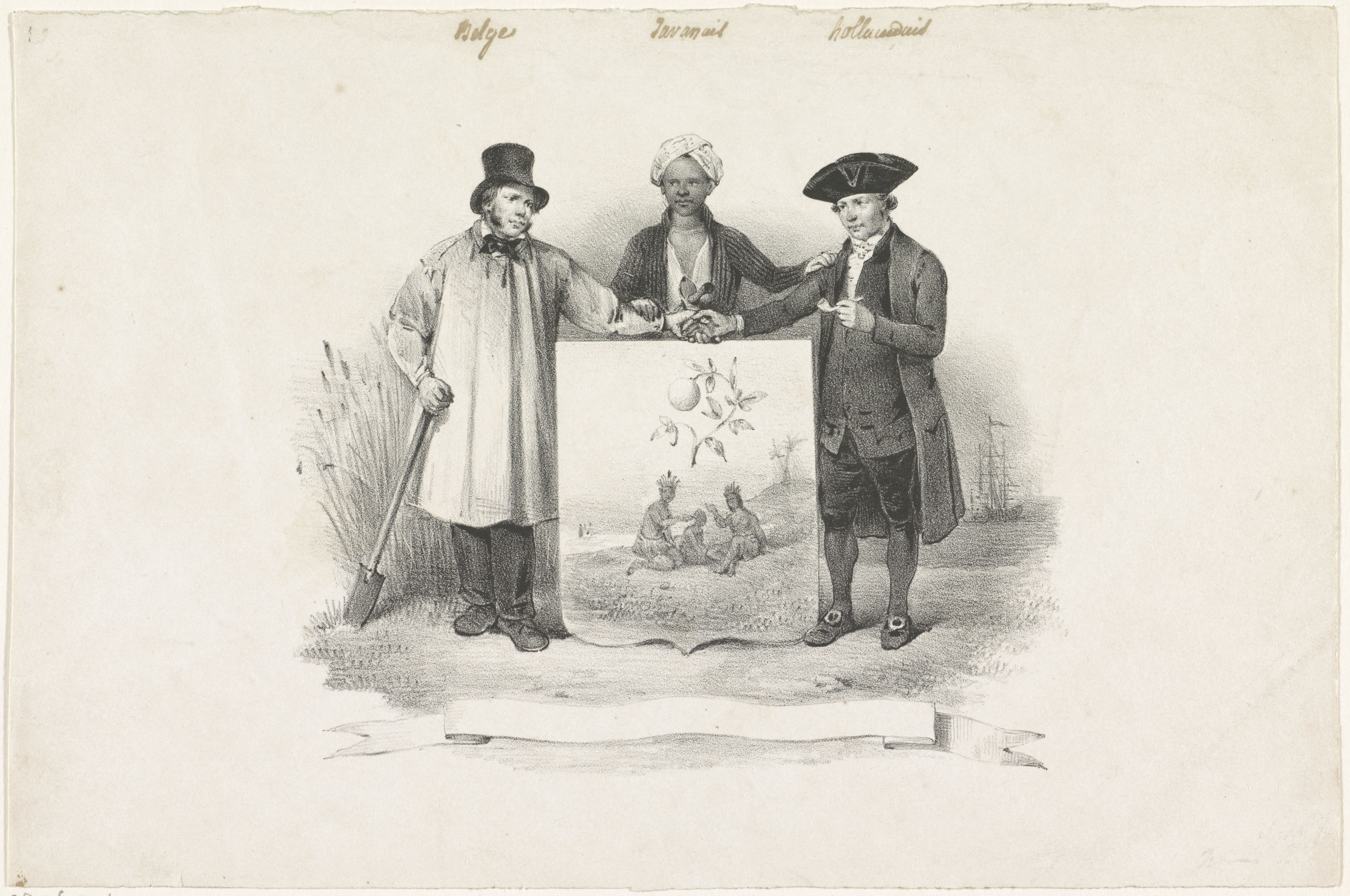
Allegorical Coat of Arms on the appointment of Du Bus de Gisignies as Commissioner. Showing a Belgian and a Dutchman shake hands, while a Javanese stands behind the shield and his hands on the arms of both men. (3 February 1826)

He served in the French Royal Army from 1802 until 1815. On 21 September 1815, in the United Kingdom of the Netherlands, he became a member of the House of Representatives of the States-General of the Netherlands for the province of West Flanders and on 20 September 1816, he was raised to Dutch nobility and was knighted on 24 November 1816, he later became its President during the meeting year from 1818 to 1819.

On 22 May 1819 he became a Viscount. He was made a commander on 20 July 1823 in the order of the Dutch Lion, and would later receive on 6 July 1830 the cross in the same order.

Afterwards he had several administrative functions, first of all as Governor of the province of Antwerp on 3 April 1820 - March 1823, and from 25 March 1823 up to 9 May 1828 of the province of South Brabant (Dutch: Zuid-Brabant).

From 4 February 1826 up to 16 January 1830 he was Governor-General of the Dutch East Indies (Dutch: Commissaris-Generaal) of the Dutch East Indies, for which he received an annual wages of 200,000 Guilders, with the condition that he also retained his function of governor of South Brabant. On 9 May 1828 he was appointed as Minister of State, but after the Belgian Revolution he was removed from this office on 18 October 1830. On 6 October 1830, he bought Renesse Castle in Oostmalle from Count Clement-Wenceslas de Renesse-Breidbach and renovated the castle in Empire style.

== Personal life ==
On 20 July 1802, he married his first wife, Marie-Catherine de Deurwaerder, who died on 23 June 1836. He had 1 daughter and 5 sons from his first marriage:

- Clémentine Cathérine François du Bus de Gisignies (Bruges, 7 August 1803 – Kortrijk, 18 October 1817),
- Knight Gustave Bernard Joseph du Bus de Gisignies (Bruges, 5 May 1807 – Brussels, 23 September 1831),
- Bernard Aimé Léonard du Bus de Gisignies (Saint-Josse-ten-Noode, 21 June 1808 – Brussels, 6 July 1874),
- Viscount Albéric du Bus de Gisignies (Tournai, 30 May 1810 – Brussels, 26 July 1874),
- Baron Chrétien Henri Honoré Léonard du Bus de Gisignies (Kortrijk, 17 September 1819 – Brussels, 9 June 1835),
- Viscount Constantin Léonard Anne Francois Marie Joseph du Bus de Gisignies (Brussels, 11 October 1823 – Saint-Josse-ten-Noode, 16 November 1850).

He married his second wife Marie-Antoinette van der Gracht de Fretin on 20 November 1839.

== Death ==
He died in Oostmalle, Belgium on 31 May 1849.

== Sources ==
- Bart De Prins, Léonard Du Bus de Gisignies (1780–1849), Belgian Commissioner-general in the Dutch East Indies: A Reassessment, Itnerario, 2000.
- Bart de Prins, Voor Keizer en Koning, Leonard du Bus de Gisignies 1780 - 1849, Commissaris-Generaal van Nederlands-Indië, ISBN 90-5018-577-0
- L.P.J. burggraaf du Bus de Gisignies (in Dutch)

Political offices
Preceded by Godert van der Capellen	Governor-General of the Dutch East Indies; 1826–1830; Served alongside: Hendrik Merkus de Kock	Succeeded by Johannes van den Bosch
Preceded by Jan Pieter van Wickenwoort Crommelin	Speaker of the House of Representatives; 1818–1819	Succeeded by Arnold Hendrik van Markel Bouwer
