= List of protected heritage sites in Genk =

This table shows an overview of the protected heritage sites in the Flemish town Genk. This list is part of Belgium's national heritage.

Object	Status^{?}	Year/architect	Town/section	Address	Coordinates	Number^{?}	Image
Chapel of Our Lady of d'Ierd- ^{(nl)} ^{(fr)}			Genk	D'Ierdstraat	50.95970°N 5.49516°E	21604 Info	
dwelling house ^{(nl)} ^{(fr)}			Genk	Driehoevenstraat 4-4A-4B	50.99859°N 5.49385°E	21605 Info	
Eclectic style mansion ^{(nl)} ^{(fr)}			Genk	Grotestraat 10	50.96390°N 5.49753°E	21606 Info	
Saint Anthony's Chapel ^{(nl)} ^{(fr)}			Genk	Hasseltweg	50.95957°N 5.44838°E	21608 Info	
Dumont memorial and former church plan ^{(nl)} ^{(fr)}			Genk	Schepen Noël Bijnensplein		21610 Info	
St. Martin Parish ^{(nl)} ^{(fr)}			Genk	Schepen Noël Bijnensplein	50.96388°N 5.50086°E	21611 Info	
elongated farm ^{(nl)} ^{(fr)}			Genk	Kiezelstraat 3	50.96856°N 5.52607°E	21612 Info	
elongated farm ^{(nl)} ^{(fr)}			Genk	Smeilstraat 15	50.94179°N 5.52850°E	21615 Info	
Cafe, former watermill ^{(nl)} ^{(fr)}			Genk	Molenstraat 81	50.96452°N 5.50637°E	21616 Info	
Our Lady Chapel ^{(nl)} ^{(fr)}			Genk	Neerzijstraat	50.96902°N 5.53127°E	21617 Info	
Parish of Our Lady of Rosary-the- ^{(nl)} ^{(fr)}			Genk	Rozenkranslaan	50.96134°N 5.48598°E	21618 Info	
water mill ^{(nl)} ^{(fr)}	Yes		Genk	Slagmolenweg 76	50.95993°N 5.47282°E	21619 Info	
Neoclassical former section house ^{(nl)} ^{(fr)}			Genk	Hoogstraat 2-4	50.96344°N 5.49890°E	21620 Info	
Property of 1844 ^{(nl)} ^{(fr)}			Genk	Stationsstraat 13	50.96403°N 5.49923°E	21621 Info	
elongated farm ^{(nl)} ^{(fr)}		GESLOOPT, nu nieuwbouwwoning	Genk	Turfstraat 97	50.96500°N 5.43534°E	21623 Info	
elongated farm ^{(nl)} ^{(fr)}			Genk	Zonhoverweg 125	50.97695°N 5.44034°E	21625 Info	
Castle Bokrijk ^{(nl)} ^{(fr)}	Yes		Genk	Bokrijklaan 6	50.96853°N 5.40871°E	21626 Info	
elongated farm ^{(nl)} ^{(fr)}			Genk	Langerloweg 85	50.94786°N 5.49852°E	21627 Info	
Shafts and shaft towers ^{(nl)}	Yes		Genk	André Dumontlaan	50.99533°N 5.53921°E	200576 Info	
reception buildings ^{(nl)}	Yes		Genk	André Dumontlaan	50.99518°N 5.53778°E	200577 Info	
Pick-up buildings ^{(nl)}	Yes		Genk	André Dumontlaan	50.99478°N 5.53782°E	200578 Info	
fan buildings ^{(nl)}	Yes		Genk	André Dumontlaan	50.99528°N 5.53696°E	200579 Info	
main building ^{(nl)}	Yes		Genk	André Dumontlaan	50.99462°N 5.53670°E	200585 Info	
Concrete pedestrian footbridge ^{(nl)} ^{(fr)}	Yes		Genk	André Dumontlaan	50.99517°N 5.53670°E	200586 Info	More images
Christ the King Parish ^{(nl)} ^{(fr)}	Yes		Genk	Duinenlaan	51.00020°N 5.53001°E	200588 Info	
St. Albertus Parish ^{(nl)} ^{(fr)}	Yes		Genk	Cockerillplaats	51.00938°N 5.51356°E	200589 Info	More images
Sacred Heart Parish ^{(nl)} ^{(fr)}			Genk	Evence Coppéeplaats	50.97245°N 5.48257°E	200590 Info	
Shafts and shaft towers ^{(nl)}	Yes		Genk	Evence Coppéelaan	50.98216°N 5.48996°E	200592 Info	
Pick-up buildings ^{(nl)}	Yes		Genk	Evence Coppéelaan	50.98260°N 5.49116°E	200593 Info	
Compressors and fans building ^{(nl)} ^{(fr)}	Yes		Genk	Evence Coppéelaan	50.98258°N 5.49056°E	200594 Info	
reception buildings ^{(nl)} ^{(fr)}			Genk	Evence Coppéelaan	50.98202°N 5.48995°E	200595 Info	
Boiler house and power plant ^{(nl)} ^{(fr)}	Yes		Genk	Evence Coppéelaan	50.98279°N 5.48837°E	200597 Info	
Central Warehouse ^{(nl)} ^{(fr)}	Yes		Genk	Evence Coppéelaan	50.98339°N 5.48744°E	200600 Info	
Stables (former) ^{(nl)} ^{(fr)}	Yes		Genk	Evence Coppéelaan	50.98312°N 5.48617°E	200601 Info	
Main Complex of the mine Winterslag ^{(nl)} ^{(fr)}	Yes		Genk	Evence Coppéelaan 91		201202 Info	
director's property ^{(nl)}	Yes		Genk	Marcel Habetslaan 58	51.01258°N 5.49274°E	201207 Info	
sports ^{(nl)} ^{(fr)}	Yes		Genk	Emiel Van Dorenlaan 144		205812 Info	
Notre Dame High School, former Expo '58 pavilion ^{(nl)} ^{(fr)}	Yes		Genk	Collegelaan 30		208913 Info	

== See also ==
- List of onroerend erfgoed in Limburg (Belgium)
- Genk
