= List of protected heritage sites in Huy =

This table shows an overview of the protected heritage sites in the Walloon town Huy. This list is part of Belgium's national heritage.

Object	Year/architect	Town/section	Address	Coordinates	Number^{?}	Image
Abbey of Alne (old pilgrim shelter) ^{(nl)} ^{(fr)}		Huy	rue du Vieux Pont n° 2	50.519855°N 5.233289°E	61031-CLT-0006-01 Info	Onderdak van de abdij van Alne
Agricultural Schoolhouse called "le ponton" ^{(nl)} ^{(fr)}		Huy	rue St-Victor, n°5	50.519078°N 5.226318°E	61031-CLT-0008-01 Info	
Old Franciscan monastery ^{(nl)} ^{(fr)}		Huy	Rue Vankeerberghen n° 20	50.518746°N 5.243391°E	61031-CLT-0009-01 Info	Oud klooster van de Minderbroeders More images
house "du Gouverneur" ^{(nl)} ^{(fr)}		Huy	rue Vankeerberghen n° 14	50.518881°N 5.242741°E	61031-CLT-0010-01 Info	Huis genaamd "du Gouverneur" More images
Collegiate Church of Notre-Dame ^{(nl)} ^{(fr)}		Huy		50.518824°N 5.238167°E	61031-CLT-0011-01 Info	Collegiale kerk Notre-Dame More images
Church St-Mort ^{(nl)} ^{(fr)}		Huy		50.513422°N 5.239825°E	61031-CLT-0012-01 Info	Kerk St-Mort More images
Old church of Statte and its walls along the local Stations of the Cross, the old cemetery, the church and the road "Chemin de Messe" ^{(nl)} ^{(fr)}		Huy		50.530832°N 5.220538°E	61031-CLT-0013-01 Info	Oude kerk van Statte en muren langs de chemin de Messe, en het ensemble van de voormalige calvarie van Statte, de oude begraafplaats, de kerk en de weg chemin de Messe
Thier de Statte Stations of the Cross ^{(nl)} ^{(fr)}		Huy		50.531625°N 5.220689°E	61031-CLT-0014-01 Info	Calvarie van Thier de Statte
Old church of Saint-Mengold ^{(nl)} ^{(fr)}		Huy		50.518258°N 5.241912°E	61031-CLT-0015-01 Info	Oude kerk van Saint-Mengold More images
House, called Tour d'Oultremont ^{(nl)} ^{(fr)}		Huy	rue du Palais de Justice n°7	50.519365°N 5.243006°E	61031-CLT-0016-01 Info	Huis, genaamd Tour d'Oultremont
The old fountain on the market called BASSINIA ^{(nl)} ^{(fr)}		Huy		50.518074°N 5.240894°E	61031-CLT-0017-01 Info	De monumentale fontein op de markt, genaamd Bassinia, uit de 15e en 18e eeuw More images
Old pilgrim shelter of the Abbey of Val-Saint-Lambert, called Maison Batta ^{(nl)} ^{(fr)}		Huy	avenue de Batta n°s 3-7	50.518755°N 5.234850°E	61031-CLT-0019-01 Info	Onderdak van de abdij van Val-Saint-Lambert, genaamd maison Batta
Hôtel de la Cloche ^{(nl)} ^{(fr)}		Huy	quai de la Batte n° 9	50.521251°N 5.237103°E	61031-CLT-0020-01 Info	Hôtel de la Cloche More images
Hospice d'Oultremont ^{(nl)} ^{(fr)}		Huy	rue de Namur n°1	50.518623°N 5.237393°E	61031-CLT-0021-01 Info	Hospice d'Oultremont More images
Six chapels ^{(nl)} ^{(fr)}		Huy	chemin des Chapelles	50.514407°N 5.247141°E	61031-CLT-0022-01 Info	Zes kapellen More images
Old Abbey Neufmoustier: two wings of the old monastery, facade and crypt statue of Pierre L'Ermite ^{(nl)} ^{(fr)}		Huy	avenue Louis Chainaye	50.525701°N 5.244315°E	61031-CLT-0024-01 Info	Oude abdij van Neufmoustier: twee vleugels van het oude klooster, gevel, crypte en standbeeld van Pierre l'Ermite More images
Fort van Huy ^{(nl)} ^{(fr)}		Huy		50.517868°N 5.237675°E	61031-CLT-0025-01 Info	Fort van Huy, chaussées Napoléon More images
Old Grain Exchange, today home of Fondation Bolly-Charlier ^{(nl)} ^{(fr)}		Huy	place Verte n° 6	50.518161°N 5.241559°E	61031-CLT-0026-01 Info	Oude graanbeurs, tegenworodig huis van Fondation Bolly-Charlier More images
Town hall ^{(nl)} ^{(fr)}		Huy	Huy	50.518330°N 5.241225°E	61031-CLT-0031-01 Info	Raadhuis More images
Hotel: facades, roofs and porch ^{(nl)} ^{(fr)}		Huy	rue l'Apleit n°15	50.519674°N 5.239614°E	61031-CLT-0032-01 Info	Hôtel: gevels, daken en portaal
Town walls (ramparts) ^{(nl)} ^{(fr)}		Huy		50.517640°N 5.244495°E	61031-CLT-0033-01 Info	Wallen More images
House "Lebrun" ^{(nl)} ^{(fr)}		Huy	rue l'Apleit n° 8	50.519824°N 5.240269°E	61031-CLT-0034-01 Info	Huis "Lebrun": gevels en daken
citadel and the site of Mont Picard ^{(nl)} ^{(fr)}		Huy		50.514853°N 5.224830°E	61031-CLT-0036-01 Info	Site van het ensemble van de citadel en de terreinen van Mont Picard More images
house ^{(nl)} ^{(fr)}		Huy	rue du Pont n°16	50.519000°N 5.238896°E	61031-CLT-0037-01 Info	Huis: gevels en daken
house ^{(nl)} ^{(fr)}		Huy	rue l'Apleit n° 9	50.519583°N 5.239990°E	61031-CLT-0038-01 Info	
Park Vierset ^{(nl)} ^{(fr)}		Huy	rue Rioul	50.523707°N 5.243014°E	61031-CLT-0039-01 Info	
Street ^{(nl)} ^{(fr)}		Huy	Rue des Frères Mineurs	50.518400°N 5.241068°E	61031-CLT-0040-01 Info	Rue des Frères Mineurs More images
Cottage, named "Alba Ministries" and Ruelle des Larrons ^{(nl)} ^{(fr)}		Huy	la ruelle des Larrons	50.518722°N 5.246565°E	61031-CLT-0041-01 Info	
house ^{(nl)} ^{(fr)}		Huy	rue des Tanneurs n° 23	50.516179°N 5.240658°E	61031-CLT-0042-01 Info	Huis: gevels en daken
church Saint-Germain: tower and choir ^{(nl)} ^{(fr)}		Huy		50.514658°N 5.178771°E	61031-CLT-0044-01 Info	Kerk Saint-Germain: toren en koor More images
Stations of the Cross with two linden trees ^{(nl)} ^{(fr)}		Huy		50.483476°N 5.191410°E	61031-CLT-0049-01 Info	Ensemble van de lindeboom, het kruisbeeld en de directe omgeving
citadel extension ^{(nl)} ^{(fr)}		Huy	Ben-Ahin	50.516457°N 5.224999°E	61031-CLT-0050-01 Info	
Ile des Béguines & Ile des Chanoines ^{(nl)} ^{(fr)}		Huy		50.505855°N 5.140921°E	61031-CLT-0051-01 Info	
Church of Sainte-Gertrude ^{(nl)} ^{(fr)}		Huy		50.530201°N 5.288722°E	61031-CLT-0052-01 Info	Kerk Sainte-Gertrude More images
house ^{(nl)} ^{(fr)}		Huy	rue du Centre n° 26	50.526645°N 5.257130°E	61031-CLT-0053-01 Info	
Church of Sainte-Margueritte ^{(nl)} ^{(fr)}		Huy		50.526645°N 5.257496°E	61031-CLT-0054-01 Info	
Cense de Solières farmhouse ^{(nl)} ^{(fr)}		Huy	Rue du Crucifix n° 1	50.486547°N 5.181454°E	61031-CLT-0056-01 Info	Boerderij genaamd Cense de Solières: gevels en daken
house ^{(nl)} ^{(fr)}		Huy	rue Sous-le-Château n° 42	50.517452°N 5.238724°E	61031-CLT-0057-01 Info	Huis: hoofdgevel en voorzijde dak More images
house ^{(nl)} ^{(fr)}		Huy	rue René Dubois n°s 71-73	50.530343°N 5.219404°E	61031-CLT-0058-01 Info	
house ^{(nl)} ^{(fr)}		Huy	rue des Augustins n° 15	50.519442°N 5.240890°E	61031-CLT-0059-01 Info	
house ^{(nl)} ^{(fr)}		Huy	rue Griange n° 11	50.517668°N 5.241603°E	61031-CLT-0061-01 Info	Gebouw: gevel en totaliteit van het dak
house ^{(nl)} ^{(fr)}		Huy	Grand'Place n° 7	50.517963°N 5.241312°E	61031-CLT-0062-01 Info	
fort Beaufort ^{(nl)} ^{(fr)}		Huy		50.517052°N 5.194650°E	61031-CLT-0063-01 Info	
house and tower ^{(nl)} ^{(fr)}		Huy	rue René Dubois n° 13	50.528528°N 5.220820°E	61031-CLT-0064-01 Info	
Solières river valley ^{(nl)} ^{(fr)}		Huy		50.494242°N 5.181081°E	61031-CLT-0065-01 Info	Vallei van de stroom van Solières
well ^{(nl)} ^{(fr)}		Huy	rue des Cyclamens	50.512705°N 5.220021°E	61031-CLT-0066-01 Info	
house ^{(nl)} ^{(fr)}		Huy	rue des Rotisseurs n° 24	50.518835°N 5.239780°E	61031-CLT-0067-01 Info	Gevels en daken van het gebouw
house ^{(nl)} ^{(fr)}		Huy	Huy	50.504541°N 5.273495°E	61031-CLT-0068-01 Info	
Castle Beaufort ruins ^{(nl)} ^{(fr)}		Huy		50.517893°N 5.193408°E	61031-CLT-0069-01 Info	Ruïnes van kasteel van Beaufort
house ^{(nl)} ^{(fr)}		Huy	rue du Marché n° 47	50.518244°N 5.244212°E	61031-CLT-0070-01 Info	Huis: gevels en daken van het hoofdgebouw en de aanbouw met een toegangspoort, uitsluiting van het geheel van de aanbouw loodrecht op de achterkant
Former abbey Palace of Solière ^{(nl)} ^{(fr)}		Huy		50.478945°N 5.176867°E	61031-CLT-0071-01 Info	
Chapel Saint Eutrope and spring ^{(nl)} ^{(fr)}		Huy	rue du Vieux Moulin	50.479270°N 5.177997°E	61031-CLT-0072-01 Info	
Castle Bonne Espérance ^{(nl)} ^{(fr)}		Huy	rue Bonne espérance n°s 37-37A	50.521282°N 5.268808°E	61031-CLT-0073-01 Info	
house Loumaye (Château Bodart) ^{(nl)} ^{(fr)}		Huy	rue Bonne-Espérance n° 34-35	50.521415°N 5.268711°E	61031-CLT-0074-01 Info	
Pastorage house ^{(nl)} ^{(fr)}		Huy	rue Saint-Mengold, n° 5	50.517999°N 5.242142°E	61031-CLT-0075-01 Info	
Park of Castle Van Zuylen ^{(nl)} ^{(fr)}		Huy		50.519994°N 5.205462°E	61031-CLT-0076-01 Info	
Chapel Saint-Roch à Ben-Ahin ^{(nl)} ^{(fr)}		Huy	Ben-Ahin	50.511062°N 5.181851°E	61031-CLT-0078-01 Info	
house ^{(nl)} ^{(fr)}		Huy	rue du Pont n°s 26-28	50.519240°N 5.238696°E	61031-CLT-0079-01 Info	Huis: hoofdgevel, puntgevel brugzijde, daken More images
house ^{(nl)} ^{(fr)}		Huy	rue du Marché n° 39	50.518054°N 5.243864°E	61031-CLT-0080-01 Info	Huis: gevels, daken, puntgevel
house ^{(nl)} ^{(fr)}		Huy	place Saint-Denis, n° 4	50.518643°N 5.245187°E	61031-CLT-0081-01 Info	
house ^{(nl)} ^{(fr)}		Huy	rue du Marais n° 135	50.528860°N 5.254793°E	61031-CLT-0082-01 Info	Huis: hoofdgevel, puntgevel, daken
house ^{(nl)} ^{(fr)}		Huy	rue du Marais n° 137	50.528820°N 5.254720°E	61031-CLT-0083-01 Info	
West gable with decorative arches, remains of the leper colony of Grands Malades, and the remains of the eastern gable (ground floor) and the interior with the remains of arches ^{(nl)} ^{(fr)}		Huy	quai de Compiègne 54, Huy	50.530493°N 5.240946°E	61031-CLT-0084-01 Info	
Ruins of the tower Gabelle and adjoining wall ^{(nl)} ^{(fr)}		Huy	chaussée des Forges n° 4	50.512592°N 5.241008°E	61031-CLT-0085-01 Info	
Farmhouse of former leper colony Grand Malades ^{(nl)} ^{(fr)}		Huy	chaussée de Waremme, ongeveer bij n° 142	50.530545°N 5.238576°E	61031-CLT-0086-01 Info	
Kakyerie house ^{(nl)} ^{(fr)}		Huy	Quai de Compiègne n° 62	50.536003°N 5.252588°E	61031-CLT-0087-01 Info	Huis, genaamd Kakyerie
parts of the old monastery of the Crosiers (Canons Regular of the Order of the Holy Cross): The 18th century entrance porch, the surrounding wall common to the old pub and porch, and the old brewery (wall and roof) ^{(nl)} ^{(fr)}		Huy	rue des Larrons n° 23	50.516175°N 5.242143°E	61031-CLT-0091-01 Info	Bepaalde delen van het oude klooster van de kruisheren: de ingangsportiek Lodewijk XIV, de omliggende muur gemeenschappelijk voor de oude brasserie en portiek, en de oude brasserie (gevel en dak) More images
Church Notre-Dame de la Sarte ^{(nl)} ^{(fr)}		Huy		50.513872°N 5.250436°E	61031-CLT-0093-01 Info	Kerk Notre-Dame de la Sarte
house cellar ^{(nl)} ^{(fr)}		Huy	rue des Frères Mineurs n° 6 (M)	50.518171°N 5.242698°E	61031-CLT-0094-01 Info	
"Legrand" house ^{(nl)} ^{(fr)}		Huy	rue des Frères Mineurs n°1	50.518047°N 5.242543°E	61031-CLT-0096-01 Info	Huis genaamd "Legrand" More images
house ^{(nl)} ^{(fr)}		Huy	rue du Pont n°18	50.519034°N 5.238865°E	61031-CLT-0097-01 Info	Huis: gevels en daken
collegiate church of Notre-Dame, except the organ ^{(nl)} ^{(fr)}		Huy		50.518824°N 5.238167°E	61031-PEX-0001-01 Info	
Old fountain named Bassinia ^{(nl)} ^{(fr)}		Huy		50.518074°N 5.240894°E	61031-PEX-0002-01 Info	

== See also ==
- List of protected heritage sites in Liège (province)
- Huy
