= List of immovable heritage sites in Hasselt (part 1) =

This table shows an overview of the immovable heritage sites in the Flemish town Hasselt. This list is part of Belgium's national heritage.

Object	Status^{?}	Year/architect	Town/section	Address	Coordinates	Number^{?}	Image
House "Het Verxken" or "Het Wilt Vercken" ^{(nl)} ^{(fr)}			Hasselt	Aldestraat 10-12	50.93041°N 5.33475°E	21834 Info	
Neoclassical house ^{(nl)} ^{(fr)}			Hasselt	Aldestraat 16	50.93041°N 5.33475°E	21834 Info	
The Golden House Swaen ^{(nl)} ^{(fr)}			Hasselt	Aldestraat 29	50.93041°N 5.33475°E	21834 Info	
Neoclassical house ^{(nl)} ^{(fr)}			Hasselt	Aldestraat 34	50.93041°N 5.33475°E	21834 Info	
Neoclassical house ^{(nl)} ^{(fr)}			Hasselt	Aldestraat 36	50.93041°N 5.33475°E	21834 Info	
Neoclassical house ^{(nl)} ^{(fr)}			Hasselt	Aldestraat 46	50.93041°N 5.33475°E	21834 Info	
Neoclassical house ^{(nl)} ^{(fr)}			Hasselt	Aldestraat 48	50.93041°N 5.33475°E	21834 Info	
Neoclassical house ^{(nl)} ^{(fr)}			Hasselt	Aldestraat 50	50.93041°N 5.33475°E	21834 Info	
Neoclassical house ^{(nl)} ^{(fr)}			Hasselt	Aldestraat 52	50.93041°N 5.33475°E	21834 Info	
Mansion ^{(nl)} ^{(fr)}			Hasselt	Aldestraat 38	50.93019°N 5.33536°E	21843 Info	
House "Heusden" ^{(nl)} ^{(fr)}	Yes		Hasselt	Aldestraat 44	50.93032°N 5.33500°E	21844 Info	
House "The Lombard Huys" ^{(nl)} ^{(fr)}	Yes		Hasselt	Aldestraat 53	50.93076°N 5.33492°E	21845 Info	
houses ^{(nl)} ^{(fr)}			Hasselt	Badderijstraat 21	50.93215°N 5.34209°E	21846 Info	
houses ^{(nl)} ^{(fr)}			Hasselt	Badderijstraat 23	50.93215°N 5.34209°E	21846 Info	
houses ^{(nl)} ^{(fr)}			Hasselt	Badderijstraat 24	50.93215°N 5.34209°E	21846 Info	
neoclassical corner house ^{(nl)} ^{(fr)}			Hasselt	Bampslaan 4	50.92985°N 5.33144°E	21850 Info	
Neoclassical mansion ^{(nl)} ^{(fr)}			Hasselt	Bampslaan 13	50.93030°N 5.33141°E	21851 Info	
Left Home "ANTVERPIA" ^{(nl)} ^{(fr)}			Hasselt	Bampslaan 26	50.93019°N 5.33035°E	21852 Info	
Right House "ANTVERPIA" ^{(nl)} ^{(fr)}			Hasselt	Bampslaan 28	50.93019°N 5.33035°E	21852 Info	
Mansion, corner house ^{(nl)} ^{(fr)}			Hasselt	Bampslaan 37	50.93060°N 5.33005°E	21853 Info	
House "Den Eendenbeck" ^{(nl)}			Hasselt	Bonnefantenstraat 19	50.93313°N 5.33997°E	21856 Info	
Flat, wide house ^{(nl)} ^{(fr)}			Hasselt	Bonnefantenstraat 26	50.93322°N 5.33968°E	21857 Info	
Flat, wide house ^{(nl)} ^{(fr)}			Hasselt	Botermarkt 5	50.93049°N 5.33838°E	21858 Info	
House "At the Golden Scissors" ^{(nl)}			Hasselt	Botermarkt 17	50.93035°N 5.33887°E	21859 Info	
House "De Mereminne" ^{(nl)}			Hasselt	Botermarkt 19	50.93035°N 5.33895°E	21860 Info	
Homes, part of the former "De Keyser Croon" ^{(nl)} ^{(fr)}			Hasselt	Botermarkt 22	50.93058°N 5.33866°E	21861 Info	
Homes, part of the former "De Keyser Croon" ^{(nl)} ^{(fr)}			Hasselt	Botermarkt 24	50.93058°N 5.33866°E	21861 Info	
House "De Roosemarynboom" ^{(nl)}			Hasselt	Botermarkt 26	50.93057°N 5.33889°E	21862 Info	
Corner house "De Drij Dragonders" ^{(nl)}	Yes		Hasselt	Botermarkt 28	50.93057°N 5.33913°E	21863 Info	
House, now pub ^{(nl)} ^{(fr)}			Hasselt	Casterstraat 46	50.92786°N 5.34949°E	21864 Info	
Corner house of 1867 ^{(nl)} ^{(fr)}			Hasselt	Demerstraat 2	50.93077°N 5.33755°E	21865 Info	
House "Het Boogsken" or "Den Gulden Boog" ^{(nl)}			Hasselt	Demerstraat 3	50.93078°N 5.33792°E	21866 Info	
Property of 1867 ^{(nl)} ^{(fr)}			Hasselt	Demerstraat 4	50.93090°N 5.33757°E	21867 Info	
Neoclassical homes ^{(nl)} ^{(fr)}			Hasselt	Demerstraat 6-8	50.93097°N 5.33751°E	21868 Info	
Neoclassical homes ^{(nl)} ^{(fr)}			Hasselt	Demerstraat 12	50.93097°N 5.33751°E	21868 Info	
Neoclassical homes ^{(nl)} ^{(fr)}			Hasselt	Demerstraat 12	50.93097°N 5.33751°E	21868 Info	
House "Den IJseren Hoedt" ^{(nl)}			Hasselt	Demerstraat 9	50.93092°N 5.33801°E	21869 Info	
House "Het Groot Fortuyn", former distillery ^{(nl)}			Hasselt	Demerstraat 21	50.93133°N 5.33828°E	21871 Info	
House "Sint-Joseph" ^{(nl)}			Hasselt	Demerstraat 33	50.93157°N 5.33816°E	21872 Info	
House "De Fransche Kroon", former jenever distillery ^{(nl)}			Hasselt	Demerstraat 37	50.93173°N 5.33828°E	21873 Info	
Two houses, wide houses ^{(nl)} ^{(fr)}			Hasselt	Demerstraat 39	50.93179°N 5.33820°E	21874 Info	
Two houses, wide houses ^{(nl)} ^{(fr)}			Hasselt	Demerstraat 41	50.93179°N 5.33820°E	21874 Info	
House "De Warande", former jenever distillery ^{(nl)}			Hasselt	Demerstraat 43-45	50.93189°N 5.33817°E	21875 Info	
House in neoclassical style ^{(nl)} ^{(fr)}			Hasselt	Demerstraat 46	50.93383°N 5.33914°E	21876 Info	
House in neoclassical style ^{(nl)} ^{(fr)}			Hasselt	Demerstraat 48	50.93383°N 5.33914°E	21876 Info	
Houses in neoclassical style ^{(nl)} ^{(fr)}			Hasselt	Demerstraat 49	50.93383°N 5.33914°E	21876 Info	
Houses in neoclassical style ^{(nl)} ^{(fr)}			Hasselt	Demerstraat 50	50.93383°N 5.33914°E	21876 Info	
Houses in neoclassical style ^{(nl)} ^{(fr)}			Hasselt	Demerstraat 53	50.93383°N 5.33914°E	21876 Info	
Houses in neoclassical style ^{(nl)} ^{(fr)}			Hasselt	Demerstraat 68	50.93383°N 5.33914°E	21876 Info	
Houses in neoclassical style ^{(nl)} ^{(fr)}			Hasselt	Demerstraat 70	50.93383°N 5.33914°E	21876 Info	
Houses in neoclassical style ^{(nl)} ^{(fr)}			Hasselt	Demerstraat 72	50.93383°N 5.33914°E	21876 Info	
Houses in neoclassical style ^{(nl)} ^{(fr)}			Hasselt	Demerstraat 74	50.93383°N 5.33914°E	21876 Info	
Houses in neoclassical style ^{(nl)} ^{(fr)}			Hasselt	Demerstraat 76	50.93383°N 5.33914°E	21876 Info	
Houses in neoclassical style ^{(nl)} ^{(fr)}			Hasselt	Demerstraat 78	50.93383°N 5.33914°E	21876 Info	
Houses in neoclassical style ^{(nl)} ^{(fr)}			Hasselt	Demerstraat 88		21876 Info	
Houses in neoclassical style ^{(nl)} ^{(fr)}			Hasselt	Demerstraat 90		21876 Info	
Houses in neoclassical style ^{(nl)} ^{(fr)}			Hasselt	Demerstraat 92		21876 Info	
Houses in neoclassical style ^{(nl)} ^{(fr)}			Hasselt	Demerstraat 94		21876 Info	
house ^{(nl)} ^{(fr)}			Hasselt	Demerstraat 58	50.93280°N 5.33834°E	21877 Info	
House "De Gulden Spoor" ^{(nl)}			Hasselt	Demerstraat 69	50.93258°N 5.33869°E	21878 Info	
Corner house "The Prince of Luyck" ^{(nl)}			Hasselt	Diesterstraat 1	50.93044°N 5.33291°E	21881 Info	
Corner house ^{(nl)}			Hasselt	Diesterstraat 24-26	50.93044°N 5.33291°E	21881 Info	
Corner houses ^{(nl)} ^{(fr)}			Hasselt	Thonissenlaan 1	50.93044°N 5.33291°E	21881 Info	
House "De Kleyn Gasthuyskerck" ^{(nl)}			Hasselt	Diesterstraat 4	50.93005°N 5.33357°E	21882 Info	
House "Die Witte Lersse" ^{(nl)}			Hasselt	Diesterstraat 6	50.93009°N 5.33355°E	21883 Info	
House "De Witte Leeuw" ^{(nl)}			Hasselt	Diesterstraat 8	50.93009°N 5.33345°E	21884 Info	
house ^{(nl)} ^{(fr)}			Hasselt	Diesterstraat 9	50.93045°N 5.33371°E	21885 Info	
House "In den Gaper" ^{(nl)}			Hasselt	Diesterstraat 11	50.93045°N 5.33362°E	21886 Info	
The Peasant Dance House ^{(nl)} ^{(fr)}			Hasselt	Diesterstraat 13	50.93068°N 5.33363°E	21887 Info	
House "De Wal" ^{(nl)}			Hasselt	Diesterstraat 15	50.93046°N 5.33338°E	21889 Info	
house ^{(nl)} ^{(fr)}			Hasselt	Diesterstraat 18	50.93027°N 5.33318°E	21890 Info	
House "Cornu" ^{(nl)}	Yes		Hasselt	Diesterstraat 20	50.93029°N 5.33303°E	21891 Info	
Neoclassical house ^{(nl)} ^{(fr)}			Hasselt	Dokter Willemsstraat 12	50.93086°N 5.33399°E	21892 Info	
Neoclassical house ^{(nl)} ^{(fr)}			Hasselt	Dokter Willemsstraat 22	50.93086°N 5.33399°E	21892 Info	
Neoclassical house ^{(nl)} ^{(fr)}			Hasselt	Dokter Willemsstraat 26	50.93086°N 5.33399°E	21892 Info	
Neoclassical house ^{(nl)} ^{(fr)}			Hasselt	Dokter Willemsstraat 30	50.93086°N 5.33399°E	21892 Info	
house ^{(nl)} ^{(fr)}			Hasselt	Dokter Willemsstraat 24	50.93095°N 5.33405°E	21893 Info	
House of L. Willems (former) ^{(nl)}	Yes		Hasselt	Dokter Willemsstraat 28	50.93109°N 5.33401°E	21894 Info	
Property in neotraditionele style ^{(nl)} ^{(fr)}			Hasselt	Dorpsstraat 8	50.93205°N 5.33556°E	21895 Info	
house ^{(nl)} ^{(fr)}			Hasselt	Dorpsstraat 13	50.93213°N 5.33511°E	21897 Info	
Flat, wide house ^{(nl)} ^{(fr)}			Hasselt	Fruitmarkt 3	50.93006°N 5.33787°E	21898 Info	
Flat, wide house ^{(nl)} ^{(fr)}			Hasselt	Fruitmarkt 14	50.93038°N 5.33837°E	21899 Info	
Hospital St. Barbaradal and gray convent ^{(nl)} ^{(fr)}	Yes		Hasselt	Thonissenlaan 75	50.93398°N 5.33858°E	21900 Info	
The section house Nieuwen Bauw, former hotel ^{(nl)} ^{(fr)}	Yes		Hasselt	Groenplein	50.93105°N 5.33694°E	21901 Info	More images
Huizen "De Draeck" en "De Sleutel" ^{(nl)}	Yes		Hasselt	Grote Markt	50.92947°N 5.33702°E	21903 Info	
House "De Voetboge Camer" ^{(nl)}	Yes		Hasselt	Grote Markt 2	50.92957°N 5.33697°E	21904 Info	
House "Het Sweert" ^{(nl)}	Yes		Hasselt	Grote Markt 3	50.92963°N 5.33702°E	21905 Info	
House "Den Cop" or "Den Gulden Cop" ^{(nl)}			Hasselt	Grote Markt 5	50.92968°N 5.33758°E	21906 Info	
House "Die Kettel" or "De Gouden Ketting" ^{(nl)}			Hasselt	Grote Markt 9	50.92963°N 5.33791°E	21908 Info	
House "De Koning van Polen" ^{(nl)}	Yes		Hasselt	Grote Markt 11	50.92957°N 5.33802°E	21909 Info	
house ^{(nl)} ^{(fr)}			Hasselt	Grote Markt 13	50.92937°N 5.33829°E	21910 Info	
House "Het Slot" ^{(nl)}			Hasselt	Grote Markt 14	50.92933°N 5.33818°E	21911 Info	
Corner house "De Drij Pistolen" ^{(nl)}	Yes		Hasselt	Grote Markt 15	50.92928°N 5.33810°E	21912 Info	
Buildings with shopping arcade ^{(nl)} ^{(fr)}			Hasselt	Grote Markt 16-17-18	50.92917°N 5.33773°E	21913 Info	
Augustinian Monastery (former) ^{(nl)} ^{(fr)}			Hasselt	Havermarkt 45	50.92951°N 5.33445°E	21914 Info	
House "De Cleyne Draeck" ^{(nl)}			Hasselt	Havermarkt	50.92943°N 5.33702°E	21915 Info	
House "De Pandour" or "De Roode Engel" ^{(nl)}			Hasselt	Havermarkt 3	50.92948°N 5.33692°E	21916 Info	
House "Het Leerske" or "Die Leerse" ^{(nl)}	Yes		Hasselt	Havermarkt 4	50.92924°N 5.33692°E	21917 Info	
Commercial Court neoclassical mansion ^{(nl)} ^{(fr)}	Yes		Hasselt	Havermarkt 8	50.92911°N 5.33663°E	21918 Info	
Court ^{(nl)} ^{(fr)}			Hasselt	Havermarkt 10	50.92893°N 5.33619°E	21919 Info	
house "De Sterre" ^{(nl)}			Hasselt	Havermarkt 11	50.92950°N 5.33633°E	21920 Info	
house "De Seehondt" ^{(nl)}			Hasselt	Havermarkt 13	50.92950°N 5.33633°E	21920 Info	
corner house "De Gulden Sadel" ^{(nl)}	Yes		Hasselt	Havermarkt 12	50.92903°N 5.33577°E	21921 Info	
Flat, wide house ^{(nl)} ^{(fr)}			Hasselt	Havermarkt 14	50.92897°N 5.33556°E	21922 Info	
house "De Kleyne Gulden Put" ^{(nl)}			Hasselt	Havermarkt 19	50.92944°N 5.33589°E	21923 Info	
mansion "Den Cleynen Eenhoeren" ^{(nl)}	Yes		Hasselt	Havermarkt 22	50.92912°N 5.33505°E	21924 Info	
house "De Gulden Put" ^{(nl)}	Yes		Hasselt	Havermarkt 21	50.92951°N 5.33569°E	21925 Info	
house "De Gulden Put" ^{(nl)}	Yes		Hasselt	Havermarkt 23	50.92951°N 5.33569°E	21925 Info	
mansion "De Groote Eenhoren" ^{(nl)}			Hasselt	Havermarkt 24	50.92906°N 5.33479°E	21926 Info	
mansion "Sint-Augustinus" ^{(nl)}			Hasselt	Havermarkt 28	50.92909°N 5.33462°E	21927 Info	
house "De Cat" ^{(nl)}	Yes		Hasselt	Havermarkt 27	50.92942°N 5.33550°E	21928 Info	
neoclassical house ^{(nl)} ^{(fr)}			Hasselt	Havermarkt 29	50.92942°N 5.33539°E	21929 Info	
post Office ^{(nl)} ^{(fr)}	Yes		Hasselt	Havermarkt 31-33	50.92948°N 5.33516°E	21930 Info	
Mansion in eclectic style of 1913 ^{(nl)} ^{(fr)}	Yes		Hasselt	Havermarkt 32	50.92909°N 5.33428°E	21931 Info	
Baroque corner house in the 1925 ^{(nl)} ^{(fr)}	Yes		Hasselt	Havermarkt 47	50.92954°N 5.33412°E	21933 Info	
Sacred Heart Parish ^{(nl)} ^{(fr)}	Yes		Hasselt	Plantenstraat 75	50.93543°N 5.32688°E	21934 Info	
house "Het Corenvat" en "Het Cleyn Coren vat" ^{(nl)}			Hasselt	Botermarkt 25	50.93022°N 5.33936°E	21935 Info	
mansion "Het Hemelrijk" ^{(nl)}	Yes		Hasselt	Hemelrijk 13	50.93004°N 5.33987°E	21936 Info	
mansion "De Helm" ^{(nl)}	Yes		Hasselt	Hoogstraat 1	50.92975°N 5.33761°E	21937 Info	
house "De Roos" ^{(nl)}	Yes		Hasselt	Hoogstraat 2	50.92983°N 5.33724°E	21938 Info	
house "De Seven Weeen" ^{(nl)}			Hasselt	Hoogstraat 4	50.92993°N 5.33722°E	21939 Info	
house "De Reep" or "Moriaenshoek" ^{(nl)}			Hasselt	Hoogstraat 5	50.92992°N 5.33772°E	21940 Info	
house "De Suikerton" or "De Suikerpot" ^{(nl)}			Hasselt	Hoogstraat 7	50.92997°N 5.33773°E	21941 Info	
house "De Dry Cronen", apotheek ^{(nl)}			Hasselt	Hoogstraat 8	50.93005°N 5.33720°E	21942 Info	
house "Het Molenyser" ^{(nl)}			Hasselt	Hoogstraat 9	50.93004°N 5.33763°E	21943 Info	
house "Het Swert Schaep" ^{(nl)}			Hasselt	Hoogstraat 12	50.93013°N 5.33724°E	21944 Info	
Flat, wide house ^{(nl)} ^{(fr)}			Hasselt	Hoogstraat 15	50.93035°N 5.33773°E	21945 Info	
house "De Pereboom" ^{(nl)}			Hasselt	Hoogstraat 24	50.93044°N 5.33747°E	21948 Info	
house "De Molensteen" ^{(nl)}	Yes		Hasselt	Hoogstraat 26	50.93049°N 5.33738°E	21949 Info	
Homes, houses wide ^{(nl)} ^{(fr)}			Hasselt	Isabellastraat 13	50.93271°N 5.33635°E	21950 Info	
Homes, houses wide ^{(nl)} ^{(fr)}			Hasselt	Isabellastraat 15	50.93271°N 5.33635°E	21950 Info	
Homes, houses wide ^{(nl)} ^{(fr)}			Hasselt	Isabellastraat 17	50.93271°N 5.33635°E	21950 Info	
Homes, houses wide ^{(nl)} ^{(fr)}			Hasselt	Isabellastraat 19	50.93271°N 5.33635°E	21950 Info	
Chapel of Our Lady Virga Jesse ^{(nl)}	Yes		Hasselt	Kapelstraat	50.92973°N 5.33631°E	21952 Info	More images
house "Den Crans" ^{(nl)}	Yes		Hasselt	Kapelstraat 1	50.92983°N 5.33724°E	21953 Info	
house "Het Kalf" or "Het Gulden Kalf" ^{(nl)}			Hasselt	Kapelstraat 4	50.92969°N 5.33698°E	21954 Info	
house "Den Turck" later "De Forteyne" ^{(nl)}	Yes		Hasselt	Kapelstraat 3	50.92986°N 5.33710°E	21955 Info	
house "De Gulden Borsse" or "Gulden Beurse" ^{(nl)}	Yes		Hasselt	Kapelstraat 5	50.92989°N 5.33704°E	21956 Info	
house "Den Swarten Hoedt" ^{(nl)}			Hasselt	Kapelstraat 6A-6B	50.92970°N 5.33691°E	21957 Info	
house "De Groote Pellicaen", voormalige herberg ^{(nl)}	Yes		Hasselt	Kapelstraat 43	50.93011°N 5.33513°E	21958 Info	
house "De Kleine Mortier" or "Het Oud College" ^{(nl)}			Hasselt	Kapelstraat 44	50.92977°N 5.33414°E	21959 Info	
mansion "De Gulden Mortier" ^{(nl)}			Hasselt	Kapelstraat 46	50.92981°N 5.33401°E	21960 Info	
house "De Groote Seyssen" or "Die Gulden Seyssen" ^{(nl)}			Hasselt	Kapelstraat 47	50.93001°N 5.33491°E	21961 Info	
house "Sinte-Geertruyde" ^{(nl)}			Hasselt	Kapelstraat 48	50.92987°N 5.33393°E	21962 Info	
house "De Arent" or "Den Swerten Aer" ^{(nl)}	Yes		Hasselt	Kapelstraat 49	50.93010°N 5.33462°E	21963 Info	
house "Het Lombardenhuys" ^{(nl)}	Yes		Hasselt	Kapelstraat 51	50.93003°N 5.33445°E	21964 Info	
house "De Reep" ^{(nl)}			Hasselt	Kapelstraat 55	50.93010°N 5.33414°E	21965 Info	
house "De Wijzer" ^{(nl)}			Hasselt	Kapelstraat 57	50.93013°N 5.33402°E	21966 Info	
Meeting House Literary Society ^{(nl)} ^{(fr)}	Yes		Hasselt	Koning Albertstraat 1	50.92925°N 5.33709°E	21967 Info	
house "De Bruyne Visch" ^{(nl)}			Hasselt	Koning Albertstraat 5-7	50.92903°N 5.33698°E	21968 Info	

== See also ==
- List of onroerend erfgoed in Limburg (Belgium)
- Hasselt
