= List of protected heritage sites in Walhain =

This table shows an overview of the protected heritage sites in the Walloon town Walhain. This list is part of Belgium's national heritage.

Object	Year/architect	Town/section	Address	Coordinates	Number^{?}	Image
Ruins of the feudal castle ^{(nl)} ^{(fr)}		Walhain		50.613781°N 4.694855°E	25124-CLT-0002-01 Info	Ruines van feodaal kasteel
Ensemble of the ruins of the medieval castle ^{(nl)} ^{(fr)}		Walhain		50.612356°N 4.692703°E	25124-CLT-0003-01 Info	Ensemble van de ruïnes van het middeleeuwse kasteel
Brick Windmill called "du Tiège" ^{(nl)} ^{(fr)}		Walhain		50.643543°N 4.669255°E	25124-CLT-0004-01 Info	Windmolen van baksteen: "du Tiège"
Tower of Sarrasins ^{(nl)} ^{(fr)}		Walhain		50.631878°N 4.633012°E	25124-CLT-0005-01 Info	
Tumuli of Libersart, ensemble of two tumuli and environment ^{(nl)} ^{(fr)}		Walhain		50.654587°N 4.722527°E	25124-CLT-0006-01 Info	Tumuli van Libersart, ensemble van twee tumuli en omgeving
Tumuli of Libersart, ensemble of tumuli and surrounding area ^{(nl)} ^{(fr)}		Walhain		50.654822°N 4.721299°E	25124-CLT-0007-01 Info	Tumuli van Libersart, ensemble van tumuli en omliggend terrein
Tumuli of Libersart, archaeological site ^{(nl)} ^{(fr)}		Walhain		50.654587°N 4.722527°E	25124-PEX-0001-01 Info	
Tumuli of Libersart, fields with tumuli and surrounding area ^{(nl)} ^{(fr)}		Walhain		50.654822°N 4.721299°E	25124-PEX-0002-01 Info	

== See also ==
- Lists of protected heritage sites in Walloon Brabant
- Walhain
