= List of protected heritage sites in Bree, Belgium =

This table shows an overview of the protected heritage sites in the Flemish town Bree, Belgium. This list is part of Belgium's national heritage.

Object	Status^{?}	Year/architect	Town/section	Address	Coordinates	Number^{?}	Image
Chapel of the Three Sisters ^{(nl)} ^{(fr)}			Bree	Abroxweg	51.15652°N 5.60232°E	70778 Info	
Abroxmolen ^{(nl)}			Bree	Abroxweg 41	51.16600°N 5.59838°E	70779 Info	
Farm ^{(nl)} ^{(fr)}			Bree	Abroxweg 48	51.16570°N 5.59990°E	70780 Info	
U-shaped farm ^{(nl)} ^{(fr)}			Bree	Abroxweg 51	51.16783°N 5.60215°E	70781 Info	
Farmstead "Emeshof" ^{(nl)} ^{(fr)}			Bree	Genattestraat 31	51.16038°N 5.58770°E	70782 Info	
Genamolen ^{(nl)}	Yes		Bree	Genattestraat 39	51.16281°N 5.58992°E	70783 Info	
elongated farm of 1860 ^{(nl)} ^{(fr)}			Bree	Jef van Hoofstraat 9	51.15479°N 5.60554°E	70784 Info	
Our Lady Chapel ^{(nl)} ^{(fr)}			Bree	Kapelstraat	51.16038°N 5.59630°E	70785 Info	
St. Martin Parish ^{(nl)} ^{(fr)}	Yes		Bree	Kerkstraat	51.15502°N 5.60313°E	70786 Info	
Chapel of Our Lady of Peace ^{(nl)} ^{(fr)}			Bree	Kerkstraat	51.16131°N 5.60812°E	70787 Info	
Farm ^{(nl)} ^{(fr)}			Bree	Kerkstraat 1	51.15410°N 5.60202°E	70788 Info	
Farm ^{(nl)} ^{(fr)}			Bree	Kerkstraat 3	51.15410°N 5.60202°E	70788 Info	
Former presbytery ^{(nl)} ^{(fr)}			Bree	Kerkstraat 6	51.15456°N 5.60321°E	70789 Info	
Bipartisan farm of 1842 ^{(nl)} ^{(fr)}			Bree	Kerkstraat 31	51.15695°N 5.60382°E	70790 Info	
Farmstead "Mariahof" ^{(nl)} ^{(fr)}			Bree	Mariahofstraat 51	51.17787°N 5.66343°E	70791 Info	
Former watermill, Schoot ^{(nl)} ^{(fr)}			Bree	Schootstraat 64	51.15975°N 5.58211°E	70792 Info	
Farmstead "Kroezenhof" ^{(nl)} ^{(fr)}			Bree	Vennestraat 30	51.15863°N 5.58387°E	70793 Info	
Farmstead "Kroezenhof" ^{(nl)} ^{(fr)}			Bree	Vennestraat 32	51.15863°N 5.58387°E	70793 Info	
Farmstead "Kupkenshof" ^{(nl)} ^{(fr)}			Bree	Waterstraat 8	51.16956°N 5.60514°E	70794 Info	
Two house farm ^{(nl)} ^{(fr)}			Bree	Waterstraat 9	51.16824°N 5.61364°E	70795 Info	
Small house ^{(nl)} ^{(fr)}			Bree	Witte Torenwal 21	51.14248°N 5.59756°E	70796 Info	
Small house ^{(nl)} ^{(fr)}			Bree	Bocholterkiezel 5	51.14432°N 5.59374°E	70797 Info	
Detached house from the early XX ^{(nl)} ^{(fr)}			Bree	Bocholterkiezel 6	51.14456°N 5.59439°E	70798 Info	
Part of a former dual farm ^{(nl)} ^{(fr)}			Bree	Bocholterkiezel 13	51.14526°N 5.59374°E	70799 Info	
Farmstead "Mussenburghof" ^{(nl)} ^{(fr)}			Bree	Brugstraat 76	51.14198°N 5.61831°E	70800 Info	
Farmstead "Swennenhof" ^{(nl)} ^{(fr)}			Bree	Driehoevenstraat 21	51.14917°N 5.60334°E	70801 Info	
Corner house in eclectic style ^{(nl)} ^{(fr)}			Bree	Gerdingerpoort 1	51.14232°N 5.59487°E	70803 Info	
Former company P. Bergmans-Valle Houthandel ^{(nl)} ^{(fr)}			Bree	Gerdingerpoort 5	51.14261°N 5.59459°E	70804 Info	
house ^{(nl)}			Bree	Gerdingerpoort 7	51.14294°N 5.59373°E	70805 Info	
Mansion ^{(nl)}			Bree	Gerdingerpoort 10	51.14281°N 5.59486°E	70806 Info	
House "De Sterre" ^{(nl)}			Bree	Gerdingerstraat 1	51.14142°N 5.59587°E	70807 Info	
House "Die Swaene" ^{(nl)}			Bree	Gerdingerstraat 5	51.14154°N 5.59579°E	70808 Info	
House "Die Swaene" ^{(nl)} ^{(fr)}			Bree	Gerdingerstraat 7	51.14154°N 5.59579°E	70808 Info	
house with baroque views ^{(nl)} ^{(fr)}			Bree	Gerdingerstraat 8	51.14184°N 5.59585°E	70809 Info	
Broad house ^{(nl)} ^{(fr)}			Bree	Gerdingerstraat 10	51.14195°N 5.59589°E	70810 Info	
house ^{(nl)} ^{(fr)}			Bree	Gerdingerstraat 11	51.14168°N 5.59565°E	70811 Info	
Two large houses with identical façade decoration ^{(nl)} ^{(fr)}			Bree	Gerdingerstraat 13	51.14178°N 5.59547°E	70812 Info	
Two large houses with identical façade decoration ^{(nl)} ^{(fr)}			Bree	Gerdingerstraat 15	51.14178°N 5.59547°E	70812 Info	
house ^{(nl)} ^{(fr)}			Bree	Gerdingerstraat 17	51.14182°N 5.59542°E	70813 Info	
house ^{(nl)} ^{(fr)}			Bree	Gerdingerstraat 19	51.14184°N 5.59525°E	70814 Info	
Broad House late XIX-early XX ^{(nl)} ^{(fr)}			Bree	Gerdingerstraat 21	51.14190°N 5.59522°E	70815 Info	
house ^{(nl)} ^{(fr)}			Bree	Gerdingerstraat 23	51.14197°N 5.59521°E	70816 Info	
Primary school ^{(nl)} ^{(fr)}			Bree	Grauwe Torenwal 16	51.13921°N 5.59968°E	70817 Info	
detached house of XIXc ^{(nl)} ^{(fr)}			Bree	Gruitroderkiezel 6	51.13734°N 5.59367°E	70818 Info	
Detached villa ^{(nl)} ^{(fr)}			Bree	Gruitroderkiezel 46	51.13402°N 5.59265°E	70819 Info	
Castle "De Viggel" ^{(nl)}			Bree	Gruitroderkiezel 73	51.13187°N 5.59782°E	70820 Info	
Church of Our Lady of the Sacred Heart ^{(nl)} ^{(fr)}			Bree	Gruitroderkiezel 206	51.12224°N 5.59140°E	70821 Info	
St. Michael Parish ^{(nl)} ^{(fr)}	Yes		Bree	Hoogstraat	51.14117°N 5.59776°E	70822 Info	
Former inn "In de Croen" ^{(nl)} ^{(fr)}			Bree	Hoogstraat 2	51.14067°N 5.59804°E	70823 Info	
House early XX ^{(nl)} ^{(fr)}			Bree	Hoogstraat 4	51.14075°N 5.59815°E	70824 Info	
House early XX ^{(nl)} ^{(fr)}			Bree	Hoogstraat 6	51.14075°N 5.59815°E	70824 Info	
house in eclectic style ^{(nl)} ^{(fr)}			Bree	Hoogstraat 5	51.14144°N 5.59862°E	70827 Info	
House "De Rode Leeuw" ^{(nl)}			Bree	Hoogstraat 8	51.14079°N 5.59824°E	70828 Info	
House "De Rode Leeuw" ^{(nl)}			Bree	Hoogstraat 10	51.14079°N 5.59824°E	70828 Info	
house ^{(nl)} ^{(fr)}			Bree	Hoogstraat 12	51.14090°N 5.59839°E	70829 Info	
house ^{(nl)} ^{(fr)}			Bree	Hoogstraat 13	51.14165°N 5.59908°E	70830 Info	
House "Princenhof" ^{(nl)}			Bree	Hoogstraat 20	51.14080°N 5.59887°E	70831 Info	
Two large houses ^{(nl)} ^{(fr)}			Bree	Hoogstraat 22	51.14080°N 5.59887°E	70832 Info	
house ^{(nl)} ^{(fr)}			Bree	Hoogstraat 32	51.14153°N 5.59957°E	70833 Info	
Farmstead "Philpkenshof" ^{(nl)}			Bree	Houterstraat 21	51.15260°N 5.64029°E	70834 Info	
"Kaaihoeve" ^{(nl)}			Bree	Kanaalkaai 1	51.14439°N 5.61573°E	70835 Info	
Former office ^{(nl)} ^{(fr)}			Bree	Kanaalkaai 5	51.14388°N 5.61679°E	70836 Info	
house ^{(nl)} ^{(fr)}			Bree	Kanaalkom 4	51.14703°N 5.61174°E	70837 Info	
house ^{(nl)} ^{(fr)}			Bree	Kanaallaan 1	51.14341°N 5.60404°E	70838 Info	
house ^{(nl)} ^{(fr)}			Bree	Kanaallaan 3	51.14373°N 5.60404°E	70839 Info	
Terraced houses from the '30s ^{(nl)} ^{(fr)}			Bree	Kanaallaan 19	51.14418°N 5.60577°E	70840 Info	
Terraced houses from the '30s ^{(nl)} ^{(fr)}			Bree	Kanaallaan 21	51.14418°N 5.60577°E	70840 Info	
Terraced houses from the '30s ^{(nl)} ^{(fr)}			Bree	Kanaallaan 23	51.14418°N 5.60577°E	70840 Info	
house ^{(nl)} ^{(fr)}			Bree	Kanaallaan 20	51.14379°N 5.60627°E	70841 Info	
house ^{(nl)} ^{(fr)}			Bree	Kanaallaan 25	51.14432°N 5.60579°E	70842 Info	
house ^{(nl)} ^{(fr)}			Bree	Kanaallaan 25A	51.14432°N 5.60579°E	70842 Info	
Villa ^{(nl)} ^{(fr)}			Bree	Kanaallaan 27	51.14435°N 5.60629°E	70843 Info	
Farm "Klein Stukkenhof" ^{(nl)}			Bree	Klein Stukkenstraat 2	51.12613°N 5.59999°E	70844 Info	
Broad House late XIX ^{(nl)} ^{(fr)}			Bree	Kloosterstraat 8	51.14056°N 5.59700°E	70845 Info	
Former Hospital of the Holy Cross ^{(nl)} ^{(fr)}			Bree	Kloosterstraat 11	51.14023°N 5.59752°E	70846 Info	
Former Hospital of the Holy Cross ^{(nl)} ^{(fr)}			Bree	Kloosterstraat 13	51.14023°N 5.59752°E	70846 Info	
house ^{(nl)} ^{(fr)}			Bree	Kloosterstraat 12	51.14033°N 5.59687°E	70847 Info	
Former city farm ^{(nl)} ^{(fr)}			Bree	Kloosterstraat 14	51.14040°N 5.59656°E	70848 Info	
house ^{(nl)} ^{(fr)}			Bree	Witte Torenwal 2	51.14217°N 5.60096°E	70849 Info	
State Police Barracks ^{(nl)} ^{(fr)}			Bree	Malta 7	51.14234°N 5.60167°E	70850 Info	
Mansion ^{(nl)} ^{(fr)}			Bree	Malta 9	51.14248°N 5.60183°E	70851 Info	
Villa "Zonnewende" ^{(nl)}			Bree	Malta 20	51.14215°N 5.60291°E	70852 Info	
Broad House in Art Deco style ^{(nl)} ^{(fr)}			Bree	Malta 25	51.14321°N 5.60310°E	70853 Info	
Hall (former) ^{(nl)} ^{(fr)}			Bree	Markt 2	51.14115°N 5.59737°E	70854 Info	
"Michielshuis" ^{(nl)}			Bree	Markt 8	51.14150°N 5.59676°E	70855 Info	
Mansion ^{(nl)} ^{(fr)}			Bree	Markt 13	51.14104°N 5.59668°E	70856 Info	
L-shaped building Xixa ^{(nl)} ^{(fr)}			Bree	Markt 23	51.14129°N 5.59624°E	70857 Info	
house ^{(nl)} ^{(fr)}			Bree	Meinestraat 14	51.14194°N 5.59870°E	70858 Info	
Two large houses from XIX ^{(nl)} ^{(fr)}			Bree	Nieuwstadpoort 9	51.14009°N 5.59489°E	70859 Info	
Two large houses from XIX ^{(nl)} ^{(fr)}			Bree	Nieuwstadpoort 11	51.14009°N 5.59489°E	70859 Info	
Mansion ^{(nl)} ^{(fr)}			Bree	Nieuwstadstraat 12	51.14117°N 5.59519°E	70860 Info	
house ^{(nl)} ^{(fr)}			Bree	Hoogstraat 32	51.14153°N 5.59957°E	70861 Info	
Former home "the Eysere hant" ^{(nl)} ^{(fr)}			Bree	Opitterstraat 7	51.14130°N 5.59991°E	70862 Info	
house ^{(nl)} ^{(fr)}			Bree	Opitterstraat 24	51.14048°N 5.60000°E	70863 Info	
house ^{(nl)} ^{(fr)}			Bree	Opitterstraat 28	51.14042°N 5.60026°E	70864 Info	
house ^{(nl)} ^{(fr)}			Bree	Opitterstraat 32	51.14046°N 5.60060°E	70865 Info	
St Job Chapel ^{(nl)} ^{(fr)}			Bree	Oudestraat	51.13876°N 5.59839°E	70866 Info	
Chapel of Our Lady of Montfort ^{(nl)} ^{(fr)}			Bree	Panhovenstraat	51.13376°N 5.61618°E	70867 Info	
Parish Church St. Lutgardis ^{(nl)} ^{(fr)}			Bree	't Hasseltkiezel	51.14247°N 5.64751°E	70868 Info	
Vogeldonskhof ^{(nl)} ^{(fr)}			Bree	't Hasseltkiezel 33	51.14338°N 5.68151°E	70869 Info	
Former refugiehuis of the Abbey of Postel ^{(nl)} ^{(fr)}	Yes		Bree	Grauwe Torenwal 3	51.14005°N 5.59784°E	70870 Info	
Deanery ^{(nl)} ^{(fr)}			Bree	Vaesstraat 2	51.14029°N 5.59900°E	70871 Info	
Two identical houses wide ^{(nl)} ^{(fr)}			Bree	Vaesstraat 3	51.14069°N 5.59918°E	70872 Info	
Former kapelanij ^{(nl)} ^{(fr)}			Bree	Vaesstraat 4	51.14037°N 5.59946°E	70873 Info	
Farmstead "Patersburgerhof" ^{(nl)} ^{(fr)}			Bree	Veldstraat 2	51.13829°N 5.64588°E	70874 Info	
Memorial to the casualties of W.O. I ^{(nl)} ^{(fr)}			Bree	Vrijthof	51.14132°N 5.59776°E	70875 Info	
Two civilian houses XIXd ^{(nl)} ^{(fr)}			Bree	Vrijthof 3	51.14154°N 5.59808°E	70876 Info	
Two civilian houses XIXd ^{(nl)} ^{(fr)}			Bree	Vrijthof 4	51.14154°N 5.59808°E	70876 Info	
Two houses from the late XIX ^{(nl)} ^{(fr)}			Bree	Vrijthof 5	51.14158°N 5.59803°E	70877 Info	
Two houses from the late XIX ^{(nl)} ^{(fr)}			Bree	Vrijthof 6	51.14158°N 5.59803°E	70877 Info	
Burger House ^{(nl)} ^{(fr)}			Bree	Vrijthof 9	51.14178°N 5.59772°E	70878 Info	
Augustinian Monastery and Chapel (former) ^{(nl)} ^{(fr)}	Yes		Bree	Vrijthof 10	51.14194°N 5.59732°E	70879 Info	
Diephuis from the 1920 ^{(nl)} ^{(fr)}			Bree	Witte Torenstraat 10	51.14363°N 5.59980°E	70880 Info	
Parish Church of Our Lady in Gerdingen ^{(nl)} ^{(fr)}	Yes		Bree	Barrierstraat 6	51.14760°N 5.58833°E	71027 Info	
Former farm ^{(nl)} ^{(fr)}			Bree	Barrierstraat 3	51.14728°N 5.58882°E	71028 Info	
Former farm ^{(nl)} ^{(fr)}			Bree	Barrierstraat 5	51.14728°N 5.58882°E	71028 Info	
Village house from XIXd ^{(nl)} ^{(fr)}			Bree	Barrierstraat 28	51.14680°N 5.58547°E	71029 Info	
Village house from the late XIX ^{(nl)} ^{(fr)}			Bree	Barrierstraat 47	51.14465°N 5.58113°E	71030 Info	
Cast Iron Cross ^{(nl)} ^{(fr)}			Bree	Heuvelstraat	51.13277°N 5.56869°E	71031 Info	
Farmstead "Cluysemanshof" ^{(nl)} ^{(fr)}			Bree	Kluisstraat 5	51.12981°N 5.58488°E	71032 Info	
Gerkenberg Monastery ^{(nl)}			Bree	Meeuwerkiezel 88	51.13189°N 5.58004°E	71033 Info	
Our Lady Chapel ^{(nl)}			Bree	Pannenbakkersstraat	51.14543°N 5.58207°E	71034 Info	
Former farm ^{(nl)} ^{(fr)}			Bree	Schoolstraat 81	51.14710°N 5.58705°E	71035 Info	
St. John's Chapel ^{(nl)} ^{(fr)}			Bree	Thijsstraat	51.14914°N 5.58677°E	71036 Info	
Two have ^{(nl)} ^{(fr)}			Bree	Thijsstraat 16	51.14884°N 5.58764°E	71037 Info	
Two have ^{(nl)} ^{(fr)}			Bree	Thijsstraat 18	51.14884°N 5.58764°E	71037 Info	
Truyenshof typical Kempen farm ^{(nl)}			Bree	Truyenhofstraat 1	51.13992°N 5.57795°E	71038 Info	
Saint Anthony's Chapel ^{(nl)}			Bree	Maaseikerbaan	51.11477°N 5.65890°E	71040 Info	
Farmstead "Veltmanshof" ^{(nl)}			Bree	Maaseikerbaan 1	51.11691°N 5.64839°E	71041 Info	
Pollismolen ^{(nl)}	Yes		Bree	Molenstraat 48	51.11561°N 5.63482°E	71042 Info	
Slagmolen ^{(nl)}			Bree	Molenstraat 52	51.11510°N 5.63780°E	71043 Info	
Farm ^{(nl)} ^{(fr)}			Bree	Opstraat 10	51.11617°N 5.64461°E	71044 Info	
Vinck Mill ^{(nl)}			Bree	Opstraat 14	51.11586°N 5.64413°E	71045 Info	
Rectory ^{(nl)} ^{(fr)}	Yes		Bree	Pater Neyenslaan 2	51.11822°N 5.64619°E	71046 Info	
Former guard bridge house ^{(nl)} ^{(fr)}			Bree	Ziepstraat 44	51.11581°N 5.66797°E	71047 Info	
Chapel of Our Lady of the Sacred Heart ^{(nl)} ^{(fr)}			Bree	Bosstraat	51.13459°N 5.66921°E	71048 Info	
St. Peter's Parish ^{(nl)} ^{(fr)}	Yes		Bree	Dorpstraat	51.12672°N 5.66001°E	71049 Info	
Two village houses ^{(nl)} ^{(fr)}			Bree	Dorpstraat 18	51.12696°N 5.66087°E	71050 Info	
Two village houses ^{(nl)} ^{(fr)}			Bree	Dorpstraat 20	51.12696°N 5.66087°E	71050 Info	
Village house ^{(nl)} ^{(fr)}			Bree	Dorpstraat 22	51.12700°N 5.66108°E	71051 Info	
Village house from 1886 ^{(nl)} ^{(fr)}			Bree	Dorpstraat 23	51.12745°N 5.66062°E	71052 Info	
Former farm ^{(nl)} ^{(fr)}			Bree	Dorpstraat 24	51.12668°N 5.66125°E	71053 Info	
Village house from 1854 ^{(nl)} ^{(fr)}			Bree	Dorpstraat 25	51.12771°N 5.66050°E	71054 Info	
Small elongated farm ^{(nl)} ^{(fr)}			Bree	Dorpstraat 27	51.12776°N 5.66084°E	71055 Info	
Former farm of 1865 ^{(nl)} ^{(fr)}			Bree	Dorpstraat 30	51.12723°N 5.66201°E	71056 Info	
Former farm of 1885 ^{(nl)} ^{(fr)}			Bree	Dorpstraat 29	51.12783°N 5.66103°E	71057 Info	
Former school teacher's house and home section ^{(nl)} ^{(fr)}			Bree	Dorpstraat 33	51.12783°N 5.66154°E	71058 Info	
Farm ^{(nl)} ^{(fr)}			Bree	Dorpstraat 40	51.12809°N 5.66330°E	71059 Info	
"Koudhuis" ^{(nl)}			Bree	Kerkhofstraat 7	51.12707°N 5.65847°E	71060 Info	
Keyartmolen ^{(nl)}	Yes		Bree	Keyartstraat 4	51.12348°N 5.65660°E	71061 Info	
Semi-closed farm ^{(nl)} ^{(fr)}			Bree	Keyartstraat 29	51.12649°N 5.65857°E	71062 Info	
Former elongated farm ^{(nl)} ^{(fr)}			Bree	Keyartstraat 30	51.12552°N 5.65912°E	71063 Info	
Closed farm ^{(nl)} ^{(fr)}			Bree	Keyartstraat 32	51.12630°N 5.65931°E	71064 Info	
Village house ^{(nl)} ^{(fr)}			Bree	Solterweg 2	51.12643°N 5.66014°E	71066 Info	
Former farmhouse XIXc ^{(nl)} ^{(fr)}			Bree	Solterweg 4	51.12642°N 5.66034°E	71067 Info	
Mill Village ^{(nl)} ^{(fr)}	Yes		Bree	Solterweg 16	51.12535°N 5.66130°E	71068 Info	
Harvester Mill ^{(nl)} ^{(fr)}			Bree	Opstraat 98	51.11181°N 5.63021°E	72437 Info	
elongated farm "Stukkenheidehof" ^{(nl)}			Bree	Grensstraat 1	51.13227°N 5.61923°E	86033 Info	
Wrought iron cross ^{(nl)} ^{(fr)}			Bree	Nijsenbergstraat	51.11590°N 5.60963°E	86034 Info	
Farmstead "Straeterhof" ^{(nl)}			Bree	Straterhofweg 1	51.14048°N 5.64500°E	86035 Info	
Farm "Kluitshof" later "Groot Kluitshof" ^{(nl)}			Bree	Kluitshofweg 4	51.12799°N 5.57932°E	86036 Info	
Wrought iron cross ^{(nl)} ^{(fr)}			Bree	Meeuwerkiezel	51.12660°N 5.56839°E	86037 Info	
Cross ^{(nl)}			Bree	Muizendijkstraat	51.11090°N 5.57759°E	86038 Info	
Memorial to the casualties of W.O. I ^{(nl)} ^{(fr)}			Bree	Siemenstraat	51.14387°N 5.58973°E	86039 Info	
farm "Stukkenheidehof" ^{(nl)}			Bree	Grensstraat 2	51.13366°N 5.62431°E	86040 Info	
Chapel of Our Lady Comforter of the Afflicted ^{(nl)} ^{(fr)}	Yes		Bree	Opitterkiezel 200	51.12093°N 5.63807°E	86041 Info	
Convent and School ^{(nl)} ^{(fr)}			Bree	Opitterkiezel 211	51.11935°N 5.64274°E	86042 Info	
Farm with old establishment ^{(nl)} ^{(fr)}			Bree	Rorenweg 16	51.12954°N 5.63544°E	86043 Info	
Farm with old establishment ^{(nl)} ^{(fr)}			Bree	Rorenweg 24	51.12625°N 5.64089°E	86044 Info	
Parish Church St. Trudo ^{(nl)} ^{(fr)}	Yes		Bree	Itterplein 1	51.11759°N 5.64625°E	88644 Info	
Restored village house ^{(nl)} ^{(fr)}	Yes		Bree	Itterplein 1	51.11759°N 5.64625°E	88645 Info	
Single eclectic mansion ^{(nl)} ^{(fr)}			Bree	Itterplein 20	51.11677°N 5.64593°E	88646 Info	
Brewery St. Joseph ^{(nl)} ^{(fr)}			Bree	Itterplein 24	51.11694°N 5.64693°E	88647 Info	
Former section house ^{(nl)} ^{(fr)}			Bree	Itterplein 26	51.11669°N 5.64725°E	88648 Info	
Wrought iron cross ^{(nl)} ^{(fr)}			Bree	Rorenweg	51.12268°N 5.64065°E	88649 Info	

== See also ==
- List of onroerend erfgoed in Limburg (Belgium)
- Bree, Belgium
