= List of protected heritage sites in Colfontaine =

This table shows an overview of the protected heritage sites in the Walloon town Colfontaine. This list is part of Belgium's national heritage.

Object	Year/architect	Town/section	Address	Coordinates	Number^{?}	Image
House "La Court" ^{(nl)} ^{(fr)}		Colfontaine	Wasmes	50.416858°N 3.838837°E	53082-CLT-0002-01 Info	Huis "La Court"
Notre Dame ^{(nl)} ^{(fr)}		Colfontaine		50.421712°N 3.845254°E	53082-CLT-0003-02 Info	Kerk Notre-Dame
House (Maison du Peuple "): facade and roof ^{(nl)} ^{(fr)}		Colfontaine	rue du Peuple, n° 1	50.408249°N 3.862360°E	53082-CLT-0005-01 Info	Huis ('Maison du Peuple'): gevel en dak More images
Some parts of the coal mining museum and the old "les Wagnaux" ^{(nl)} ^{(fr)}		Colfontaine	rue du pont d'Arcole:	50.424091°N 3.840793°E	53082-CLT-0006-01 Info	
The walls, arches outside and inside the interior, the trim and the roof of the house Fenelon, also called "Belle Maison" ^{(nl)} ^{(fr)}		Colfontaine	rue Libiez, n°s 2 A en 2 B, te Pâturages	50.394941°N 3.862410°E	53082-CLT-0007-01 Info	
Establishment of a buffer zone around the architectural complex comprising the Grand Hornu Workers’ Estate in Boussu, including the “château” (manager’s house), the cobbled streets and the squares, with a view to preserving the surrounding area. (+ BOUSSU/Hornu and QUAREGNON/Wasmuel)		Wasmes	Rue de la Grande Campagne	50.433035°N 3.841472°E	53082-CLT-0008-01 Info	

== See also ==
- List of protected heritage sites in Hainaut (province)
- Colfontaine
