= List of protected heritage sites in Bilzen =

This table shows an overview of the protected heritage sites in the Flemish town Bilzen. This list is part of Belgium's national heritage.

| Object | Status^{?} | Year/architect | Town/section | Address | Coordinates | Number^{?} | Image |
|---|---|---|---|---|---|---|---|
| Closed farm ^{(nl)} ^{(fr)} | | | Bilzen | Merem 24 | 50.86474°N 5.50009°E | 525 Info | |
| Farm ^{(nl)} ^{(fr)} | | | Bilzen | Merem 26 | 50.86434°N 5.50009°E | 526 Info | |
| Closed farm ^{(nl)} ^{(fr)} | | | Bilzen | Merem 29 | 50.86431°N 5.49897°E | 527 Info | |
| Closed farm ^{(nl)} ^{(fr)} | | | Bilzen | Merem 33 | 50.86399°N 5.49896°E | 528 Info | |
| Beguine House ^{(nl)} ^{(fr)} | Yes | | Bilzen | Begijnhof 6 | 50.87020°N 5.51951°E | 529 Info | |
| Farm Klein Bibelen ^{(nl)} ^{(fr)} | | | Bilzen | Klein-Bivelenweg 1 | 50.87079°N 5.49078°E | 530 Info | |
| Farm Boschwinning ^{(nl)} ^{(fr)} | | | Bilzen | Boswinningstraat 3 | 50.89745°N 5.49011°E | 531 Info | |
| Watermill Broekemmolen ^{(nl)} ^{(fr)} | | | Bilzen | Broekem 49 | 50.88257°N 5.51716°E | 532 Info | |
| Mansion ^{(nl)} ^{(fr)} | Yes | | Bilzen | Brugstraat 2 | 50.86956°N 5.51811°E | 533 Info | |
| Eclectic mansion ^{(nl)} ^{(fr)} | | | Bilzen | Brugstraat 8 | 50.86910°N 5.51796°E | 534 Info | |
| Town house ^{(nl)} ^{(fr)} | | | Bilzen | Brugstraat 17 | 50.86922°N 5.51727°E | 535 Info | |
| Two town houses ^{(nl)} ^{(fr)} | | | Bilzen | Brugstraat 23 | 50.86893°N 5.51735°E | 536 Info | |
| Two town houses ^{(nl)} ^{(fr)} | | | Bilzen | Brugstraat 25 | 50.86893°N 5.51735°E | 536 Info | |
| City Farm ^{(nl)} ^{(fr)} | | | Bilzen | Brugstraat 30 | 50.86842°N 5.51829°E | 537 Info | |
| Mansion ^{(nl)} ^{(fr)} | | | Bilzen | Brugstraat 49 | 50.86784°N 5.51807°E | 538 Info | |
| Platform ^{(nl)} ^{(fr)} | | | Bilzen | Markt | 50.87022°N 5.51721°E | 539 Info | |
| Chapel, now garden arbor ^{(nl)} ^{(fr)} | Yes | | Bilzen | Demerlaan | 50.86927°N 5.51666°E | 540 Info | |
| Burger House ^{(nl)} ^{(fr)} | | | Bilzen | Genutstraat 32 | 50.87174°N 5.51429°E | 541 Info | |
| Eclectic mansion ^{(nl)} ^{(fr)} | | | Bilzen | Genutstraat 34 | 50.87192°N 5.51435°E | 542 Info | |
| Our Lady Chapel ^{(nl)} ^{(fr)} | | | Bilzen | Haakstraat | 50.86621°N 5.49807°E | 543 Info | |
| Chapel outside the gate Nutspoort ^{(nl)} ^{(fr)} | | | Bilzen | Hasseltsestraat | 50.87387°N 5.50836°E | 544 Info | |
| St. Joseph Parish ^{(nl)} ^{(fr)} | | | Bilzen | Eik | | 545 Info | |
| Chapel ^{(nl)} ^{(fr)} | | | Bilzen | Heesveld | 50.89733°N 5.49866°E | 546 Info | |
| Hospital ^{(nl)} ^{(fr)} | Yes | | Bilzen | Hospitaalstraat 15 | 50.87146°N 5.51268°E | 550 Info | |
| Eclectic mansion ^{(nl)} ^{(fr)} | Yes | | Bilzen | Klokkestraat 19 | 50.87153°N 5.51738°E | 551 Info | |
| Deanery ^{(nl)} ^{(fr)} | Yes | | Bilzen | Kloosterstraat 7 | 50.87108°N 5.51866°E | 553 Info | |
| Convent and school of the Holy Sepulchre ^{(nl)} ^{(fr)} | | | Bilzen | Kloosterstraat 9 | 50.87078°N 5.52034°E | 554 Info | |
| Eclectic shop ^{(nl)} ^{(fr)} | | | Bilzen | Korenstraat 5 | 50.87077°N 5.51462°E | 555 Info | |
| Burger House of 1908 ^{(nl)} ^{(fr)} | | | Bilzen | Korenstraat 17 | 50.87052°N 5.51417°E | 556 Info | |
| Farmhouse with separate components ^{(nl)} ^{(fr)} | | | Bilzen | Leten 25 | 50.85603°N 5.51428°E | 557 Info | |
| Parish St. Mauritius ^{(nl)} ^{(fr)} | Yes | | Bilzen | Markt | 50.87057°N 5.51769°E | 558 Info | |
| Town hall ^{(nl)} ^{(fr)} | Yes | | Bilzen | Markt 1 | 50.87037°N 5.51728°E | 559 Info | |
| Burger House ^{(nl)} ^{(fr)} | | | Bilzen | Markt 4 | 50.87060°N 5.51661°E | 560 Info | |
| Burger House ^{(nl)} ^{(fr)} | | | Bilzen | Markt 6 | 50.87060°N 5.51661°E | 560 Info | |
| Corner house ^{(nl)} ^{(fr)} | | | Bilzen | Markt 35 | 50.87020°N 5.51783°E | 562 Info | |
| Corner house ^{(nl)} ^{(fr)} | | | Bilzen | Markt 37 | 50.87020°N 5.51783°E | 562 Info | |
| Watermill Meershoventmolen ^{(nl)} ^{(fr)} | | | Bilzen | Meershoven 2 | 50.87331°N 5.52199°E | 563 Info | |
| Sacred Heart Parish ^{(nl)} ^{(fr)} | | | Bilzen | Pater Damiaanstraat 23 | 50.86851°N 5.49967°E | 564 Info | |
| Farmhouse with separate components ^{(nl)} ^{(fr)} | | | Bilzen | Merem 4 | 50.86649°N 5.50183°E | 565 Info | |
| City Farm ^{(nl)} ^{(fr)} | | | Bilzen | Omstraat 2 | 50.87183°N 5.51548°E | 566 Info | |
| Watermill Renfortmolen ^{(nl)} ^{(fr)} | Yes | | Bilzen | Rentfortstraat 6 | 50.89250°N 5.49762°E | 568 Info | |
| Waste timber having ^{(nl)} ^{(fr)} | | | Bilzen | Spurk 36 | 50.88818°N 5.50095°E | 570 Info | |
| Waste timber having ^{(nl)} ^{(fr)} | | | Bilzen | Spurk 42 | 50.88818°N 5.50095°E | 570 Info | |
| Bilzen train station ^{(nl)} ^{(fr)} | | | Bilzen | Stationlaan | 50.86850°N 5.50951°E | 571 Info | More images |
| Mansion ^{(nl)} ^{(fr)} | | | Bilzen | Stationlaan 26 | 50.86927°N 5.51228°E | 572 Info | |
| Eclectic mansion ^{(nl)} ^{(fr)} | | | Bilzen | Stationlaan 29 | 50.87000°N 5.51192°E | 573 Info | |
| Eclectic mansion ^{(nl)} ^{(fr)} | | | Bilzen | Stationlaan 31 | 50.86967°N 5.51205°E | 574 Info | |
| Burger House ^{(nl)} ^{(fr)} | | | Bilzen | Stationlaan 36 | 50.86867°N 5.51167°E | 575 Info | |
| Row eclectic town houses ^{(nl)} ^{(fr)} | | | Bilzen | Stationlaan 39 | 50.86918°N 5.51090°E | 576 Info | |
| Row eclectic town houses ^{(nl)} ^{(fr)} | | | Bilzen | Stationlaan 41 | 50.86918°N 5.51090°E | 576 Info | |
| Row eclectic town houses ^{(nl)} ^{(fr)} | | | Bilzen | Stationlaan 43 | 50.86918°N 5.51090°E | 576 Info | |
| Row eclectic town houses ^{(nl)} ^{(fr)} | | | Bilzen | Stationlaan 45 | 50.86918°N 5.51090°E | 576 Info | |
| Three identical town houses ^{(nl)} ^{(fr)} | | | Bilzen | Stationlaan 47 | 50.86902°N 5.51064°E | 577 Info | |
| Three identical town houses ^{(nl)} ^{(fr)} | | | Bilzen | Stationlaan 49 | 50.86902°N 5.51064°E | 577 Info | |
| Three identical town houses ^{(nl)} ^{(fr)} | | | Bilzen | Stationlaan 51 | 50.86902°N 5.51064°E | 577 Info | |
| Eclectic house on the corner ^{(nl)} ^{(fr)} | | | Bilzen | Stationlaan 53 | 50.86883°N 5.51040°E | 578 Info | |
| Burger House ^{(nl)} ^{(fr)} | | | Bilzen | Stationlaan 57 | 50.86874°N 5.51007°E | 579 Info | |
| elongated farm ^{(nl)} ^{(fr)} | | | Bilzen | Appelveldstraat 29 | 50.90379°N 5.46880°E | 580 Info | |
| Residential farm ^{(nl)} ^{(fr)} | | | Bilzen | Appelveldstraat 48 | 50.90375°N 5.46969°E | 581 Info | |
| Former elongated farm ^{(nl)} ^{(fr)} | Yes | | Bilzen | Appelveldstraat 54 | 50.90444°N 5.46802°E | 582 Info | |
| Farmhouse with separate components ^{(nl)} ^{(fr)} | Yes | | Bilzen | Begeveldstraat 53 | 50.90830°N 5.46063°E | 587 Info | |
| Farmhouse with separate components ^{(nl)} ^{(fr)} | Yes | | Bilzen | Begeveldstraat 61 | 50.90856°N 5.45938°E | 588 Info | |
| St. Gertrude Parish ^{(nl)} ^{(fr)} | | | Bilzen | Beverststraat | 50.89168°N 5.47419°E | 589 Info | |
| Rectory ^{(nl)} ^{(fr)} | Yes | | Bilzen | Beverststraat 4 | 50.89081°N 5.47402°E | 590 Info | |
| Closed farm ^{(nl)} ^{(fr)} | | | Bilzen | Beverststraat 20 | 50.89191°N 5.47256°E | 591 Info | |
| Farmhouse, now two dwellings ^{(nl)} ^{(fr)} | | | Bilzen | Beverststraat 62 | 50.89322°N 5.46991°E | 592 Info | |
| Farmhouse, now two dwellings ^{(nl)} ^{(fr)} | | | Bilzen | Beverststraat 64 | 50.89322°N 5.46991°E | 592 Info | |
| Semi-closed farm ^{(nl)} ^{(fr)} | | | Bilzen | Beverststraat 76 | 50.89356°N 5.46860°E | 593 Info | |
| Semi-closed farm ^{(nl)} ^{(fr)} | | | Bilzen | Beverststraat 78 | 50.89356°N 5.46860°E | 593 Info | |
| Closed farm ^{(nl)} ^{(fr)} | | | Bilzen | Blindestraat 42 | 50.89027°N 5.48423°E | 594 Info | |
| Farm Damershof ^{(nl)} ^{(fr)} | | | Bilzen | Damerstraat 1 | 50.88293°N 5.46152°E | 595 Info | |
| Closed farm ^{(nl)} ^{(fr)} | | | Bilzen | Damerstraat 3 | 50.88671°N 5.45042°E | 596 Info | |
| elongated farm ^{(nl)} ^{(fr)} | | | Bilzen | Grotstraat 22 | 50.90419°N 5.48266°E | 597 Info | |
| Former elongated farm ^{(nl)} ^{(fr)} | | | Bilzen | Grotstraat 46 | 50.90478°N 5.47867°E | 598 Info | |
| Our Lady Chapel ^{(nl)} ^{(fr)} | | | Bilzen | Holt | 50.88673°N 5.48166°E | 599 Info | |
| Closed farm ^{(nl)} ^{(fr)} | | | Bilzen | Holt 50 | 50.88541°N 5.48364°E | 601 Info | |
| Closed farm ^{(nl)} ^{(fr)} | | | Bilzen | Holt 54 | 50.88541°N 5.48237°E | 602 Info | |
| Burger House ^{(nl)} ^{(fr)} | | | Bilzen | Holt 104 | 50.88878°N 5.47811°E | 603 Info | |
| Farmstead "Asbornehof" ^{(nl)} ^{(fr)} | | | Bilzen | Holt 106 | 50.88882°N 5.47781°E | 604 Info | |
| Forge (former) ^{(nl)} ^{(fr)} | | | Bilzen | Holt 134 | 50.88981°N 5.47547°E | 605 Info | |
| Farm of 1857 ^{(nl)} ^{(fr)} | | | Bilzen | Kleistraat 11 | 50.88911°N 5.47501°E | 606 Info | |
| Closed farm of 1869 ^{(nl)} ^{(fr)} | | | Bilzen | Laarstraat 6 | 50.88727°N 5.48311°E | 607 Info | |
| Closed farm of 1887 ^{(nl)} ^{(fr)} | | | Bilzen | Laarstraat 14 | 50.88778°N 5.48364°E | 608 Info | |
| Watermill of 1862 ^{(nl)} ^{(fr)} | | | Bilzen | Molenstraat 18 | 50.89956°N 5.46547°E | 609 Info | |
| Farm Winning van de Koetsier ^{(nl)} ^{(fr)} | | | Bilzen | Oudestraat 24 | 50.89633°N 5.46545°E | 611 Info | |
| Chapel of 1883 ^{(nl)} ^{(fr)} | | | Bilzen | Pannenovenstraat | 50.88633°N 5.47846°E | 612 Info | |
| Our Lady Chapel of 1927 ^{(nl)} ^{(fr)} | | | Bilzen | Pruinveld | 50.89813°N 5.45635°E | 613 Info | |
| Farmhouse with separate components ^{(nl)} ^{(fr)} | | | Bilzen | Tipstraat 82 | 50.89667°N 5.45870°E | 616 Info | |
| Cemetery ^{(nl)} ^{(fr)} | Yes | | Bilzen | Zonhoevestraat | 50.89054°N 5.47300°E | 617 Info | |
| Farm De Zon ^{(nl)} ^{(fr)} | Yes | | Bilzen | Kleistraat 1 | 50.88982°N 5.47434°E | 618 Info | |
| Farm De Zon ^{(nl)} ^{(fr)} | Yes | | Bilzen | Zonhoevestraat 1 | 50.88982°N 5.47434°E | 618 Info | |
| Closed farm ^{(nl)} ^{(fr)} | | | Bilzen | Schoonbeekstraat 54 | 50.90135°N 5.47148°E | 619 Info | |
| Farmhouse with separate components ^{(nl)} ^{(fr)} | | | Bilzen | St-Lodewijkstraat 12 | 50.90250°N 5.48173°E | 620 Info | |
| elongated farm ^{(nl)} ^{(fr)} | | | Bilzen | St-Lodewijkstraat 66 | 50.90368°N 5.48909°E | 621 Info | |
| Water castle Schoonbeek ^{(nl)} ^{(fr)} | Yes | | Bilzen | Waterkasteelstraat 1 | 50.90004°N 5.47858°E | 623 Info | More images |
| Chapel of 1849 ^{(nl)} ^{(fr)} | | | Bilzen | Waterkasteelstraat | 50.90085°N 5.47880°E | 624 Info | |

== See also ==
- List of onroerend erfgoed in Limburg (Belgium)
- Bilzen
