= List of protected heritage sites in Kelmis =

This table shows an overview of the protected heritage sites in the Walloon town Kelmis. This list is part of Belgium's national heritage.

Object	Year/architect	Town/section	Address	Coordinates	Number	Image
Emmaburg or Eyneburg ^{(nl)} ^{(de)}		Kelmis		50.705355°N 6.015762°E	31254 Info	Emmaburg or Eyneburg
Lontzenerbachtal ^{(nl)} ^{(de)}		Kelmis		50.695622°N 5.992558°E	31056 Info	Lontzenerbachtal
Hirtz house ^{(nl)} ^{(de)}		Kelmis		50.704431°N 5.986754°E	31256 Info	Hirtz house
house ^{(nl)} ^{(de)}		Kelmis	Bauweg 75	50.722016°N 6.005337°E	31257 Info	house
St. Rochus Chapel and surrounding area ^{(nl)} ^{(de)}		Kelmis		50.706891°N 6.002416°E	31424 Info	St. Rochus Chapel and surrounding area
Casino pond ^{(nl)} ^{(de)}		Kelmis		50.710157°N 6.011066°E	32236 Info	Casino pond
Häuser Penning ^{(nl)} ^{(de)}		Kelmis	Lütticher Strasse 241-243	50.712701°N 6.011342°E	31426 Info	Häuser Penning
Former board building of the Société anonyme des Mines and Fonderies the Zinc de la Vieille Montagne (the façades, roof and stairs) ^{(nl)} ^{(de)}		Kelmis	Lütticher Strasse 280	50.711483°N 6.008545°E	40373 Info	Former board building of the Société anonyme des Mines and Fonderies the Zinc de la Vieille Montagne (the façades, roof and stairs)
Evangelical church including rectory and cemetery ^{(nl)} ^{(de)}		Neu-Moresnet Kelmis	Hasardstrasse	50.71277°N 6.012639°E	31425 Info	Evangelical church including rectory and cemetery

== See also ==
- Lists of protected heritage sites in the German-speaking Community of Belgium
- List of protected heritage sites in Liège (province)
- Kelmis
