= List of protected heritage sites in Brunehaut =

This table shows an overview of the protected heritage sites in the Walloon town Brunehaut. This list is part of Belgium's national heritage.

| Object | Year/architect | Town/section | Address | Coordinates | Number^{?} | Image |
|---|---|---|---|---|---|---|
| Château de Lannoy in Hollain ^{(nl)} ^{(fr)} | | Brunehaut | | 50.551709°N 3.422369°E | 57093-CLT-0001-01 Info | |
| Menhir Pierre Brunehault in Hollain ^{(nl)} ^{(fr)} | | Brunehaut | | 50.526024°N 3.415815°E | 57093-CLT-0002-01 Info | Menhir Pierre Brunehault te Hollain |
| Transept parish in Jollain-Merlin ^{(nl)} ^{(fr)} | | Brunehaut | | 50.539287°N 3.404228°E | 57093-CLT-0003-01 Info | |
| 15th-century choir of the church of Sainte-Marie-Madeleine Howardries ^{(nl)} ^{(fr)} | | Brunehaut | | 50.505801°N 3.356319°E | 57093-CLT-0004-01 Info | |
| Choir of the Church of Rongy, the high altar and reredos, the two side altars and the altar, communion rail, pulpit, paneling, and confessionals in the transept, and stalls placed on both sides in the front ^{(nl)} ^{(fr)} | | Brunehaut | | 50.506831°N 3.386083°E | 57093-CLT-0006-01 Info | Koor van de Kerk van Rongy, het hoogaltaar en retabel, de twee zijaltaren en het altaar, de communiebank, de preekstoel, lambrisering, en biechtstoelen in het transept, en kraampjes geplaatst aan beide zijden van het front |
| Castle ('Saint-Aybert') in Bléharies ^{(nl)} ^{(fr)} | | Brunehaut | | 50.512550°N 3.415446°E | 57093-CLT-0007-01 Info | Kerk ('Saint-Aybert') te Bléharies |

== See also ==
- List of protected heritage sites in Hainaut (province)
- Brunehaut
