= List of protected heritage sites in Nivelles =

This table shows an overview of the protected heritage sites in the Walloon town Nijvel, or Nivelles. This list is part of Belgium's national heritage.

Object	Year/architect	Town/section	Address	Coordinates	Number^{?}	Image
Chapel of Récollets ^{(nl)} ^{(fr)}		Nijvel		50.596238°N 4.327793°E	25072-CLT-0001-01 Info	Kapel van Recollets
Park Dodaine ^{(nl)} ^{(fr)}		Nijvel		50.591474°N 4.320543°E	25072-CLT-0003-01 Info	Park van Dodaine
Cloister of the former convent of Saint Gertrude ^{(nl)} ^{(fr)}		Nijvel		50.597721°N 4.323523°E	25072-CLT-0004-01 Info	Kloostergang van het voormalige klooster van Sainte Gertrude
Cellars of the Collegiate Church of Sainte-Gertrude ^{(nl)} ^{(fr)}		Nijvel		50.597894°N 4.323386°E	25072-CLT-0005-01 Info	
Collegiate Church of Saint Gertrude ^{(nl)} ^{(fr)}		Nijvel		50.597440°N 4.323700°E	25072-CLT-0006-01 Info	Collegiale Kerk van Sainte Gertrude
town hall ^{(nl)} ^{(fr)}		Nijvel		50.597820°N 4.322820°E	25072-CLT-0007-01 Info	
Fontaine-Perron ^{(nl)} ^{(fr)}		Nijvel		50.596937°N 4.323013°E	25072-CLT-0008-01 Info	
tower Simone ^{(nl)} ^{(fr)}		Nijvel		50.596732°N 4.319676°E	25072-CLT-0009-01 Info	Toren Simone
Building "La Tourette" ^{(nl)} ^{(fr)}		Nijvel		50.592670°N 4.318794°E	25072-CLT-0010-01 Info	Gebouw "La Tourette"
building ^{(nl)} ^{(fr)}		Nijvel	rue de Bruxelles 29	50.599477°N 4.324407°E	25072-CLT-0011-01 Info	
Renard tower ^{(nl)} ^{(fr)}		Nijvel		50.592460°N 4.332932°E	25072-CLT-0012-01 Info	
Old farm of Quertaimont ^{(nl)} ^{(fr)}		Nijvel		50.603035°N 4.331847°E	25072-CLT-0013-01 Info	Oude pachthoeve van Quertaimont
Domain Fonteneau ^{(nl)} ^{(fr)}		Nijvel		50.609250°N 4.332579°E	25072-CLT-0015-01 Info	
Domain of Potte ^{(nl)} ^{(fr)}		Nijvel		50.612206°N 4.333964°E	25072-CLT-0016-01 Info	
Forest of Sépulcre ^{(nl)} ^{(fr)}		Nijvel		50.612478°N 4.306235°E	25072-CLT-0017-01 Info	
Facades, roof, cladding and staircases of the building ^{(nl)} ^{(fr)}		Nijvel	rue des Saintes n° 16	50.595751°N 4.326214°E	25072-CLT-0018-01 Info	
Facades and roofs of the building n° 98 located near Charleroi ^{(nl)} ^{(fr)}		Nijvel	n° 98	50.590290°N 4.329650°E	25072-CLT-0019-01 Info	
Property and construction ^{(nl)} ^{(fr)}		Nijvel	rue de la religion n° 10	50.595374°N 4.326708°E	25072-CLT-0021-01 Info	Huis en aanbouw
Church of Sainte-Marguerite, with the exception of the small shrine on the right side of the building, and the group formed by the church, the cemetery, the rectory and the garden and the road along the wall of the farm ^{(nl)} ^{(fr)}		Nijvel		50.597771°N 4.368336°E	25072-CLT-0022-01 Info	Kerk Sainte-Marguerite, met uitzondering van het kleine heiligdom aan de rechterkant van het gebouw, en de groep gevormd door de kerk, de begraafplaats, de pastorie en de tuin en de weg langs de muur van de boerderij More images
Church of Saint Francis ^{(nl)} ^{(fr)}		Nijvel		50.601670°N 4.274927°E	25072-CLT-0023-01 Info	Kerk Saint François More images
Facades and roofs of the main building and the pavilion ^{(nl)} ^{(fr)}		Nijvel	rue de Soignies n° 15	50.597030°N 4.320718°E	25072-CLT-0024-01 Info	
Presbytery: facades and roofs ^{(nl)} ^{(fr)}		Nijvel	rue du Centre n° 40	50.601483°N 4.274618°E	25072-CLT-0025-01 Info	Pastorie: gevels en daken
Farm of Seigneur: facades and roofs of the old 17th century entrance, the facade, roof and gable of the south wing of the old outbuildings ^{(nl)} ^{(fr)}		Nijvel		50.600321°N 4.272022°E	25072-CLT-0026-01 Info	Boerderij van Seigneur: gevels en daken van de oude ingang van de 17e eeuw, en de buitengevel, daken en puntgevel van de zuidelijke vleugel van de oude bijgebouwen
The organ and choir screen, surrounding walls and ceiling of the first span of the church Saint-Remy ^{(nl)} ^{(fr)}		Nijvel		50.613017°N 4.351780°E	25072-CLT-0027-01 Info	Het orgel en het oksaal, aangrenzende muren en het plafond van de eerste travee van de kerk Saint-Remy
Forest of Hôpital ^{(nl)} ^{(fr)}		Nijvel		50.592154°N 4.263528°E	25072-CLT-0031-01 Info	
Forest of Arpes ^{(nl)} ^{(fr)}		Nijvel		50.577098°N 4.279806°E	25072-CLT-0032-01 Info	
Ensemble of Collegiate Church of Sainte Gertrude, with the exception of the front part of the furnishings (except the pulpit) and organ (instrumental part and buffet) ^{(nl)} ^{(fr)}		Nijvel		50.597440°N 4.323700°E	25072-PEX-0001-01 Info	Ensemble van Collegiale Kerk van Sainte Gertrude, met uitzondering van de voorste deel van het meubilair (met uitzondering van de preekstoel) en orgel (instrumentaal deel en buffet)

== See also ==
- Lists of protected heritage sites in Walloon Brabant
- Nivelles
