= List of protected heritage sites in Beauvechain =

This table shows an overview of the protected heritage sites in the Walloon town Beauvechain. This list is part of Belgium's national heritage.

Object	Year/architect	Town/section	Address	Coordinates	Number^{?}	Image
St. Martin's church ^{(nl)} ^{(fr)}		Deurne		50.778298°N 4.747014°E	25005-CLT-0001-01 Info	Kerk Saint-Martin
Part of Meerdaalwoud (woods) ^{(nl)} ^{(fr)}				50.793646°N 4.681099°E	25005-CLT-0002-01 Info	
Wahenges farmhouse ^{(nl)} ^{(fr)}		Sluizen		50.765363°N 4.809134°E	25005-CLT-0003-01 Info	Boerderij Wahenges: de gevels en daken van alle gebouwen van de boerderij Wahenges en de bestrating van de binnenplaats, de structuur van de schuur, de structuur en het kader van de presentatie, de gewelven en de structuur van het hoofdgebouw, de kerk en zijn altaar gehecht aan het huis en het behang op de muren van de tweede kamer aan de rechterkant van de ingang van het hoofdgebouw
Rond Chêne chapel and surroundings ^{(nl)} ^{(fr)}		Deurne		50.795634°N 4.754479°E	25005-CLT-0004-01 Info	Kapel du Rond Chêne en gebied daar omheen
Nicaise woods ^{(nl)} ^{(fr)}		Hamme-Mille		50.782085°N 4.702825°E	25005-CLT-0005-01 Info	
Chapel of St. Cornelis ^{(nl)} ^{(fr)}		Hamme-Mille		50.788473°N 4.737444°E	25005-CLT-0006-01 Info	
Chapel of St. Martin ^{(nl)} ^{(fr)}				50.778298°N 4.747014°E	25005-PEX-0001-01 Info	Kerk Saint-Martin
Wahenges farm ^{(nl)} ^{(fr)}		Sluizen		50.756485°N 4.801426°E	25005-PEX-0002-01 Info	Boerderij Wahenges: de gevels en daken van alle gebouwen van de boerderij Wahenges en de bestrating van de binnenplaats, de structuur van de schuur, de structuur en het kader van de presentatie, de gewelven en de structuur van het hoofdgebouw, de kerk en zijn altaar gehecht aan het huis en het behang op de muren van de tweede kamer aan de rechterkant van de ingang van het hoofdgebouw en het ensemble gevormd door de Wahenges boerderij, vijver en kreek Broekbeek Schoor, de verharde paden die leiden naar de boerderij, de lijn van populieren, de Leckbosch met de locatie van de twee graven en de Gallo-Romeinse villa, weiden en bossen

== See also ==
- Lists of protected heritage sites in Walloon Brabant
- Beauvechain
