= Lists of protected heritage sites in Belgium =

This are lists of protected heritage sites in Belgium by province and the German-speaking Community.

== German-speaking Community ==
- List of protected heritage sites in Amel
- List of protected heritage sites in Burg-Reuland
- List of protected heritage sites in Büllingen
- List of protected heritage sites in Bütgenbach
- List of protected heritage sites in Eupen
- List of protected heritage sites in Kelmis
- List of protected heritage sites in Lontzen
- List of protected heritage sites in Raeren
- List of protected heritage sites in Sankt-Vith

== Hainaut ==
- List of protected heritage sites, in Aiseau-Presles
- List of protected heritage sites, in Antoing
- List of protected heritage sites, in Ath
- List of protected heritage sites, in Beaumont, Belgium
- List of protected heritage sites, in Belœil
- List of protected heritage sites, in Bernissart
- List of protected heritage sites, in Binche
- List of protected heritage sites, in Boussu
- List of protected heritage sites, in Braine-le-Comte
- List of protected heritage sites, in Brugelette
- List of protected heritage sites, in Brunehaut
- List of protected heritage sites, in Celles, Hainaut
- List of protected heritage sites, in Charleroi
- List of protected heritage sites, in Châtelet, Belgium
- List of protected heritage sites, in Chièvres
- List of protected heritage sites, in Chimay
- List of protected heritage sites, in Colfontaine
- List of protected heritage sites, in Courcelles, Belgium
- List of protected heritage sites, in Dour
- List of protected heritage sites, in Écaussinnes
- List of protected heritage sites, in Ellezelles
- List of protected heritage sites, in Enghien
- List of protected heritage sites, in Erquelinnes
- List of protected heritage sites, in Estaimpuis
- List of protected heritage sites, in Estinnes
- List of protected heritage sites, in Flobecq
- List of protected heritage sites, in Fontaine-l'Evêque
- List of protected heritage sites, in Frameries
- List of protected heritage sites, in Frasnes-lez-Anvaing
- List of protected heritage sites, in Froidchapelle
- List of protected heritage sites, in Gerpinnes
- List of protected heritage sites, in Ham-sur-Heure-Nalinnes
- List of protected heritage sites, in Honnelles
- List of protected heritage sites, in Jurbise
- List of protected heritage sites, in La Louvière
- List of protected heritage sites, in Le Rœulx
- List of protected heritage sites, in Les Bons Villers
- List of protected heritage sites, in Lessines
- List of protected heritage sites, in Leuze-en-Hainaut
- List of protected heritage sites, in Lobbes
- List of protected heritage sites, in Manage
- List of protected heritage sites, in Momignies
- List of protected heritage sites, in Mons
- List of protected heritage sites, in Morlanwelz
- List of protected heritage sites, in Mouscron
- List of protected heritage sites, in Pecq, Belgium
- List of protected heritage sites, in Péruwelz
- List of protected heritage sites, in Pont-à-Celles
- List of protected heritage sites, in Quaregnon
- List of protected heritage sites, in Quévy
- List of protected heritage sites, in Saint-Ghislain
- List of protected heritage sites, in Seneffe
- List of protected heritage sites, in Silly, Belgium
- List of protected heritage sites, in Sivry-Rance
- List of protected heritage sites, in Soignies
- List of protected heritage sites, in Thuin
- List of protected heritage sites, in Tournai

== Liège ==
- List of protected heritage sites, in Amay
- List of protected heritage sites, in Amel
- List of protected heritage sites, in Ans
- List of protected heritage sites, in Anthisnes
- List of protected heritage sites, in Aubel
- List of protected heritage sites, in Awans
- List of protected heritage sites, in Aywaille
- List of protected heritage sites, in Baelen
- List of protected heritage sites, in Bassenge
- List of protected heritage sites, in Blegny
- List of protected heritage sites, in Waremme
- List of protected heritage sites, in Braives
- List of protected heritage sites, in Burdinne
- List of protected heritage sites, in Burg-Reuland
- List of protected heritage sites, in Büllingen
- List of protected heritage sites, in Bütgenbach
- List of protected heritage sites, in Chaudfontaine
- List of protected heritage sites, in Clavier, Liège
- List of protected heritage sites, in Comblain-au-Pont
- List of protected heritage sites, in Crisnée
- List of protected heritage sites, in Dalhem
- List of protected heritage sites, in Donceel
- List of protected heritage sites, in Engis
- List of protected heritage sites, in Esneux
- List of protected heritage sites, in Eupen
- List of protected heritage sites, in Faimes
- List of protected heritage sites, in Ferrières
- List of protected heritage sites, in Fexhe-le-Haut-Clocher
- List of protected heritage sites, in Flémalle
- List of protected heritage sites, in Fléron
- List of protected heritage sites, in Geer
- List of protected heritage sites, in Grâce-Hollogne
- List of protected heritage sites, in Hamoir
- List of protected heritage sites, in Hannut
- List of protected heritage sites, in Herstal
- List of protected heritage sites, in Herve
- List of protected heritage sites, in Huy
- List of protected heritage sites, in Jalhay
- List of protected heritage sites, in Juprelle
- List of protected heritage sites, in Kelmis
- List of protected heritage sites, in Lierneux
- List of protected heritage sites, in Lincent
- List of protected heritage sites, in Limbourg
- List of protected heritage sites, in Lontzen
- List of protected heritage sites, in Liège
- List of protected heritage sites, in Malmedy
- List of protected heritage sites, in Marchin
- List of protected heritage sites, in Modave
- List of protected heritage sites, in Nandrin
- List of protected heritage sites, in Neupré
- List of protected heritage sites, in Oreye
- List of protected heritage sites, in Olne
- List of protected heritage sites, in Ouffet
- List of protected heritage sites, in Oupeye
- List of protected heritage sites, in Pepinster
- List of protected heritage sites, in Plombières
- List of protected heritage sites, in Raeren
- List of protected heritage sites, in Remicourt
- List of protected heritage sites, in Saint-Georges-sur-Meuse
- List of protected heritage sites, in Saint-Nicolas
- List of protected heritage sites, in Sankt-Vith
- List of protected heritage sites, in Seraing
- List of protected heritage sites, in Soumagne
- List of protected heritage sites, in Spa
- List of protected heritage sites, in Sprimont
- List of protected heritage sites, in Stavelot
- List of protected heritage sites, in Stoumont
- List of protected heritage sites, in Theux
- List of protected heritage sites, in Thimister-Clermont
- List of protected heritage sites, in Tinlot
- List of protected heritage sites, in Trois-Ponts
- List of protected heritage sites, in Trooz
- List of protected heritage sites, in Verlaine
- List of protected heritage sites, in Verviers
- List of protected heritage sites, in Villers-le-Bouillet
- List of protected heritage sites, in Wanze
- List of protected heritage sites, in Wasseiges
- List of protected heritage sites, in Waimes
- List of protected heritage sites, in Welkenraedt
- List of protected heritage sites, in Visé

== Limburg ==
- List of protected heritage sites in Alken, Belgium
- List of protected heritage sites in As, Belgium
- List of protected heritage sites in Beringen, Belgium
- List of protected heritage sites in Bilzen
- List of protected heritage sites in Bocholt, Belgium
- List of protected heritage sites in Borgloon
  - List of protected heritage sites in Borgloon (part 1)
  - List of protected heritage sites in Borgloon (part 2)
- List of protected heritage sites in Bree, Belgium
- List of protected heritage sites in Diepenbeek
- List of protected heritage sites in Dilsen-Stokkem
  - List of protected heritage sites in Dilsen-Stokkem (part 1)
  - List of protected heritage sites in Dilsen-Stokkem (part 2)
- List of protected heritage sites in Genk
- List of protected heritage sites in Gingelom
- List of protected heritage sites in Halen
- List of protected heritage sites in Ham, Belgium
- List of protected heritage sites in Hamont-Achel
- List of protected heritage sites in Hasselt
  - List of immovable heritage sites in Hasselt (part 1)
  - List of immovable heritage sites in Hasselt (part 2)
  - List of immovable heritage sites in Hasselt (part 3)
  - List of immovable heritage sites in Hasselt (part 4)

== Luxembourg ==
- List of protected heritage sites, in Arlon
- List of protected heritage sites, in Attert
- List of protected heritage sites, in Aubange
- List of protected heritage sites, in Bastogne
- List of protected heritage sites, in Bertogne
- List of protected heritage sites, in Bertrix
- List of protected heritage sites, in Bouillon
- List of protected heritage sites, in Chiny
- List of protected heritage sites, in Durbuy
- List of protected heritage sites, in Érezée
- List of protected heritage sites, in Étalle, Belgium
- List of protected heritage sites, in Florenville
- List of protected heritage sites, in Gouvy
- List of protected heritage sites, in Habay
- List of protected heritage sites, in Herbeumont
- List of protected heritage sites, in Hotton
- List of protected heritage sites, in Houffalize
- List of protected heritage sites, in La Roche-en-Ardenne
- List of protected heritage sites, in Léglise
- List of protected heritage sites, in Libin
- List of protected heritage sites, in Libramont-Chevigny
- List of protected heritage sites, in Manhay
- List of protected heritage sites, in Marche-en-Famenne
- List of protected heritage sites, in Martelange
- List of protected heritage sites, in Meix-devant-Virton
- List of protected heritage sites, in Messancy
- List of protected heritage sites, in Nassogne
- List of protected heritage sites, in Neufchâteau, Belgium
- List of protected heritage sites, in Paliseul
- List of protected heritage sites, in Rouvroy, Belgium
- List of protected heritage sites, in Saint-Hubert, Belgium
- List of protected heritage sites, in Tellin
- List of protected heritage sites, in Tintigny
- List of protected heritage sites, in Vaux-sur-Sûre
- List of protected heritage sites, in Vielsalm
- List of protected heritage sites, in Virton

== Namur ==
- List of protected heritage sites, in Andenne
- List of protected heritage sites, in Anhée
- List of protected heritage sites, in Assesse
- List of protected heritage sites, in Beauraing
- List of protected heritage sites, in Bièvre
- List of protected heritage sites, in Cerfontaine, Belgium
- List of protected heritage sites, in Ciney
- List of protected heritage sites, in Couvin
- List of protected heritage sites, in Dinant
- List of protected heritage sites, in Doische
- List of protected heritage sites, in Éghezée
- List of protected heritage sites, in Fernelmont
- List of protected heritage sites, in Floreffe
- List of protected heritage sites, in Florennes
- List of protected heritage sites, in Fosses-la-Ville
- List of protected heritage sites, in Gedinne
- List of protected heritage sites, in Gembloux
- List of protected heritage sites, in Gesves
- List of protected heritage sites, in Hamois
- List of protected heritage sites, in Hastière
- List of protected heritage sites, in Havelange
- List of protected heritage sites, in Houyet
- List of protected heritage sites, in Jemeppe-sur-Sambre
- List of protected heritage sites, in La Bruyère, Belgium
- List of protected heritage sites, in Mettet
- List of protected heritage sites, in Namur (city)
- List of protected heritage sites, in Ohey
- List of protected heritage sites, in Onhaye
- List of protected heritage sites, in Philippeville
- List of protected heritage sites, in Profondeville
- List of protected heritage sites, in Rochefort, Belgium
- List of protected heritage sites, in Sambreville
- List of protected heritage sites, in Sombreffe
- List of protected heritage sites, in Somme-Leuze
- List of protected heritage sites, in Viroinval
- List of protected heritage sites, in Vresse-sur-Semois
- List of protected heritage sites, in Walcourt
- List of protected heritage sites, in Yvoir

== Walloon Brabant ==
- List of protected heritage sites, in Beauvechain
- List of protected heritage sites, in Braine-l'Alleud
- List of protected heritage sites, in Braine-le-Château
- List of protected heritage sites, in Chastre
- List of protected heritage sites, in Chaumont-Gistoux
- List of protected heritage sites, in Court-Saint-Étienne
- List of protected heritage sites, in Genappe
- List of protected heritage sites, in Grez-Doiceau
- List of protected heritage sites, in Hélécine
- List of protected heritage sites, in Incourt, Belgium
- List of protected heritage sites, in Ittre
- List of protected heritage sites, in Jodoigne
- List of protected heritage sites, in La Hulpe
- List of protected heritage sites, in Lasne
- List of protected heritage sites, in Nivelles
- List of protected heritage sites, in Orp-Jauche
- List of protected heritage sites, in Ottignies-Louvain-la-Neuve
- List of protected heritage sites, in Perwez
- List of protected heritage sites, in Ramillies, Belgium
- List of protected heritage sites, in Rebecq
- List of protected heritage sites, in Rixensart
- List of protected heritage sites, in Tubize
- List of protected heritage sites, in Villers-la-Ville
- List of protected heritage sites, in Walhain
- List of protected heritage sites, in Waterloo, Belgium
- List of protected heritage sites, in Wavre
