= List of protected heritage sites in Celles, Hainaut =

This table shows an overview of the protected heritage sites in the Walloon town Celles, Hainaut. This list is part of Belgium's national heritage.

Object	Year/architect	Town/section	Address	Coordinates	Number^{?}	Image
The church of Saint-Christophe ^{(nl)} ^{(fr)}		Celles		50.712019°N 3.457087°E	57018-CLT-0001-01 Info	De kerk van Saint-Christophe
Pillory in Moyart ^{(nl)} ^{(fr)}		Celles		50.722289°N 3.452481°E	57018-CLT-0002-01 Info	
The church of Saint-Martin ^{(nl)} ^{(fr)}		Celles		50.756010°N 3.447828°E	57018-CLT-0003-01 Info	De kerk van Saint-Martin
The tower of the church of Saint-Antoine l'Ermite ^{(nl)} ^{(fr)}		Celles		50.732754°N 3.404786°E	57018-CLT-0005-01 Info	De toren van de kerk van Saint-Antoine l'Ermite More images
Castle farm (facades and roofs, stairs from the main building and beamed ceilings of the rooms on the first floor, staircase to the left) (M) and the building and the environment (S) ^{(nl)} ^{(fr)}		Celles	Place, n°3	50.731891°N 3.403037°E	57018-CLT-0006-01 Info	Kasteel-boerderij (gevels en daken, trappen van het hoofdgebouw en balkenplafonds van de kamers op de eerste verdieping, trap links) (M) en het gebouw en de omgeving (S) More images

== See also ==
- List of protected heritage sites in Hainaut (province)
- Celles, Hainaut
