= List of protected heritage sites in Braine-le-Château =

This table shows an overview of the protected heritage sites in the Walloon town Braine-le-Château. This list is part of Belgium's national heritage.

Object	Year/architect	Town/section	Address	Coordinates	Number^{?}	Image
Bailiff's house except outbuildings ^{(nl)} ^{(fr)}		Braine-le-Château	Grand-Place, n°20	50.682173°N 4.266177°E	25015-CLT-0002-01 Info	Baljuwhuis, uitgezonderd bijgebouwen
Castle of the Counts of Hornes (Robiano) ^{(nl)} ^{(fr)}		Braine-le-Château		50.683452°N 4.266608°E	25015-CLT-0004-01 Info	Kasteel van de graven van Hornes (Robiano)
Area around castle cemetery wall, classified as a monument by Royal Decree of 17 March 1949, including the wall of the road rue des Comtes the Robiano, and the wall of the cemetery ^{(nl)} ^{(fr)}		Braine-le-Château		50.683290°N 4.265276°E	25015-CLT-0005-01 Info	
Pilori ^{(nl)} ^{(fr)}	1521	Braine-le-Château	Grand Place	50.681836°N 4.266535°E	25015-CLT-0006-01 Info	Schandpaal
Banal mill with its wheel, enclave in the park of the castle of the Counts of Hornes ^{(nl)} ^{(fr)}		Braine-le-Château	Rue des Comtes de Robiano 4	50.683771°N 4.264747°E	25015-CLT-0007-01 Info	Seigneuriale molen met zijn rad, enclave in het park van het kasteel van de graven van Hornes
Chapel of Notre-Dame au Bois and environment ^{(nl)} ^{(fr)}	1740	Braine-le-Château		50.673307°N 4.264328°E	25015-CLT-0009-01 Info	
Portico of the entrance of the cemetery and the adjacent wall of the cemetery and the property of "Comte Cornet de Ways Ruart" ^{(nl)} ^{(fr)}		Braine-le-Château		50.682466°N 4.266757°E	25015-CLT-0010-01 Info	
Chapel of Sainte-Croix and its environment ^{(nl)} ^{(fr)}		Braine-le-Château		50.687742°N 4.262730°E	25015-CLT-0011-01 Info	
Farmhouse Rose of Binchefort (facades and roofs) and its surroundings ^{(nl)} ^{(fr)}		Braine-le-Château		50.682014°N 4.258355°E	25015-CLT-0012-01 Info	Boerderij Rose of Binchefort (gevels en daken) en diens omgeving
Medieval site southwest of the place called "Les Monts" ^{(nl)} ^{(fr)}		Braine-le-Château		50.686050°N 4.259049°E	25015-CLT-0013-01 Info	
Rectory (facades and roofs), church, cemetery and square ^{(nl)} ^{(fr)}		Wauthier-Braine Braine-le-Château		50.680614°N 4.299065°E	25015-CLT-0014-01 Info	
Forest Haumont, except for the two open spots around the house built on lot 75 b and the other in plots 4 r 5 and 4 s 5 ^{(nl)} ^{(fr)}		Braine-le-Château		50.679091°N 4.314161°E	25015-CLT-0015-01 Info	

== See also ==
- Lists of protected heritage sites in Walloon Brabant
- Braine-le-Château
