= List of protected heritage sites in Halen =

This table shows an overview of the protected heritage sites in the Flemish town Halen. This list is part of Belgium's national heritage.

| Object | Status^{?} | Year/architect | Town/section | Address | Coordinates | Number^{?} | Image |
|---|---|---|---|---|---|---|---|
| "Hoeve Vogel-sanck" farm ^{(nl)} | | | Halen | Betserbaan 72 | 50.95409°N 5.09268°E | 21744 Info | |
| farm ^{(nl)} | | | Halen | Betserbaan 76 | 50.95296°N 5.09369°E | 21745 Info | |
| farm ^{(nl)} | | | Halen | Ertsenrijkstraat 107 | 50.92907°N 5.12451°E | 21748 Info | |
| Closed farm 1852 ^{(nl)} | Yes | | Halen | Ertsenrijkstraat 115 | 50.92547°N 5.12416°E | 21749 Info | |
| lock ^{(nl)} | | | Halen | Firmin Jacobslaan | 50.94803°N 5.11688°E | 21750 Info | |
| broad House ^{(nl)} | | | Halen | Generaal de Wittestraat 3 | 50.94830°N 5.11328°E | 21752 Info | |
| double House ^{(nl)} | | | Halen | Generaal de Wittestraat 5 | 50.94838°N 5.11302°E | 21753 Info | |
| double House ^{(nl)} | Yes | | Halen | Generaal de Wittestraat 10 | 50.94799°N 5.11262°E | 21755 Info | |
| double House ^{(nl)} | Yes | | Halen | Generaal de Wittestraat 12 | 50.94799°N 5.11262°E | 21755 Info | |
| double House ^{(nl)} | | | Halen | Generaal de Wittestraat 14 | 50.94799°N 5.11239°E | 21756 Info | |
| double House ^{(nl)} | | | Halen | Generaal de Wittestraat 21 | 50.94831°N 5.11210°E | 21757 Info | |
| double House ^{(nl)} | | | Halen | Koepoortstraat 5 | 50.94893°N 5.11479°E | 21760 Info | |
| Iron Mining farm ^{(nl)} | | | Halen | Ijzerwinningstraat 2 | 50.94228°N 5.08834°E | 21761 Info | |
| Parish St. Peter-in-Banden ^{(nl)} | Yes | | Halen | Markt | 50.94862°N 5.11466°E | 21764 Info | |
| double House ^{(nl)} | Yes | | Halen | Markt 9 | 50.94796°N 5.11357°E | 21765 Info | |
| only House ^{(nl)} | Yes | | Halen | Markt 11 | 50.94757°N 5.11367°E | 21766 Info | |
| two homes ^{(nl)} | | | Halen | Marktstraat 4 | 50.94718°N 5.11520°E | 21771 Info | |
| Farmer Burger House 1824 ^{(nl)} | Yes | | Halen | Nederstraat 1 | 50.94812°N 5.11516°E | 21772 Info | |
| two homes ^{(nl)} | | | Halen | Staatsbaan 106 | 50.95977°N 5.08641°E | 21774 Info | |
| two homes ^{(nl)} | | | Halen | Staatsbaan 108 | 50.95977°N 5.08641°E | 21774 Info | |
| broad House ^{(nl)} | Yes | | Halen | Zepbrugstraat 34 | 50.94039°N 5.10543°E | 21778 Info | |
| Jeneverdistillery, housing ^{(nl)} | | | Halen | Zwarte Duivelsstraat 20 | 50.94860°N 5.11933°E | 21779 Info | |
| Watermill on the Gete, now home ^{(nl)} | | | Halen | Zwarte Duivelsstraat 35 | 50.94809°N 5.11959°E | 21781 Info | |
| 1912 Chapel St. Donatus ^{(nl)} | | | Halen | Lindestraat | 50.92823°N 5.06356°E | 21782 Info | |
| Blekkom Castle, 1859 ^{(nl)} | | | Halen | Lindestraat 124 | 50.92314°N 5.07567°E | 21783 Info | |
| St. Andrew Parish ^{(nl)} | | | Halen | Loksbergenstraat | 50.93484°N 5.07054°E | 21784 Info | |
| Village house double house type ^{(nl)} | | | Halen | Loksbergenstraat 43 | 50.93380°N 5.06818°E | 21785 Info | |
| Presbytery, classic double house ^{(nl)} | | | Halen | Loksbergenstraat 25 | 50.93498°N 5.07096°E | 21786 Info | |
| village house ^{(nl)} | | | Halen | Loksbergenstraat 54 | 50.93318°N 5.06846°E | 21787 Info | |
| Farmer Burger House, double house 1878 ^{(nl)} | | | Halen | Loksbergenstraat 90 | 50.93215°N 5.06568°E | 21789 Info | |
| Semi-closed farm ^{(nl)} | | | Halen | Oude Leuvensebaan 3 | 50.93408°N 5.05119°E | 21790 Info | |
| Vault Reynrode and chapel ^{(nl)} | | | Halen | Oude Leuvensebaan 2 | 50.93437°N 5.05059°E | 21791 Info | |
| farm ^{(nl)} | | | Halen | Oude Leuvensebaan 13 | 50.93481°N 5.05430°E | 21792 Info | |
| Rotemse mill ^{(nl)} | Yes | | Halen | Gidsenstraat 24 | 50.92884°N 5.09219°E | 21794 Info | |
| Abbey Mariendal, also called "Abbey Rothem" ^{(nl)} | Yes | | Halen | Rotemstraat 4 | 50.92845°N 5.09759°E | 21795 Info | |
| Farm standalone components ^{(nl)} | Yes | | Halen | Rotemstraat 14 | 50.92721°N 5.09265°E | 21797 Info | |
| St Pancras Parish Church ^{(nl)} | | | Halen | Kerkstraat | 50.96081°N 5.09049°E | 21798 Info | |
| Presbytery classical double house ^{(nl)} | | | Halen | Kerkstraat 10 | 50.96055°N 5.09095°E | 21799 Info | |
| Zelker watermill ^{(nl)} | | | Halen | Zelemstraat 7 | 50.96113°N 5.09015°E | 21801 Info | |
| Parish Church Saint-Lambert ^{(nl)} | Yes | | Halen | Dorpsstraat 36 | 50.97968°N 5.10423°E | 21803 Info | |
| "Hoeve Eksterhoek" semi closed farm ^{(nl)} | | | Halen | Eksterhoekstraat 1 | 50.97113°N 5.08687°E | 21804 Info | |
| "Geesthuis" double-wide house ^{(nl)} | Yes | | Halen | Gennepstraat 22 | 50.98375°N 5.08426°E | 21805 Info | |
| Men's double house Property Type ^{(nl)} | | | Halen | Kolenbergstraat 26 | 50.97616°N 5.09817°E | 21809 Info | |
| Loboshoeve castle farm ^{(nl)} | | | Halen | Lobosstraat 2 | 50.98333°N 5.10800°E | 21810 Info | |
| farm ^{(nl)} | | | Halen | Schomstraat | 50.97249°N 5.09499°E | 21811 Info | |
| Carthusian Monastery St. Jansdal ^{(nl)} | Yes | | Halen | Sint-Jansbergstraat 7-8-9 | 50.96961°N 5.09143°E | 21812 Info | |
| Our Lady Chapel ^{(nl)} | | | Halen | Steenbergstraat | 50.97465°N 5.11085°E | 21813 Info | |
| "Hoeve Oude Pastorij" U-shaped farm ^{(nl)} | | | Halen | Steenbergstraat 20 | 50.97276°N 5.09896°E | 21814 Info | |
| "Hoeve Oude Pastorij" U-shaped farm ^{(nl)} | | | Halen | Steenbergstraat 22 | 50.97276°N 5.09896°E | 21814 Info | |
| rectory ^{(nl)} | | | Halen | Dorpsstraat 34 | 50.97987°N 5.10325°E | 88629 Info | |
| school section ^{(nl)} | | | Halen | Dorpsstraat 39 | 50.97905°N 5.10436°E | 88630 Info | |
| Pan Factory "De Panoven" ^{(nl)} | Yes | | Halen | Panovenstraat 45 | 50.93124°N 5.07110°E | 200349 Info | |
| Belgian military cemetery ^{(nl)} | Yes | | Halen | Liniestraat | 50.93702°N 5.09905°E | 200660 Info | |

== See also ==
- List of onroerend erfgoed in Limburg (Belgium)
- Halen
