= List of protected heritage sites in Waremme =

This table shows an overview of the protected heritage sites in the Walloon town Waremme. This list is part of Belgium's national heritage.

Object	Year/architect	Town/section	Address	Coordinates	Number^{?}	Image
Tumulus of Borgworm ^{(nl)} ^{(fr)}		Waremme		50.688158°N 5.257525°E	64074-CLT-0001-01 Info	Tumulus van Borgworm, het ensemble van de tumulus met diens omgeving
Longchamps road ^{(nl)} ^{(fr)}		Waremme		50.689243°N 5.240516°E	64074-CLT-0002-01 Info	
Tumulus of the Bois des Tombes ^{(nl)} ^{(fr)}		Waremme		50.679064°N 5.240791°E	64074-CLT-0003-01 Info	Tumuli van het Bois des Tombes, het ensemble van twee tumuli en hun omgeving
Tumulus of Oleye ^{(nl)} ^{(fr)}		Waremme		50.715838°N 5.282120°E	64074-CLT-0004-01 Info	Tumulus van Oleye en zijn omgeving
Church of Saint-Denis of Grand-Axhe ^{(nl)} ^{(fr)}		Waremme		50.679136°N 5.224115°E	64074-CLT-0005-01 Info	Interieur, meubels en ramen van de l'église Saint-Denis te Grand-Axhe
Old house including elm tree ^{(nl)} ^{(fr)}		Waremme	porte de Liège n°8	50.697665°N 5.257381°E	64074-CLT-0006-01 Info	
Archeological site of Tumulus of Borgworm ^{(nl)} ^{(fr)}		Waremme		50.688158°N 5.257525°E	64074-PEX-0001-01 Info	Tumulus van Borgworm, de archeologische site
Archeological site of the Tumulus of Bois des Tombes ^{(nl)} ^{(fr)}		Waremme		50.679064°N 5.240791°E	64074-PEX-0002-01 Info	Tumuli van het Bois des Tombes, de archeologische site met twee tumuli
Archeological site of the Tumulus of Oleye ^{(nl)} ^{(fr)}		Waremme		50.715838°N 5.282120°E	64074-PEX-0003-01 Info	Tumulus van Oleye, de archeologische site

== See also ==
- List of protected heritage sites in Liège (province)
- Waremme
