= List of protected heritage sites in Büllingen =

This table shows an overview of the protected heritage sites in the Walloon town Büllingen. This list is part of Belgium's national heritage.

Object	Year/architect	Town/section	Address	Coordinates	Number	Image
Old parts of the church of St. Eligius ^{(nl)} ^{(de)}		Büllingen	Krewinkel	50.407701°N 6.257744°E	31010 Info	Old parts of the church of St. Eligius
St. Cornelis chapel ^{(nl)} ^{(de)}		Büllingen		50.350740°N 6.294533°E	31011 Info	St. Cornelis chapel
Roman wall ^{(nl)} ^{(de)}		Büllingen		50.358865°N 6.291197°E	31012 Info	Roman wall
St. Eligius chapel ^{(nl)} ^{(de)}		Büllingen		50.330461°N 6.382796°E	30999 Info	St. Eligius chapel
St. Lambert church ^{(nl)} ^{(de)}		Büllingen	Manderfeld	50.330170°N 6.340654°E	31000 Info	St. Lambert church
14 Stations of the Cross ^{(nl)} ^{(de)}		Büllingen	Manderfeld	50.330170°N 6.340654°E	31013 Info	14 Stations of the Cross
Stations of the Cross "Kreuz auf der Flins" ^{(nl)} ^{(de)}		Büllingen	Medendorf	50.335860°N 6.283564°E	31014 Info	Stations of the Cross "Kreuz auf der Flins"
St. Brictius chapel ^{(nl)} ^{(de)}		Büllingen		50.349696°N 6.352392°E	31015 Info	St. Brictius chapel
Border marker Julich ^{(nl)} ^{(de)}		Büllingen	Julich	50.478394°N 6.308585°E	31031 Info	
Church of St. Anna ^{(nl)} ^{(de)}		Büllingen	Friedhof	50.426982°N 6.263717°E	31029 Info	Church of St. Anna
Sieben Fußfälle ^{(nl)} ^{(de)}		Büllingen	Bullingen road	50.408472°N 6.259293°E	31028 Info	Sieben Fußfälle

== See also ==
- Lists of protected heritage sites in the German-speaking Community of Belgium
- List of protected heritage sites in Liège (province)
- Büllingen
