= List of protected heritage sites in Châtelet, Belgium =

This table shows an overview of the protected heritage sites in the Walloon town Châtelet. This list is part of Belgium's national heritage.

Object	Year/architect	Town/section	Address	Coordinates	Number^{?}	Image
Chapel of Saint-Roch ^{(nl)} ^{(fr)}		Châtelet		50.400155°N 4.530362°E	52012-CLT-0001-01 Info	Kapel Saint-Roch
House facade and roof ^{(nl)} ^{(fr)}		Châtelet	place E. Wilson n° 13	50.415226°N 4.518566°E	52012-CLT-0004-01 Info	Huis: gevel en dak
Portions of Pirmez castle: the roof, walls, window frames (chassis and component), with the exception of the chapel from the 19th century, and all architectural and decorative elements of the rotunda which constitutes an ensemble ^{(nl)} ^{(fr)}		Châtelet	Grand-Rue n°s 3-5	50.403380°N 4.526935°E	52012-CLT-0005-01 Info	Gedeeltes van kasteel Pirmez: het dak, gevels, kozijnen (chassis en component), met uitzondering van de kapel uit de 19e eeuw, en alle architecturale en decoratieve onderdelen van het ronde gebouw (koepel?), en vormt een ensemble

== See also ==
- List of protected heritage sites in Hainaut (province)
- Châtelet, Belgium
