= List of protected heritage sites in Amel =

This table shows an overview of the protected heritage sites in the Walloon town Amel. This list is part of Belgium's national heritage.

Object	Year/architect	Town/section	Address	Coordinates	Number	Image
Market cross ^{(nl)} ^{(de)}		Amel		50.354589°N 6.170028°E	31004 Info	Market cross
St. Hubert church and graveyard ^{(nl)} ^{(de)}		Amel		50.354589°N 6.170028°E	31027 Info	St. Hubert church and graveyard
Antoniushäuschen ^{(nl)} ^{(de)}		Amel		50.354589°N 6.170028°E	31428 Info	Antoniushäuschen
Chapel of St. Sebastian ^{(nl)} ^{(de)}		Amel		50.360821°N 6.157186°E	31006 Info	Chapel of St. Sebastian
St. Barbara chapel ^{(nl)} ^{(de)}		Amel		50.361259°N 6.128741°E	31007 Info	St. Barbara chapel
St. Martin's church ^{(nl)} ^{(de)}		Amel		50.328798°N 6.188986°E	31008 Info	St. Martin's church
Memorial cross ^{(nl)} ^{(de)}		Amel		50.328225°N 6.222489°E	31005 Info	Memorial cross
Hof Schoppen ^{(nl)} ^{(de)}		Amel		50.390653°N 6.179180°E	31009 Info	Hof Schoppen
Hülsburg ^{(nl)} ^{(de)}		Amel		50.345477°N 6.110511°E	31021 Info	

== See also ==
- Lists of protected heritage sites in the German-speaking Community of Belgium
- List of protected heritage sites in Liège (province)
- Amel
