= List of protected heritage sites in Frasnes-lez-Anvaing =

This table shows an overview of the protected heritage sites in the Walloon town Frasnes-lez-Anvaing. This list is part of Belgium's national heritage.

Object	Year/architect	Town/section	Address	Coordinates	Number^{?}	Image
Castle: facades and roofs of the castle and its outbuildings, dining and Gothic fireplace in the entrance hall, Drève du Château n ° s 3-5-7 and park ^{(nl)} ^{(fr)}		Frasnes-lez-Anvaing		50.677053°N 3.577426°E	51065-CLT-0001-01 Info	Kasteel: gevels en daken van het kasteel en de bijgebouwen, eetkamer en gotische open haard in hal van de entree, drève du Château n°s 3-5-7 en park
Church of Saint-Georges ^{(nl)} ^{(fr)}		Frasnes-lez-Anvaing		50.688324°N 3.533263°E	51065-CLT-0004-01 Info	Kerk Saint-Georges
Windmill and forest named "Moulin Muen", also called "Valentin" ^{(nl)} ^{(fr)}		Frasnes-lez-Anvaing	rue de Rome n°7 te Lahamaide (Ellezelles)	50.724701°N 3.612514°E	51065-CLT-0005-01 Info	

== See also ==
- List of protected heritage sites in Hainaut (province)
- Frasnes-lez-Anvaing
