= List of immovable heritage sites in Hasselt (part 4) =

This table shows an overview of the immovable heritage sites in the Flemish town Hasselt. This list is part of Belgium's national heritage.

Object	Status^{?}	Year/architect	Town/section	Address	Coordinates	Number^{?}	Image
elongated farm ^{(nl)} ^{(fr)}			Hasselt	Sasput-Voogdijstraat 74	50.89882°N 5.34038°E	22306 Info	
Farmhouse with separate components ^{(nl)} ^{(fr)}			Hasselt	Sasput-Voogdijstraat 76	50.89856°N 5.33984°E	22307 Info	
Chapel Sasput ^{(nl)} ^{(fr)}			Hasselt	Siegersveldstraat	50.89709°N 5.33652°E	22308 Info	
Farmhouse with separate components ^{(nl)} ^{(fr)}	Yes		Hasselt	Siegersveldstraat 6	50.90039°N 5.34019°E	22309 Info	
Farm with loose components ^{(nl)} ^{(fr)}			Hasselt	Siegersveldstraat 12	50.90122°N 5.34109°E	22310 Info	
Farm with loose components ^{(nl)} ^{(fr)}			Hasselt	Siegersveldstraat 32	50.90171°N 5.33982°E	22311 Info	
Farm with loose components ^{(nl)} ^{(fr)}			Hasselt	Siegersveldstraat 17	50.90101°N 5.33996°E	22312 Info	
Farm with loose components ^{(nl)} ^{(fr)}			Hasselt	Steenberg 56	50.89321°N 5.32167°E	22318 Info	
Farm with loose components ^{(nl)} ^{(fr)}			Hasselt	Steenberg 66	50.89287°N 5.32725°E	22319 Info	
Groenkeswinning closed farm ^{(nl)} ^{(fr)}			Hasselt	Steenberg 74	50.89235°N 5.32855°E	22322 Info	
Semi-closed farm ^{(nl)} ^{(fr)}			Hasselt	Uilstraat 9	50.90413°N 5.33010°E	22324 Info	
Farm with loose components ^{(nl)} ^{(fr)}			Hasselt	Uilstraat 30	50.90507°N 5.33495°E	22325 Info	
Chapel of the Steenberg ^{(nl)} ^{(fr)}			Hasselt	Vorststraat	50.89698°N 5.31314°E	22326 Info	
Castle Wideux ^{(nl)} ^{(fr)}			Hasselt	Wideuxdreef 2	50.90888°N 5.28101°E	22328 Info	
Castle Wideux ^{(nl)} ^{(fr)}			Hasselt	Wideuxdreef 3	50.90888°N 5.28101°E	22328 Info	
Castle Wideux ^{(nl)} ^{(fr)}			Hasselt	Wideuxdreef 4	50.90888°N 5.28101°E	22328 Info	
Castle Wideux ^{(nl)} ^{(fr)}			Hasselt	Wideuxdreef 5	50.90888°N 5.28101°E	22328 Info	
St. Martin Parish ^{(nl)} ^{(fr)}	Yes		Hasselt	Sint-Maartenplein	50.91657°N 5.25062°E	22329 Info	More images
Rectory of the St. Martin Parish ^{(nl)} ^{(fr)}			Hasselt	Alkenstraat 5	50.91539°N 5.24992°E	22331 Info	
Brewery (former) ^{(nl)} ^{(fr)}			Hasselt	Alkenstraat 7	50.91532°N 5.25030°E	22332 Info	
elongated farm (former) ^{(nl)} ^{(fr)}			Hasselt	Alkenstraat 104	50.90888°N 5.25864°E	22334 Info	
U-shaped farm, former koewachterswoning ^{(nl)} ^{(fr)}	Yes		Hasselt	Broekstraat 60	50.91256°N 5.25924°E	22335 Info	
Schoolhouse "Mariaburcht" ^{(nl)} ^{(fr)}			Hasselt	Hasseltse dreef 115	50.91927°N 5.24918°E	22337 Info	
Kasteelhoeve "Kann Aerts Court" or "Cannart's Court" ^{(nl)} ^{(fr)}			Hasselt	Kannaertsstraat	50.92188°N 5.27443°E	22338 Info	
Farm loose components ^{(nl)} ^{(fr)}			Hasselt	Herkkantstraat 29	50.92019°N 5.24325°E	22339 Info	
Elsartmolen or "Elster Mill", watermill ^{(nl)} ^{(fr)}			Hasselt	Herkkantstraat 58	50.92283°N 5.23144°E	22341 Info	
Elsartmolen or "Elster Mill", watermill ^{(nl)} ^{(fr)}			Hasselt	Herkkantstraat 60	50.92283°N 5.23144°E	22341 Info	
Semi-closed farm ^{(nl)} ^{(fr)}			Hasselt	Herkkantstraat 105	50.92493°N 5.22999°E	22342 Info	
elongated farm ^{(nl)} ^{(fr)}			Hasselt	Jannestraat 37	50.91252°N 5.23817°E	22344 Info	
Farmhouse with separate components ^{(nl)} ^{(fr)}			Hasselt	Jannestraat 83	50.90929°N 5.23541°E	22345 Info	
Farmhouse with separate components ^{(nl)} ^{(fr)}			Hasselt	Jannestraat 127	50.90634°N 5.23240°E	22346 Info	
Farmstead "Hompelepomp" ^{(nl)} ^{(fr)}			Hasselt	Kannaertsstraat 68	50.92435°N 5.26314°E	22348 Info	
Farm Busselkenswinning ^{(nl)} ^{(fr)}	Yes		Hasselt	Kermtstraat 118	50.93978°N 5.24412°E	22349 Info	
Winning Scholte semi-closed farm ^{(nl)} ^{(fr)}			Hasselt	Kermtstraat 130		22350 Info	
Farm "Vuileplas" closed farm ^{(nl)} ^{(fr)}			Hasselt	Kermtstraat 182	50.92662°N 5.24946°E	22351 Info	
Closed farm ^{(nl)} ^{(fr)}	Yes		Hasselt	Kermtstraat 185	50.92846°N 5.24958°E	22352 Info	
Farmhouse with separate components ^{(nl)} ^{(fr)}	Yes		Hasselt	Kolmenstraat 22	50.91581°N 5.24482°E	22353 Info	
L-shaped farmhouse ^{(nl)} ^{(fr)}		GESLOOPT	Hasselt	Kozenstraat 46	50.90824°N 5.24918°E	22354 Info	
Closed farm ^{(nl)} ^{(fr)}			Hasselt	Nitsemstraat 18	50.89762°N 5.24209°E	22360 Info	
Rectory ^{(nl)} ^{(fr)}			Hasselt	Oppenstraat 44		22361 Info	
Farmhouse with separate components ^{(nl)} ^{(fr)}			Hasselt	Sint-Maartenplein 62	50.91662°N 5.24763°E	22365 Info	
Post Office and nearby railway station of 1901 ^{(nl)} ^{(fr)}			Hasselt	Sint-Maartenplein 80	50.91736°N 5.24660°E	22366 Info	
Watermill on the Herk ^{(nl)} ^{(fr)}	Yes		Hasselt	Sint-Maartenplein 35	50.91715°N 5.24813°E	22367 Info	
St. Nicholas Parish ^{(nl)} ^{(fr)}			Hasselt	Smetstraat	50.88300°N 5.35286°E	22369 Info	
U-shaped farm ^{(nl)} ^{(fr)}	Yes		Hasselt	Luikersteenweg 703	50.88384°N 5.35223°E	22370 Info	
Castle Wimmertingen ^{(nl)} ^{(fr)}			Hasselt	Luikersteenweg 741	50.88204°N 5.35447°E	22371 Info	
Farm "De Oude Barier" former toll ^{(nl)}			Hasselt	Luikersteenweg 773	50.88037°N 5.35681°E	22373 Info	
"In de klok" closed farm ^{(nl)}	Yes		Hasselt	Luikersteenweg 512	50.88316°N 5.35365°E	22374 Info	
U-shaped farm ^{(nl)} ^{(fr)}			Hasselt	Luikersteenweg 516	50.88308°N 5.35385°E	22375 Info	
Closed farm ^{(nl)} ^{(fr)}			Hasselt	Luikersteenweg 530	50.88249°N 5.35473°E	22377 Info	
Farm with loose components ^{(nl)} ^{(fr)}			Hasselt	Smetstraat 36	50.88136°N 5.35004°E	22379 Info	
L-shaped farmhouse ^{(nl)} ^{(fr)}	Yes		Hasselt	Wimmertingenstraat 20	50.88422°N 5.34985°E	22380 Info	
Closed farm ^{(nl)} ^{(fr)}	Yes		Hasselt	Wimmertingenstraat 38	50.88417°N 5.34817°E	22381 Info	
Houses, former elongated farm ^{(nl)} ^{(fr)}			Hasselt	Wimmertingenstraat 72	50.88221°N 5.34723°E	22382 Info	
Farmhouse with separate components ^{(nl)} ^{(fr)}			Hasselt	Goorstraat 115	50.97757°N 5.29989°E	22520 Info	
house ^{(nl)} ^{(fr)}			Hasselt	Maastrichterstraat 105	50.93013°N 5.34308°E	83602 Info	
Farmstead "Ten Roye", farm with separate components ^{(nl)} ^{(fr)}			Hasselt	Kermtstraat 43	50.94266°N 5.25112°E	83606 Info	
Farmworkers Housing ^{(nl)} ^{(fr)}	Yes		Hasselt	Lummense Kiezel 71	50.95567°N 5.24055°E	83608 Info	
Veldeke Mill, former waterwheel mill ^{(nl)} ^{(fr)}			Hasselt	Lummense Kiezel 111	50.96279°N 5.23483°E	83609 Info	
Farmhouse with separate components, currently a two-family ^{(nl)} ^{(fr)}			Hasselt	Sint-Truidersteenweg 569-571	50.89778°N 5.30619°E	83610 Info	
Farm with L-shaped plan ^{(nl)} ^{(fr)}			Hasselt	Wimmertingenstraat 76	50.88171°N 5.34724°E	83611 Info	
Statue of H. of Veldeke ^{(nl)} ^{(fr)}	Yes		Hasselt	Thonissenlaan	50.9324°N 5.33446°E	200357 Info	
Chapel Wall ^{(nl)} ^{(fr)}	Yes		Hasselt	Schrijnwerkersstraat	50.93200°N 5.33628°E	200358 Info	
Statue "The Peasants' War" ^{(nl)} ^{(fr)}	Yes		Hasselt	Leopoldplein	50.92796°N 5.33493°E	200359 Info	
House "The Engelkes" ^{(nl)}	Yes		Hasselt	Guffenslaan 34	50.92768°N 5.33971°E	200366 Info	
Square farm and immediate surroundings ^{(nl)} ^{(fr)}	Yes		Hasselt	Kermtstraat 158	50.93386°N 5.25053°E	200383 Info	
Old Cemetery, Hasselt ^{(nl)} ^{(fr)}	Yes		Hasselt	Kempische steenweg 87	50.93694°N 5.34157°E	200394 Info	More images
Distillery Smeets ^{(nl)} ^{(fr)}	Yes		Hasselt	Raamstraat 17		200650 Info	
Chapel Wideux ^{(nl)} ^{(fr)}	Yes		Hasselt	Grote Roost	50.91182°N 5.28901°E	200658 Info	
Villa Sampermans ^{(nl)} ^{(fr)}	Yes		Hasselt	Kuringersteenweg 124	50.93469°N 5.32152°E	200668 Info	
Lattice Farm ^{(nl)} ^{(fr)}	Yes		Hasselt	Sasput 47		206017 Info	
Ruland villa with offices and warehouses ^{(nl)} ^{(fr)}	Yes		Hasselt	Kuringersteenweg 44		206833 Info	
Rooi Anna farm ^{(nl)} ^{(fr)}	Yes		Hasselt	Beerhoutstraat 64		207032 Info	
Elongated farm ^{(nl)} ^{(fr)}	Yes		Hasselt	Platte-Vijversstraat 8		207035 Info	
Modernist house Douchar ^{(nl)} ^{(fr)}	Yes		Hasselt	Koningin Astridlaan 67		212718 Info	

== See also ==
- List of onroerend erfgoed in Limburg (Belgium)
- Hasselt
