= List of protected heritage sites in Lobbes =

This table shows an overview of the protected heritage sites in the Walloon town Lobbes. This list is part of Belgium's national heritage.

Object	Year/architect	Town/section	Address	Coordinates	Number^{?}	Image
Church of St. Ursmarus ^{(nl)} ^{(fr)}		Lobbes		50.346380°N 4.266056°E	56044-CLT-0001-01 Info	Sint-Ursmaruskerk
Pres du Sart, Forge the Grignard ^{(nl)} ^{(fr)}		Lobbes		50.331334°N 4.225613°E	56044-CLT-0003-01 Info	
Woodlands of "Bois à Tourettes" and along the street "rue du Moulin du Bois". ^{(nl)} ^{(fr)}		Lobbes		50.349432°N 4.255791°E	56044-CLT-0004-01 Info	
The Portelette and the outer walls fifty feet apart, and the ensemble formed by the Portelette, the walls and the surrounding area ^{(nl)} ^{(fr)}		Lobbes	rue de Binche n°2	50.349588°N 4.258711°E	56044-CLT-0006-01 Info	De portelette en de buitenste muren van vijftig meter uit elkaar en het ensemble gevormd door de Portelette, de muren en het omliggende gebied
Ensemble of the church Saint-Ursmer, except the organ, the tower of the cross and the west portal ^{(nl)} ^{(fr)}		Lobbes		50.346380°N 4.266056°E	56044-PEX-0001-01 Info	Ensemble van de kerk Saint-Ursmer, uitgezonderd het orgel, de toren van het kruis en het westportaal

== See also ==
- List of protected heritage sites in Hainaut (province)
- Lobbes
