= List of protected heritage sites in Bütgenbach =

This table shows an overview of the protected heritage sites in the Walloon town Bütgenbach. This list is part of Belgium's national heritage.

Object	Year/architect	Town/section	Address	Coordinates	Number	Image
Farmhouse ^{(nl)} ^{(de)}		Bütgenbach		50.427592°N 6.201146°E	31002 Info	Farmhouse
Schwalmbachtal (area) ^{(nl)} ^{(de)}		Bütgenbach		50.499080°N 6.284869°E	31041 Info	Schwalmbachtal (area)
Hohe mark (area) ^{(nl)} ^{(de)}		Bütgenbach		50.488129°N 6.229235°E	31044 Info	Hohe mark (area)
Mausheck-Kolberg (area) ^{(nl)} ^{(de)}		Bütgenbach		50.436917°N 6.197253°E	31042 Info	Mausheck-Kolberg (area)
Old basswood or Linden tree ^{(nl)} ^{(de)}		Bütgenbach		50.435148°N 6.164545°E	31043 Info	Old basswood or Linden tree
Farmhouse ^{(nl)} ^{(de)}		Bütgenbach	Hof Lindenstrasse 12	50.433182°N 6.164458°E	31032 Info	Farmhouse
Border marker Julich ^{(nl)} ^{(de)}		Bütgenbach		50.478394°N 6.308585°E	31031 Info	

== See also ==
- Lists of protected heritage sites in the German-speaking Community of Belgium
- List of protected heritage sites in Liège (province)
- Bütgenbach
