= List of protected heritage sites in Court-Saint-Étienne =

This table shows an overview of the protected heritage sites in the Walloon town Court-Saint-Étienne. This list is part of Belgium's national heritage.

Object	Year/architect	Town/section	Address	Coordinates	Number^{?}	Image
Ruins of the chapel of Sart-Messire-Guillaume, and the ensemble of the ruins and their environment ^{(nl)} ^{(fr)}		Court-Saint-Etienne	Court-Saint-Etienne	50.619633°N 4.564093°E	25023-CLT-0001-01	Ruïnes van de kapel van Sart-Messire-Guillaume, en het ensemble van de ruïnes en de omgeving
Ensemble of the castle park of Court-Saint-Etienne ^{(nl)} ^{(fr)}		Court-Saint-Etienne		50.642460°N 4.569084°E	25023-CLT-0002-01	
Ensemble of the park Wisterzee ^{(nl)} ^{(fr)}		Court-Saint-Etienne	Cour-Saint-Etienne	50.650086°N 4.561790°E	25023-CLT-0003-01	Ensemble van het park van Wisterzée
Church of Saint-Etienne and the wall around the cemetery and the ensemble of the church, the presbytery, the cemetery and their environment ^{(nl)} ^{(fr)}		Court-Saint-Etienne	Court-Saint-Etienne	50.642686°N 4.568263°E	25023-CLT-0005-01	Kerk Saint-Etienne en de muur rond de begraafplaats en het ensemble van de kerk, de pastorie, de begraafplaats en de omgeving
Gravestone Goblet d'Alviella in the old communal cemetery, and the ensemble of the building and its surroundings ^{(nl)} ^{(fr)}		Court-Saint-Etienne	Court-Saint-Etienne	50.638915°N 4.561163°E	25023-CLT-0006-01	Grafmonument Goblet d'Alviella op de oude gemeenschappelijke begraafplaats, en het ensemble van het bouwwerk en diens omgeving
Facades and roofs of the house ^{(nl)} ^{(fr)}		Court-Saint-Etienne	Place Communale n°6, Court-Saint-Etienne	50.643176°N 4.567331°E	25023-CLT-0007-01	
Facades and roofs of the four great wings of the farm Sartage and the ensemble of the building and surrounding area ^{(nl)} ^{(fr)}		Court-Saint-Etienne	Drève du Chenoy	50.603332°N 4.572623°E	25023-CLT-0008-01	
Facades and roofs of buildings which together constitute the farm Beaurieux ^{(nl)} ^{(fr)}		Court-Saint-Etienne	rue Saussale, Court-Saint-Etienne	50.640344°N 4.594888°E	25023-CLT-0009-01	Gevels en daken van gebouwen die samen de boerderij Beaurieux vormen
The street, sidewalks and buildings along both sides of the rue du Village in Court-Saint-Etienne (EA) and the ensemble of streets, sidewalks and buildings along the street and gardens ^{(nl)} ^{(fr)}		Court-Saint-Etienne	rue du Village	50.642416°N 4.569190°E	25023-CLT-0010-01	De straat, trottoirs en gebouwen langs beide zijden van de rue du Village in Court-Saint-Etienne (EA) en het ensemble van de straten, trottoirs en gebouwen langs de straat en de tuinen
Hall n ° 11 de l'usine Henricot No. 1 ^{(nl)} ^{(fr)}		Court-Saint-Etienne	rue Emile Henricot n° 4, Court-Saint-Etienne	50.645678°N 4.567816°E	25023-CLT-0011-01	Hall n° 11 de l'usine Henricot n°1
Facades, roofs, main hall and location of the theatre "Foyer populaire" ^{(nl)} ^{(fr)}		Court-Saint-Etienne	rue Belotte 1	50.647346°N 4.565487°E	25023-CLT-0012-01	Gevels, daken en locatie van de Foyer populaire
Chapel of Try-au-Chêne and the shrines of Our Lady of Alsemberg and the ensemble of these monuments and their surroundings ^{(nl)} ^{(fr)}		Court-Saint-Etienne		50.608099°N 4.514121°E	25023-CLT-0013-01	Kapel du Try-au-Chêne en de heiligdommen van Onze Lieve Vrouw van Alsemberg en het ensemble van deze monumenten en hun omgeving
The mausoleum of Count Goblet d'Alviella ^{(nl)} ^{(fr)}		Court-Saint-Etienne		50.638915°N 4.561163°E	25023-PEX-0001-01	Het mausoleum van Graaf Goblet d'Alviella

== See also ==
- Lists of protected heritage sites in Walloon Brabant
