= Ninglinspo =

Coordinates: 50.4687°N 5.7468°E

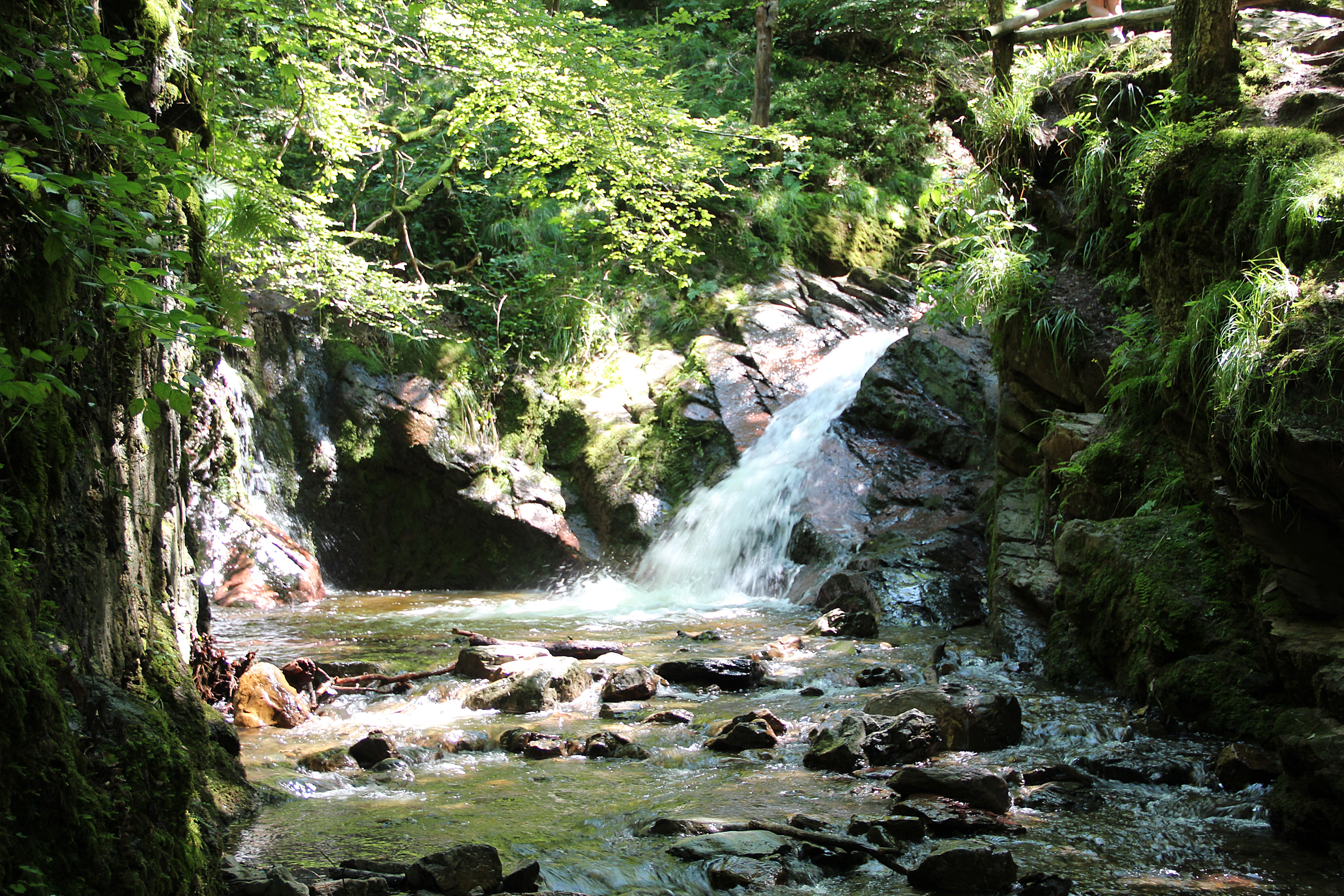
- The Ninglinspo, just before it joins the Amblève river.

Location
- Country: Belgium

Physical characteristics
- Source
  - location: Vert-Buisson in the municipality of Theux
- Mouth
  - location: Amblève, at Nonceveux
- Length: 3.5 km (2.2 mi)

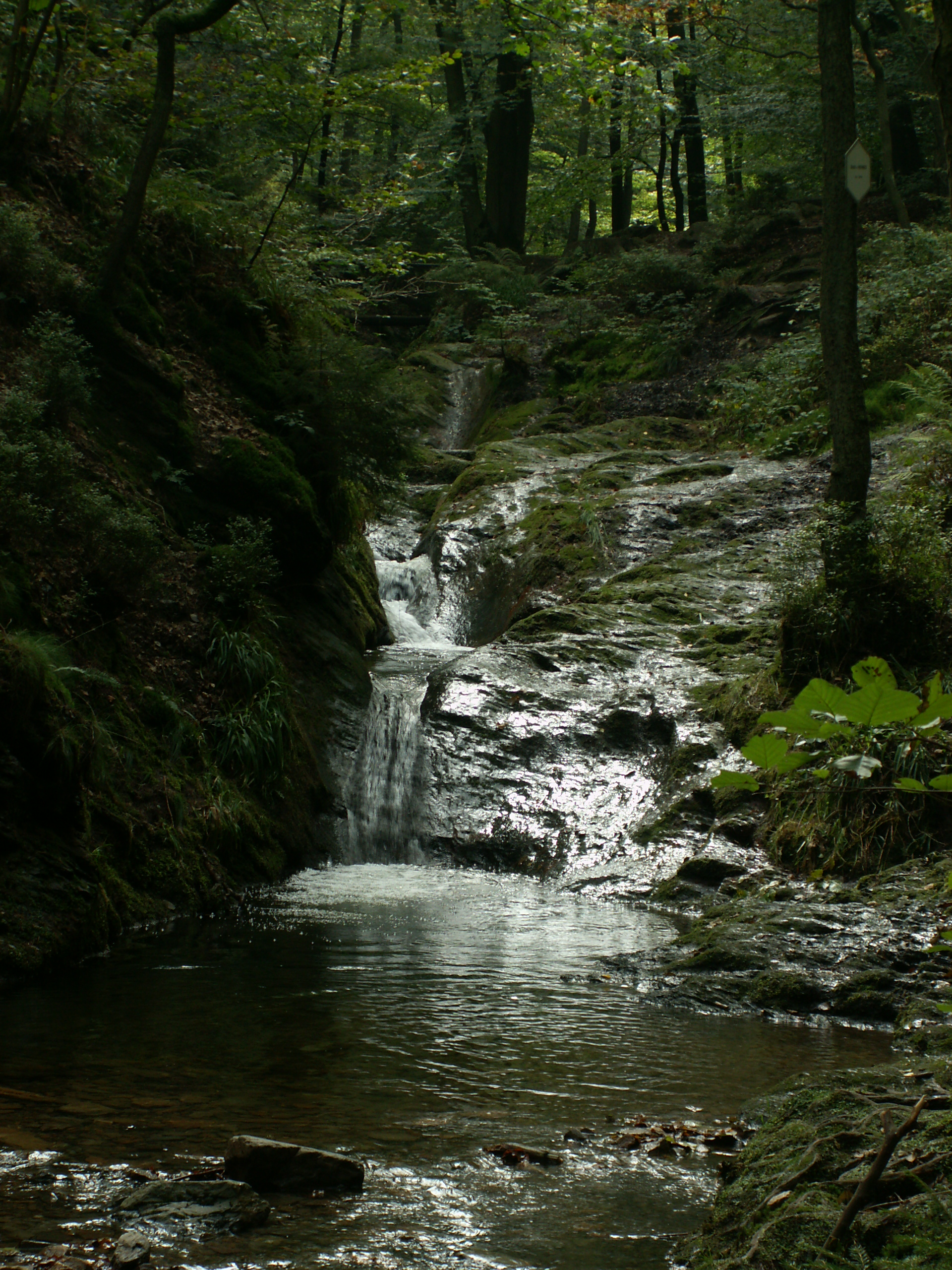
The pool of Diana

The Ninglinspo is a stream in Belgium, tributary of the Amblève upstream from Remouchamps around Quarreux. The valley of Ninglinspo is classed as an outstanding heritage area of Wallonia. It runs between Vert-Buisson and Nonceveux. The Ninglinspo forms rapids around enormous blocks of quartzite, forming a series of pools with evocative names.

The Ninglinspo gets its odd name from an error of French cartographers who mangled quite a few toponyms of the department of the Ourthe, confusing the name of the river with that of the site where it flows into the Amblève. Its original name is the Doulneux, Dulnosus in Latin, found in the Charter of Sigebert III of 647 AD. Dulnosus appears to come from a word meaning an alder wood.

== Crahay Rocks ==
At the top of the valley are the Crahay Rocks, named after J.N. Crahay, a former director of the Department of Water and Forests. They are a puddingstone formed about 300 million years ago when the Ardennes were covered by sea.

== See also ==
- List of rivers in Belgium
