= Amblève (river) =

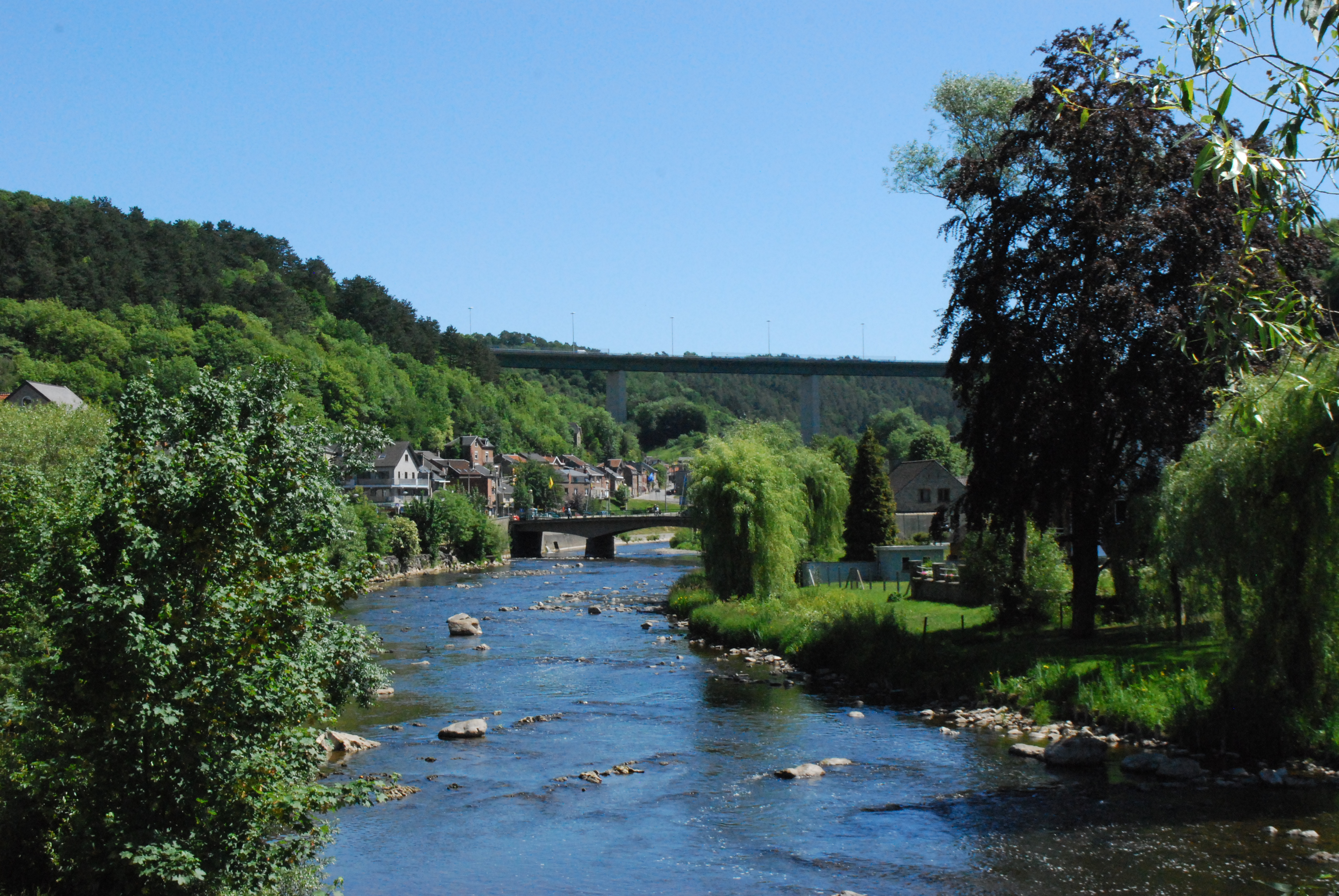

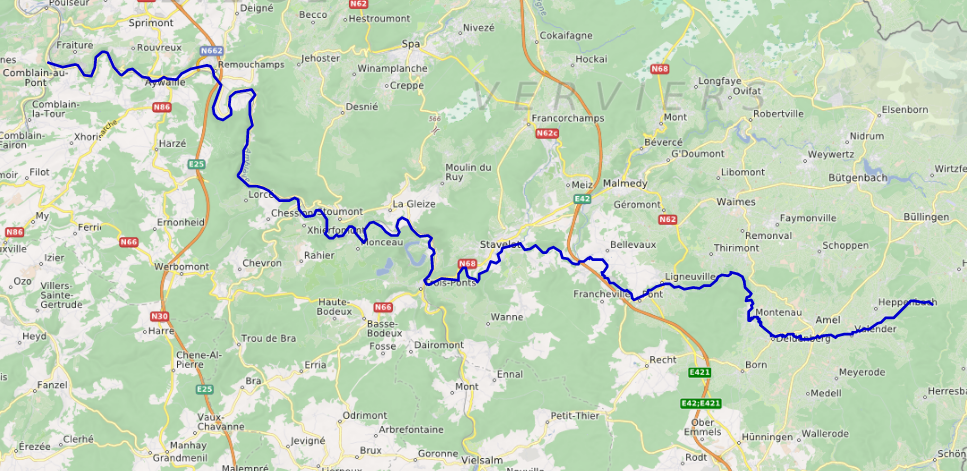

Location
- Country: Belgium

Physical characteristics
- Length: 93 km (58 mi)
- Basin size: 1,077 km^{2} (416 sq mi)
- Discharge
  - average: 19.5 m^{3}/s (690 cu ft/s)

Basin features
- Progression: Ourthe→ Meuse→ North Sea

The Amblève (French, French pronunciation: [ɑ̃blɛv]) or Amel (German, German pronunciation: [ˈaːml̩]) is a 93-kilometre (58 mi) long river in eastern Belgium in the province of Liège. It is a right tributary of the river Ourthe. It rises near Büllingen in the High Fens or Hoge Venen (Dutch), Hohes Venn (German), and Hautes Fagnes (French), close to the border with Germany.

Tributaries of the Amblève are the rivers Chefna, Ninglinspo, Warche, Eau Rouge, Salm and Lienne. The Amblève flows through the towns of Amel, Stavelot, Trois-Ponts, Remouchamps, and Aywaille. The Amblève joins the river Ourthe in Comblain-au-Pont.

== Sites ==
At the village of Coo (near Trois-Ponts) is the Coo Waterfall, which at 15 metres (49 ft) tall is not the highest but one of the better known waterfalls in Belgium. The waterfall was created artificially in the 18th century when local monks cut through a bend in the river to feed a watermill. The dried out river bed is now used as the lower storage basin for the Coo-Trois-Ponts Hydroelectric Power Station.

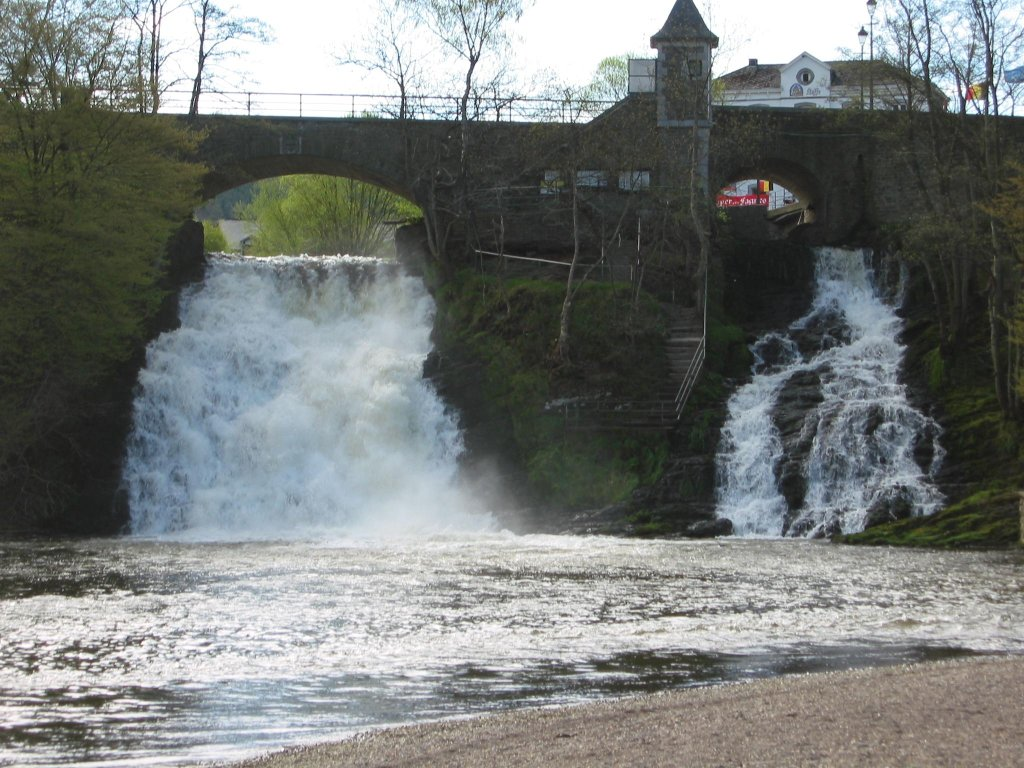
Waterfall at Coo

A curiosity of Lorcé, a nearby village, is the unusual design of the dam located at a place called "Fang-Naze" or "Fagne-Naze." Built between 1928 and 1932, it captures about 50,000 cubic metres (41 acre⋅ft) of water, which is then led through a 3,460-metre (11,350 ft) long tunnel cut out of the hill, before falling 40 metres (130 ft) into the turbines of the power plant "Heid Ile" at Nonceveux part of Aywaille.

On the right bank near Sprimont is the site of the Belle Roche cave, the oldest known place of human occupation of the Benelux (dating back about 500,000 years).

The "Fond de Quareux" stretch of the river near Nonceveux is listed as one of Wallonia's Major Heritage sites.
