= The Marriage of Mademoiselle Beulemans =

The Marriage of Mademoiselle Beulemans may refer to:

- Le Mariage de mademoiselle Beulemans, a 1910 Belgian play
- Film adaptations of the play:
  - The Marriage of Mademoiselle Beulemans (1927 film), a 1927 French silent comedy film
  - The Marriage of Mademoiselle Beulemans (1932 film), a 1932 Belgian-French comedy film
  - The Marriage of Mademoiselle Beulemans (1950 film), a 1950 Belgian-French comedy film
