= Chênée =

Sub-municipality of the city of Liège, Belgium

Chênée Tchinnêye (Walloon)
- Sub-municipality of Liège
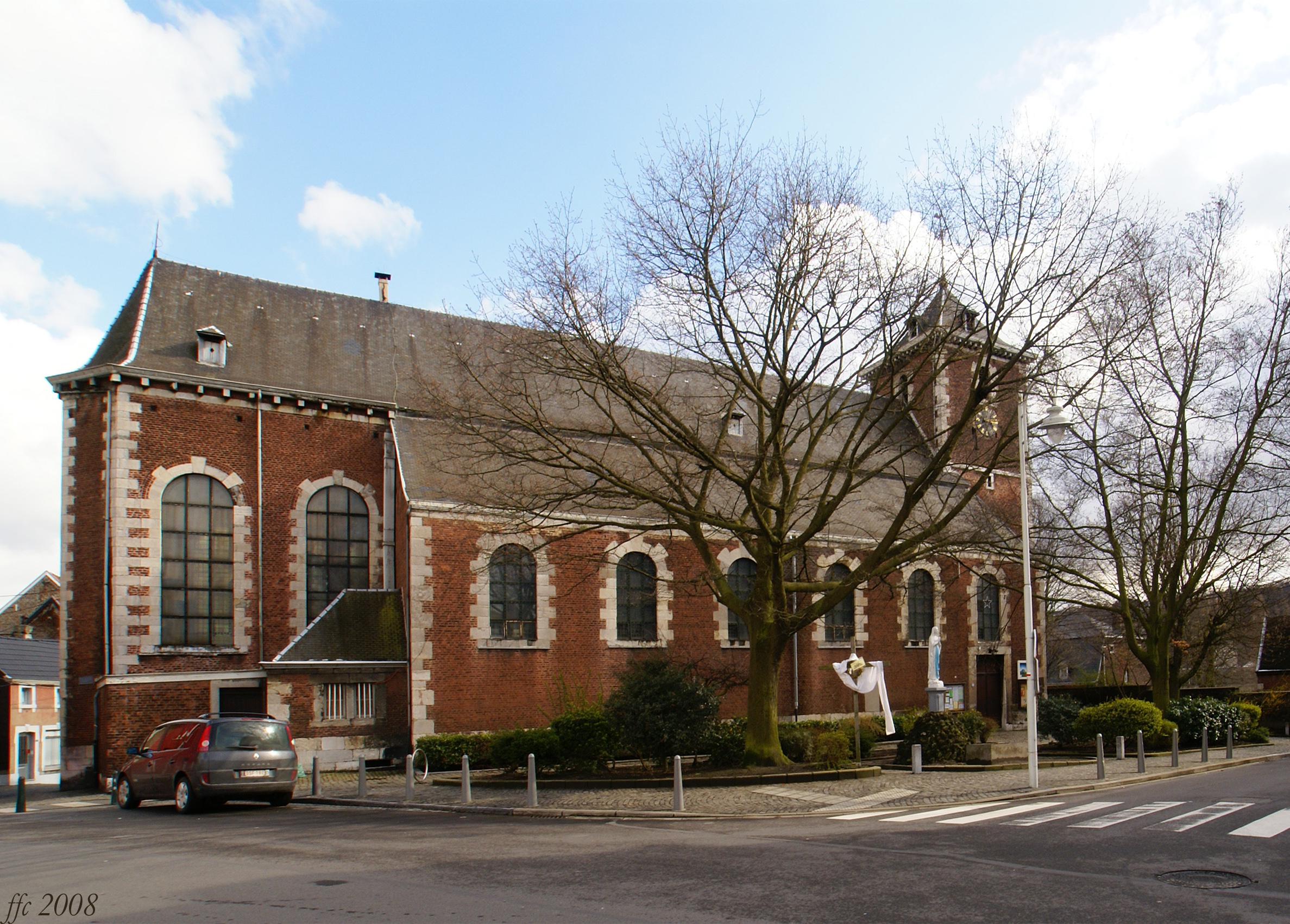
- Church of Saint-Pierre

- Coat of arms

- Location in Liège
- Interactive map of Chênée
- Location within Belgium Location within Liège Province
- Coordinates: 50°36′42″N 5°36′58″E
- Country: Belgium
- Community: French Community
- Region: Wallonia
- Province: Liège
- Arrondissement: Liège
- Municipality: Liège

Area
  - Total: 3.28 km^{2} (1.27 sq mi)

Population (2020-01-01)
  - Total: 9,030
  - Density: 2,750/km^{2} (7,130/sq mi)
- Postal codes: 4032
- Area codes: 04

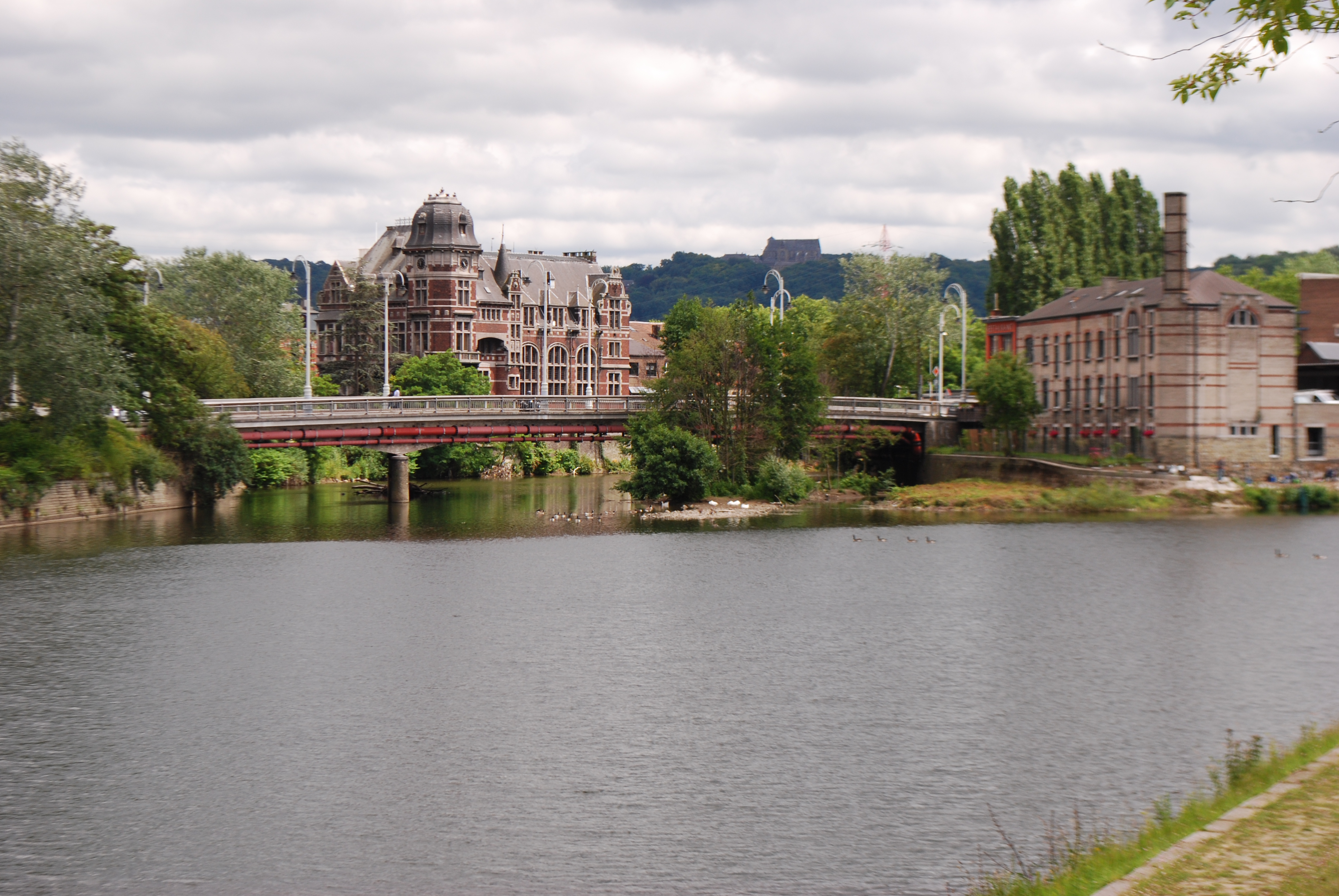
The confluent streams of Vesdre and Ourthe. The red and white building behind the bridge is the old Hôtel de Ville (town hall)

Chênée (French pronunciation: [ʃɛne]; Walloon: Tchinnêye) is a sub-municipality of the city of Liège located in the province of Liège, Wallonia, Belgium. It was a separate municipality until 1977. On 1 January 1977, it was merged into Liège.

Chênée lays at the river mouth of the two rivers Vesdre and Ourthe. It had around 9,101 inhabitants in 2015. The postal code of Chênée is 4032 and is situated around 72 meters above sea level.

== Etymology ==
The coat of arms of Chênée

The name Chênée comes from the French chênaie (oak-grove, a place many oak trees grew). The three diamonds in the coat of arms symbolize oak leaves or grains of sand, reflecting the city's history as a site of glass production.

== History ==
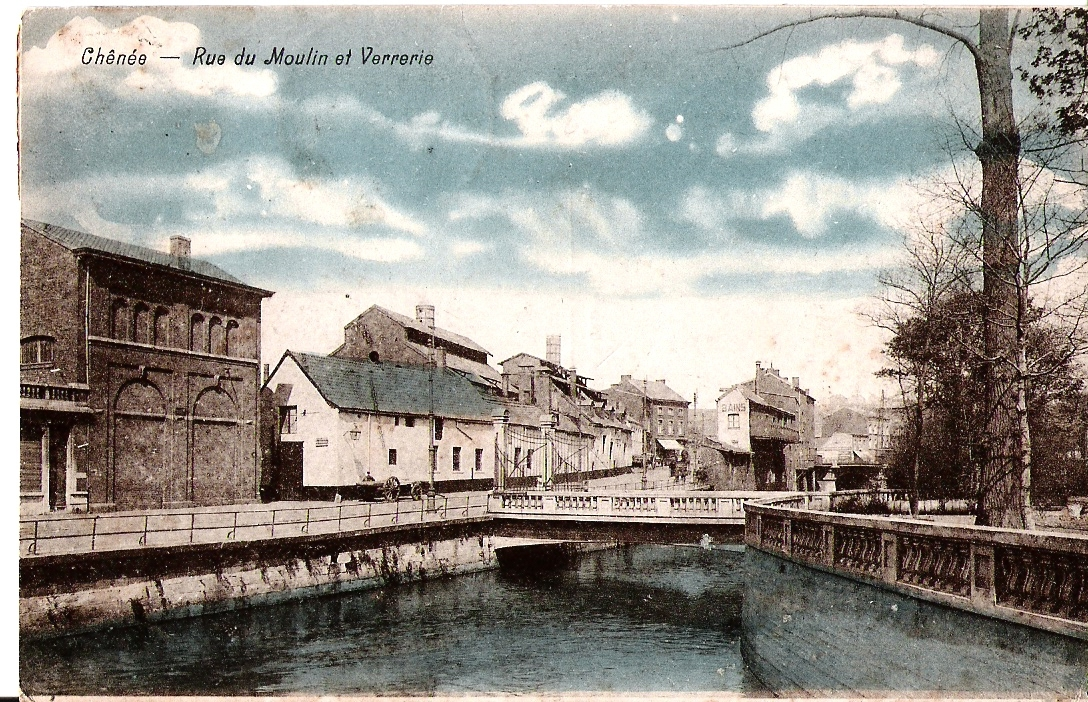
Industrial quarter, Rue du Gravier, 1 "Chênée - Rue du Moulin et Verrerie, (1850)"

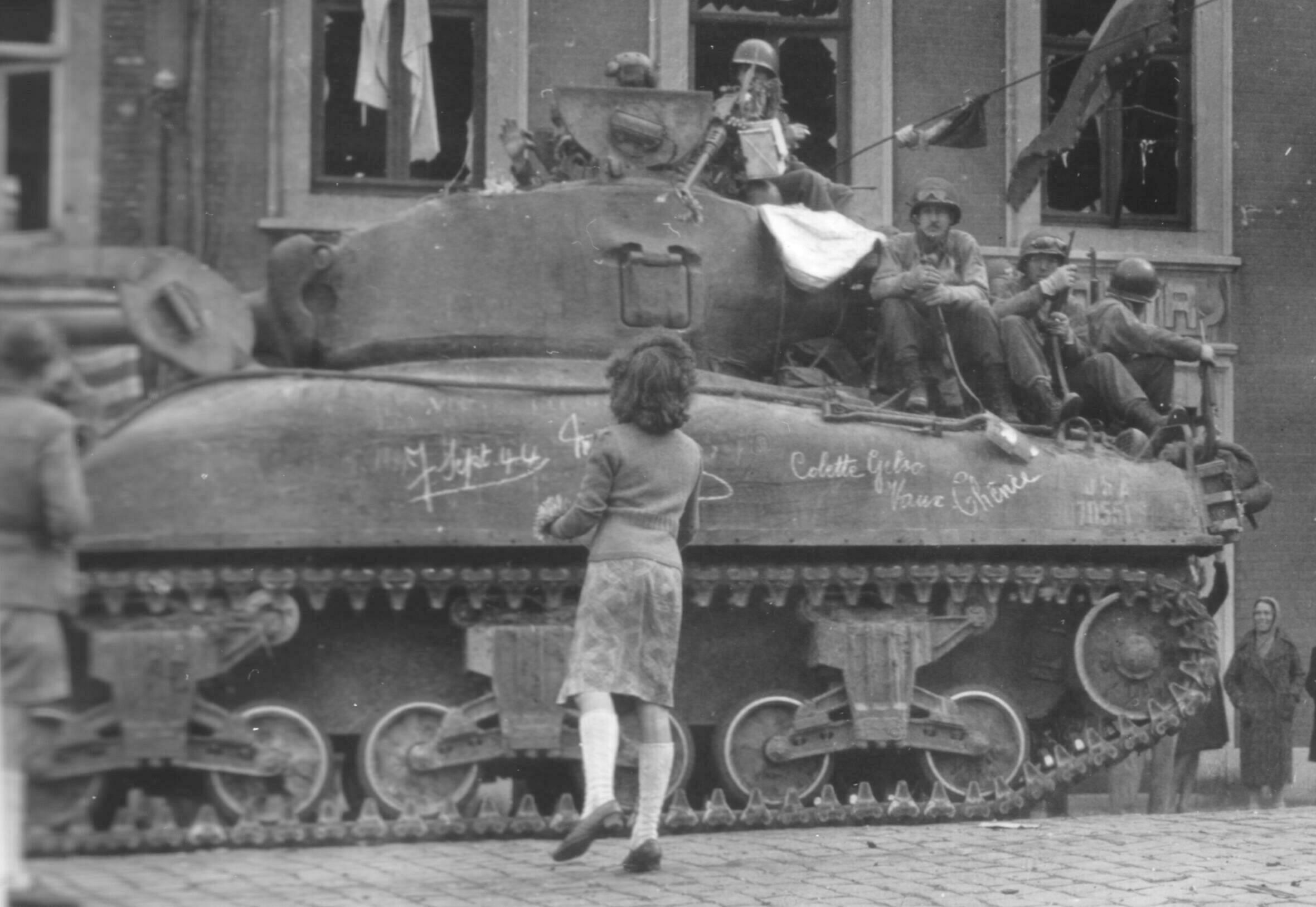
USA 3070551 of 3rd Armored Division is welcomed by inhabitants of Chênè, September 8th, 1944

Chênée originated at the crossing of two Roman roads; the first leading from Trier to Tongeren, the second from Jupille over Theux to Stavelot. The crossing was also close to a ford, which was important to pass cows over the Ourth before the Pont de Lhoneux (the bridge of Lhonneux) was built.

Chênée was mentioned the first time in a 12th-century document under the name of Kesneies. Until 1266 Chênée was part of the Vogtei of Jupille, which was subordinated to the diocese of Verdun. At that year it was affiliated into the principality of Liège. The bishop of Verdun, Haimo of Verdun got the village as a gift from the German Emperor Henry II in the year 1008.

In 1266 the Bishopric of Verdun Robert II of Médidan donated the Vogtei Jupille to the Prince-Bishopric of Liège, Henry III of Geldern. That meant, that all the villages and villagers became property of Henry III and fell under his jurisdiction. Because of his unworthy and extravagant way of life, Henry III was deposed by Gregory X.

In 1318 Chênée was burned down by John of Bohemia while being at war with prince-bishop Adolph II of the Mark.

1691 it was burned, again, this time by the army of Louis XIV of France under its lieutenant-general under the king in person Louis-François de Boufflers.

Chênée also had to suffer from the retreating Austrian army after the lost Battle of Fleurus in 1794. During the French epoch at the end of the 18th century, Chênée became an independent commune.

The Battle of Liège (French: Bataille de Liège) was the opening engagement of the German invasion of Belgium and the first battle of the First World War.

In World War II Chênée was liberated from Nazi occupation by troops of the 36th Infantry Regiment on September 8, 1944.

In 1977 Chênée became a sub-municipality of the city of Liège.

2008 the roof of the Saint-Albert elementary school of Chênée collapsed overnight. Nobody was hurt.

At the junction of Vesder and Ourthe the building of a mill still stands.

== Glass manufacturing ==
External videos
- A silent video of glass production in Chênée in the year of 1931.

There were three glass manufactures in Chênée in 1758: Grandchamps & Coune, Bonniver and Cambresier & Co.

In 1872, the glass factory of Van Steenacker was founded by the entrepreneurs Amiable, Belleflamme, Louvet and Berneau. Around the same time the company S.A. of the Verreries de Vaux-sous-Chèvremont was founded under the direction of Cochet. In the course of the closure of the glassworks Bougart in Manage 1875 one of the sons of Bougart and the production manager Auguste Van Steenacker came to Vaux. They founded the Verrerie Bougart, Sortia et Cie with Cochet, Sortia and Colin.

When the company Belleflamme, Louvet et Berneau gave up its glassworks in Chênée in February 1888, it was taken over by the Verrerie de Vaux.

After François Delhaize and Herman Dethier had succeeded their parents, Auguste Van Steenacker took over the glassworks of Vaux in February 1895 and founded with his sons François-Charles and William the Société anonyme des Verreries de Vaux.

The glassworks of Chênée was then led by François Delhaize. World War I interrupted production. In 1919, production was resumed, but meanwhile the competition had grown abroad.

Many old markets were completely or almost completely lost. The glassworks of Vaux ran into considerable financial difficulties and could not find the urgently needed investor. In 1930, the hut was abandoned, the land and buildings were taken over by Magotteaux.

In the end Verrerie Grandchamps stayed as the local manufacturer. They produced the bottles for the mineral water brand Spa. Verrerie Grandchamps succeeded Verreries d'Amblève, who were founded 1721 in Aywaille.

== People from Chênée ==
- Clélie Lamberty, Artist, painter (1930–2013)
- Charles Descardre, Mayor (1882-1891)
- Lucien François, Judge at the Belgian Constitutional Court (1989–2004) (born in 1934)
- Jean-Louis Lejaxhe, Writer
- Nicolas Gilsoul, Rally Racer (born in 1982)
- Some ancestors of Kate Bolduan, the family Rousselle, emigrated from Chênée to America in 1912.

== Gallery ==
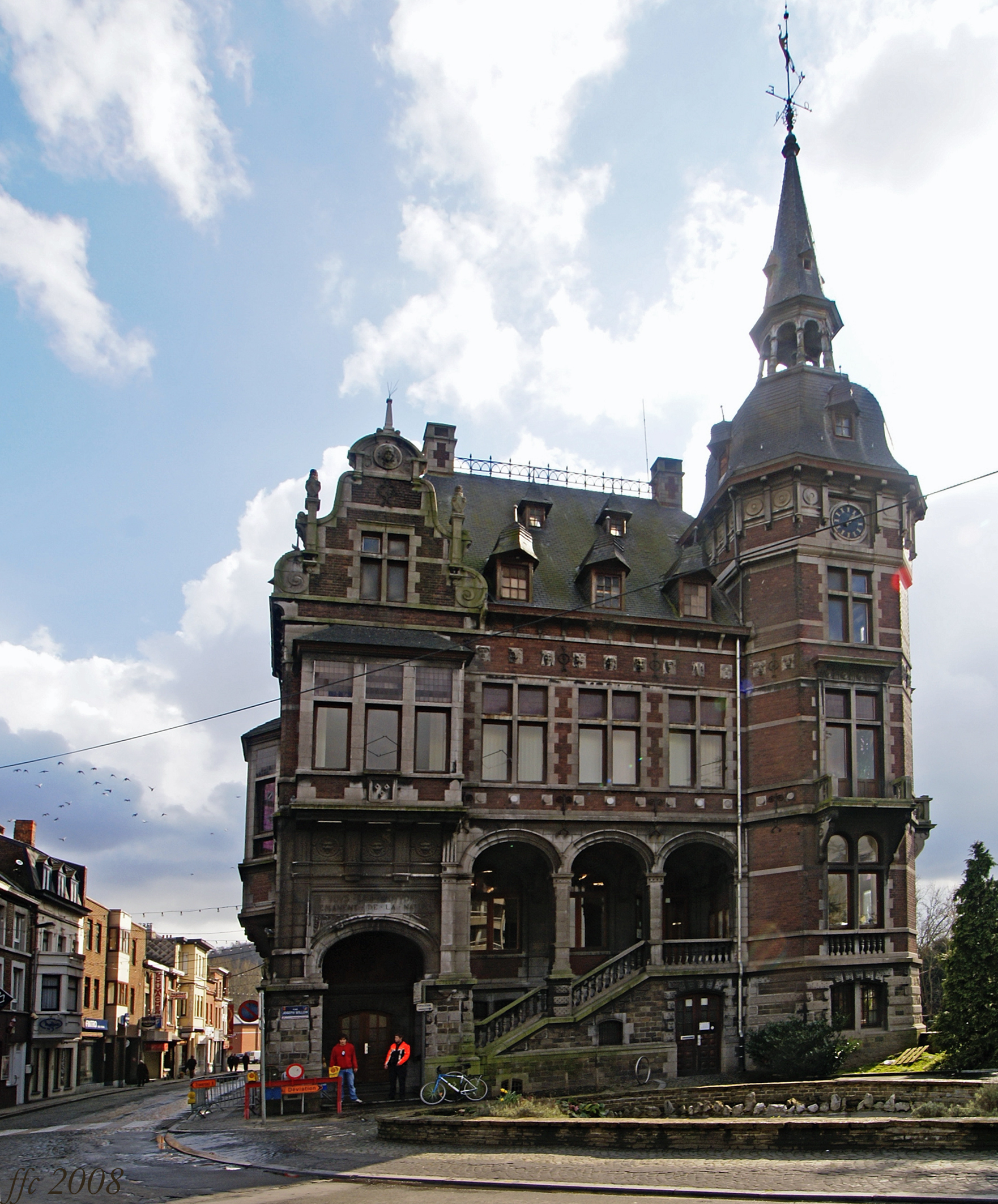
The former parish hall of Chênée.

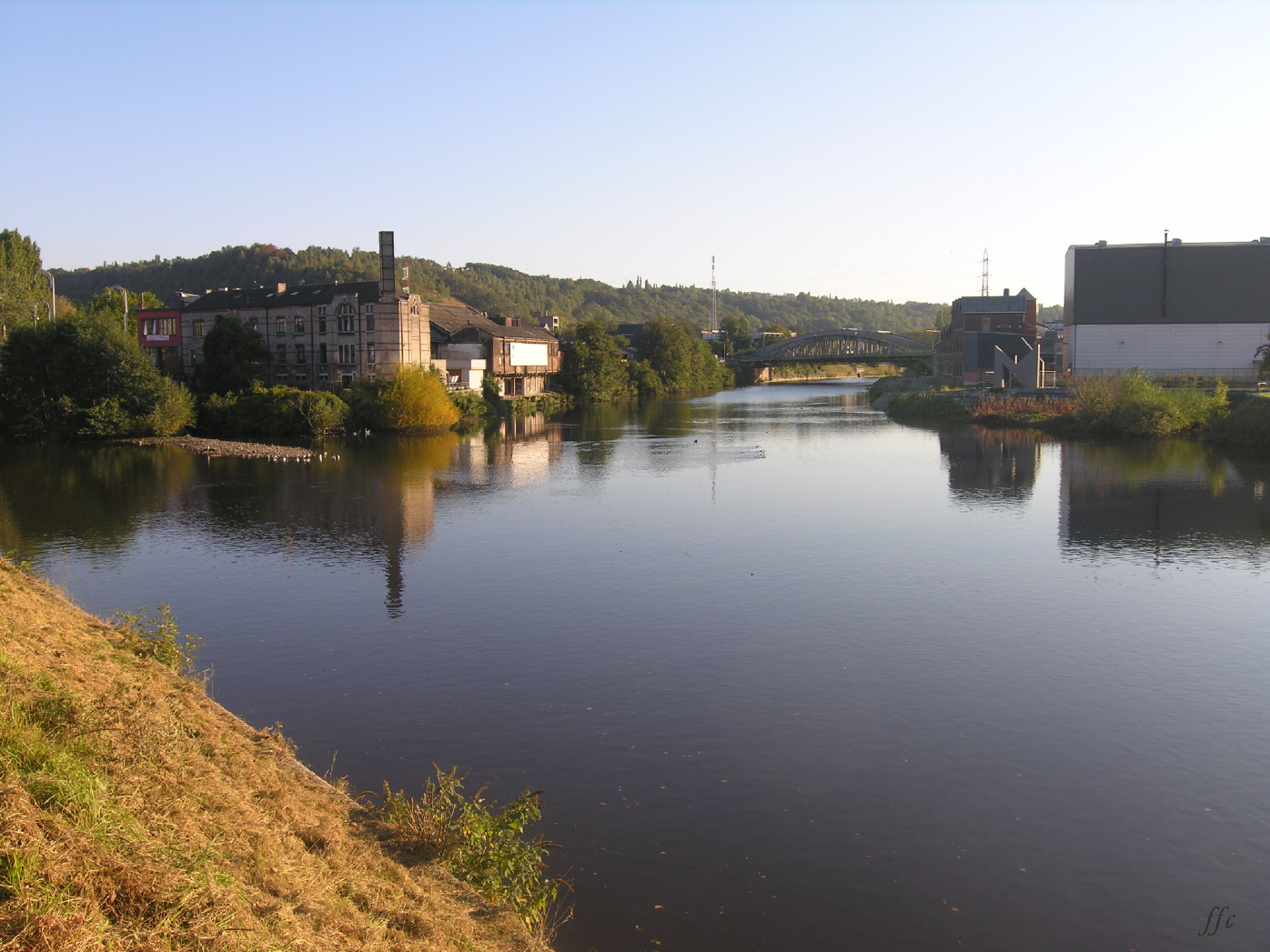
The river mouth of Vesdre (from the left) into the Ourthe.

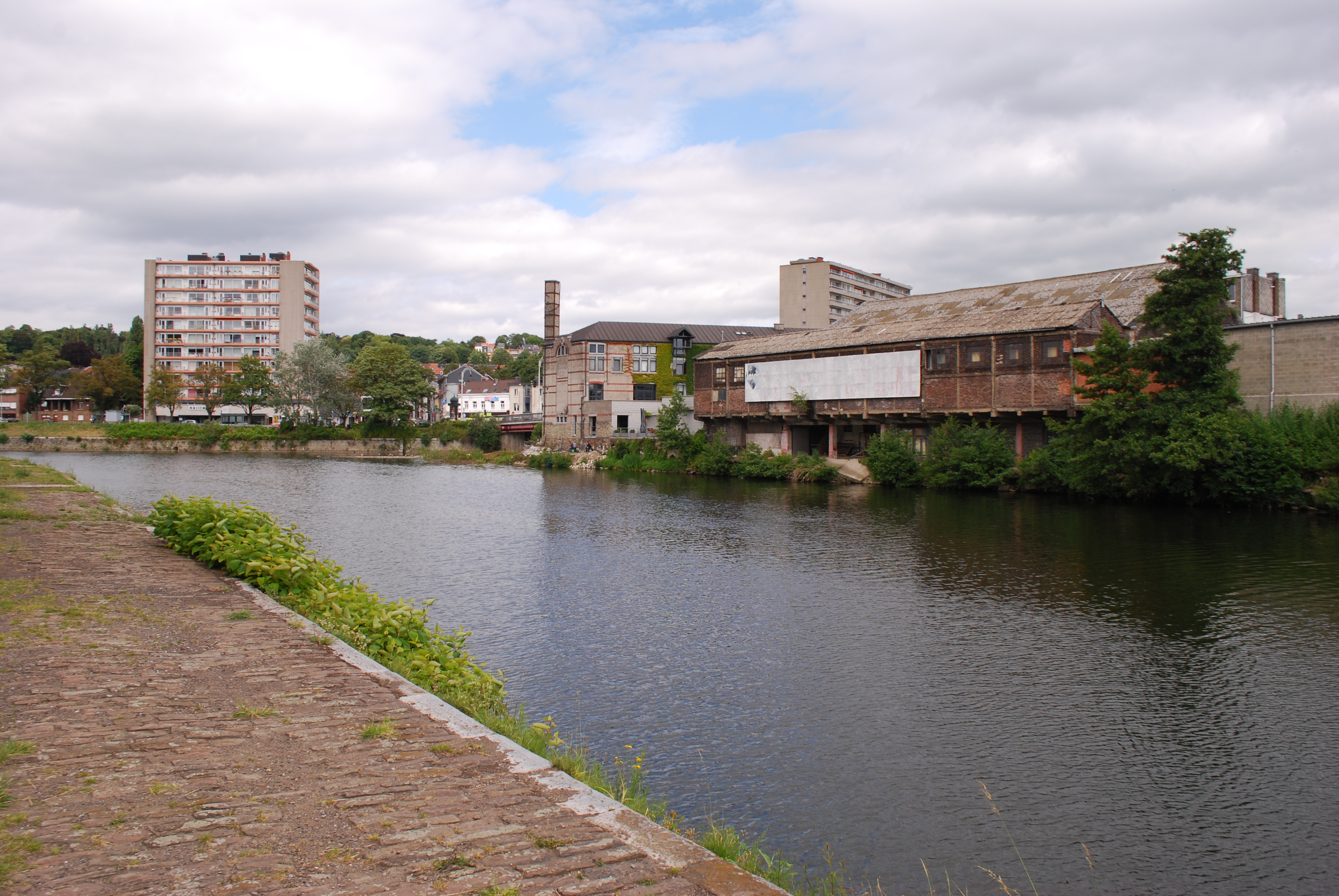
View on the Ourthe

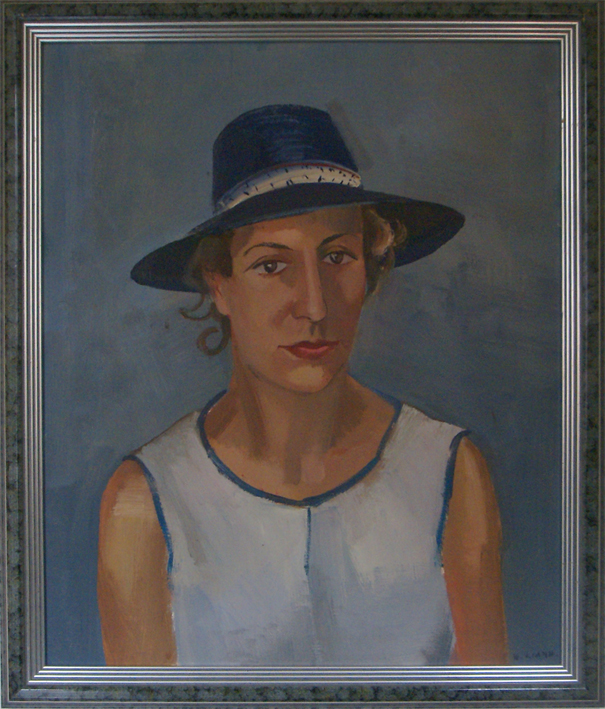
Clélie Lamberty painted by Robert Liard, 1977

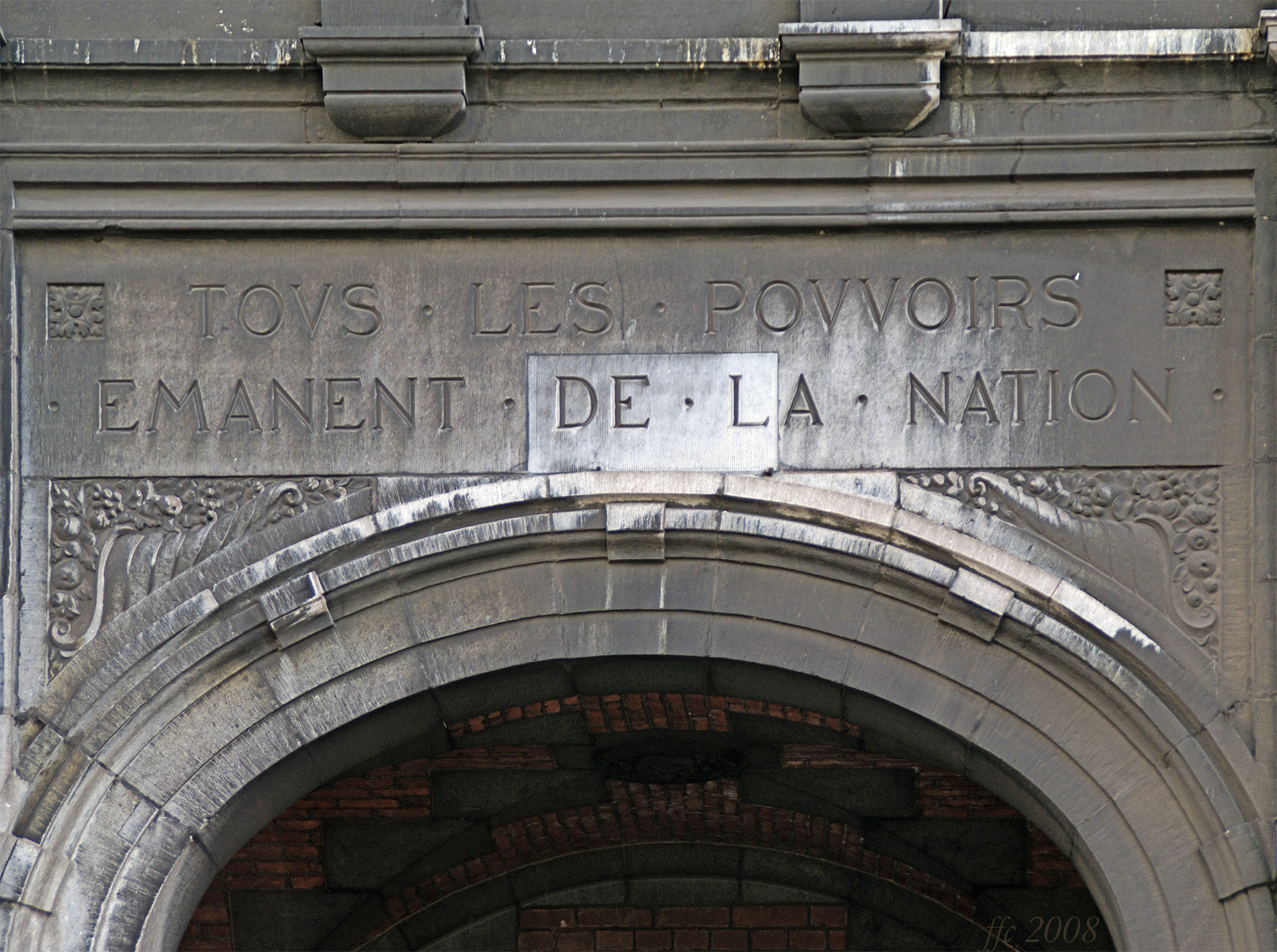
Tous les pouvoirs émanent de la Nation - All powers come from within the nation, Article 33 of the Constitution of Belgium

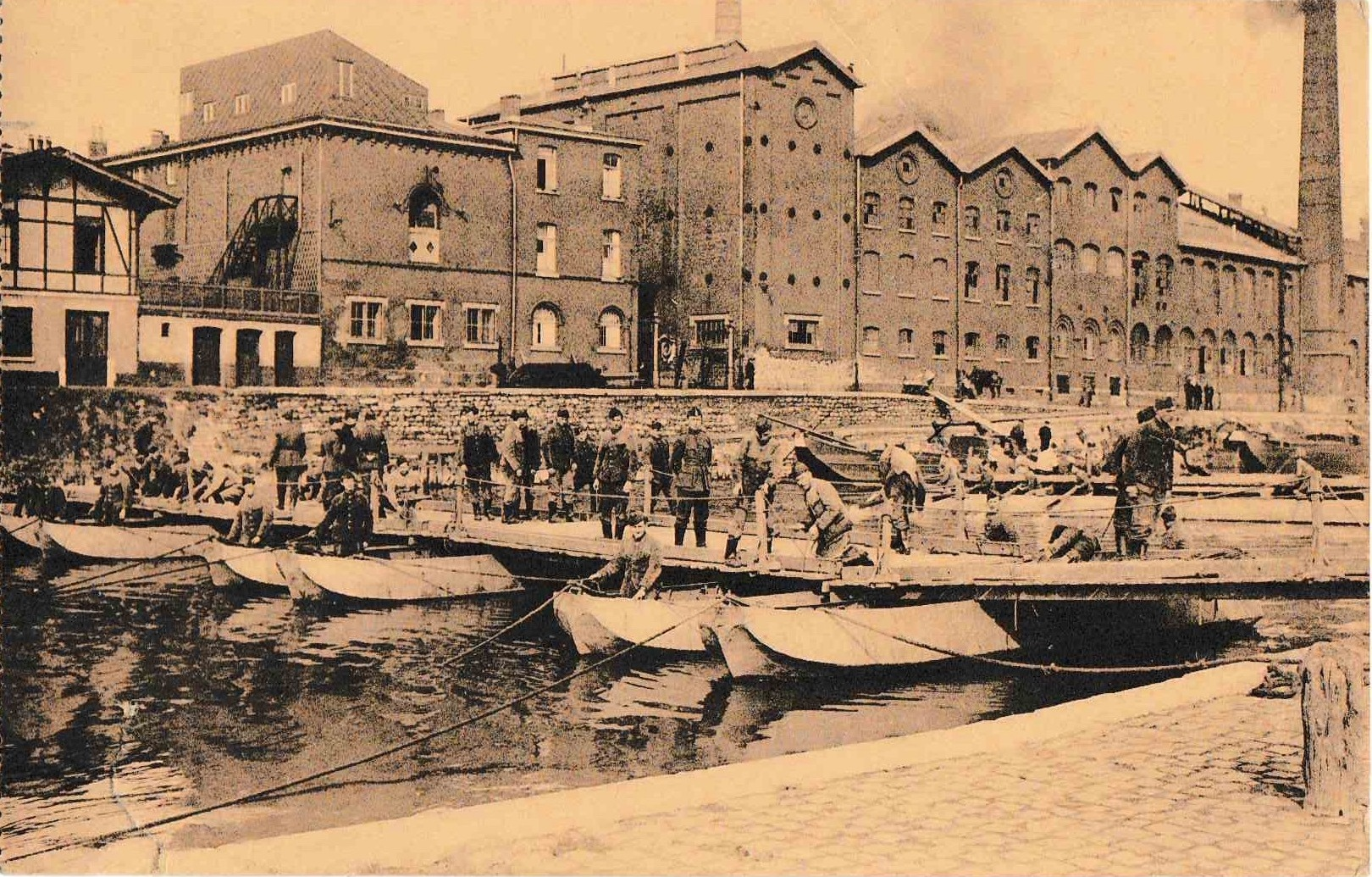
3e régiment du génie (in the French Wikipedia), The 3rd French Regiment of Pioneers are building a Pontoon Bridge, 1930's.
