= Eau Rouge =

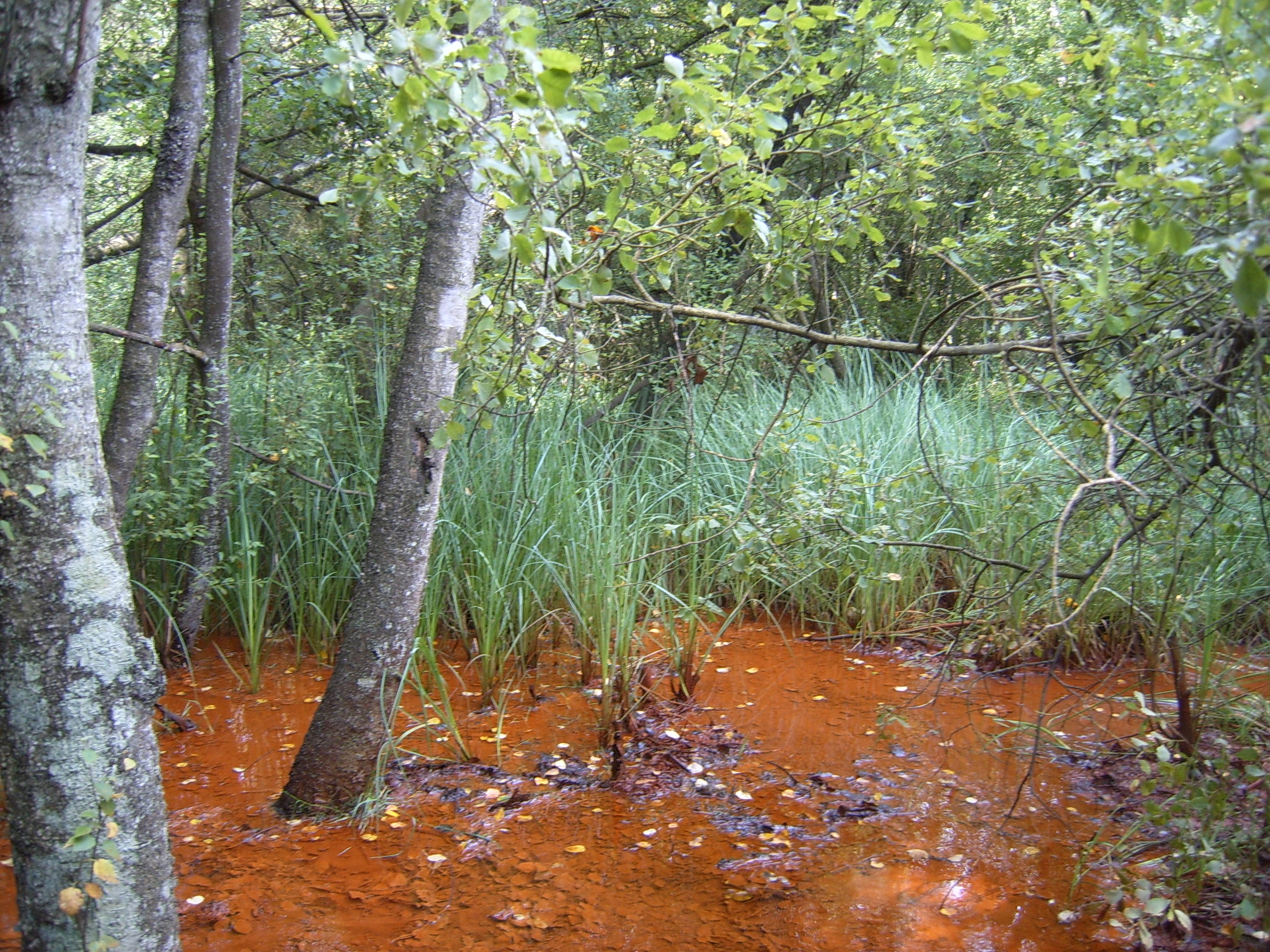
- Red water (eau rouge in French) on the banks of the river

Location
- Country: Belgium
- Province: Liège

Physical characteristics
- Source
  - location: High Fens
- Mouth
  - location: Amblève
  - coordinates: 50.3948°N 5.9464°E
- Length: 15 km (9.3 mi)

Basin features
- Progression: Amblève→ Ourthe→ Meuse→ North Sea

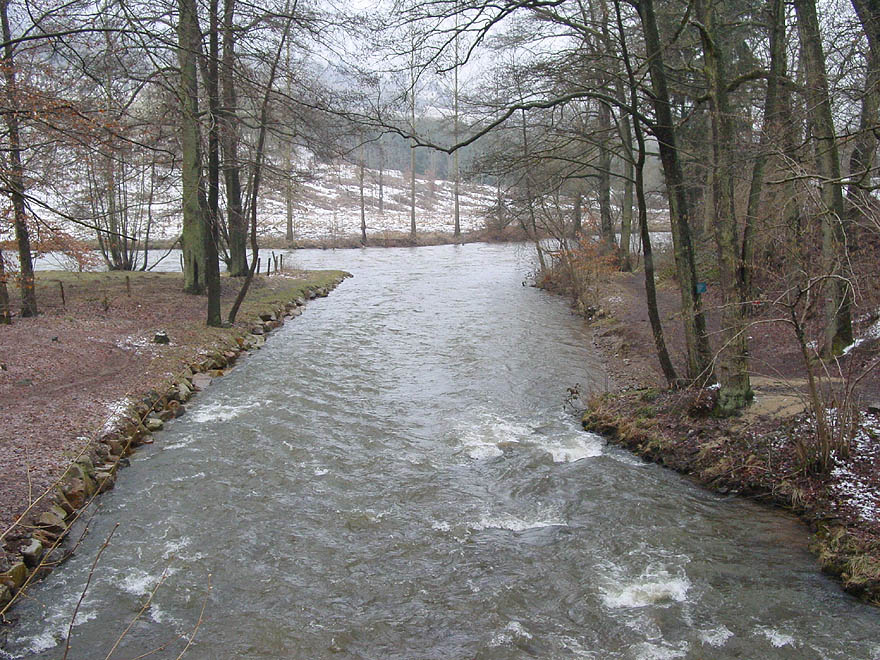
The final stretch of the Eau Rouge, as it joins the river Amblève near Stavelot

The Eau Rouge is a small, 15-kilometre-long (9 mi) stream in the Belgian province of Liège. It is a right tributary of the Amblève.

It starts in the Hautes Fagnes ("High Fens") and ends in Challes, near Stavelot in the river Amblève. The French words eau rouge mean "red water", and the river gets its name from the reddish coloration of the stones and riverbed due to the presence of iron-oxide deposits. The Eau Rouge is particularly geomorphologically interesting, as it appears to be using the old Warche river stream bed.

The Eau Rouge has been a border river for several periods in its existence, including an administrative boundary under the Roman Empire between Cologne and Tongeren, and the state border between the Netherlands and Prussia from 1815 to 1839 and then between Belgium and Prussia from 1839 to 1919.

== Eau Rouge and the F1 circuit ==
The Eau Rouge has lent its name to the Raidillon de l'Eau Rouge corner, one of the best-known corners in Formula One race tracks in the Circuit de Spa-Francorchamps motor racing circuit, at the point where the track crosses it for the first time.

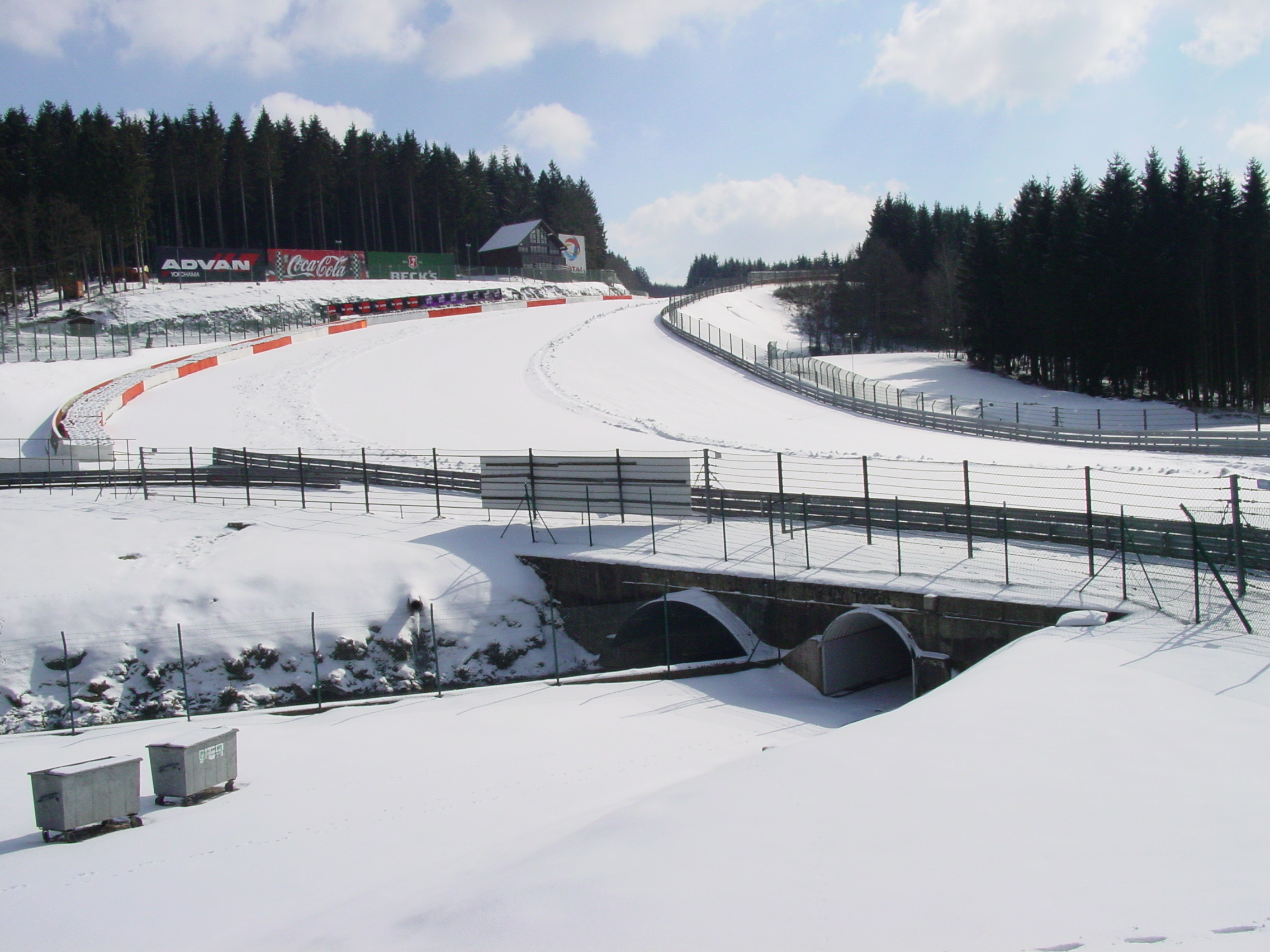
The bridge where the Circuit de Spa-Francorchamps crosses the Eau Rouge stream is located at the corner bearing its name. The right-hand turn visible in the background leading up the hill is Raidillon.

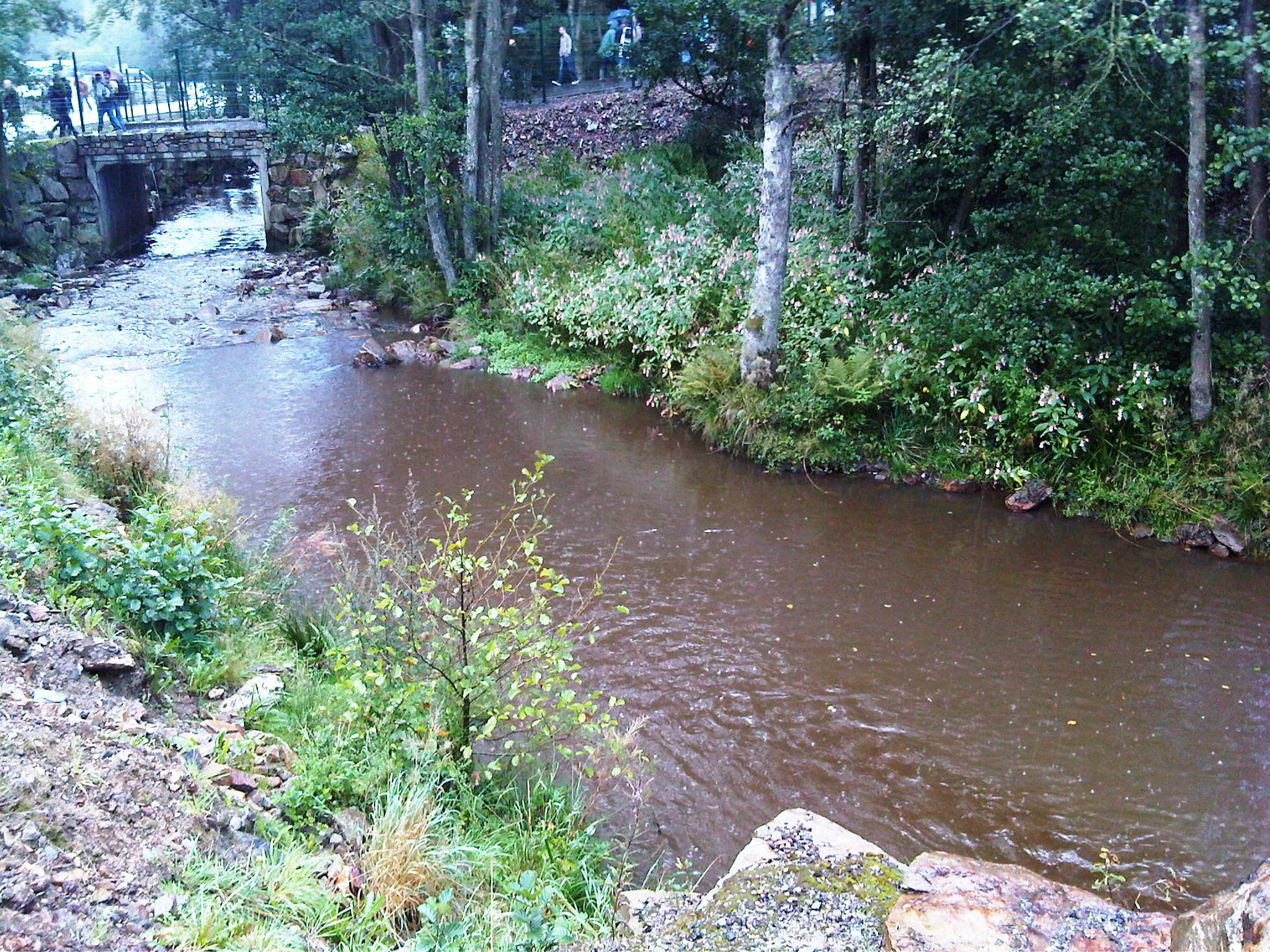
The Eau Rouge river as it passes the interior of the Circuit de Spa-Francorchamps, close to the pit complex
