= Poulseur =

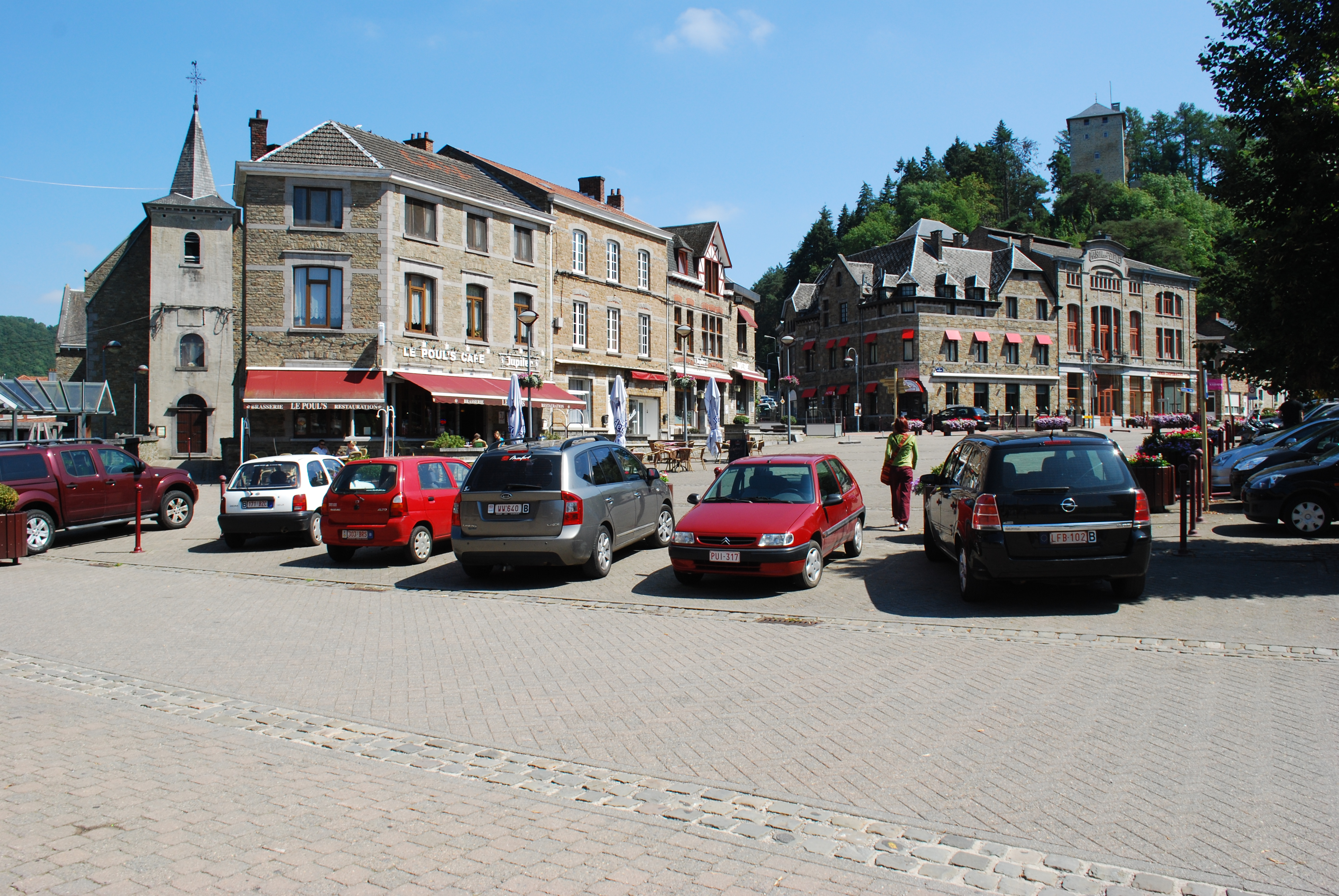
- Poulseur, town centre

- Location within Belgium Location within Europe
- Coordinates: 50°30′30″N 05°34′49″E
- Country: Belgium
- Region: Wallonia
- Province: Liège
- Municipality: Comblain-au-Pont

Poulseur is a town and district of the municipality of Comblain-au-Pont, located in the province of Liège in Wallonia, Belgium.

The area has been settled since pre-historic times; the first written mention of Poulseur dates from 1090 and concerns the consecration of a chapel. During the Middle Ages it was part of the land of the Princely Abbey of Stavelot-Malmedy and contained a mint where gold coins were struck for the Prince-Abbot. In 1855 Poulseur became a municipality. On 4-5 August 1944, during World War II, the centre of Poulseur was burnt by German troops in an act of revenge after German troops had been attacked in the area.
