= Ernonheid =

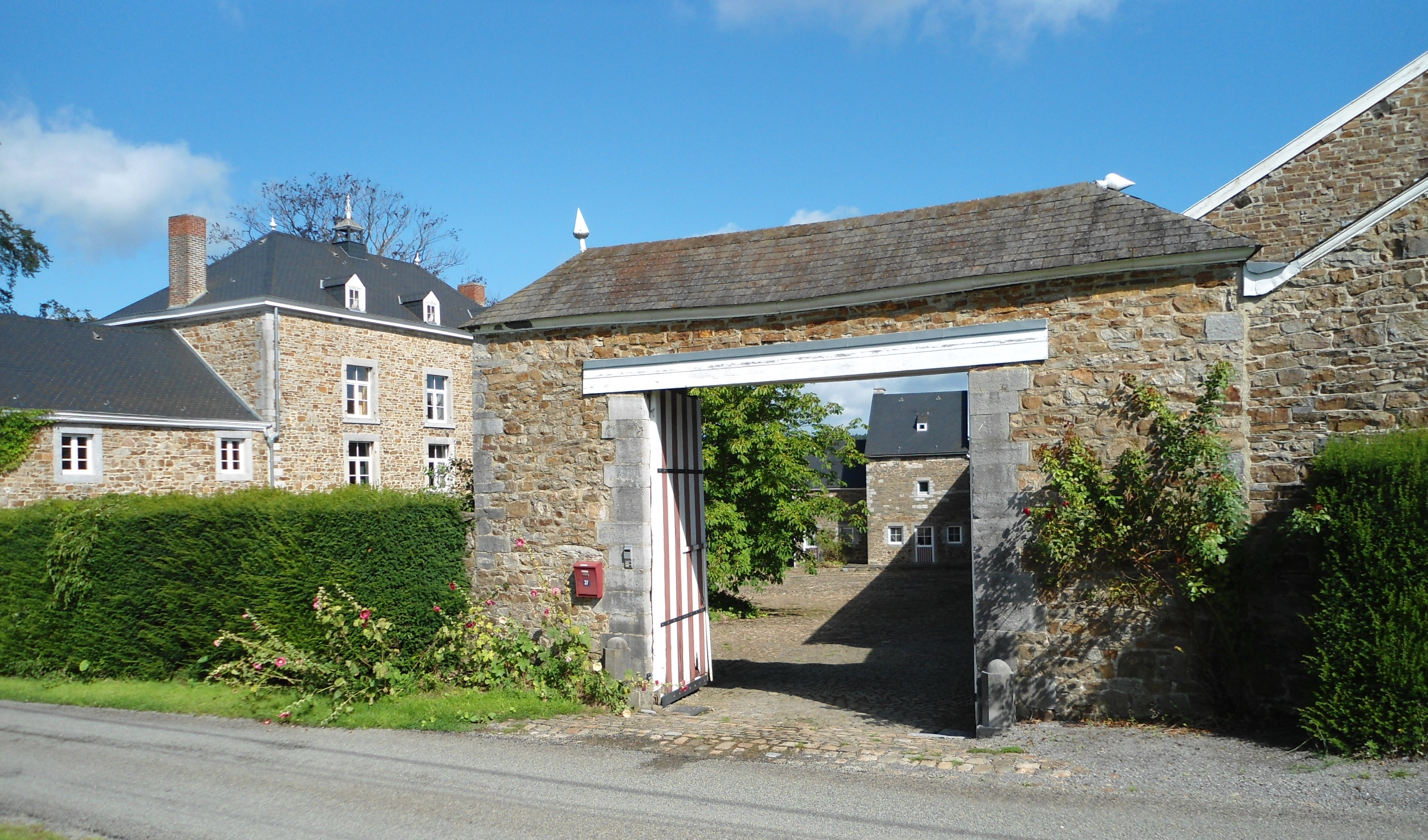
- Ernonheid, the château-ferme of Faweux

- Location within Belgium Location within Europe
- Coordinates: 50°24′14″N 05°40′00″E
- Country: Belgium
- Region: Wallonia
- Province: Liège
- Municipality: Aywaille

Ernonheid is a village and district of the municipality of Aywaille, located in the province of Liège in Wallonia, Belgium.

The development of the village was connected with the early development of metalworking in the area, that began in the 15th century. In 1666 a chapel was established in Ernonheid, which was replaced with a church in 1739. During the reign of King Leopold I of Belgium, a school was established and the church renovated. It was rebuilt after World War I, when the village was burnt by German troops with the loss of one civilian life. Around 1 kilometre (0.62 mi) outside the village, in the halmet of Faweux, there is a historical fortified estate (château-ferme).
