= List of protected heritage sites in Comblain-au-Pont =

This table shows an overview of the protected heritage sites in the Walloon town Comblain-au-Pont. This list is part of Belgium's national heritage.

Object	Year/architect	Town/section	Address	Coordinates	Number^{?}	Image
Tower of the church of St. Martin ^{(nl)} ^{(fr)}		Comblain-au-Pont		50.476272°N 5.574608°E	62026-CLT-0001-01	Toren van de oude kerk Saint-Martin van Comblain-Au-Pont More images
de la Roche Noire site ^{(nl)} ^{(fr)}		Comblain-au-Pont		50.482247°N 5.578945°E	62026-CLT-0003-01	Site "de la Roche Noire"
de la Roche Noire site (extension) ^{(nl)} ^{(fr)}		Comblain-au-Pont		50.481561°N 5.574924°E	62026-CLT-0004-01	Uitbreiding van de site "de la Roche Noire"
Thier Pirard Rocks ^{(nl)} ^{(fr)}		Comblain-au-Pont		50.473828°N 5.585674°E	62026-CLT-0005-01	Rotsen "Thier Pirard"
Chession Rocks ^{(nl)} ^{(fr)}		Comblain-au-Pont		50.480894°N 5.577169°E	62026-CLT-0006-01	Rotsen "Chession"
Les Tartines Rocks ^{(nl)} ^{(fr)}		Comblain-au-Pont		50.479367°N 5.592832°E	62026-CLT-0007-01	Rotsen Les Tartines
Old presbytery, today Museum of Folklore and Ethnography ^{(nl)} ^{(fr)}		Comblain-au-Pont	place Leblanc, n°1	50.475260°N 5.574557°E	62026-CLT-0008-01	Oude pastorie, tegenwoordig museum van Folklore en etnografie
Hé Leruth Rocks ^{(nl)} ^{(fr)}		Comblain-au-Pont		50.473820°N 5.587218°E	62026-CLT-0009-01	
Keep of Castle Renastienne ^{(nl)} ^{(fr)}		Comblain-au-Pont	rue du Vieux Château	50.507687°N 5.580422°E	62026-CLT-0011-01	
Peuple de Poulseur House ^{(nl)} ^{(fr)}		Comblain-au-Pont		50.508396°N 5.579327°E	62026-CLT-0013-01	Gevels en daken van het huis du Peuple de Poulseur, en het interieur van de balzaal, de plafonds van de kamers op de begane grond (koffiekamer, lobby en voormalige coopérative), tegels van koffiekamer, eiken vloeren op de eerste verdieping, binnendeuren, trappenhuizen en smeedijzeren leuningen More images
de la Roche Noire site ^{(nl)} ^{(fr)}		Comblain-au-Pont		50.482247°N 5.578945°E	62026-PEX-0001-01	Site "de la Roche Noire"
de la Roche Noire site (extension) ^{(nl)} ^{(fr)}		Comblain-au-Pont		50.481561°N 5.574924°E	62026-PEX-0002-01	Uitbreiding van de site "de la Roche Noire"
Thier Pirard Rocks ^{(nl)} ^{(fr)}		Comblain-au-Pont		50.473828°N 5.585674°E	62026-PEX-0003-01	De roten Their Pirard
Chession Rocks ^{(nl)} ^{(fr)}		Comblain-au-Pont		50.480894°N 5.577169°E	62026-PEX-0004-01	De rotsen "Chession" More images
Les Tartines Rocks ^{(nl)} ^{(fr)}		Comblain-au-Pont		50.479367°N 5.592832°E	62026-PEX-0005-01	De rotsen Les Tartines More images

== See also ==
- List of protected heritage sites in Liège (province)
