= Nonceveux =

Village in Liège Province, Belgium

- Coordinates: 50.468°N 5.731°E
- Country: Belgium
- Region: Wallonia
- Province: Liège
- Municipality: Aywaille

Nonceveux (French pronunciation: [nɔ̃svø]) is a village of Wallonia in the municipality of Aywaille, district of Sougné-Remouchamps, located in the province of Liège, Belgium.

== Geography ==
The village is situated inside a meander of the Amblève. Nonceveux is located on the left bank, six kilometres south-east and upstream of Sougné-Remouchamps.

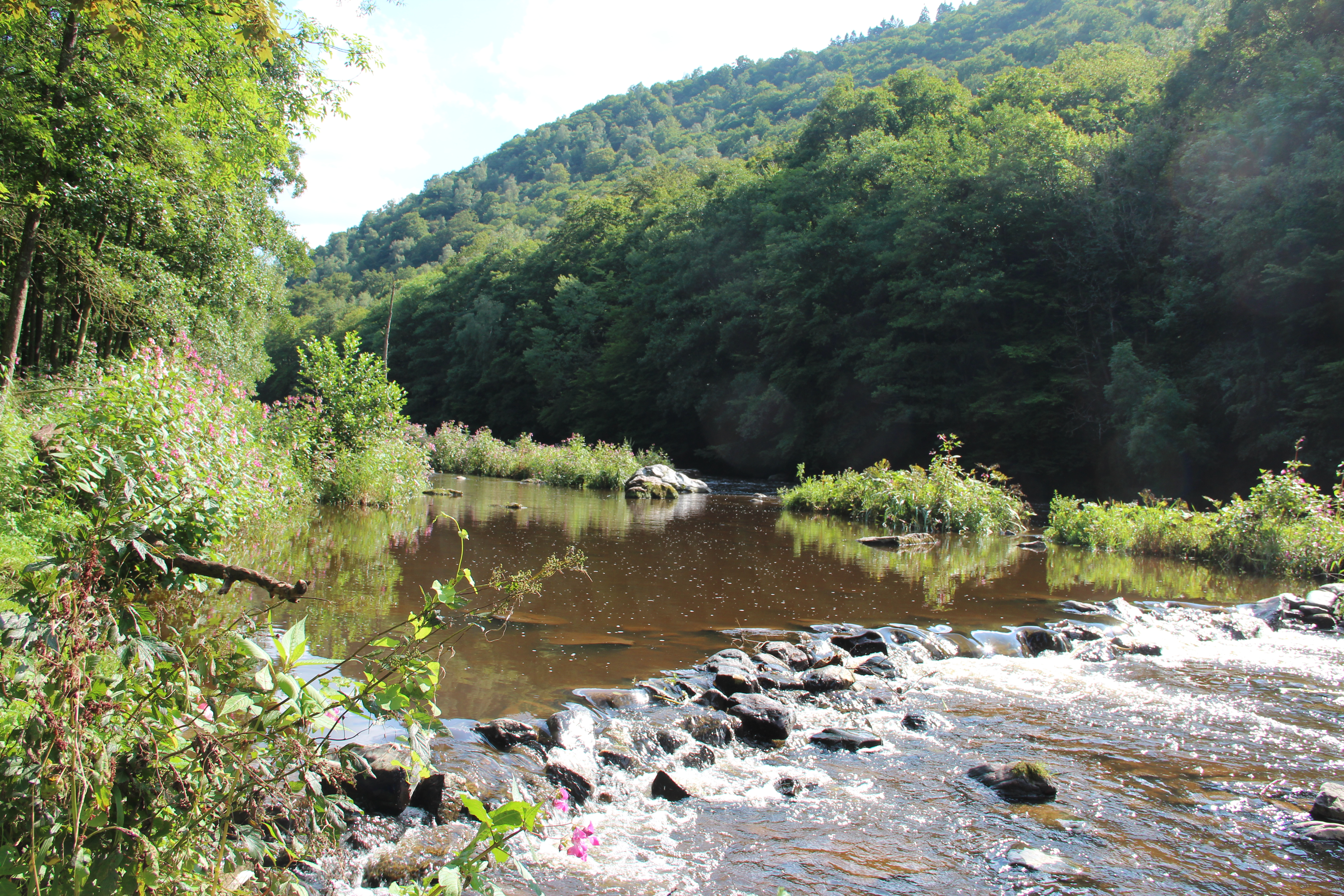
The Amblève at its exit from Fonds de Quarreux

Nonceveux has a nature and wildlife area with hiking trails, called Vallee du Ninglinspo. There are waterfalls and a walk with a distance of up to 6.0 kilometres (2 hours and 45 minutes walking distance). Another trail, called the Fonds de Quarreux which travels through Nonceveux and is 9.4 kilometres in length (2 hours and 57 minute walking distance). The highest elevation of this trail is 271 metres.

== Description ==
Nonceveux, located in the Ardennes, attracts campers throughout the year. It has several camping grounds, both on the Amblève's left bank near the village, as well as on the right bank, which is more downstream.

The village dates back to the 15th century, when the metallurgical factories were built along its river. A furnace and forge was built by Jean de Playe in 1635 and ran regularly from 1636 to 1661, until it was demolished in 1672. The chapel that became the Saint Teresa of Avila church was built in 1790 and is dedicated to Saint Thérèse d'Avila.

Hiking route GR 571 crosses the village.
