= Comblain-au-Pont =

Municipality in Liège Province, Wallonia, Belgium

Comblain-au-Pont Comblin-å-Pont (Walloon)
- Municipality
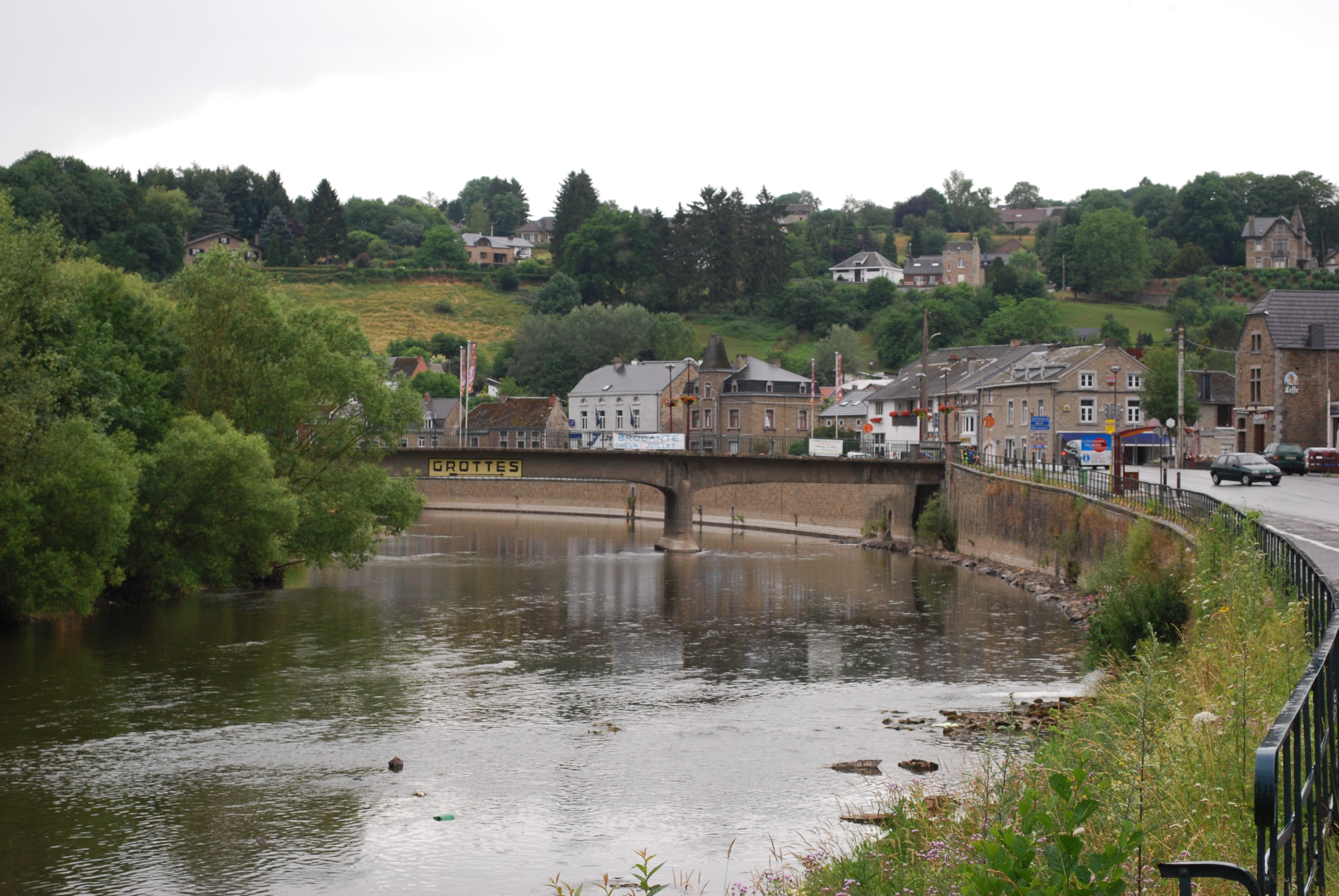

- Location of Comblain-au-Pont in Liège province
- Interactive map of Comblain-au-Pont
- Location in Belgium
- Coordinates: 50°28′N 05°35′E
- Country: Belgium
- Community: French Community
- Region: Wallonia
- Province: Liège
- Arrondissement: Liège

Government
  - Mayor: Jean-Christophe henon (IC)
  - Governing party: IC

Area
  - Total: 22.63 km^{2} (8.74 sq mi)

Population (2018-01-01)
  - Total: 5,381
  - Density: 237.8/km^{2} (615.9/sq mi)
- Postal codes: 4170, 4171
- NIS code: 62026
- Area codes: 04
- Website: www.comblainaupont.be

Comblain-au-Pont (French pronunciation: [kɔ̃blɛ̃ o pɔ̃]; Walloon: Comblin-å-Pont) is a municipality of Wallonia located in the province of Liège, Belgium.

As of 1 January 2014 Comblain-au-Pont had a total population of 6,754. The total area is 22.68 km^{2} which gives a population density of 237 inhabitants per km^{2}. It is situated at the confluence of the rivers Amblève and Ourthe.

The municipality consists of the following districts: Comblain-au-Pont and Poulseur.

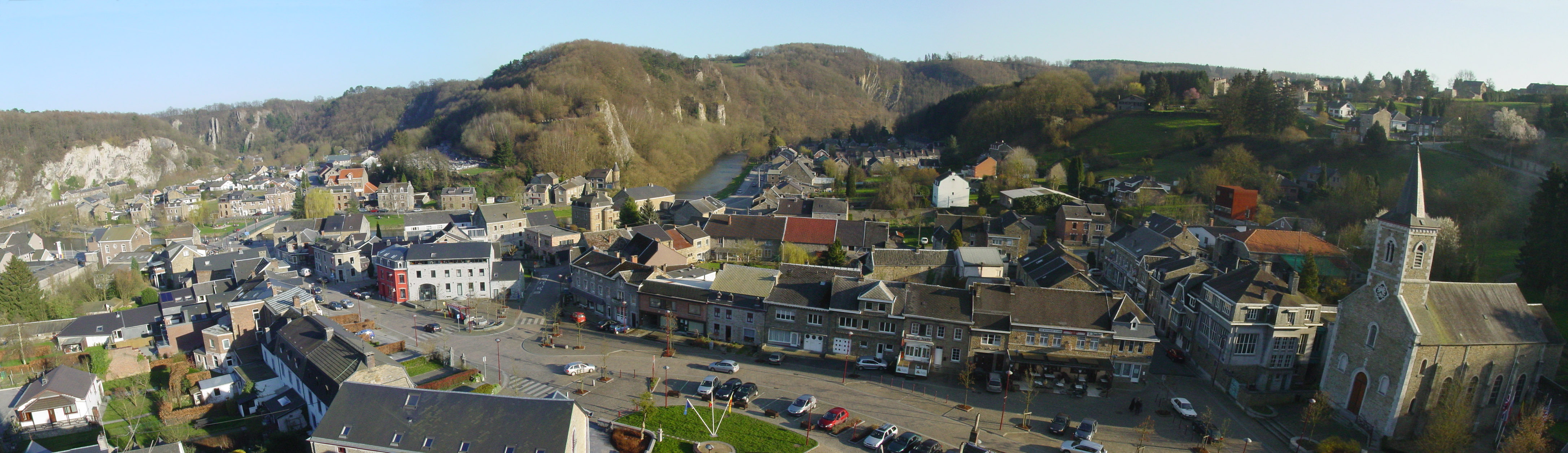
Panorama view of Comblain-au-Pont

== See also ==
- List of protected heritage sites in Comblain-au-Pont
