= Sougné-Remouchamps =

- Château de Montjardin in Sougné-Remouchamps

- Location within Belgium Location within Europe
- Coordinates: 50°28′58″N 05°42′24″E
- Country: Belgium
- Region: Wallonia
- Province: Liège
- Municipality: Aywaille

Sougné-Remouchamps is a district of the municipality of Aywaille, located in the province of Liège in Wallonia, Belgium.

Gallo-Roman remains in the area indicate that it has been settled since pre-Christian times. In the 7th century, it was Christianised. During the Middle Ages, the territory was split between the Prince-Bishopric of Liège, the Duchy of Limburg and the Duchy of Luxembourg. The cave of Remouchamps is located in Sougné-Remouchamps,
