= Cave of Remouchamps =

Natural karst cave in Liège, Belgium

Coordinates: 50.4802°N 5.7121°E

The Cave of Remouchamps is a natural karst cave located in the municipality of Aywaille, Belgium.

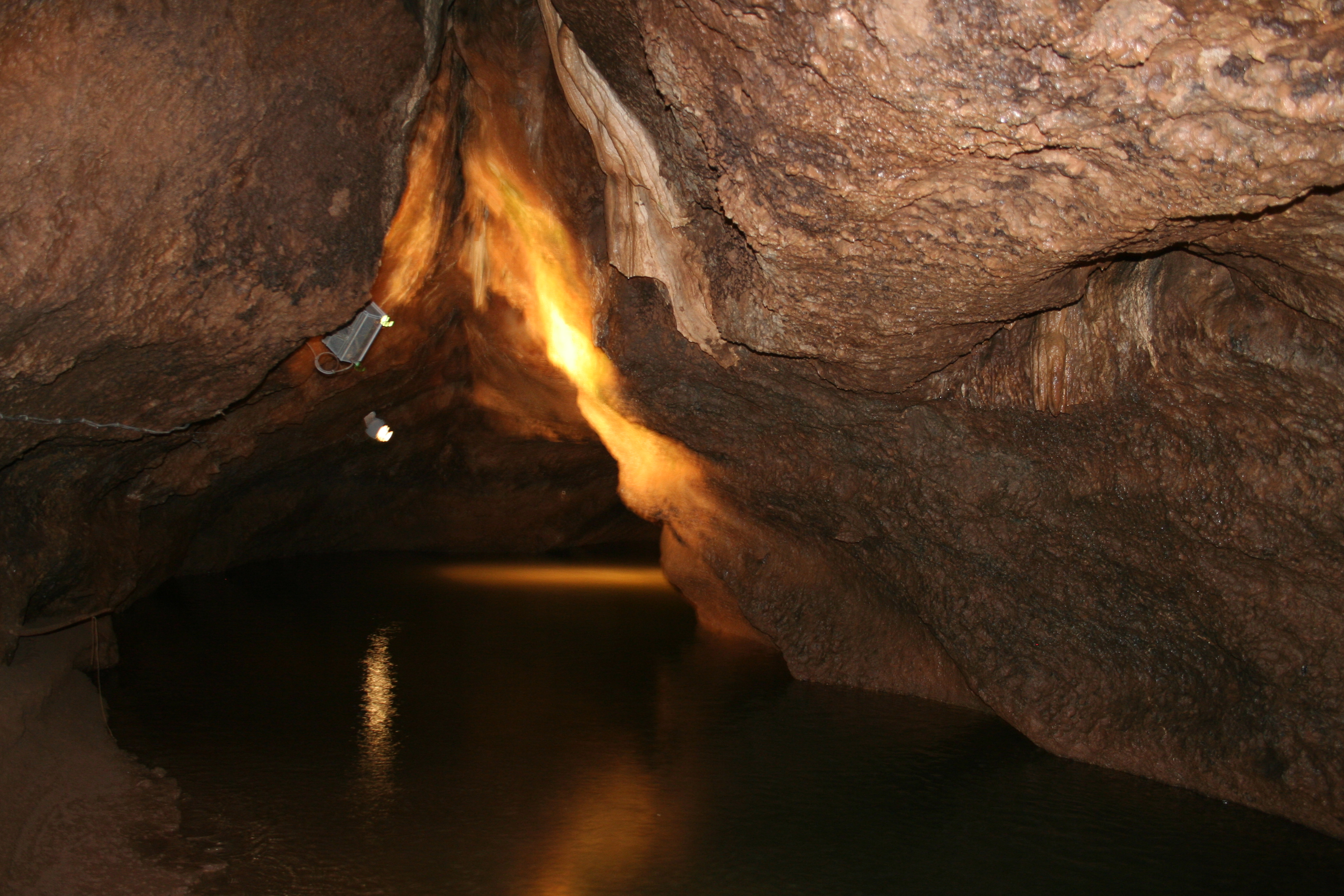
The Rubicon river

== History ==
The first known use of the cave was by Paleolithic hunters, around 8,000 years ago. The cave was rediscovered in 1828 and has been operated as a show cave since 1912. Over this period, it has also served as a wine cellar and air raid shelter, the latter during WW2.

== The cave ==
The cave contains abundant speleothems, including stalactites, stalagmites, and flowstone. One feature is said to resemble the Virgin Mary. The operators of the show cave claim that it contains the world's longest navigable underground river, the Rubicon. This river is around 700 meters long and created the cave as it flowed. Within the river, there are shrimp from the genus Niphargus, along with other crustaceans.
