= Chefna =

Coordinates: 50°27′N 5°44′E

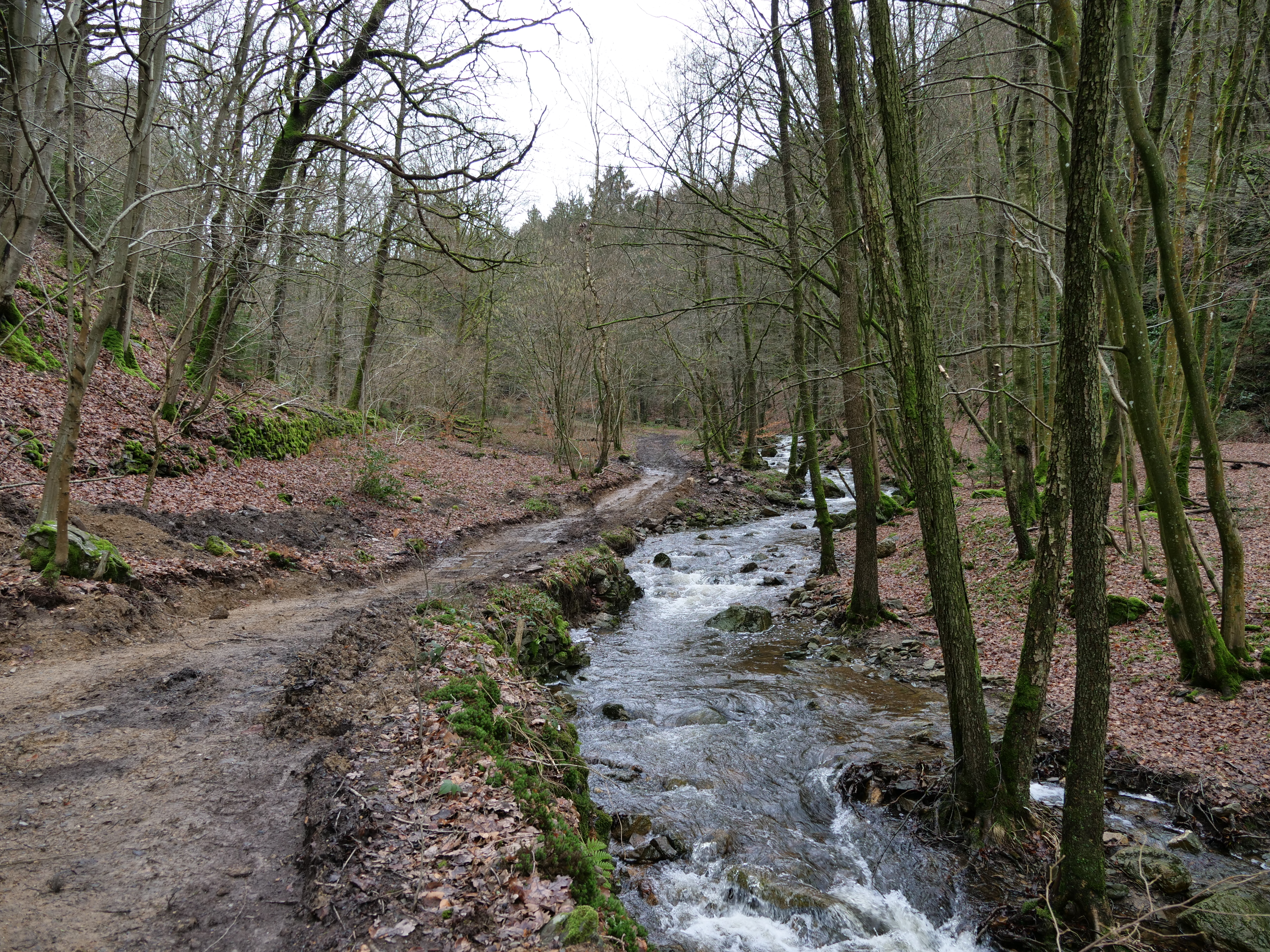

Location
- Country: Belgium

Physical characteristics
- Source
  - location: Liège Province

Chefna is a river of Belgium. It springs in Ville-au-bois and flows for 5 kilometres (3 mi) through the province of Liège, before emptying into the Amblève.

Around 1802, several farmers started looking for gold in the river and on the right bank the pits of a primitive goldmine can be found, although they have been mostly overgrown. The river had a low yield of about 0.40 grams (0.014 oz) of gold per ton of rock, although locals still talk about the man who "almost became a millionnaire" at the end of the 19th century.
