= The Marriage of Mademoiselle Beulemans (1932 film) =

1932 film

- Directed by: Jean Choux
- Written by: Jean François Fonson (play); Fernand Wicheler (play)
- Produced by: René Lafitte; Joseph Reingold
- Cinematography: Robert Batton; Lucien François; René Guichard; Charles Lengnich
- Edited by: Marthe Poncin
- Music by: Philippe Parès
- Production company: Films Reingold-Lafitte
- Distributed by: Films Reingold-Lafitte
- Release date: 2 December 1932
- Countries: Belgium; France
- Language: French

The Marriage of Mademoiselle Beulemans (French: Le mariage de Mlle Beulemans) is a 1932 Belgian-French comedy film directed by Jean Choux. It is based on the 1910 Belgian play Le Mariage de mademoiselle Beulemans. The film's sets were designed by the art director René Moulaert.

== Cast ==
- Pierre Alcover as Monsieur Meulemeester
- Lily Bourget as Suzanne Beulemans
- Berthe Charmal as Madame Beulemans
- Arthur Devère as Isidore
- Pierre Dux as Albert Delpierre
- Zizi Festerat as Mostynck
- André Gobert as Séraphin Meulemeester
- Claire Gérard as Isabelle
- Pierre Juvenet as Père Delpierre
- Charles Mahieu as Monsieur Beulemans
- Solange Moret as Anna
- Ghita Moulaert
- Charles Nossent
- Rittche as Léopold
- René Vitou

== Bibliography ==
- Goble, Alan. The Complete Index to Literary Sources in Film. Walter de Gruyter, 1999.
