= Lucien François =

Belgian lawyer

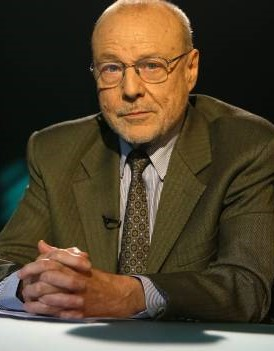

Personal details
- Born: 26 March 1934 (age 92) Chênée, Liège, Belgique, Belgique
- Education: Université de Liège
- Awards: Grand-Croix de l'Ordre de Léopold II; Grand officier de l'Ordre de la Couronne; Commandeur de l’Ordre de Léopold

Lucien François (born 26 March 1934) is a Belgian lawyer.

== Early life ==
Lucien François joined the University of Liège in 1951, earning Doctor of Law (1956) and Doctor of Social Sciences (1963) degrees. He subsequently studied abroad at the Faculties of Law in Paris, Hamburg and Florence.

== Career ==
He taught at the University of Liège (philosophy of law, labour law, criminal law) as associate lecturer (1967), ordinary professor (1970) and extraordinary professor (1985-1999).

He was a temporary member of the Division of International Labour Standards of International Labor Organization (Geneva) (1964-1966), and Member of the Committee of Social Council of Europe (1983-1988).

He was Assistant Chief of staff to Minister of Justice Jean Gol (1982-1985), State Counselor (1985-1989), Judge at the Constitutional Court of Belgium (1989-2004), and Judge Emeritus since 2004.

He has written books on labour law and theory of law, the most important of which is Le cap des tempêtes, Essai de microscopie du droit (The cape of storms, A microscopic examination of the law), first published in 2001. He is the translator in French, with Pierre Gothot, of L'Ordinamento Giuridico of Santi Romano (2nd edition: Paris, Dalloz, 2002).

== Bibliography ==
=== Books ===
- La distinction entre ouvriers et employés en droit allemand, belge, français et italien, Liège, Editions de la Faculté de droit de Liège et, La Haye, Martinus Nijhoff, 1963
- Introduction au droit social, Liège, Editions de la Faculté de droit de Liège, 1974
- Le problème de la définition du droit, Liège, Editions de la Faculté de droit de Liège, 1978
- Théorie des relations collectives du travail en droit belge, Bruxelles, Bruylant, 1980.
- Le cap des Tempêtes, Essai de microscopie du droit, Paris, LGDJ, Bruxelles, Bruylant, 2001; 2e éd., préface de Pierre MAYER, 2012
- Le problème de l’existence de Dieu et autres sources de conflits de valeurs., Bruxelles, Académie Royale de Belgique, Coll. L'Académie en poche, Bruxelles, 2017; préface de Hervé HASQUIN, 2017.

=== Main articles ===
- « La nature juridique du règlement d’atelier, Etude de droit allemand, belge et français », Annales de la Faculté de droit de Liège, 1961, p. 563 à 663;
- « Essai critique sur la notion d’accident du travail », Annales de la Faculté de droit de Liège, 1963, p. 229 à 254;
- « Transformation d’entreprise et cession annexe de personnel », Ann. Fac. dr. Liège, 1964, p. 413 à 441;
- « L’adage Nul ne peut se faire justice à soi-même, en général et sous l’angle particulier du droit du travail », Ann. Fac. dr. Liège, 1967, p. 93 à 133;
- « Les syndicats et la personnalité juridique », Revue critique de jurisprudence belge, 1968, p. 39 à 65;
- « Remarques sur quelques questions de droit pénal social, particulièrement sur l’imputabilité », Revue de droit pénal et de criminologie, 1969, p. 489 à 518;
- « La liberté du travail, en général et comme principe du droit belge », La liberté du travail, Les Congrès et colloques de l’Université de Liège, vol. 53,1969, p. 115 158;
- « L’accident du travail ou les vicissitudes d’une définition juridique », Journal des tribunaux du travail, 1972, p. 193 et suiv.;
- « Faut-il supprimer les examens universitaires, les perfectionner ou seulement les ritualiser ? », Revue universitaire de Liège, 1974-1975, 35 p.;
- « L’égalité en droit social », Trav. du Centre de philosophie du droit de l’Université Libre de Bruxelles, vol. 5 L’égalité, p. 131 et suiv.;
- « Un système d’élections, pour régler sans arbitraire la participation des syndicats au pouvoir », A l’enseigne du droit social belge, 3e éd. augmentée, éd. Revue Université Bruxelles, 1982, p. 383 et suiv.;
- « Implications du delinquere sed non puniri potest, Mélanges Robert Legros, éd. Univ. Libre de Bruxelles, p. 189 et suiv.;
- « La révolution selon le droit », Le droit sans la Justice, actes d’une rencontre autour du Cap des Tempêtes publiés sous la direction de E. Deruelle et G. Brausch, Bruylant et LGDJ, 2004, p. III et suiv.;
- « Le recours à une philosophie du droit dans la motivation de décisions juridictionnelles », Journal des Tribunaux, Bruxelles, 2005, p. 262 et suiv.

A more general bibliography is available on the depository of texts of the University of Liège (accès libre).

== Cape of Storms, Essay in Law Microscopy ==
=== Synopsis ===
The work applies an analytical approach to addressing issues that the philosophy and sociology of law deal with most often as a global vision of complex realities. The author describes an element common to the juridical phenomenon. For this basic building block or elementary particle he has coined the term "jureme". He explores the various positions, transformations and combinations of the jureme. He hypothesizes that a microscopic examination allows the fitting of their diversity of structures and forms, with a basic similarity of composition. The methodology employs the radical distinction between what is (effective rule) and what should be (fair rule) as well as the constant concern to isolate and to make apparent what, in the way the law is expressed, tends to show it in its best light ("nimbe").

=== Analysis ===
The title refers to an expression used by Italian philosopher Norberto Bobbio. Lucien François attempts to characterize the difference between a law and an ultimatum from for example, a bandit demanding "your money or your life !"

One possible claim is that by its nature, law cannot stray from justice. Rejecting this claim by acknowledging the law's defects requires a substitute, thus the title.

Lucien François suggests that such an analysis requires a "microscopic" method, proceeding from the simple to the complex. He starts by describing minutely the smallest specific legal element and then shows how this irreducible particle allows, through a series of transformations and combinations, the composition of any legal phenomenon.

The book’s starting point is that the State and the law are readily spoken about without precise definitions. Such definitions are critical because legal science is dogged by a persistent vagueness in its aims. This uncertainty extends to the notion of legal rules and legal norms.

He crafts a new vocabulary for discussing law, seeking abstraction and precision, in attempt to avoid the imprecision of conventional terms. The most important new term is "jureme", referring to the smallest component of any legal phenomenon (replacing "legal norm"), adapting linguistics' phoneme. Franc claims that the term legal norm is a jumble of quotations from the statute book and statements combining statutes and court rulings, a hotch potch of preliminary messages and final injunctions, of permanent or temporary, general or particular requirements. Jureme is defined as: « Any appearance, produced by a human being, of a wish to obtain a certain behavioural response in another human being, appearance which is equipped with a mechanism such that as soon as one of the addressees resists, pressure by the threat of a sanction is exerted in the opposite direction ».

He asserts that conventional legal language was developed for pragmatic purposes rather than in the service of science, for convenience rather than formal clarity.

Jurists express themselves with conventional language to mirror the rules and communicate with those who formulate them rather than the way in which this language is perceived by the addressees. François highlights at each stage of his progression the processes that form what he calls the "nimbe" (aura). This is the image that power projects of itself and of its will in an effort to persuade by its choice of words and artifices.

At the beginning of this progression, he presents a brief encounter containing only an order backed up by a threat. At the end of this progression he shows how the modern State and of international coexistence come into play. Each chapter tackles one step and analyses its mechanisms and possible improvements. François is convinced that legal theoreticians miss many points – as in many law books – if they begin their study of the huge and complex building blocks that States constitute with a prematurely synthetic approach. This kind of study might mislead because does not sufficiently avoid preconceived ideas.

Some legal systems contrast law and fact: for example, they distinguish between legal and factual powers, powers de jure as opposed to powers de facto. By so doing they show that they have a greater regard for the former than for the latter. This way of looking at the law may give the impression that the law lies somewhere else than in the realm of facts. François constructs the increasingly complicated structures of juridical systems from facts alone.

The book's first part, Prolégomènes, consists of seven short chapters in which the author claims that concepts commonly used in the so-called theory of law are inadequate and concludes that it is best not to use the term "law" at all.

In the third part, entitled Epilogue, François reconsiders his approach and summarizes what has been achieved.

The second part is the book's core, titled Exercice sur le jurème. Its main title By Agreement or by Force encapsulates the essential way in which law works. In the eighth chapter the author constructs his concept of the jureme. These elements appear in their simplest form in chapter 9, Brief Encounters between Two People, which deals with the basic occurrences of the jureme, where the essential characteristics of what the author calls « the notification system » become apparent. In chapter 10, the jureme is examined in lasting relationships. This introduction of relative permanence complicates the notification system. He groups juremes in families. These « archemes » play an essential role. Chapter 11 introduces multiple subjects/addressees and further complicates the notification system. Chapter 12 extends the jurème through « capacitation ». Chapter 13 requires the longest developments discussing the cooperation between non-delegated powers, under a great variety of forms, from people waiting in line to organizations functioning on a hierarchical basis. Chapter 14 adds one more element that is required to create an embryonic juridical State system, namely, the « jureme of supremacy » emitted by the « dominant aggregate ». Finally, in chapter 15, the developed State and international coexistence appear.

In the course of this progression, the microscopic method throws new light on many legal institutions and constructions, including the legal nature (nature juridique) of things, the notions of legal persona or corporate personality, of nullity, delegation, territory, interpretation, the presumption of legislative rationality, freedoms, revolution, coup d’Etat and the role of judges. One of the most difficult issues is to know whether imperatives can exist without an (identifiable) imperator.

François began each chapter in this part with one or more anecdotes that illustrate his points. These portray imaginary factual situations pertaining to practical cases.

=== Reception ===
At a university symposium on this book, the author was introduced as someone who " lifts the veil, debunks fictions, dismantles artifices in order to get to the bottom of real relationships of power" (E. Delruelle). In the last years of a long legal career, Lucien François has thought long and hard about this work, which critics have judged " highly original" (F. Glansdorff), "of rare lucidity " (D. Piérard), endeavouring to "provide us with an analytical grid of how people in authority behave" (P. Martens); an "astringent" text displaying "implacable rigour" (J.-M. Belorgey), "a far-reaching and exacting reflection tied up with the ambition of formulating a global explanatory approach to legal phenomena" in a legal theory too often willing to welcome " fast thinkers" (N. Thirion), an "exercise in demystification of the law by the law", crucial " in any debate on law and justice, for any future appreciation of the norm and its legitimacy" and useful "as much for law professors as for legal sociologists, anthropologists and law historians, because it represents a rigorous tool of analysis that poses pertinent questions while systematically answering them" (S. Cacciaguidi-Fahy); "The language of law was not universal; by redefining its legal field it becomes universal. Now the legal sciences are equipped with a conceptual apparatus which enables the analysis of any human society" (R. Jacob); "a formidable power of persuasion "(P. Mayer); "Lucien François goes beyond appearances" (P. Brunet)

== Recognition ==
- Grand Cross Order of Leopold II.
- Grand officier de l'Ordre de la Couronne.
- Commandeur de l’Ordre de Léopold.
