= Lienne =

Coordinates: 50°25′N 5°47′E

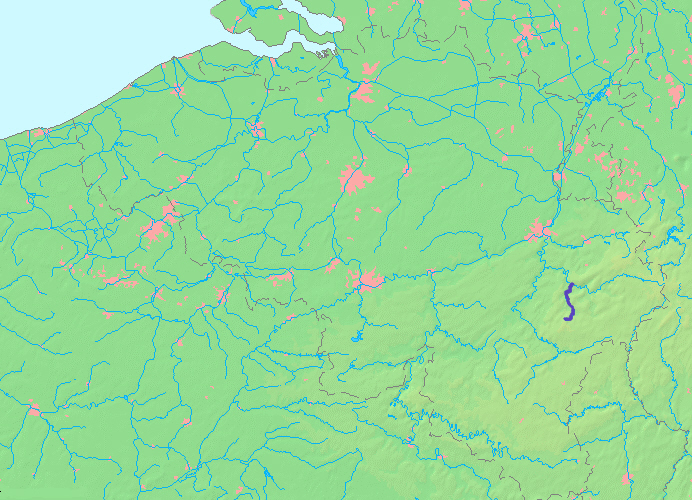

Location
- Country: Belgium

Physical characteristics
- Source
  - location: Liège Province

Lienne is a river in Belgium. It flows for 28 kilometres (17 mi) through the province of Liège in the northern-central part of the country.
