= List of protected heritage sites in Aywaille =

This table shows an overview of the protected heritage sites in the Walloon town Aywaille. This list is part of Belgium's national heritage. Aywaille

Object	Year/architect	Town/section	Address	Coordinates	Number^{?}	Image
Old quarry Chambralles ^{(nl)} ^{(fr)}		Aywaille		50.476681°N 5.635885°E	62009-CLT-0002-01 Info	Oude groeve van Chambralles
Site of the Saints-Anges church and the surrounding area including the old cemetery and the square before the church, the linden trees, the beech and the pump ^{(nl)} ^{(fr)}		Aywaille	Dieupart-sous-Aywaille	50.476052°N 5.688736°E	62009-CLT-0003-01 Info	Site van de kerk Saints-Anges en de omgeving waaronder de oude begraafplaats en het plein voor de kerk, de lindebomen, de beuk en de pomp
Chapel of Sainte-Anne Pouhon ^{(nl)} ^{(fr)}		Aywaille	Harzé	50.420308°N 5.665715°E	62009-CLT-0004-01 Info	Kapel Sainte-Anne van Pouhon
Church Saints-Anges ^{(nl)} ^{(fr)}		Aywaille	Dieupart-sous-Aywaille	50.475398°N 5.687891°E	62009-CLT-0005-01 Info	Kerk Saints-Anges
Castle Harzé and the esplanade, the courtyard, outbuildings and the old cemetery in the park around the site of the old church ^{(nl)} ^{(fr)}		Aywaille		50.441325°N 5.666457°E	62009-CLT-0006-01 Info	Kasteel van Harzé en het ensemble van het kasteel, de esplanade, de binnenplaats, de bijgebouwen en het park met oude begraafplaats rond de plaats van de oude kerk More images
Tower from the 14th century church of Notre-Dame and Saint-Martin ^{(nl)} ^{(fr)}		Aywaille	Sougné-Remouchamps	50.482391°N 5.705801°E	62009-CLT-0008-01 Info	
Valley of the Ninglinspo ^{(nl)} ^{(fr)}		Aywaille	Sougné-Remouchamps	50.468467°N 5.744252°E	62009-CLT-0009-01 Info	Vallei van Ninglinspo More images
Fonds de Quarreux ^{(nl)} ^{(fr)}		Aywaille	Sougné-Remouchamps	50.451328°N 5.739948°E	62009-CLT-0010-01 Info	Ensemble van de Fonds de Quarreux More images
Fonds de Quarreux surroundings ^{(nl)} ^{(fr)}		Aywaille	Aywaille	50.430472°N 5.727693°E	62009-CLT-0011-01 Info	Tereinen van de Fonds de Quarreux
House ^{(nl)} ^{(fr)}		Aywaille	Deigné	50.507789°N 5.730400°E	62009-CLT-0013-01 Info	
Lane of red beech trees ^{(nl)} ^{(fr)}		Aywaille	Dieupart	50.476281°N 5.689206°E	62009-CLT-0016-01 Info	
Awan Village ^{(nl)} ^{(fr)}		Aywaille		50.459299°N 5.644749°E	62009-CLT-0017-01 Info	Dorp van Awan
Chapel of Sainte-Anne du Pouhon and its surroundings ^{(nl)} ^{(fr)}		Aywaille	Harzé	50.419113°N 5.663298°E	62009-CLT-0018-01 Info	Ensemble van de kapel Sainte-Anne du Pouhon en diens omgeving
Castle Remouchamps ^{(nl)} ^{(fr)}		Aywaille	route de Remouchamps	50.478064°N 5.689565°E	62009-CLT-0019-01 Info	Kasteel: gevels en daken More images
Linden trees ^{(nl)} ^{(fr)}		Aywaille	Place de Deigne	50.506655°N 5.729521°E	62009-CLT-0021-01 Info	Lindebomen op het place de Deigne More images
House ^{(nl)} ^{(fr)}		Aywaille	n°14, Deigné	50.507957°N 5.730251°E	62009-CLT-0022-01 Info	
Site of Grotte de Remouchamps ^{(nl)} ^{(fr)}		Aywaille		50.480130°N 5.711766°E	62009-CLT-0023-01 Info	Site van de Grotten van Remouchamps en omgeving
Grottes de Remouchamps & chantoir de Sécheval ^{(nl)} ^{(fr)}		Aywaille		50.485852°N 5.719374°E	62009-CLT-0024-01 Info	
Chantoir de Sécheval ^{(nl)} ^{(fr)}		Aywaille	Sougné-Remouchamps	50.489380°N 5.718511°E	62009-CLT-0025-01 Info	Chantoir de Sécheval
"Heid des Gattes" ^{(nl)} ^{(fr)}		Aywaille		50.480066°N 5.692060°E	62009-CLT-0030-01 Info	Ensemble van "Heid des Gattes"
Amblève castle ruins ^{(nl)} ^{(fr)}		Aywaille		50.479930°N 5.645193°E	62009-CLT-0031-01 Info	Ensemble van de ruïnes van het kasteel van Amblève en zijn directe omgeving
Valley of the Ninglinspo ^{(nl)} ^{(fr)}		Aywaille	Sougné-Remouchamps	50.468467°N 5.744252°E	62009-PEX-0001-01 Info	Vallei van Ninglinspo
Fonds de Quarreux ^{(nl)} ^{(fr)}		Aywaille	Sougné-Remouchamps	50.451328°N 5.739948°E	62009-PEX-0002-01 Info	Ensemble van de Fonds de Quarreux
Fonds de Quarreux extension ^{(nl)} ^{(fr)}		Aywaille	Aywaille	50.430472°N 5.727693°E	62009-PEX-0003-01 Info	De terreinen die een uitbreiding vormen op de classificatie van de Fonds de Quarreux
Underground part of grottes de Remouchamps (part 1) ^{(nl)} ^{(fr)}		Aywaille		50.480130°N 5.711766°E	62009-PEX-0004-01 Info	Het ondergrondse gedeelte van de site van de grotten van Remouchamps (deel 1)
Underground part of grottes de Remouchamps (part 2) ^{(nl)} ^{(fr)}		Aywaille		50.485852°N 5.719374°E	62009-PEX-0005-01 Info	Het ondergrondse gedeelte van de site van de grotten van Remouchamps (deel 2)
"Heid des Gattes" ^{(nl)} ^{(fr)}		Aywaille		50.480066°N 5.692060°E	62009-PEX-0006-01 Info	Ensemble van "Heid des Gattes"

== See also ==
- List of protected heritage sites in Liège (province)
