= Aywaille =

Municipality in Liège Province, Wallonia, Belgium

Aywaille: Aiwêye (Walloon)
- Municipality
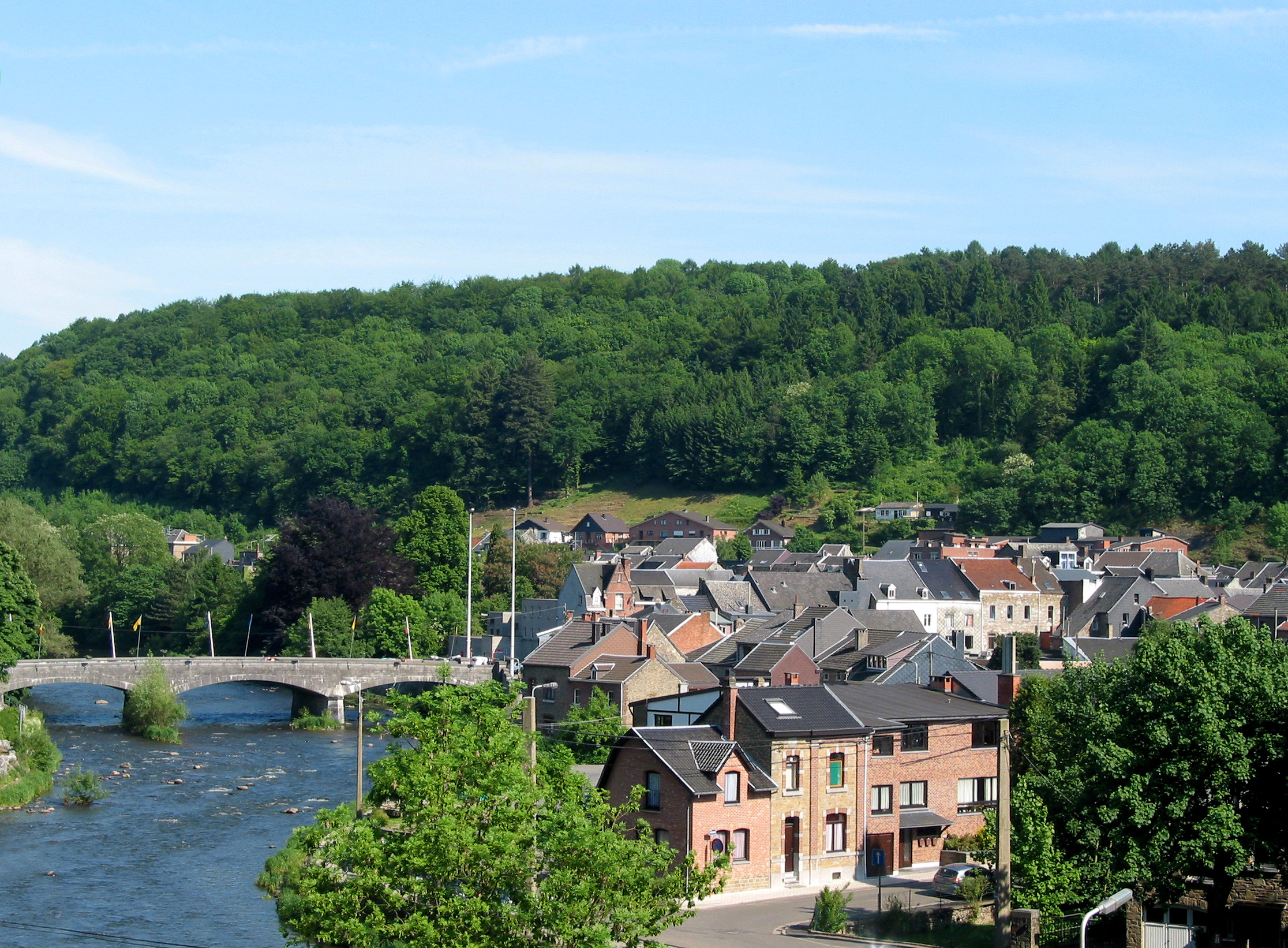
- The Amblève in Aywaille

- Coat of arms

- Location of Aywaille in Liège province
- Interactive map of Aywaille
- Location in Belgium
- Coordinates: 50°28′N 05°40′E
- Country: Belgium
- Community: French Community
- Region: Wallonia
- Province: Liège
- Arrondissement: Liège

Government
  - Mayor: Thierry Carpentier

Area
  - Total: 79.92 km^{2} (30.86 sq mi)

Population (2018-01-01)
  - Total: 12,405
  - Density: 155.2/km^{2} (402.0/sq mi)
- Postal codes: 4920
- NIS code: 62009
- Area codes: 04
- Website: www.aywaille.be

Aywaille (French pronunciation: [ɛwaj]; Walloon: Aiwêye) is a municipality of Wallonia located in the province of Liège, Belgium.

On 1 January 2012, Aywaille had a total population of 11,697. The total area is 80.04 km^{2} which gives a population density of 146 inhabitants per km^{2}. Its area consists of 45.7% of wooded and wild country, 29.9% of agricultural areas and 24.4% of built-up areas.

The inhabitants of Aywaille are called the "Aqualiens", from the Latin version of Aywaille "Aqualia loca", which means "area full of water" or "muddy land".

The municipality consists of the following districts: Aywaille, Ernonheid, Harzé, and Sougné-Remouchamps. They include many villages as Aywaille, Awan, Chambralles, Deigné, Ernonheid, Paradis, Houssonloge, Pouhon, Harzé, Havelange, Kin, Stoqueu, Martinrive, Nonceveux, Playe, Quarreux, Sedoz, Septroux, Sougné, Remouchamps, Ville-au-Bois.

== Gallery ==
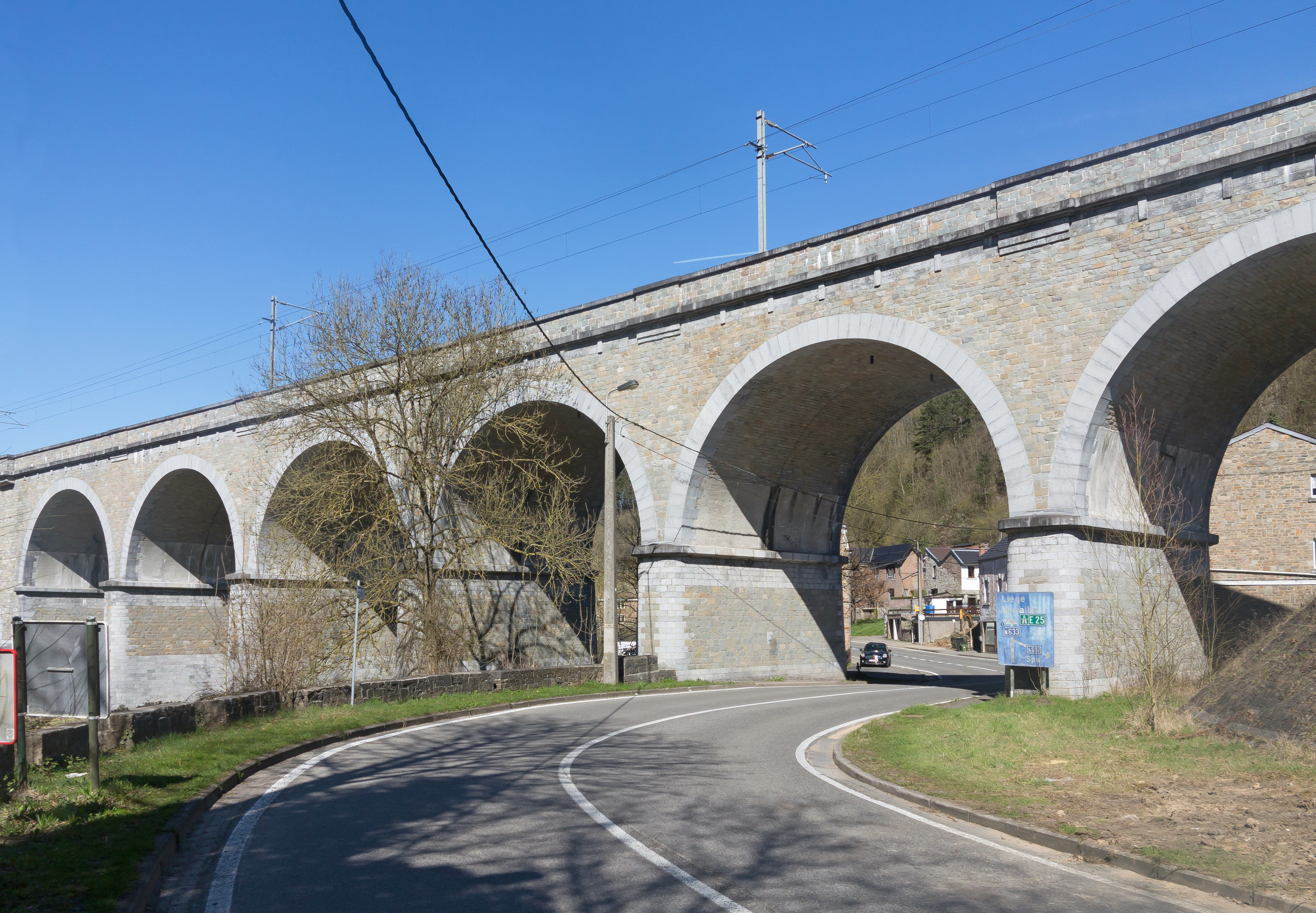
Sougne-Remouchamps, railway bridge across the Rue de Trois Ponts

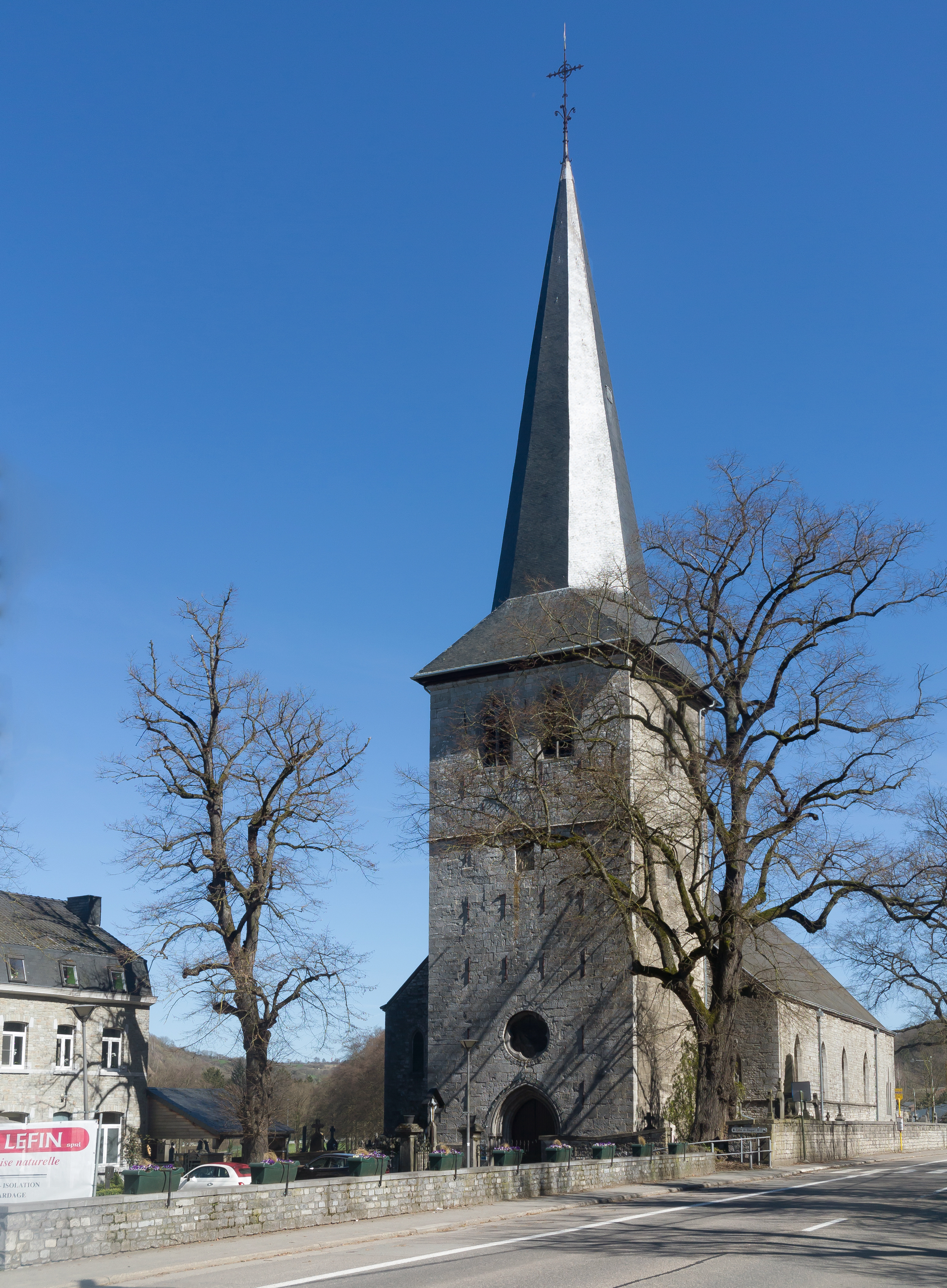
Dieupart, church: l'église des Saints-Anges

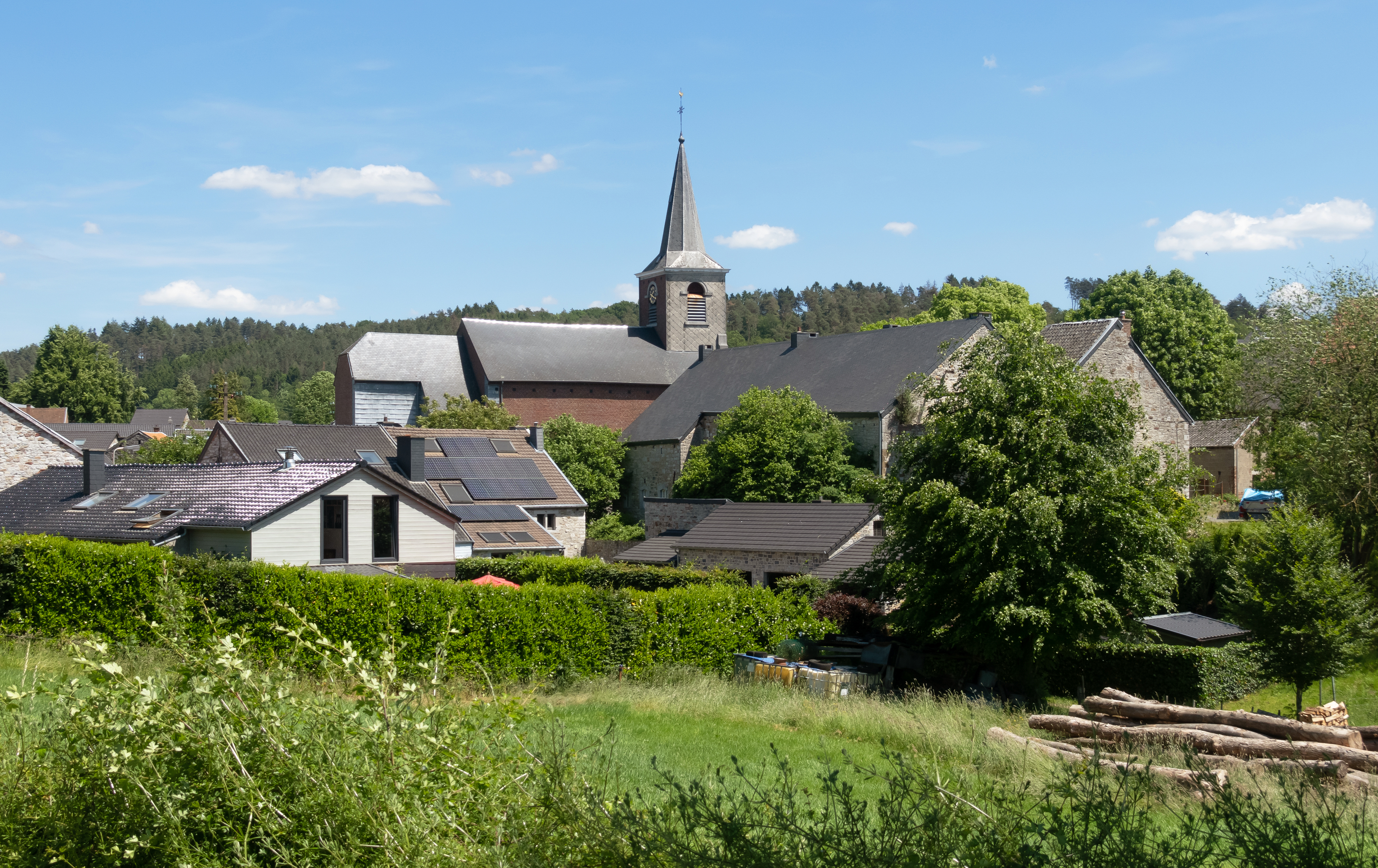
Deigné, church (l'église Saint-Joseph) in the village

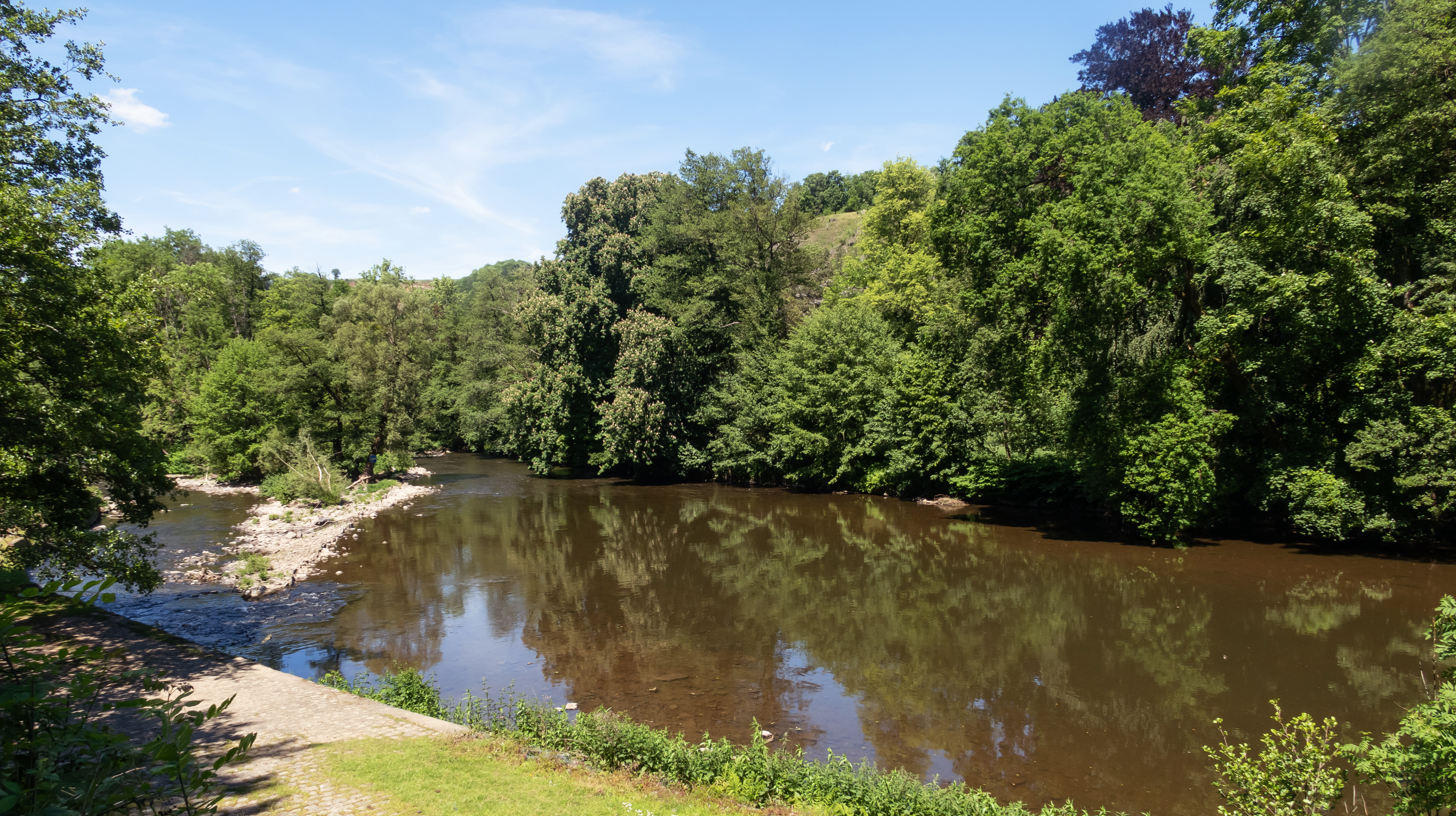
Martinrive, the Amblève

== See also ==
- List of protected heritage sites in Aywaille
