= Passage of the Grande Honnelle =

Military campaign during World War I

- Part of Hundred Days Offensive, World War I
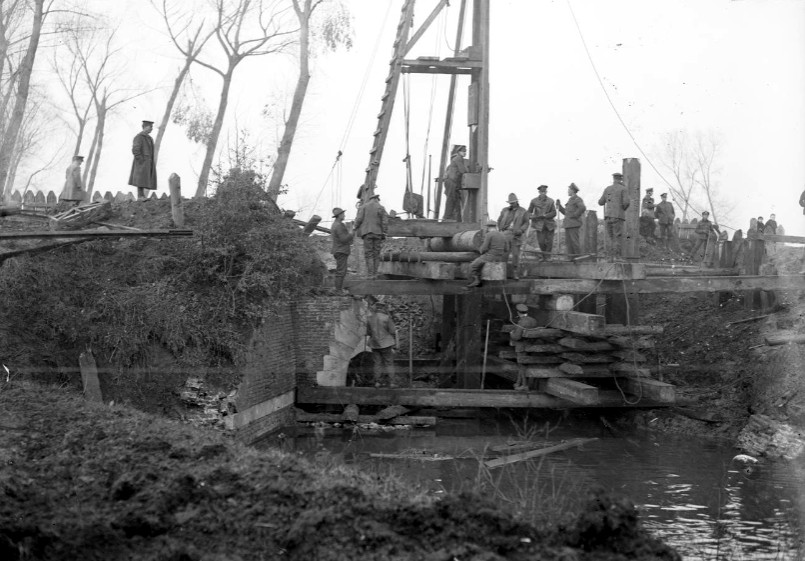
- Bridge over Honnelle River, November 1918.
Date	5–7 November 1918
Location	Honnelles, Hainaut, Belgium 50°22′06″N 03°41′53″E
Result	Allied victory

Belligerents
United Kingdom; Canada	German Empire
- Location within Belgium

The Passage of the Grande Honnelle was a battle between troops of the British First and Third Armies and German Empire forces during the Hundred Days Offensive of the First World War. The action took place in and around the Belgian municipality of Honnelles, between 5 and 7 November 1918.

General Horne’s objective was to cross the French border into Belgium and forge a passage through the parallel rivers of the Grande Honnelle and Petite Honnelle, moving the battlefront towards the line between Mons on the left and Aulnois on the right.

== Background ==
In October 1918, the First and Third British Armies had broken through the Hindenburg Line, at the Second Battle of Cambrai. This collapse forced the German High Command to accept that the war had to be ended. Together with the failing German morale, this convinced many Allied commanders and political leaders that the war could be brought to an end in 1918; previously, all efforts had been concentrated on building up forces to mount a decisive attack in 1919.

In the aftermath of the Battle of Valenciennes on 1 November, the German Army was in retreat, to such an extent that Field Marshall Haig ordered a general advance, telling divisions to act vigorously on their own initiative so as to keep the Germans from establishing a firm line.

On 4 November the 3rd and 4th Canadian divisions arrived on both sides of the Valenciennes–Mons road; their front extended from Condé in the north to Marchipont in the south. The 56th (London) Infantry Division and 11th (Northern) Division were further south; their front extended from Rombies to Jenlain, with Third Army on the right.

== Battle ==
=== 5 November ===
Patrols from the 87th Battalion (Canadian Grenadier Guards), a unit of the 4th Canadian Division, crossed the Aunelle River, marking the liberation by the Canadians of the first part of occupied Belgium.

The 56th (London) Infantry Division attempted to take Honnelles. The 13th and 14th London Regiments failed to clear the area, however, the 1/5th London Regiment successfully secured Angreau in a tough battle along the Grande Honnelle.

To the south, the troops of the 11th (Northern) Division had crossed the Aunelle River at Sebourg the previous day. Four battalions advanced through Roisin: the 9th (Yorkshire Hussars) West Yorkshire Regiment, 6th Lincolnshire Regiment, 7th South Staffordshire Regiment and 9th Sherwood Foresters (Nottingham and Derbyshire Regiment). German artillery shelled the village, "despite the fact that the village was crowded with civilians".

Further south General Julian Byng's Third Army completely cleared the enemy from Forêt de Mormal.

The fighting was conducted in cold conditions and General Horne became concerned that muddy roads would prevent the advance. However, there was to be no let up and both XXII Corps and Canadian Corps were to continue the advance the following day, their objective being the railway line between Mons and Aulnois to the south.

=== 6 November ===
XXII Corps resumed their attack at 05:30, but immediately ran into strong German resistance. When the 11th (Northern) Infantry Division finally reached the left bank of the Grande Honnelle river they were unable to cross due to heavy enemy fire from the wooded slopes on the opposite bank, the Bois Caillouquibique d'Angre. When troops of the 56th (London) Infantry Division crossed the river to the east of Angreau they were immediately driven back to the left bank by a counterattack from Bois de Beaufort. Further north, men of the 56th Division crossed the Grande Honelle twice at Angre, reaching the high ground between Onnezies and Baisieux; again they were driven back by the enemy but managed to establish a bridgehead on the right bank of the river. During the night the 63rd (Royal Naval) Division came forward from a welcome rest at St. Pol, in relief of the 168th Brigade, 56th Division, west of Bois d'Audregnies. The 56th Division was then on a single brigade front, with the 11th Division on the right and the 63rd on the left.

To the north, the Canadian Corps had more success. The 4th Canadian Division advanced through more favourable terrain, allowing the deployment of artillery that helped in the capture of Quievrechain on the French side of the river. Pushing east, the Canadians crossed the border, forced a passage across the Grande Honelle between Angre and Quivrain, and went on to take part of the village of Baisieux, which lies on the sister river of La Petite Honnelle, about 1.5 miles north of Angre, where the 56th Division had made their bridgehead. Baisieux would be a strategic loss for the Germans, posing a threat to their line of retreat from the attack of XXII Corps in the south. This battle would be the last feat of arms of the 4th Canadian division in the war: during the night of 6–7 November the division was replaced by the 2nd Canadian Division.

Further north, beyond the Mons-Valenciennes railway line, the 3rd Canadian Division continued their advance between the River Escaut and the Mons-Conde canal, reaching the outskirts of the French village of Crespin. Floating footbridges were established on the Aunelle and Honnelle rivers.

Major Dudley Ward describes the action from the perspective of the 56th Division:

The German rearguards were only able, on especially favourable positions, to check the advance of a few divisions; on the whole the rearguards were being thrown back on the main retreating force. The roads were packed with enemy troops and transport, and the real modern cavalry, the low-flying aeroplanes, swooped down on them, with bomb and machine gun spreading panic and causing the utmost confusion.

During the night of 6–7 November the 63rd Division was put into line on the front of the 168th Brigade, and the 169th was relieved by the 167th Brigade. The 56th Division was then on a single brigade front, with the 11th Division on the right and the 63rd on the left.

At dawn on the 7th patrols found that the enemy was still in front of them, and at 9 a.m. the brigade attacked with the 8th Middlesex on the right and the 7th Middlesex on the left. They swept on through the northern part of the wood, and by 10.30 a.m. the 7th Middlesex entered the village of Onnezies. The Petite Honnelle River was crossed, and the village of Montignies taken in the afternoon. But after the Bavai-Hensies Road was crossed, opposition stiffened, and both artillery and machine-gun fire became severe. A line of outposts held the east of the road for the night.

=== 7 November ===
The 7th and 8th Middlesex Regiments advanced through Onnezies, crossing the Petite Honnelle into Montigny.

The 2nd Canadian Division liberated the rest of Baisieux and the village of Elouges. The 2nd and 3rd Canadian Division's released Quiévrain together and captured 500 prisoners. The 3rd Canadian Division continued its progression and liberated La Croix et Hensies, while just before midnight the 2nd Division took the villages of Bois-de-Boussu, Petit Hornu, Bois-de-Epinois and a portion of Bois-de-Leveque. In each village delivered, Canadian soldiers were warmly welcomed as liberators.

The troops then entered a densely populated area, where there were many mining villages. They found themselves facing the German army which was retreating while carrying out delaying actions. Meanwhile, rumours were already circulating that peace was imminent.

Major Dudley Ward continues his description:

Explosions and fires, which were continually observed at night behind the enemy lines, were more numerous on the night of 7th/8th, and when the advance was continued at 8 a.m., the two Middlesex battalions occupied the villages of Athis and Fayt-le-Franc with practically no opposition. By nightfall outposts were covering Petit Moranfayt, Trieu Jean Sart, Ferlibray, and Richon.

The road situation was worse than ever. Railhead was at Aubigny-au-Bac, and supply lorries were unable to proceed any farther than the Honnelle River owing to the destruction of the bridges. Rain fell all the time, and cross-country tracts were impassable. All traffic was thrown on the main roads, which, to the west of the river, were now in such a state that all supplies were late. Arrangements were made for aeroplanes to drop food to the advance troops, but fortunately this was found unnecessary.

The enemy was now in full retreat on the whole of the British front. To the south the Guards Division entered Maubeuge, and to the north the Canadians were approaching Mons. The 56th Division marched forward through the villages of Coron, Rieu-de-Bury, Quevy-le-Grand, and Quevy-le-Petit, and by the evening were on the line of the Mons-Maubeuge road behind a line of outposts held by the 1st London Regt.

== Analysis ==
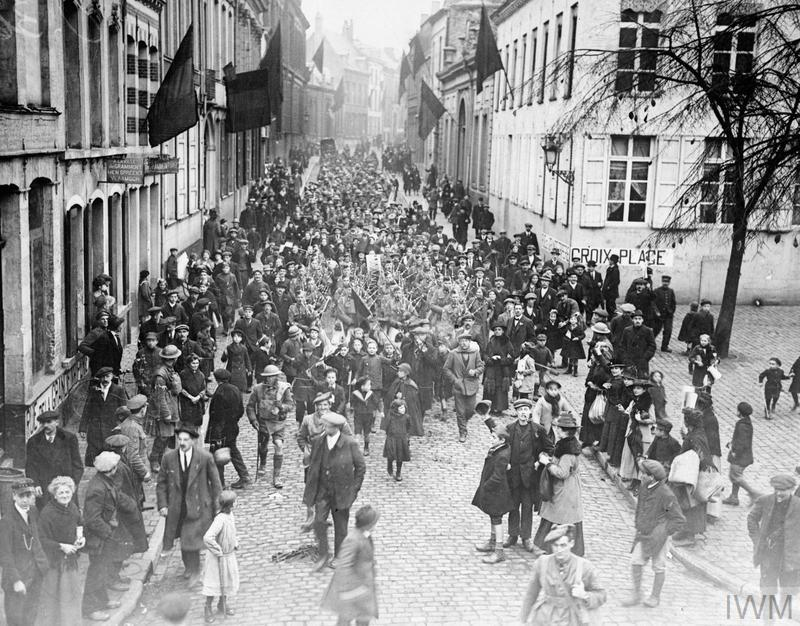
Canadian troops marching through the streets of Mons on the morning of 11 November 1918.

Although the main attack on the 6th had not been a total success for the allied forces, General Horne's First Army had established bridgeheads across the Grande Honnelle and threatened the retreat of the German army via Baisieux. As day became night, the evening patrols soon discovered that the enemy had indeed begun a retreat, meeting little opposition along the length of the First Army's front. During the night, the 56th Division crossed the Grande Honnelle, occupying the high ground northeast of Angre - unlike the actions during the previous day when they were twice forced to retreat from the same region, this advance went unopposed, setting the tone for the next few days.

The advance was now continuous and almost unopposed by enemy infantry; however, isolated machine-gun detachments and sporadic artillery fire continued to cause casualties as what had been a battle became a pursuit. As Horne had predicted, the progress of the advance was mainly governed by the state of the roads, and the ability to get rations to the forward troops. The Canadian troops reached Mons late on the night of 10 November and on the morning of 11 November, having fought seven major battles, Horne's First Army entered Mons, where the first battle of the war had taken place in 1914.

== Order of Battle ==
The order of battle for this phase of the final advance included units of General Horne's First Army and General Byng's Third Army.

Order of Battle for the Passage of the Grande Honnelle
Army	Corps	Division
First Army (Horne)	XXII Corps (Godley)	11th (Northern) Division
First Army (Horne)	XXII Corps (Godley)	56th (1st London) Division
First Army (Horne)	XXII Corps (Godley)	63rd (Royal Naval) Division
First Army (Horne)	Canadian Corps (Currie)	2nd Canadian Division
First Army (Horne)	Canadian Corps (Currie)	4th Canadian Division
Third Army (Byng)	XVII Corps (Fergusson)	19th (Western) Division
Third Army (Byng)	XVII Corps (Fergusson)	24th Division

== Sources ==
- Nicholson, G. W. L. (1962). Official History of the Canadian Army in the First World War 1914-1919 (PDF). Ottawa: Minister of National Defence.
- Farr, Don (2007). Silent General: Horne of the First Army. Solihull: Helion & Company Limited. ISBN 9781874622994.
- Douglas, Jerrold (1923). The Royal Naval Division. London: Hutchinson.
- Ward, C. H. Dudley (1921). The 56th Division (1st London Territorial Division). London: John Murray.
- Rawson, Andrew (2018). British Expeditionary Force - The Final Advance: September to November 1918. Pen & Sword Military. ISBN 9781526723475.
- Beckett, Ian (2017). The British Army and the First World War. Cambridge University Press. doi:10.1017/9780511794377.011. ISBN 9781107005778.
- Tucker, Spencer C. (2014). World War I: The Definitive Encyclopedia and Document Collection [5 volumes]. ABC-CLIO. ISBN 978-1851099658.
