= Athis =

Athis may refer to:

- Athis, Honnelles, a village in the Honnelles municipality, Belgium
- Athis, Marne, a commune in the Marne département, France
- Athis-Mons, a commune in the Essonne département, near Paris, France
- Gué d'Athis, a fort near Fleury-sur-Orne
- Athis (mythology), a character in Greek and Roman mythology
- Athis (moth), a genus of moths
