= List of protected heritage sites in Quévy =

This table shows an overview of the protected heritage sites in the Walloon town Quévy. This list is part of Belgium's national heritage.

Object	Year/architect	Town/section	Address	Coordinates	Number^{?}	Image
Church of Saint-Gery, in Blaregnies ^{(nl)} ^{(fr)}		Quévy		50.356674°N 3.898098°E	53084-CLT-0004-01 Info	Kerk Saint-Géry, te Blaregnies
Church of Saint-Martin in Bougnies ^{(nl)} ^{(fr)}		Quévy		50.387269°N 3.941215°E	53084-CLT-0005-01 Info	Kerk Saint-Martin te Bougnies
St. Martin's Church in Givry ^{(nl)} ^{(fr)}		Quévy		50.379875°N 4.029486°E	53084-CLT-0008-01 Info	Kerk Saint-Martin te Givry
The facades and roofs of the farm in Quévy on the rue Malplaquet n ° 20 ^{(nl)} ^{(fr)}		Quévy		50.339023°N 3.901091°E	53084-CLT-0010-01 Info	
The barn in Havay located at the corner of rue de l'Abreuvoir No. 2 and rue de Villers ^{(nl)} ^{(fr)}		Quévy		50.362378°N 3.986248°E	53084-CLT-0011-01 Info	
The barn in Havay next to the barn located at the corner of rue de l'Abreuvoir No. 2 and de la rue de Villers ^{(nl)} ^{(fr)}		Quévy		50.362608°N 3.985828°E	53084-CLT-0012-01 Info	

== See also ==
- List of protected heritage sites in Hainaut (province)
- Quévy
