= Théodore Bernier =

- Born: 27 June 1843; Angre, Hainaut, Belgium
- Died: 6 June 1893 (aged 49); Angre, Hainaut Belgium
- Education: autodidact
- Children: Charles Théodore Bernier
- Writing career
- Language: French
- Period: 19th century
- Genre: non-fiction
- Subjects: history, archaeology, inscriptions, genealogy
- Notable work: Dictionnaire historique, archéologique, biographique et bibliographique du Hainaut (1879)
- Literary movement: antiquarian

Théodore Antoine Bernier (1843–1893) was a Belgian archaeologist, historian, and genealogist.

== Life ==
Bernier was born in Angre, Hainaut Province, on 27 June 1843, to a farming family. After primary education he became a jobbing painter and then found work in a bookshop in Mons. An autodidact, he read about palaeography, history, archaeology, genealogy and numismatics. A prolific writer, he also worked with Leopold Devillers, head of the provincial archive in Mons, to record and preserve old documents, inscriptions, parish registers, local and family archives, oral memories, and other material.

Bernier established a public library in Angre, as well as a museum in which he displayed finds from his own archaeological excavations. In 1883 he discovered the "Caillou-qui-Bique" cave in the Bois d'Angre. He died at Angre on 6 June 1893, aged 49.

== Publications ==
- Histoire des seigneuries de Quiévrain, Baisieux, Angreau et Marchipont (Mons, Alfred Thiemann, 1865)
- Recherches historiques sur le village d'Angre (Angre and Mons, 1875)
- Le pèlerinage de saint Druon à Sébourg (Mons, Dequesne-Masquillier, 1876)
- Dictionnaire historique, archéologique, biographique et bibliographique du Hainaut (Mons, Hector Manceaux, 1879; second edition 1891)
- Histoire de la ville de Beaumont (Angre and Mons, 1880)
