= Montignies =

Montignies may refer to

- Montignies-sur-Sambre, a section of the Belgian town of Charleroi within the Walloon region in the Province of Hainaut, along the river Sambre
- Montignies-sur-Roc, a village in the municipality Honnelles, in the Belgian province of Hainaut. The village is located near the French border, along the river la Petite Honnelle.
