= Charles Théodore Bernier =

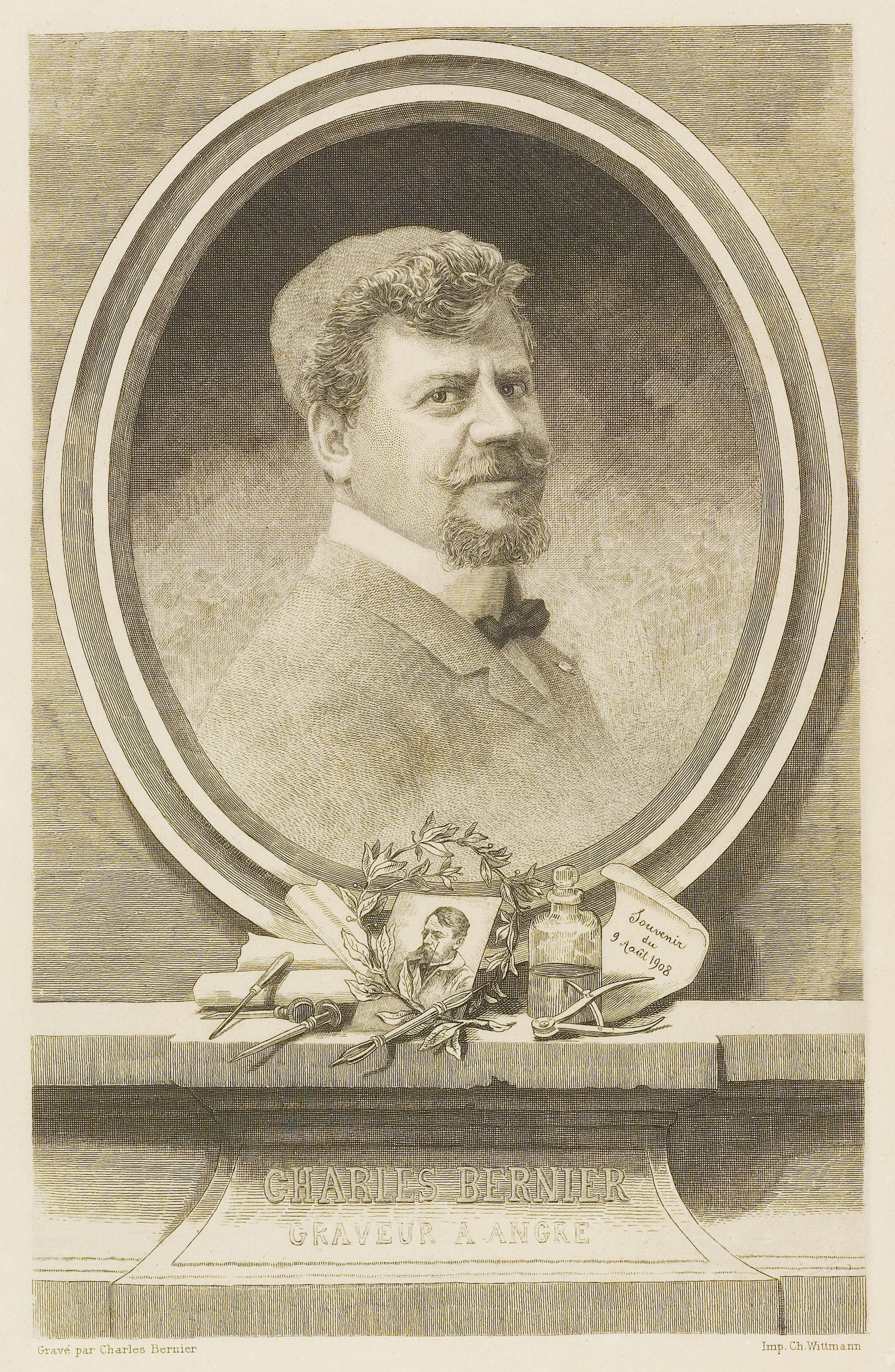
- Charles Bernier
- Born: 1 June 1871; Angre, Hainaut, Belgium
- Died: 9 July 1950 (aged 79); Angre, Hainaut, Belgium
- Education: Athénée royal de Mons; Académie des Beaux-Arts de Mons
- Spouse: Euphrasie Goret
- Parents: Théodore Bernier (father); Stéphanie Baudour (mother)

Charles Théodore Bernier (1871–1950) was a Belgian engraver and etcher who sometimes worked under the pseudonym Charles Dubailly. Initially known for engraved reproductions of Old Masters, he later gained recognition as a portraitist.

== Life ==
Charles Bernier was born in Angre on 1 June 1871, the son of Théodore Bernier and Stéphanie Baudour. He attended the Athénée royal de Mons and the Académie des Beaux-Arts de Mons, where he studied under Antoine Bourlard and Auguste Danse. He was awarded the Prix de Rome in 1891, and in 1892 received a grant for further study in Paris, where he was mentored by Léon Bonnat. He returned home early due to his father's death in June 1893. Remaining in Angre, he worked as a painter and engraver and promoted the local drama society. In 1896 he married Euphrasie Goret.

In the spring of 1899, Émile Verhaeren arrived in Angre with a number of sightseers to visit the local archaeological museum established by Bernier's father. Verhaeren and Bernier became firm friends, and would walk in the Bois d'Angre together, to the cave "Caillou-qui-Bique" cave that Bernier's father had discovered in 1883.

In 1903 Bernier was commissioned to engrave a portrait of Pope Pius X. He exhibited at the Louisiana Purchase Exposition in St. Louis (1904), the Exposition internationale de Liège (1905), and the Grand Palais in Paris (1906). In 1907 the French government awarded him the title of Officier de l'Instruction Publique.

In 1922 he was appointed a schools inspector for art education, serving in the position until 1932. On 7 August 1949, a bronze statue of Bernier by the French sculptor Elie Raset was unveiled in Angre. It was replaced with a replica in 2008 after the original was stolen. He died in Angre on 9 July 1950.
