= List of protected heritage sites in Honnelles =

This table shows an overview of the protected heritage sites in the Walloon town Honnelles. This list is part of Belgium's national heritage.

Object	Year/architect	Town/section	Address	Coordinates	Number^{?}	Image
Valley of the Honnelle and "Caillou qui bique" ^{(nl)} ^{(fr)}		Honnelles		50.360283°N 3.693516°E	53083-CLT-0001-01 Info	Vallei van de Honnelle en de "Caillou qui bique"
Castle farm dovecote ^{(nl)} ^{(fr)}		Honnelles	rue Grande, n°18	50.364314°N 3.717096°E	53083-CLT-0002-01 Info	
St. Martin's Church ^{(nl)} ^{(fr)}		Honnelles		50.368020°N 3.695109°E	53083-CLT-0003-01 Info	Kerk Saint-Martin
Castle of Roisin: old buildings known as "les elles tour" (facades and roofs) ^{(nl)} ^{(fr)}		Honnelles		50.331353°N 3.698101°E	53083-CLT-0004-01 Info	Kasteel van Roisin: oude bijgebouwen geheten "les tourelles" (gevels en daken)

== See also ==
- List of protected heritage sites in Hainaut (province)
- Honnelles
