= Angreau =

- Village
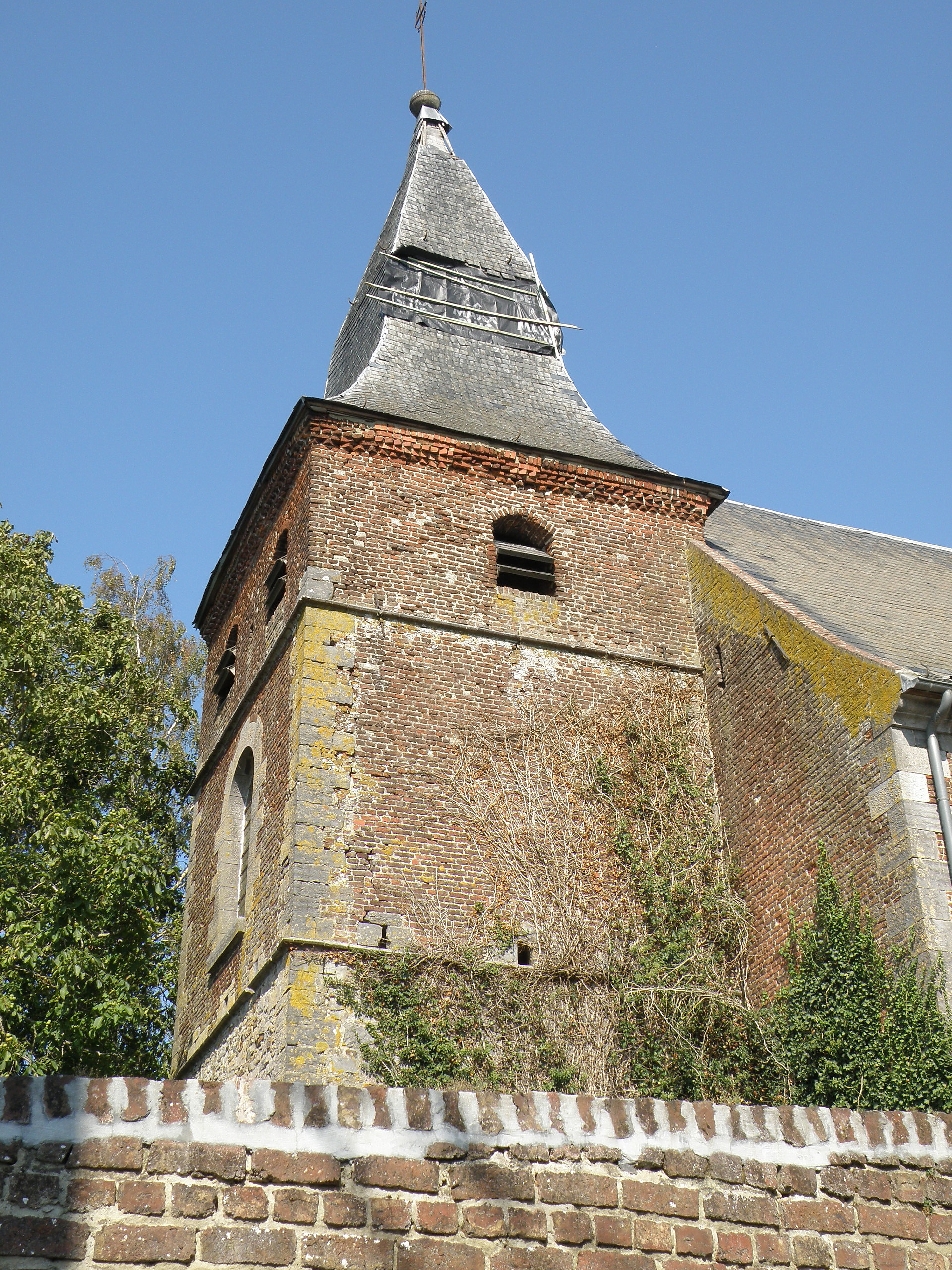
- Saint Amand's church

- Location of Angreau in Honnelles

- Location in Belgium
- Coordinates: 50°21′05″N 3°41′27″E
- Country: Belgium
- Region: Wallonia
- Province: Hainaut
- Municipality: Honnelles
- Postal code: 7387
- Area code: 065

Angreau (French pronunciation: [ɑ̃ɡʁo]; Walloon: Angrea) is a village of Wallonia and district of the municipality of Honnelles, located in the province of Hainaut, Belgium.

== History ==
The earliest mention of this locality is Angrellum (Latin: little Angre). In the first Middle Ages, Angreau was part of the stronghold of Angre, of which it was probably an outbuilding with a fortified tower. Angreau has been a commune since the year 1250.

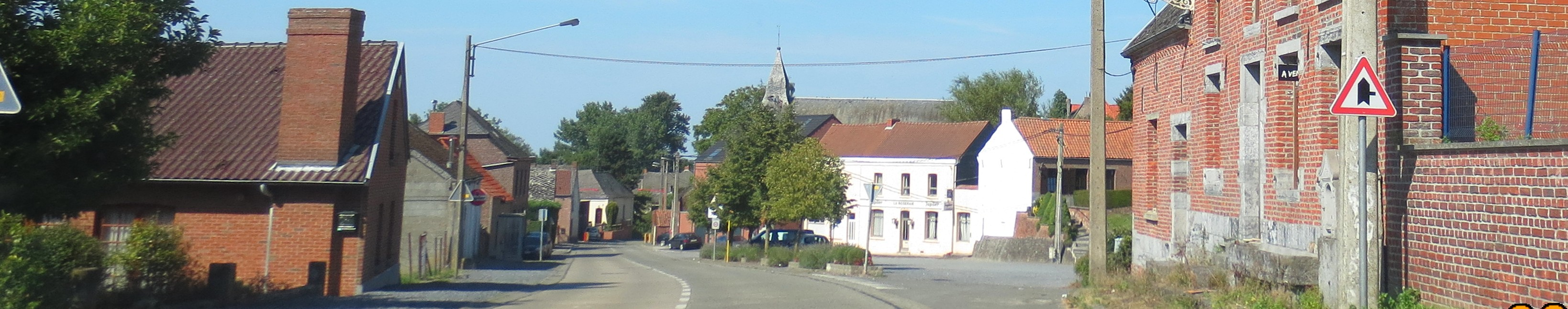
View of the village.
