= Givry, Quévy =

Coordinates: 50.37952°N 4.03589°E

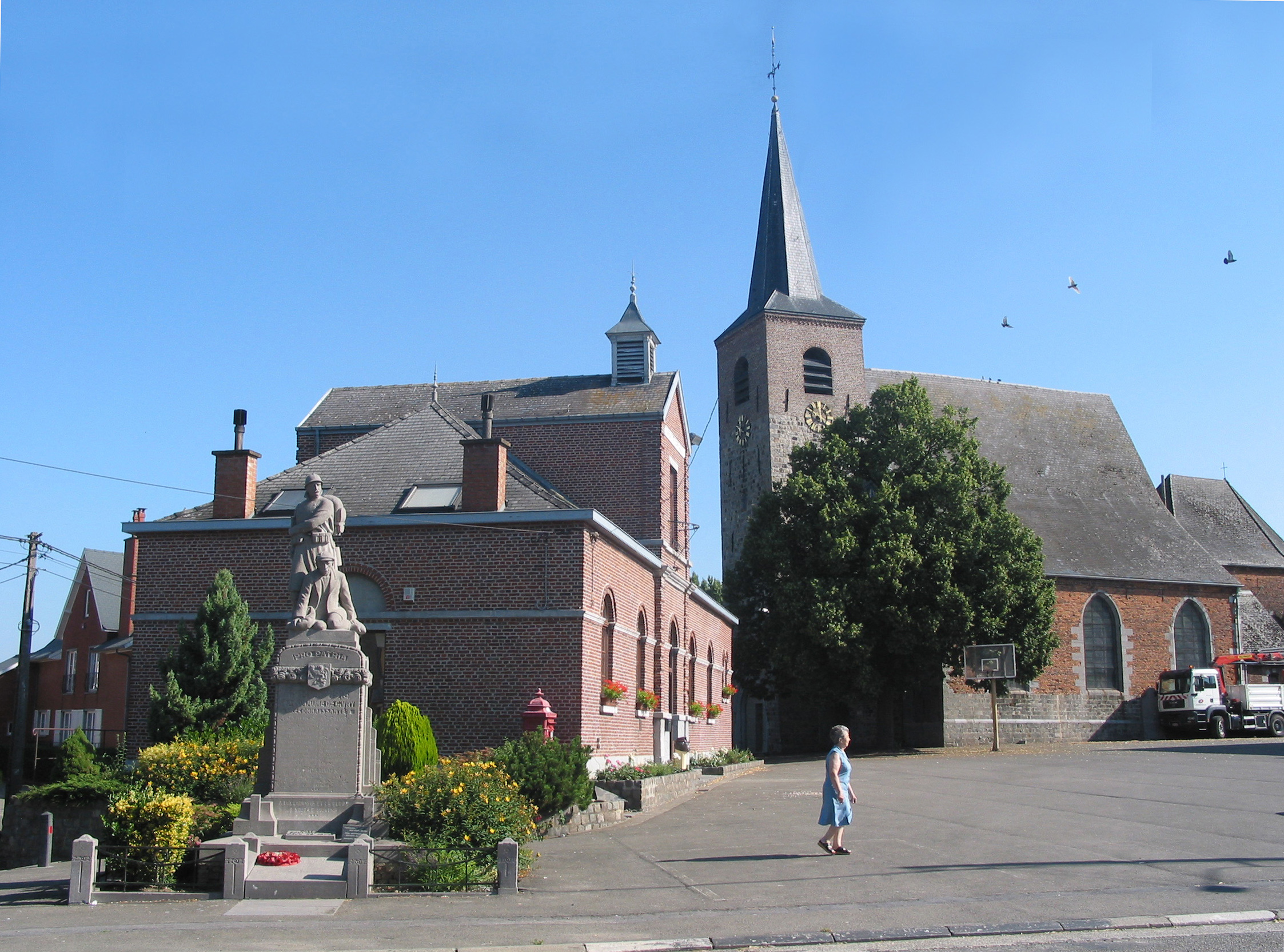
The Town Hall and St. Martin's church (13th, 16th and 18th centuries)

Givry (French pronunciation: [ʒivʁi]; Walloon: Djivri) is a village of Wallonia and a district of the municipality of Quévy, located in the province of Hainaut, Belgium.

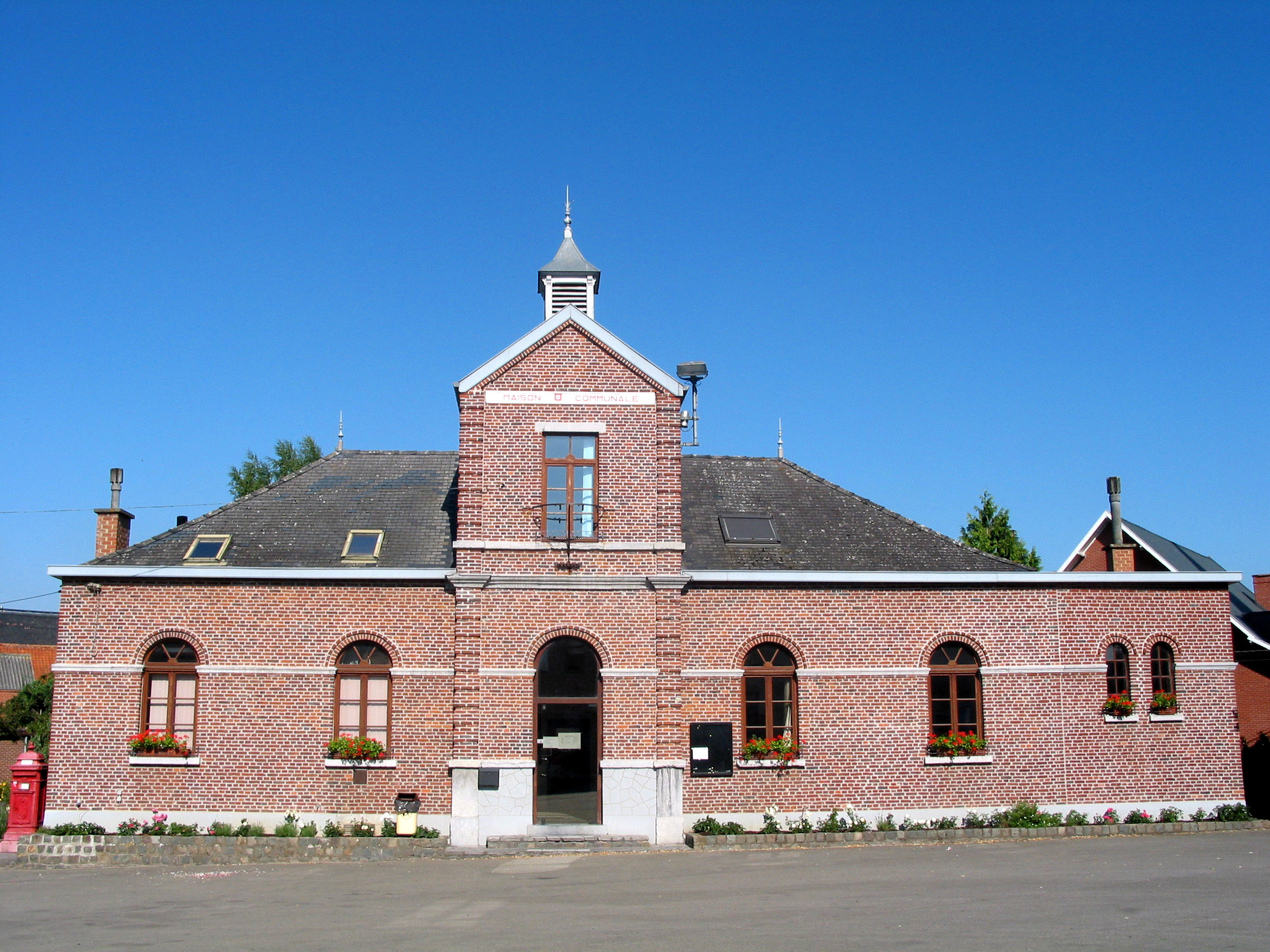
The Town Hall

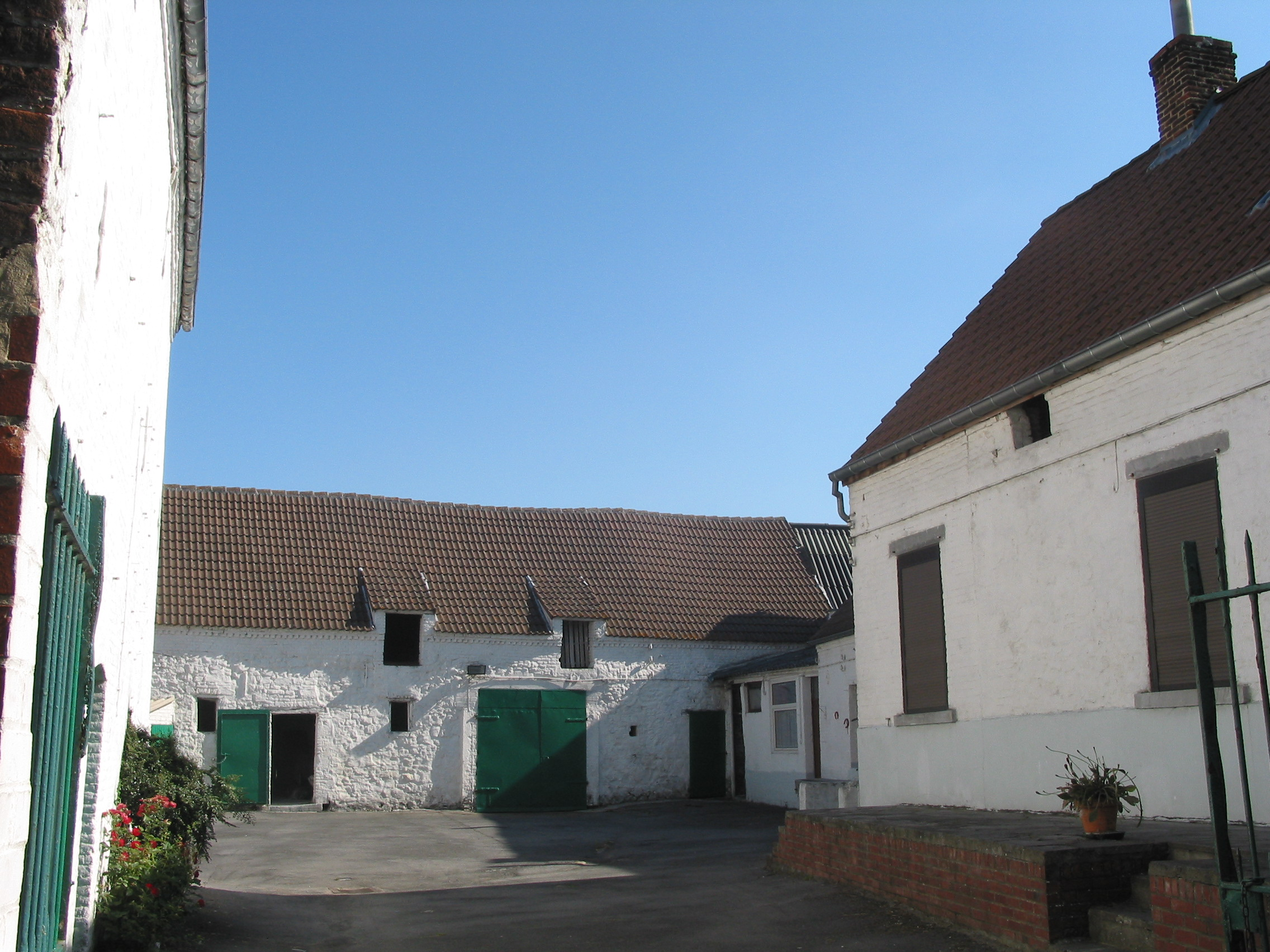
An old farm with a square courtyard in Givry
