= Léo Collard =

Belgian politician (1902–1981)

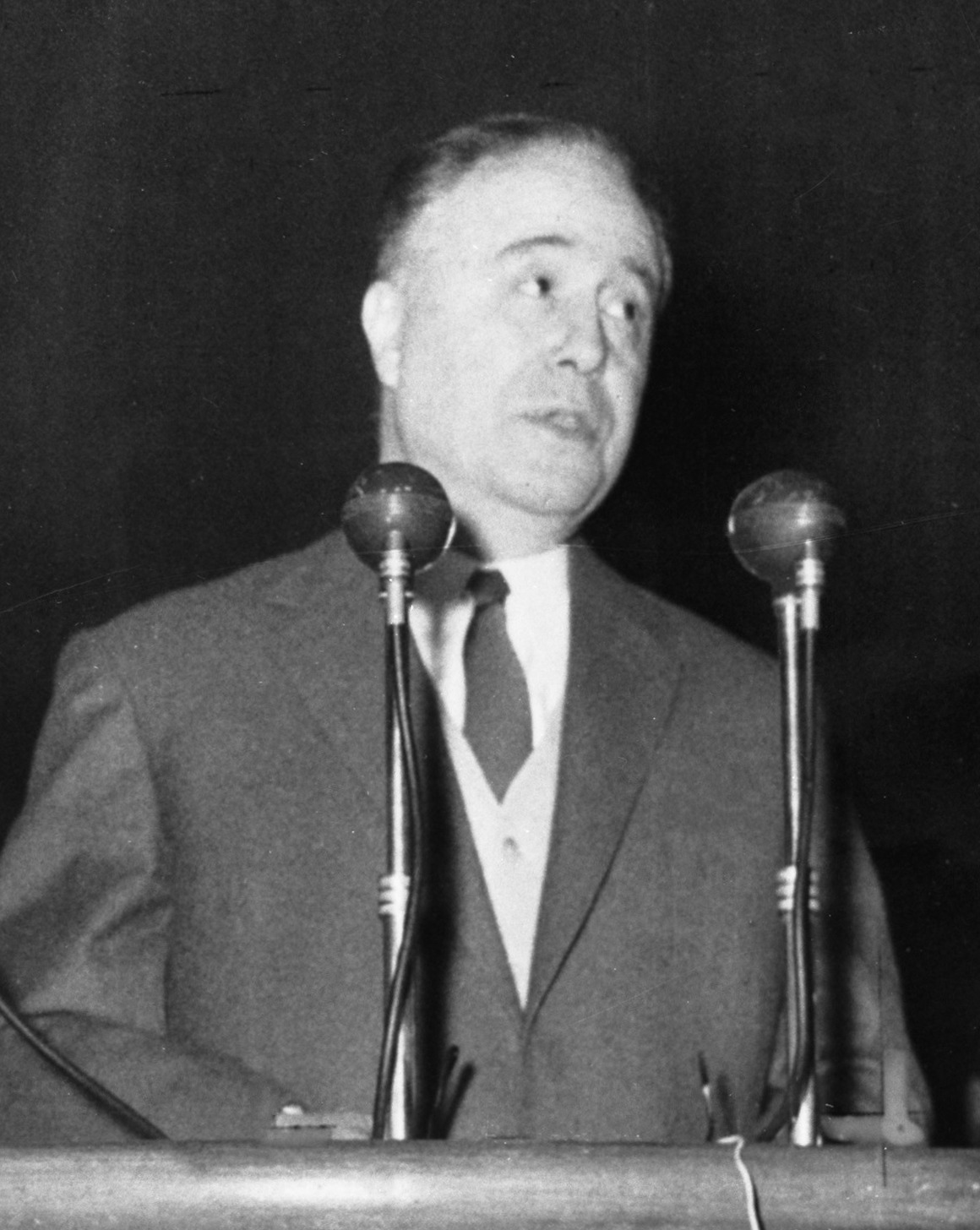
- Collard in 1968
- Born: 11 July 1902; Aulnois, Belgium
- Died: 27 January 1981 (aged 78); Mons, Belgium
- Occupation: politician
- Known for: Mayor of Mons

Léo Collard (11 July 1902 – 27 January 1981) was a Belgian politician in the Belgian Socialist Party (PSB–BSP) who served as minister of public education (1946 and 1954–1958) and Mayor of Mons (1953–1974).

In 1955, Collard tried to defund non-state schools and reverse an increase in teachers' pay brought in by the previous Christian Social Party government, while massively expanding state-owned schools. This led to the most violent phase of political conflict over educational funding in post-war Belgium, known as the Second School War, in which the Christian Social Party and the Catholic Church pressed for parity between free and state-run education. Collard also introduced a requirement that all teachers be officially certified, making many priests and members of religious orders already working as teachers ineligible for the positions they held.

In 1963 Leo Collard was appointed Minister of State.
