= Erquennes =

- Village
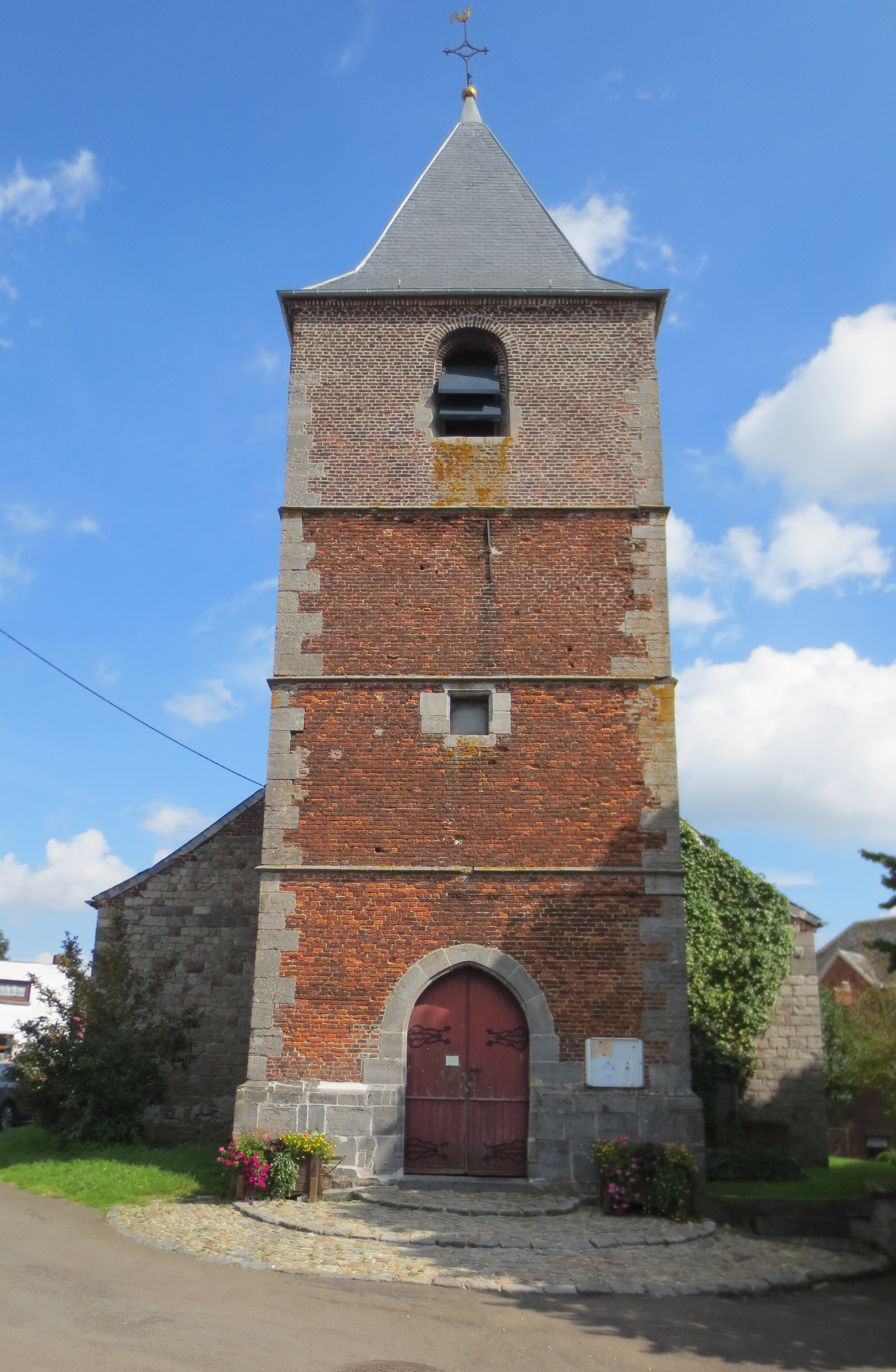
- Erquennes Church

- Location of Erquennes in Honnelles

- Location in Belgium
- Coordinates: 50°21′32″N 3°47′36″E
- Country: Belgium
- Region: Wallonia
- Province: Hainaut
- Municipality: Honnelles
- Postal code: 7387
- Area code: 065

Erquennes (French pronunciation: [ɛʁkɛn]; Walloon: Erkene) is a village of Wallonia and district of the municipality of Honnelles, located in the province of Hainaut, Belgium.
