= Brasserie des Rocs =

Belgian brewery

Coordinates: 51.0009°N 3.8052°E

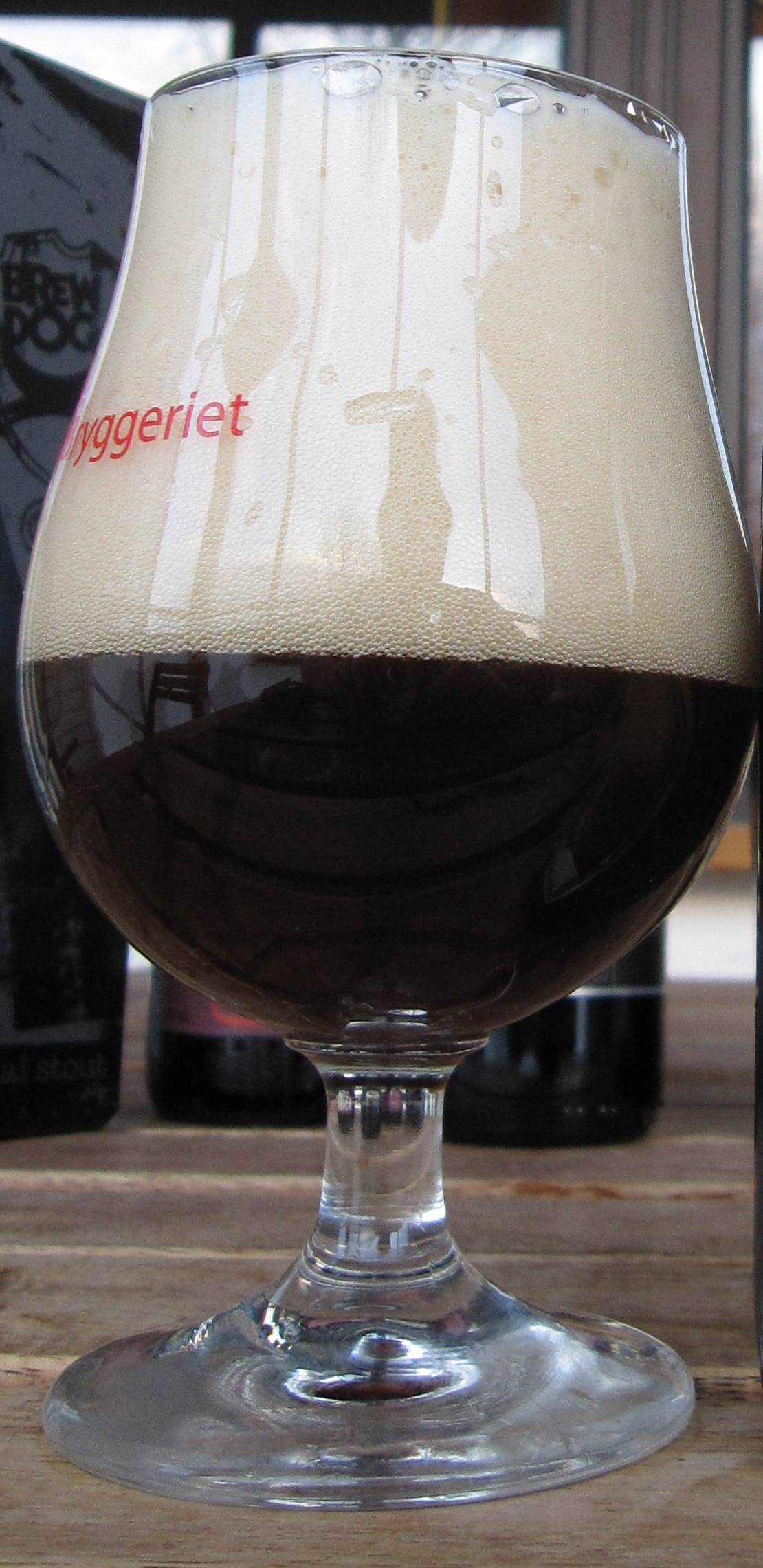
Brune from the Brasserie de l'Abbaye des Rocs

The Brasserie des Rocs (formerly known as Brasserie de l'Abbaye des Rocs) is a brewery in Montignies-sur-Roc, Belgium. Founded in 1979, the company brews ales in the traditional Belgian style. Their Triple Imperiale, a tripel without added sugars, was the Chicago Tribune's "Beer of the Month" in 2007. Their Blonde, a blonde ale, got first place in a test of 23 Belgian ales in The New York Times.

Their beers are exported to various countries, including Japan and the United States.

== List of ales produced ==
- Grand Cru, 9.5% (brown ale)
- Ambree, 9% (amber ale)
- Blanche double 6% (wheat ale)
- Blonde, 7.5% (blonde ale)
- Triple Imperiale, 10% (tripel)
- Brune, 9% (brown ale)
