= Autreppe =

- Village
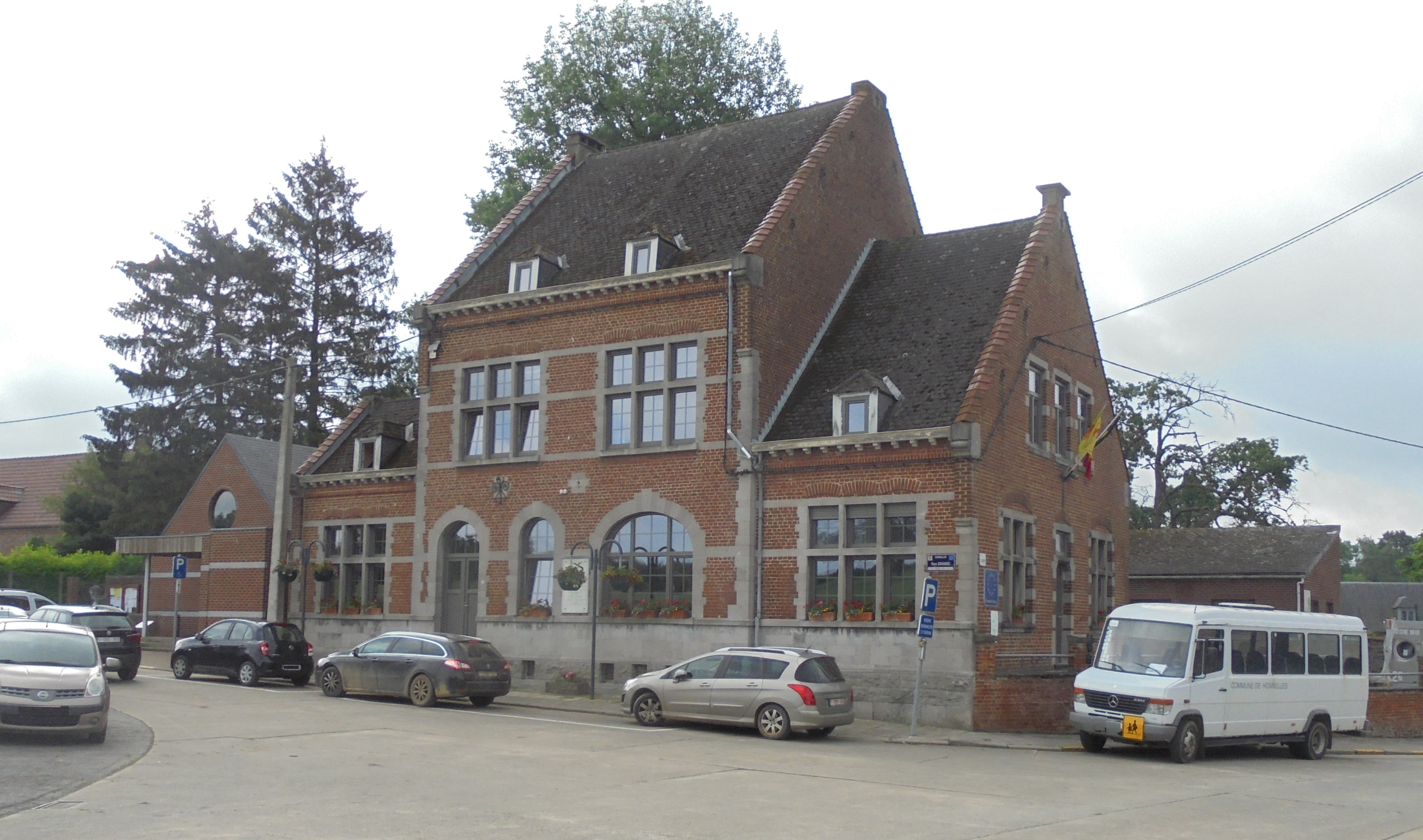
- Former town hall

- Location of Autreppe in Honnelles

- Location in Belgium
- Coordinates: 50°20′47″N 3°43′54″E
- Country: Belgium
- Region: Wallonia
- Province: Hainaut
- Municipality: Honnelles
- Postal code: 7387
- Area code: 065

Autreppe (French pronunciation: [otʁɛp]; Walloon: Otrepe) is a village of Wallonia and district of the municipality of Honnelles, located in the province of Hainaut, Belgium. A frontier village of the Haut-Pays (highlands), it is crossed by the Hogneau, a stream coming from France and which has the name of Grande Honnelle there, a name it keeps throughout its journey in Belgium.
