= Roisin (Honnelles) =

- Village
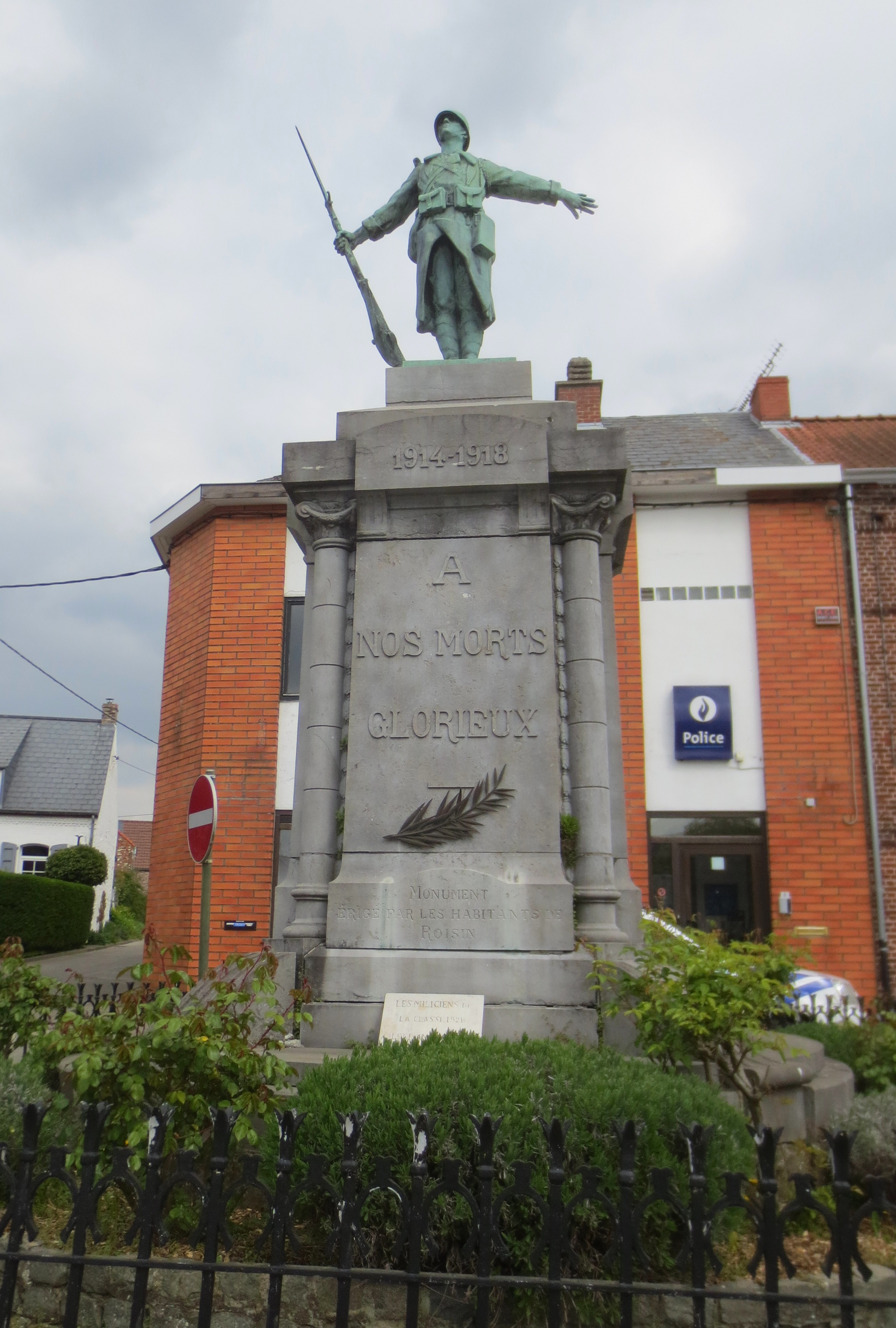
- War Memorial

- Location of Roisin in Honnelles

- Location in Belgium
- Coordinates: 50°19′59″N 3°41′38″E
- Country: Belgium
- Region: Wallonia
- Province: Hainaut
- Municipality: Honnelles
- Postal code: 7387
- Area code: 065

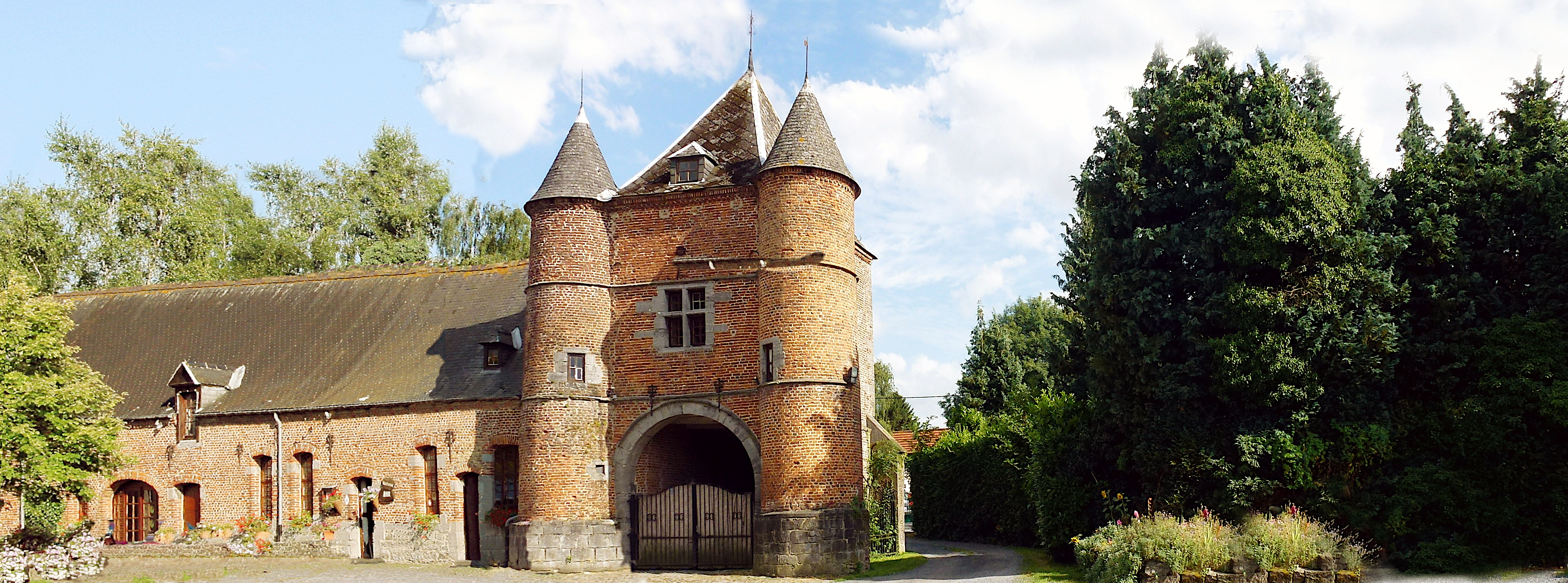
Panoramic photograph of Baudry's castel

Roisin (French pronunciation: [ʁwazɛ̃]; Walloon: Rwazin) is a village of Wallonia and district of the municipality of Honnelles, located in the province of Hainaut, Belgium.
