= Aulnois, Belgium =

Aulnois Ônwa (Walloon)
- Village
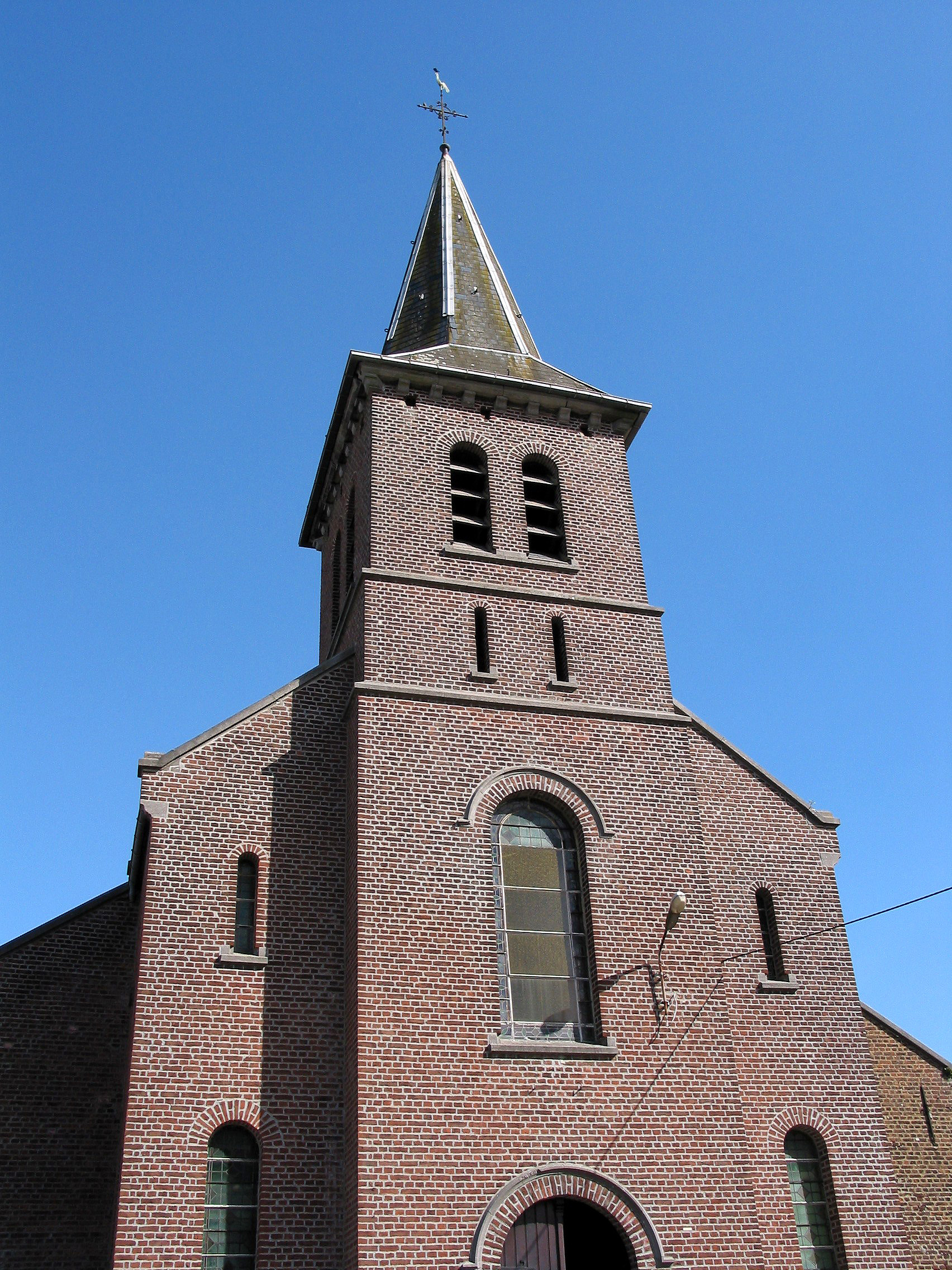
- L'église Saint-Brice

- Coat of arms

- Location within Belgium
- Coordinates: 50°21′N 03°56′E
- Country: Belgium
- Region: Wallonia
- Province: Hainaut
- Municipality: Quévy

Aulnois (French pronunciation: [onwa]; Walloon: Ônwa) is a village of Wallonia and a district of the municipality of Quévy, located in the province of Hainaut, Belgium.

Aulnois was an independent municipality until the municipal reorganisation of 1977. The village is on the border with France and on a 96 km long railway line, with a railway station that used to serve as a border station.

== History ==
The village is intersected by the Chaussée Brunehaut, an important roadway between Cologne and Bavay that dates back to Roman times. Coins from the Roman and Franconian times were found around Aulnois.

== Born in Aulnois ==
- Leo Collard, politician
