= Quévy =

Municipality in Hainaut Province, Wallonia, Belgium

Quévy Kévi (Picard)
- Municipality
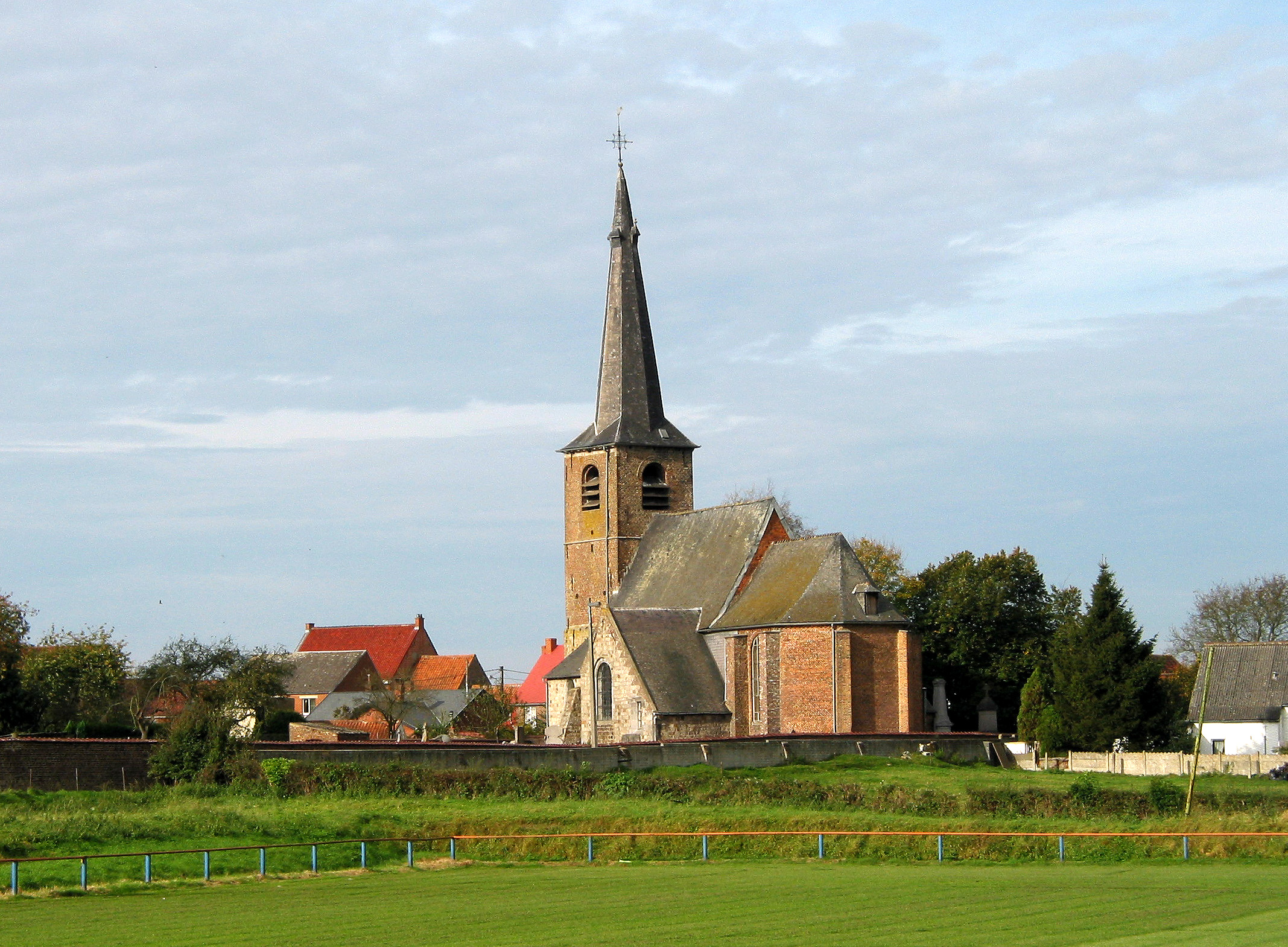

- Flag Coat of arms

- Location of Quévy in Hainaut
- Interactive map of Quévy
- Location in Belgium
- Coordinates: 50°21′N 03°56′E
- Country: Belgium
- Community: French Community
- Region: Wallonia
- Province: Hainaut
- Arrondissement: Mons

Government
  - Mayor: Florence Lecompte (PS)
  - Governing party: PS - MR+

Area
  - Total: 65.38 km^{2} (25.24 sq mi)

Population (2018-01-01)
  - Total: 8,105
  - Density: 124.0/km^{2} (321.1/sq mi)
- Postal codes: 7040, 7041
- NIS code: 53084
- Area codes: 065
- Website: www.quevy.be

Quévy (French pronunciation: [kevi]; Picard: Kévi) is a municipality of Wallonia located in the province of Hainaut, Belgium.

On 1 January 2006, Quévy had a total population of 7,734. The total area is 65.16 km^{2} which gives a population density of 119 inhabitants per km^{2}.

The municipality consists of the following districts: Asquillies, Aulnois, Blaregnies, Bougnies, Genly, Givry, Gœgnies-Chaussée, Havay, Quévy-le-Grand, and Quévy-le-Petit.

It is on the former main rail route between Brussels and Paris, and it was the virtual tariff border between the French SNCF and Belgian Railways SNCB.
