= Onnezies =

- Village
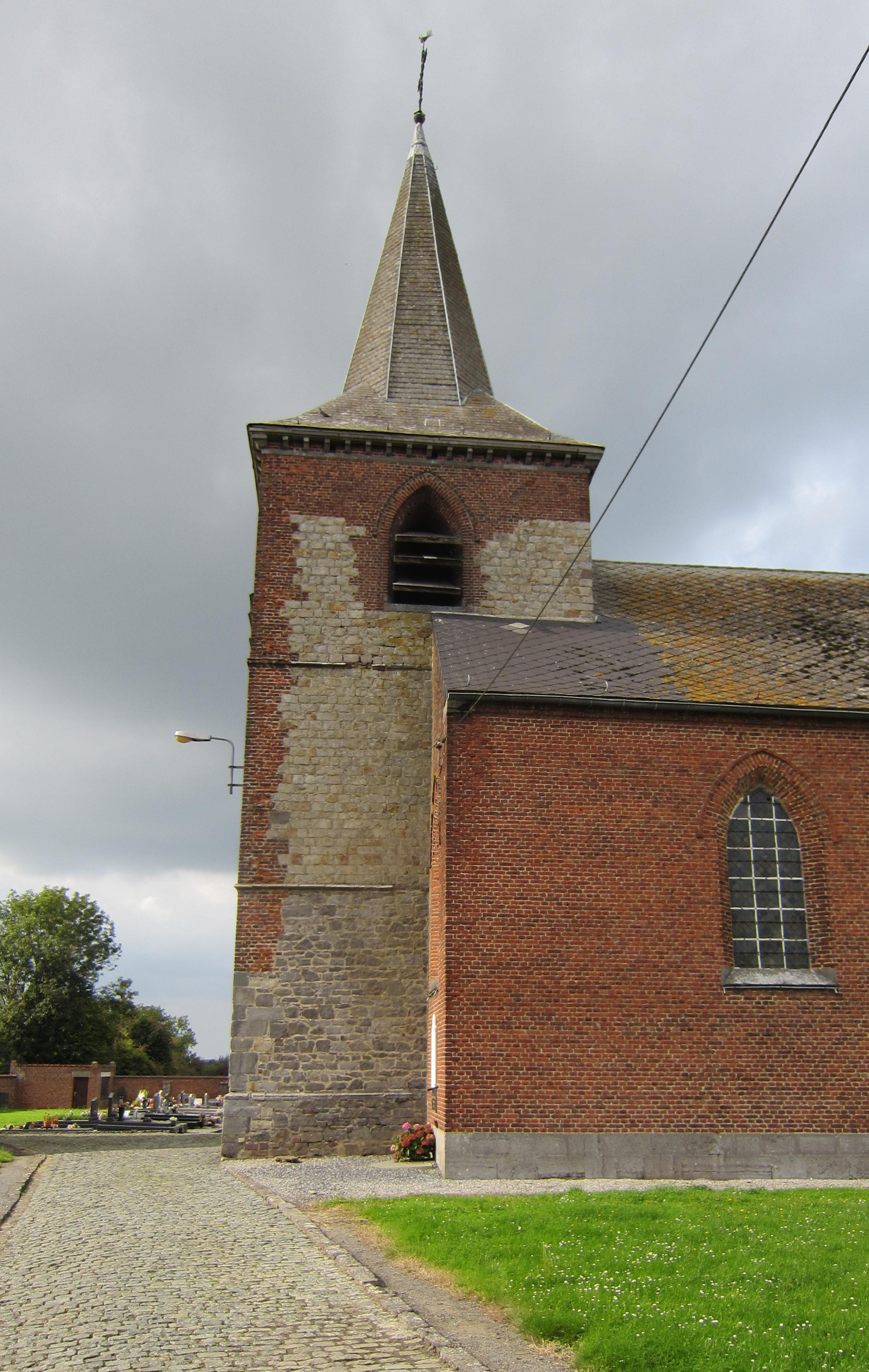
- Saint Peter's church

- Location of Onnezies in Honnelles

- Location in Belgium
- Coordinates: 50°21′49″N 3°42′59″E
- Country: Belgium
- Region: Wallonia
- Province: Hainaut
- Municipality: Honnelles
- Postal code: 7387
- Area code: 065

Onnezies (French pronunciation: [ɔnzi]; Walloon: Onziye) is a village of Wallonia and district of the municipality of Honnelles, located in the province of Hainaut, Belgium.
