= Marchipont =

- Section
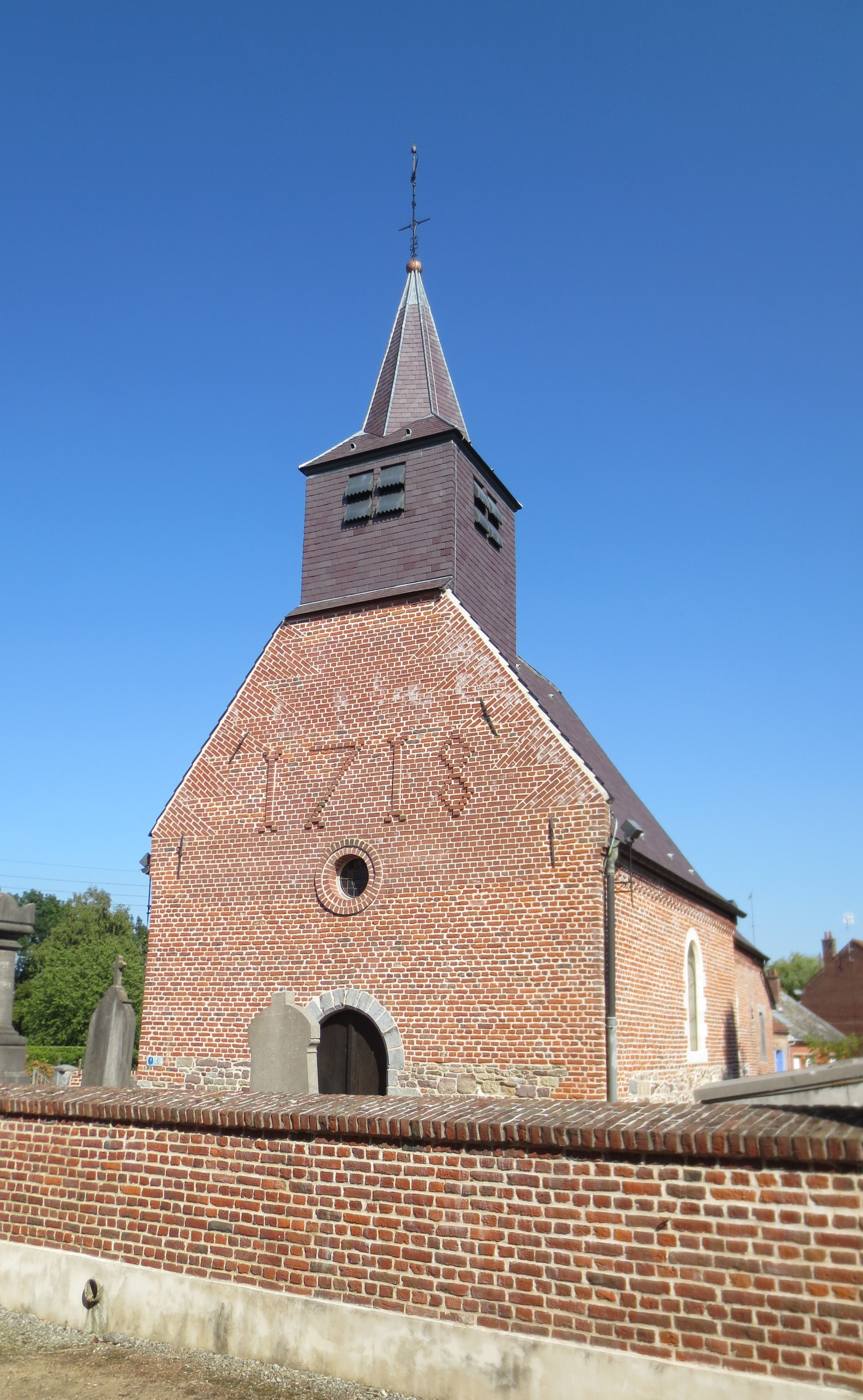

- Location within Belgium
- Coordinates: 50°22′41″N 03°40′2″E
- Country: Belgium
- Region: Wallonia
- Province: Hainaut
- Municipality: Honnelles

Marchipont (Walloon: Mårtchipont) is a village of Wallonia and district of the municipality of Honnelles, located in the province of Hainaut, Belgium.

== History ==
The existence of this borough is attested, in various forms, in very old documents (11th century), demonstrating that smallness and longevity can go hand in hand.

A lost land, between Angre and Quiévrain, suspended between France and Belgium, forgotten in the extreme northwest of Les Honnelles, Marchipont was even, from its origins, the ideal hideout for smugglers. the Honnelles region has a common border with France, several tens of kilometers long, and this border has until recently, been the battleground of customs officials and fraudsters.
