= Fayt-le-Franc =

- Village
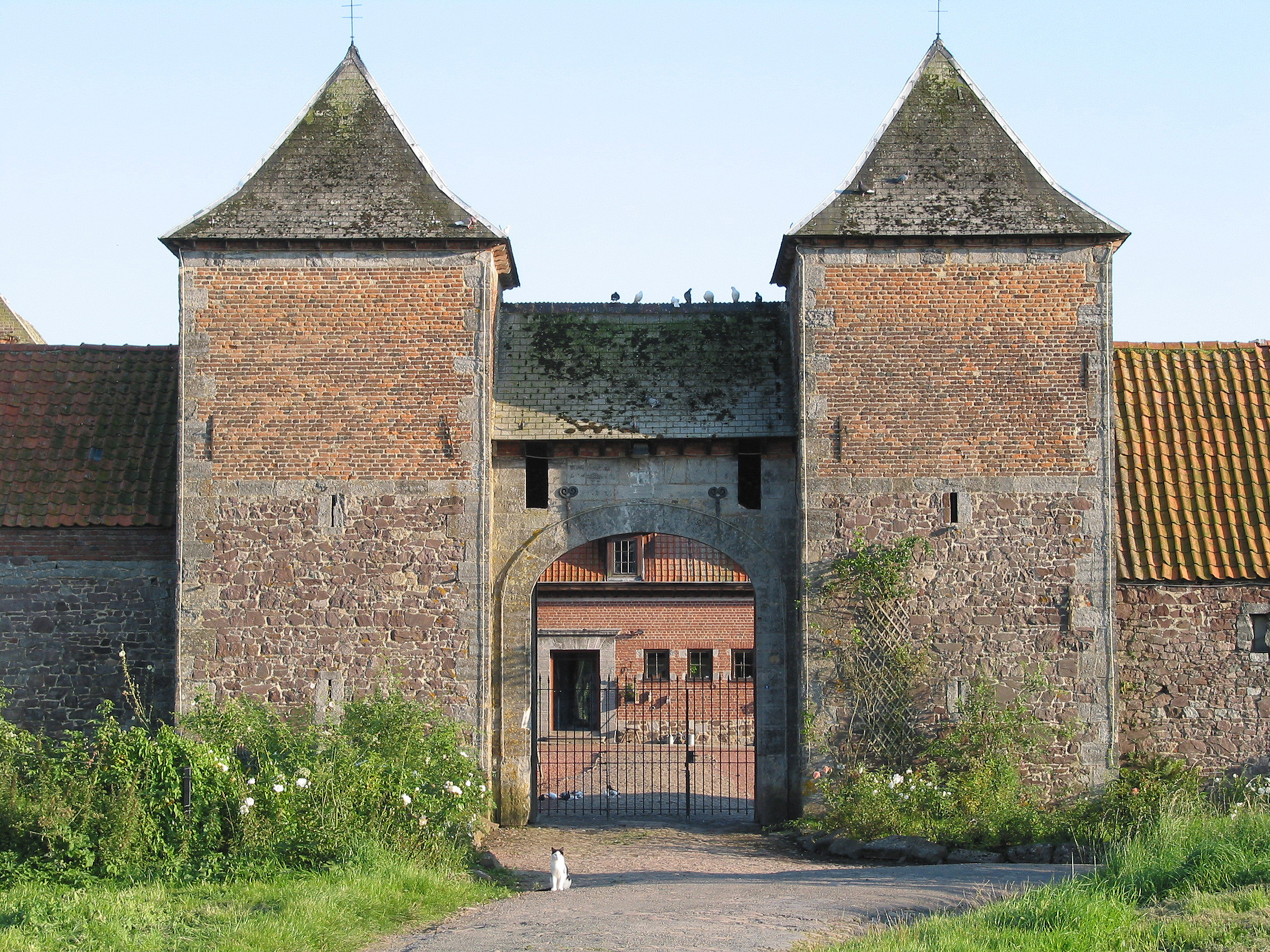
- Rampemont castle-farm, Fayt-le-Franc

- Location of Fayt-le-Franc in Honnelles

- Location in Belgium
- Coordinates: 50°21′24″N 3°46′21″E
- Country: Belgium
- Region: Wallonia
- Province: Hainaut
- Municipality: Honnelles
- Postal code: 7387
- Area code: 065

Fayt-le-Franc (Walloon: Fayi-l'-Franc) is a village of Wallonia and district of the municipality of Honnelles, located in the province of Hainaut, Belgium.

== Gallery ==
Images of Fayt-le-Franc
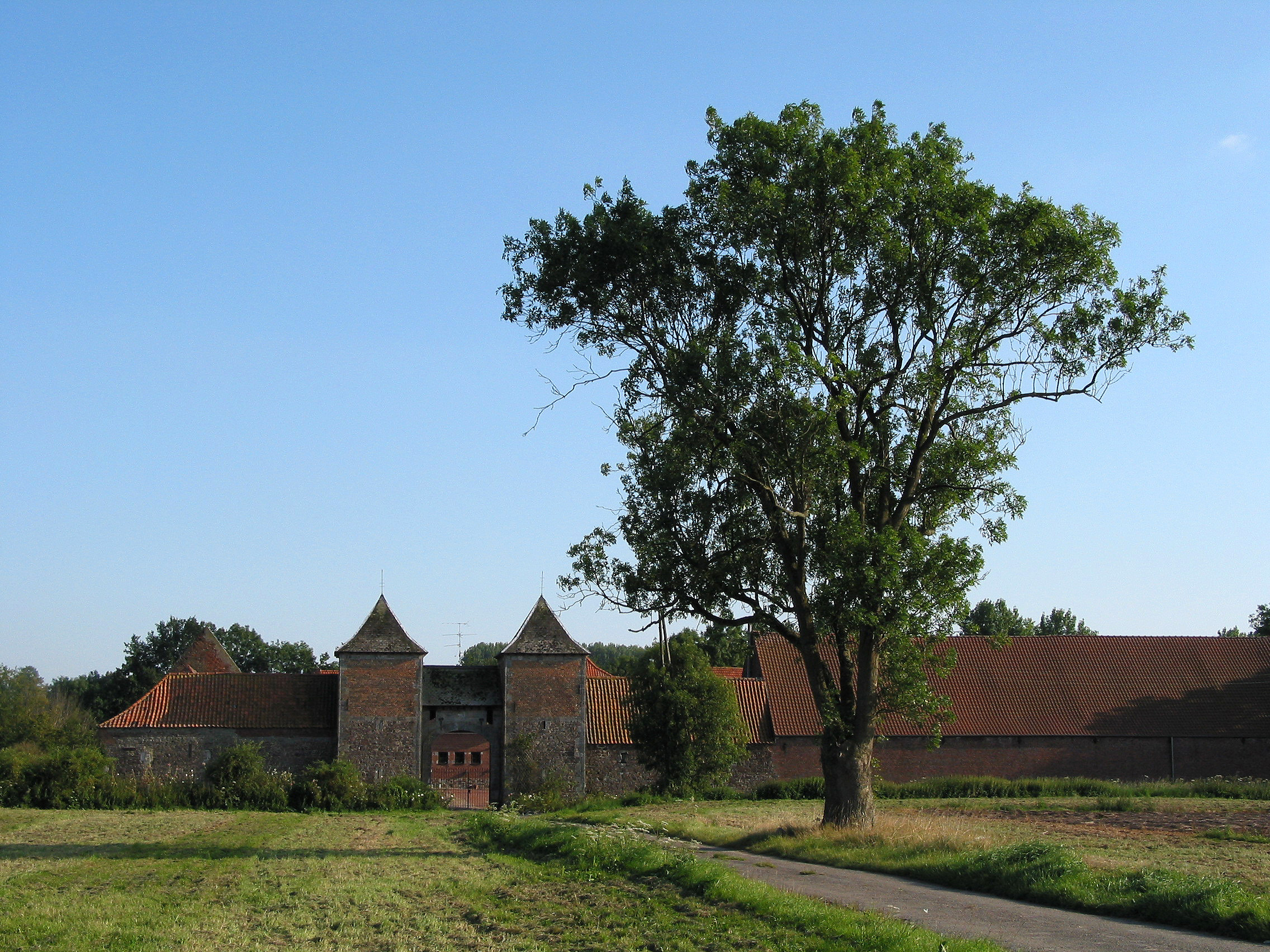
The Rampemont castle-farm

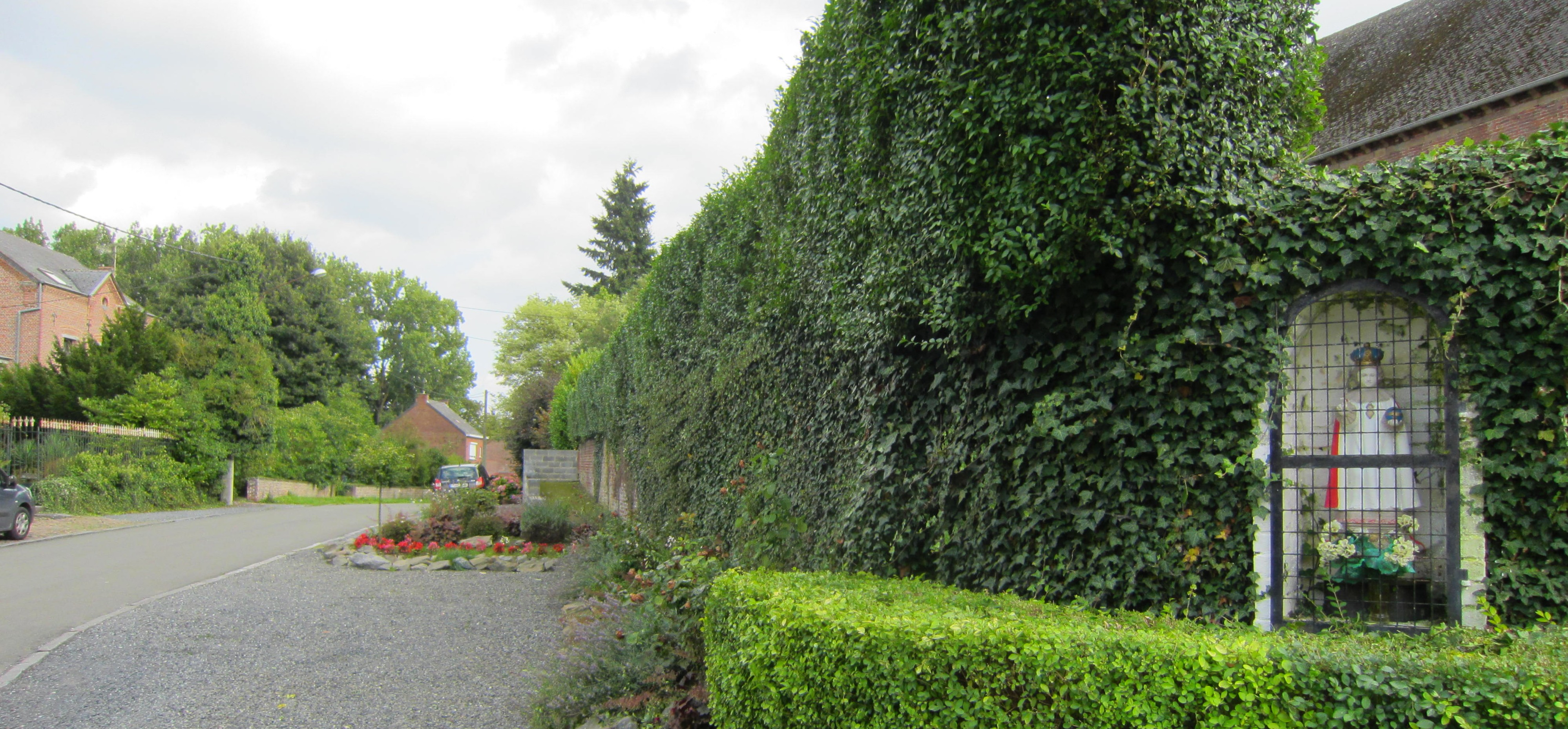
Fayt-le-Franc road

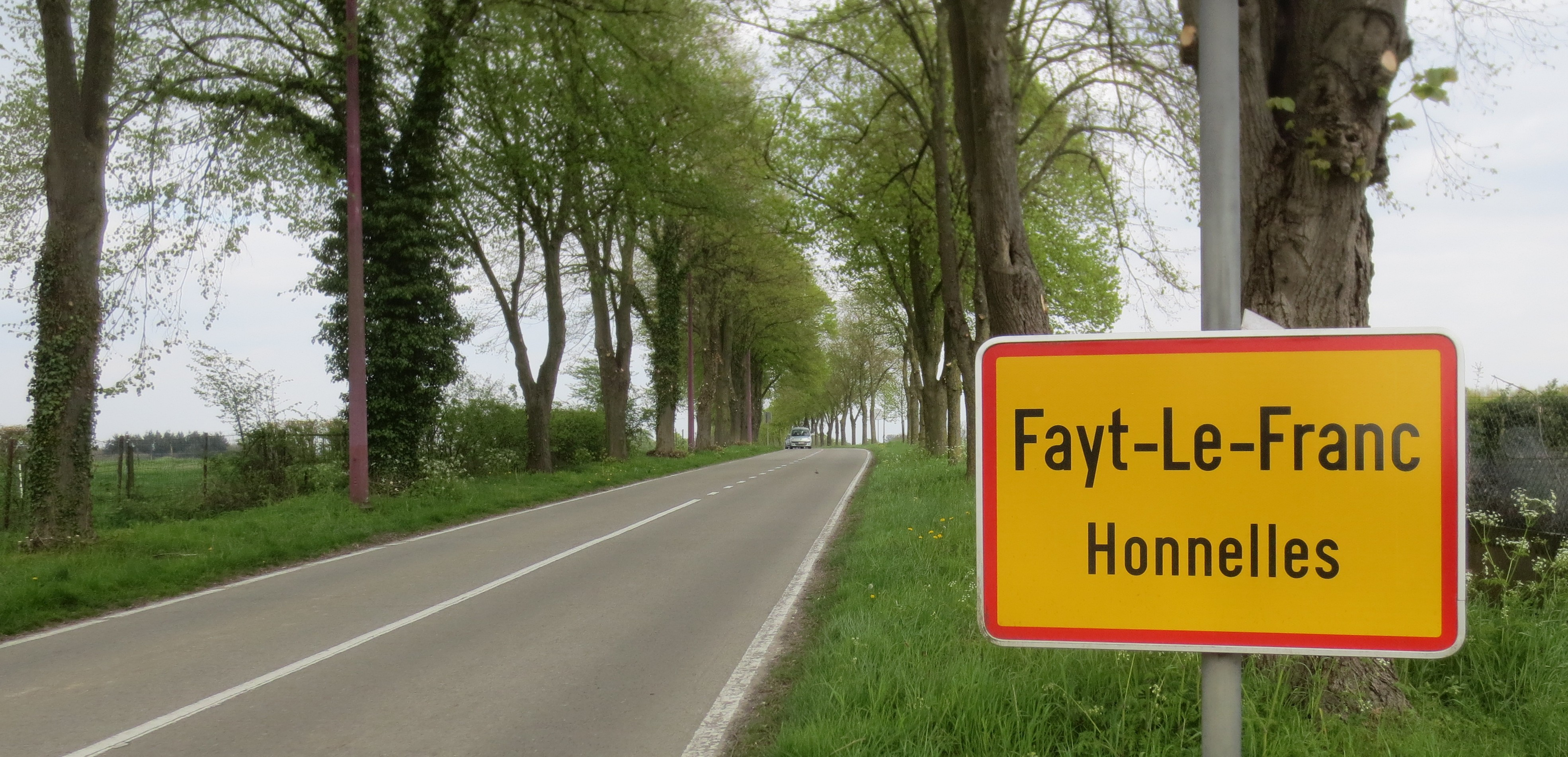
The entrance to Fayt-le-Franc

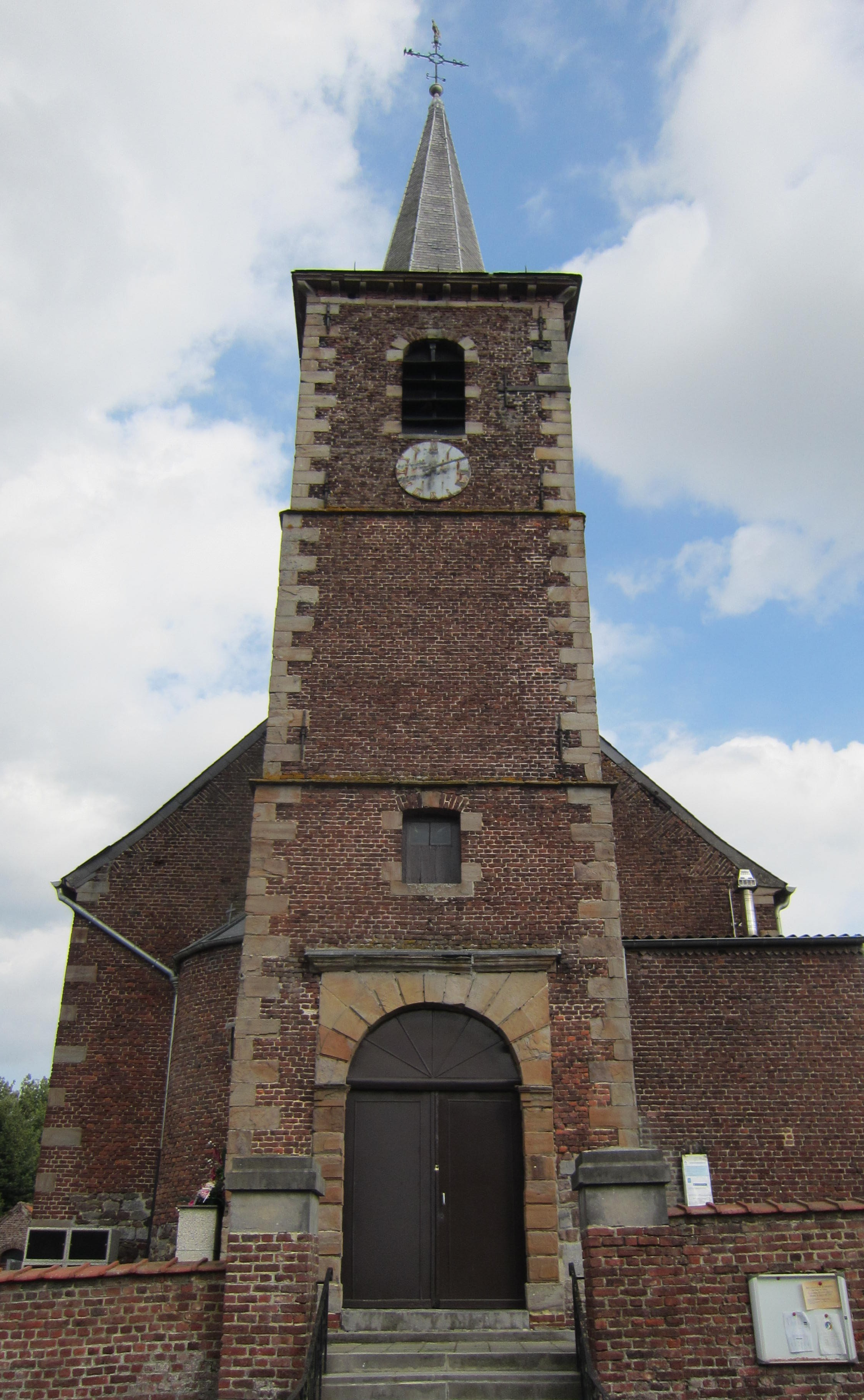
The church of Fayt-le-Franc
