= Honnelles =

Municipality in Hainaut Province, Wallonia, Belgium

Honnelles Onele (Picard)
- Municipality
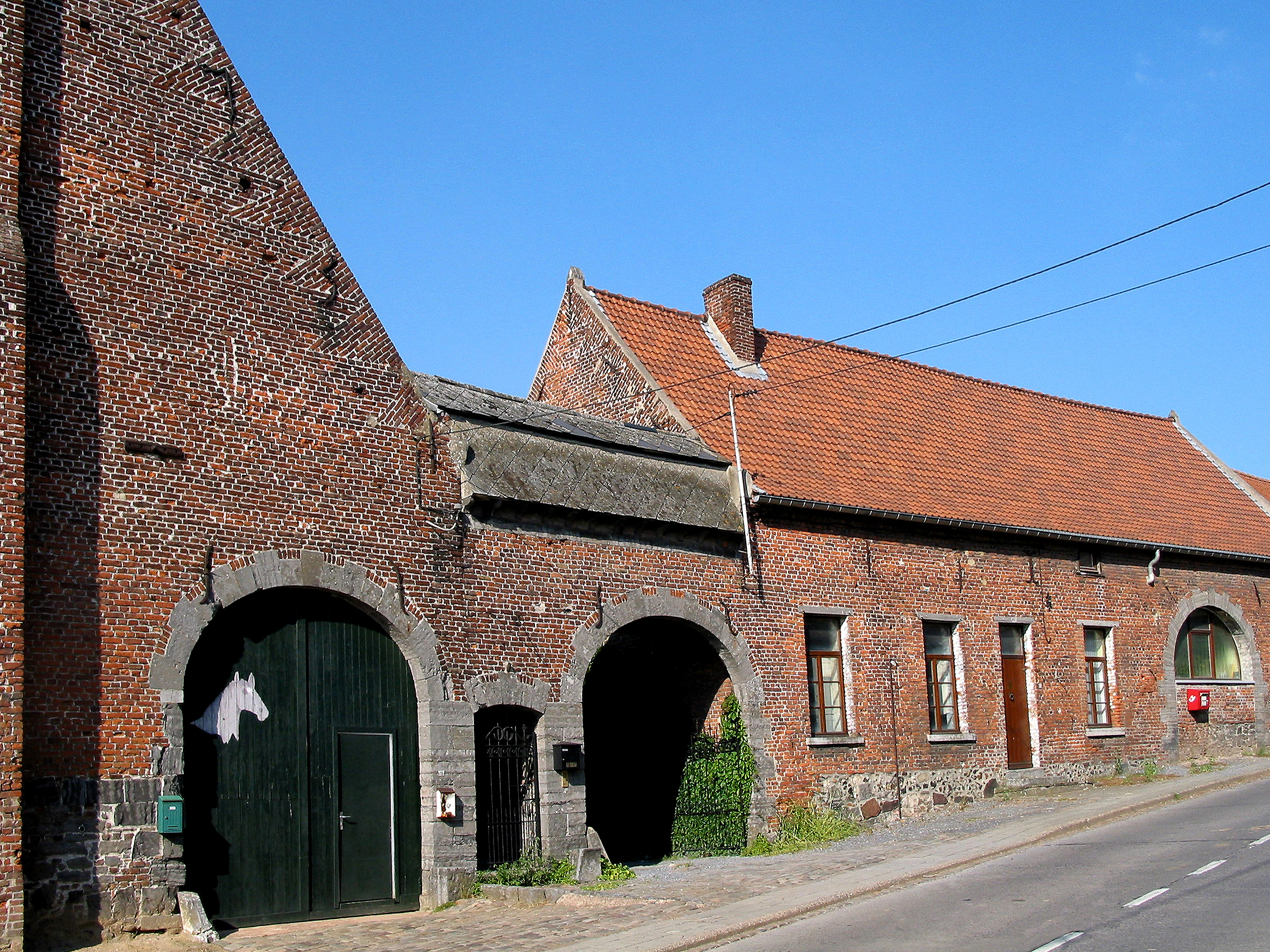
- Angre

- Flag Coat of arms

- Location of Honnelles in Hainaut
- Interactive map of Honnelles
- Location in Belgium
- Coordinates: 50°21′N 03°43′E
- Country: Belgium
- Community: French Community
- Region: Wallonia
- Province: Hainaut
- Arrondissement: Mons

Government
  - Mayor: Matthieu Lemiez (cdH) (PHA)
  - Governing party: Pour Honnelles Autrement (PHA) (cdH + DéFI + MR + Ecolo)

Area
  - Total: 44.27 km^{2} (17.09 sq mi)

Population (2018-01-01)
  - Total: 5,139
  - Density: 116.1/km^{2} (300.7/sq mi)
- Postal codes: 7387
- NIS code: 53083
- Area codes: 065
- Website: www.honnelles.be

Honnelles (French pronunciation: [ɔnɛl]; Picard: Onele) is a municipality of Wallonia located in the province of Hainaut, Belgium.

The name comes from the two rivers which cross the municipality, Grande Honnelle and Petite Honnelle.

On 1 January 2006 Honnelles had a total population of 4,998. The total area is 43.65 km^{2} which gives a population density of 114 inhabitants per km^{2}.

Honnelles is located 18 kilometres (11 mi) southwest of Mons, 16 kilometres (9.9 mi) east of the French city Valenciennes, 50 kilometres (31 mi) west of Charleroi and 72 kilometres (45 mi) southwest of Brussels.

The municipality consists of the following districts: Angre, Angreau, Athis, Autreppe (town centre), Erquennes, Fayt-le-Franc, Marchipont, Montignies-sur-Roc, Onnezies and Roisin.
