= Montignies-sur-Roc =

- Village
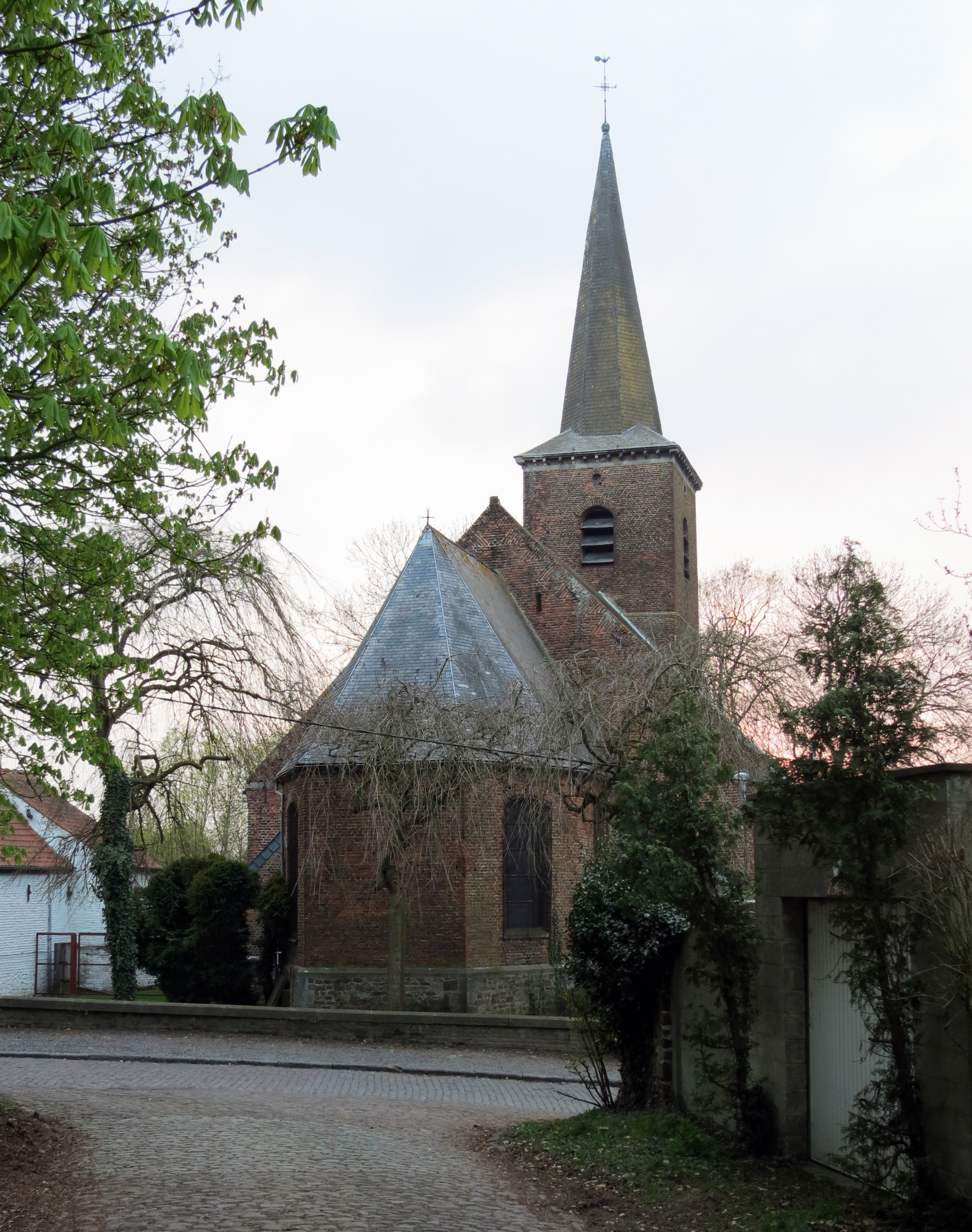
- The church 'Notre-Dame des Rocs

- Location of Montignies-sur-Roc in Honnelles

- Location in Belgium
- Country: Belgium
- Region: Wallonia
- Province: Hainaut
- Municipality: Honnelles
- Postal code: 7387
- Area code: 065

Montignies-sur-Roc (French pronunciation: [mɔ̃tiɲi syʁ ʁɔk]; Walloon: Montniye-so-Rok) is a village of Wallonia and district of the municipality of Honnelles, located in the province of Hainaut, Belgium. The village is located amidst the "Parc naturel des Hauts-Pays". The village is located near the French border, along the river la Petite Honnelle. The village is home to the Brasserie de l'Abbaye des Rocs, a brewery where Abbaye des Rocs, Blanche de Honnelles, Montagnards and Altitude 6 are brewed. Points of interest in the village include a watermill from 1758, a Notre-Dame Church from the 18th century, and a small artificial cave, Calvary, built in the 18th century.

== See also ==
- Brasserie des Rocs (brewery)
