= Athis, Honnelles =

Athis
- Village
- Location of Athis in Honnelles

- Location in Belgium
- Coordinates: 50°21′53″N 3°46′34″E
- Country: Belgium
- Region: Wallonia
- Province: Hainaut
- Municipality: Honnelles
- Postal code: 7387
- Area code: 065

Athis (Walloon: Atisse) is a village of Wallonia and district of the municipality of Honnelles, located in the province of Hainaut, Belgium.
