= Angre, Honnelles =

Angre Angue (Picard)
- Village
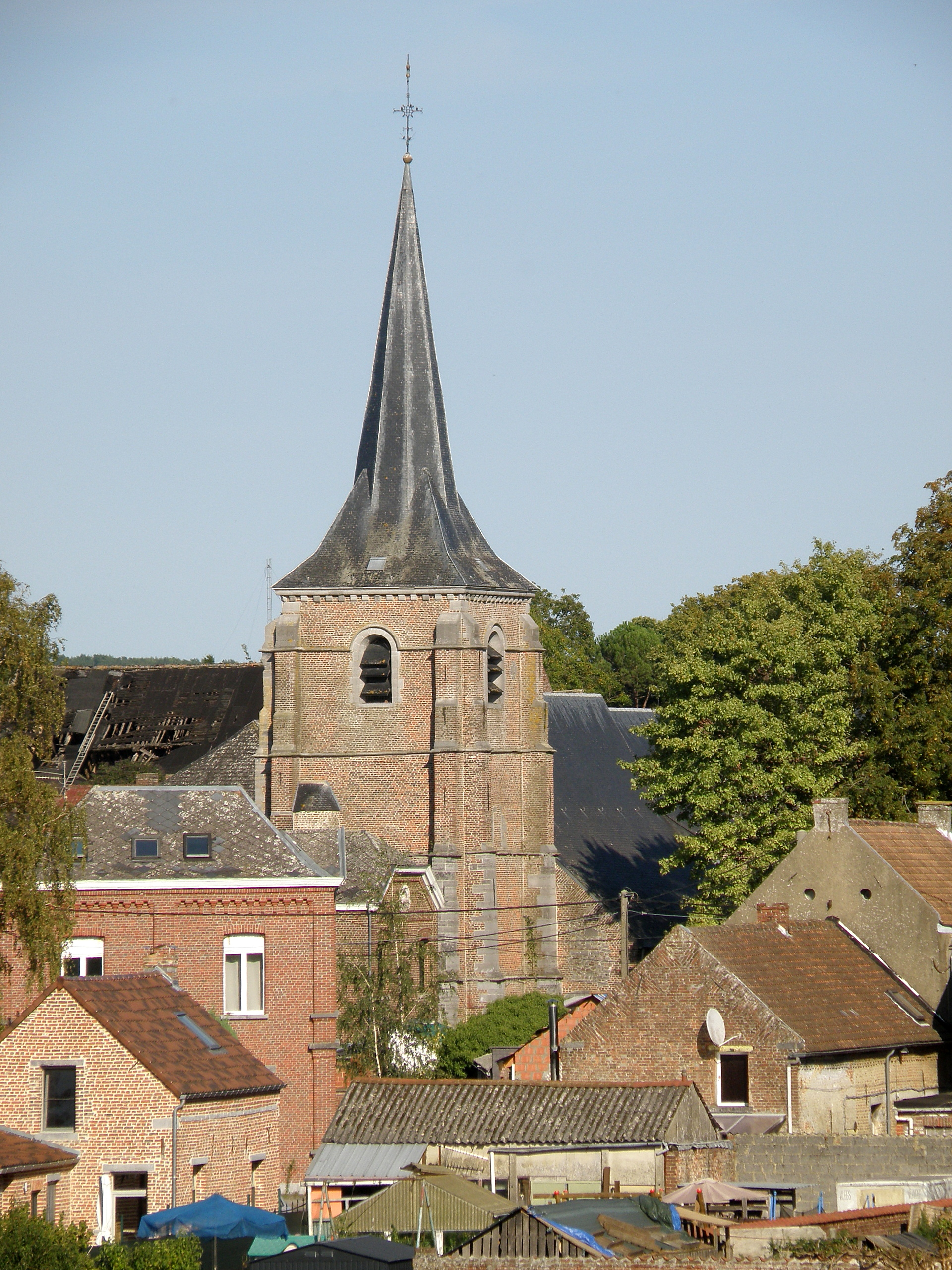
- Village with Saint Martin's Church

- Location of Angre in Honnelles

- Location in Belgium
- Coordinates: 50°22′01″N 3°41′44″E
- Country: Belgium
- Region: Wallonia
- Province: Hainaut
- Municipality: Honnelles
- Postal code: 7387
- Area code: 065

Angre (French pronunciation: [ɑ̃ɡʁ]; Picard: Angue) is a village of Wallonia and district of the municipality of Honnelles, located in the province of Hainaut, Belgium.

== Tourist Curiosities ==
Located in the forest of Bois d'Angre along the Grande Honnelle river, the Caillou-qui-bique is a 25 m high quartz puddingstone, resembling the shape of a human face. It is 370 million years old. According to the old popular beliefs, most of these rocks have a diabolical origin, in this case, the Devil's work:

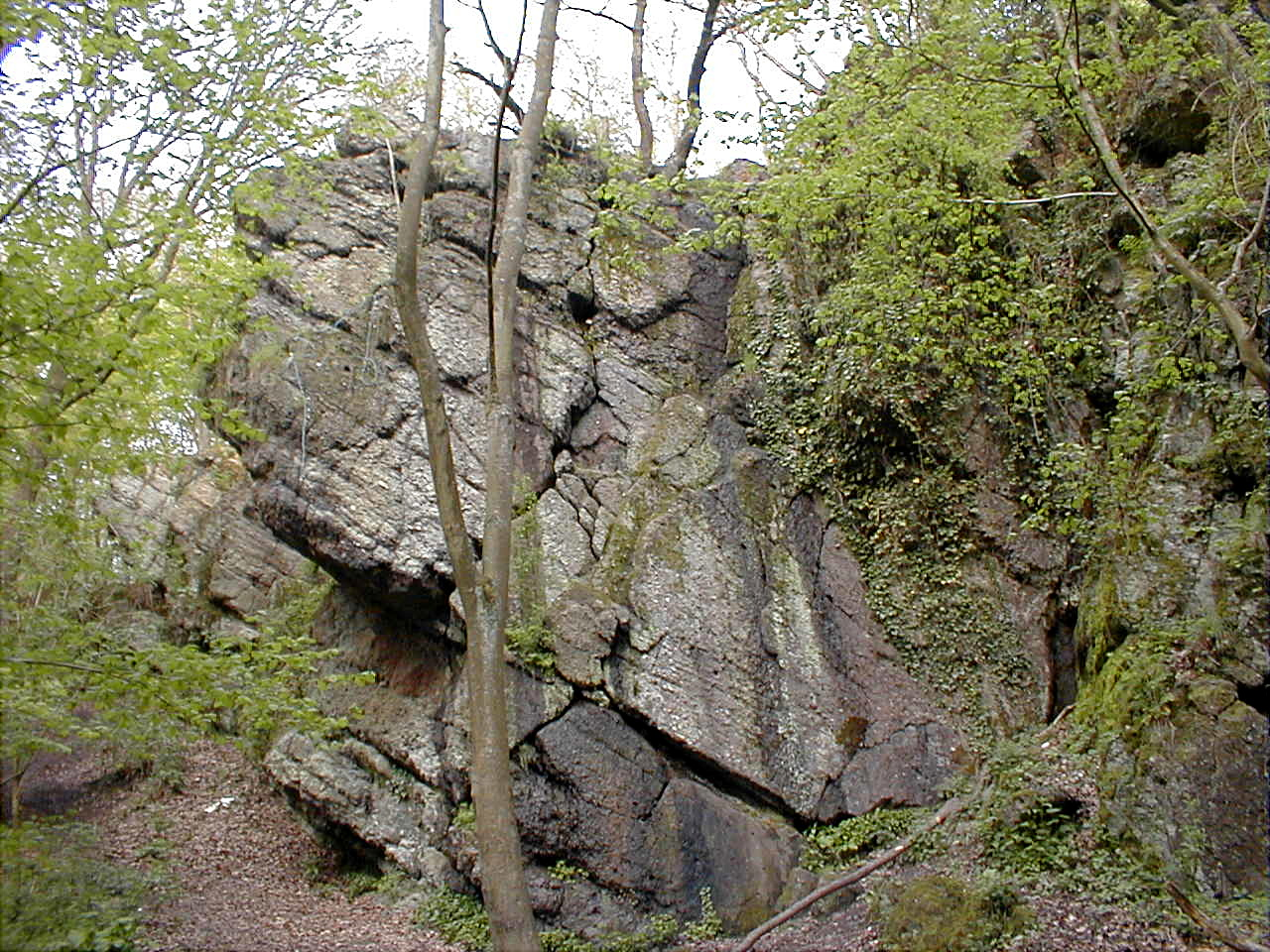
The Caillou-qui-bique, located in Angre Woods

Satan could not abide that Saint Remacle was building the Abbey of Stavelot. To prevent the inauguration, he departed from the Pyrenees mountains with a huge rock on his back, to throw it at the church. But along the way, he met a poor man who told him that the road was still long. Discouraged and angry at not being able to arrive in time to spoil the festivities, the devil dropped his rock in anger and it embedded itself in the ground. This rock, which seems to have been balancing since the dawn of time, is the Caillou-qui-Bique!
