= Andiron =

Support to hold logs in an open fireplace

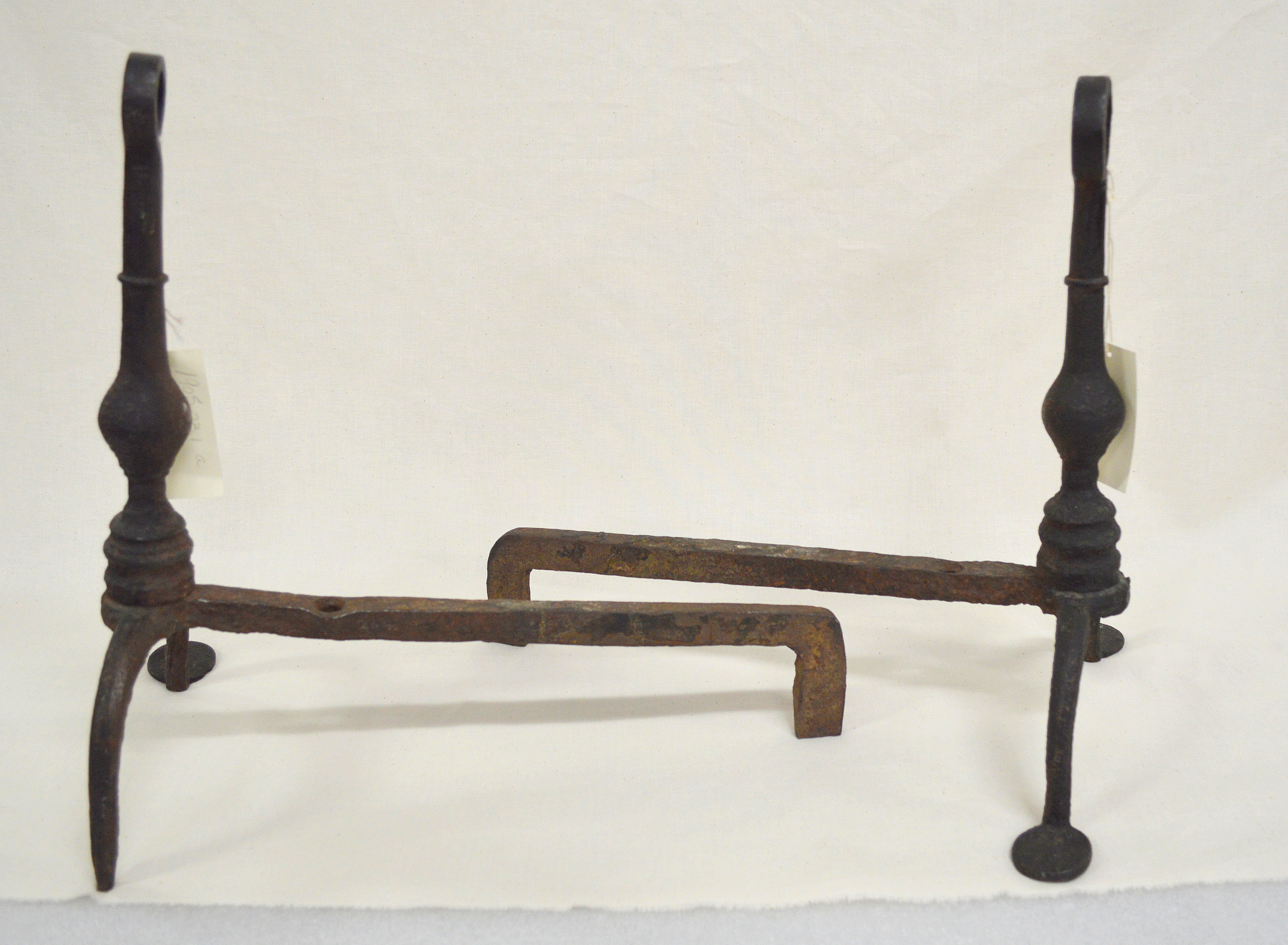
A pair of simple wrought-iron andirons, 1780s, America

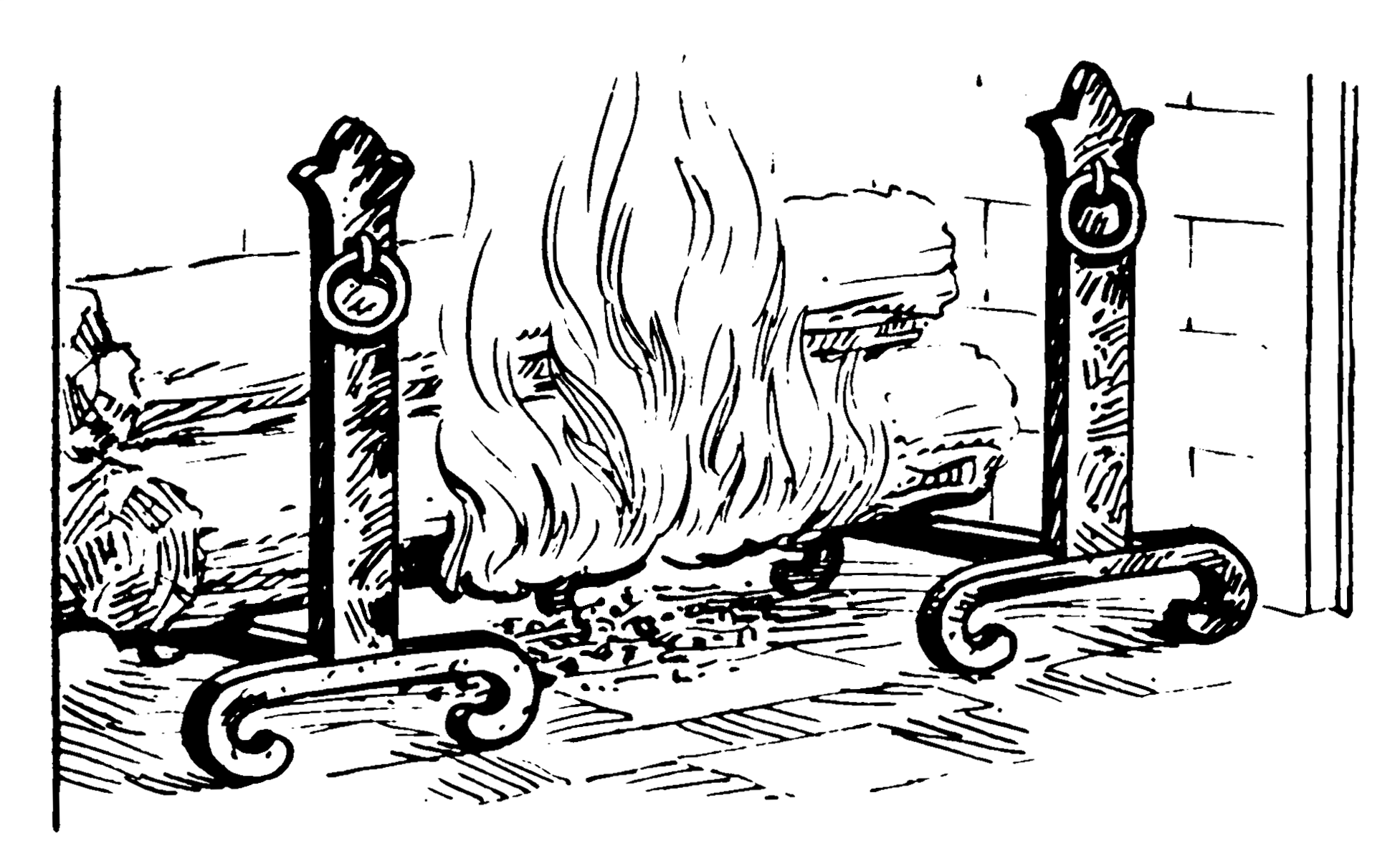
A drawing of andirons in use

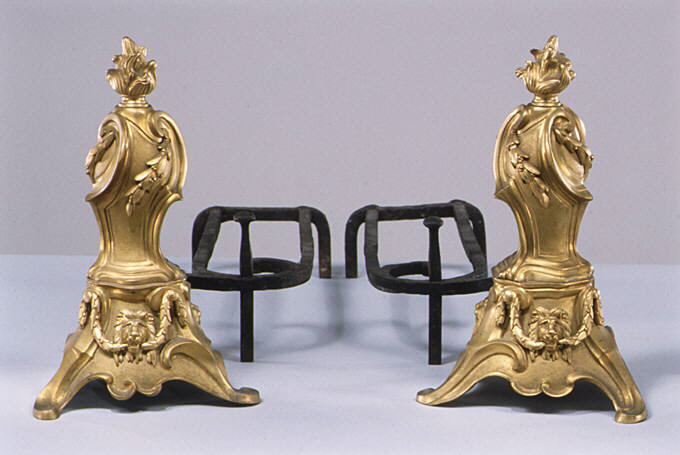
French, late 18th century. Gilt-bronze fronts, with wrought iron behind

An andiron, firedog, fire-dog, fire dog, iron-dog, or chenet is a bracket support, normally one of a pair, on which logs are laid for burning in an open fireplace, so that air may circulate under the firewood, allowing better burning and less smoke. They generally consist of a tall vertical element at the front, with at least two legs. This stops the logs from rolling out into the room, and may be highly decorative. The other element is one or more low horizontal pieces stretching back into the fireplace and serving to hold the logs off the bottom of the fireplace. An andiron is sometimes called a dog or dog-iron.

Before the Renaissance, European andirons, almost invariably made entirely of iron, were of comparatively plain design. Indeed, andirons and firebacks were one of the first types of object commonly made in cast iron (introduced to the West in the 15th century), a trend which in England began in the 1540s: until the nineteenth century cast iron was too brittle for many uses, but andirons carried light loads and this was not a problem. However, from the Renaissance onwards the front vertical element of andirons was increasingly given decorative treatment, and was in a different metal, such as brass, bronze or silver, which allowed casting, hugely increasing the range of decorative possibilities. When metals that could be cast began to be used for the fronts, these ordinary objects of the household received the attention of the artist, and had skill and taste lavished upon them. Thus English late 17th-century andirons often have elaborate flat brass front-pieces, often in openwork and sometimes using enamel for further decoration.

By the eighteenth century classical forms with several mouldings, similar to those used for candlesticks and the like, predominate in pieces for the middle classes, and were imitated in the American colonies, often just in iron and rather more simply. Small figures at the front also became popular; in America cast flat "Hessian" soldiers were a long-lasting favourite. In Continental Europe, men such as Jean Berain (1640-1711), whose artistry was most especially applied to the ornamentation of Boulle furniture, sometimes designed them. The Algardi Firedogs commissioned from the Roman sculptor Alessandro Algardi for Philip IV of Spain by Velázquez in 1650 were copied in several foundries.

The andiron reached its greatest artistic development under Louis XIV of France (r. 1643–1715). From the eighteenth century, fireplaces increasingly had built-in metal grates to hold the firewood, or, increasingly, the coal, up off the floor and in place, thus largely removing the need for andirons. However, andirons were often still kept for decorative reasons, and sometimes as a place to rest pokers, tongs and other fire implements. In older periods people used andirons as a rest for a roasting spit; they sometimes included a cup-shaped top to hold porridge. Sometimes, smaller pairs were placed between the main andirons for smaller fires. These are called "creepers".

== Usage ==
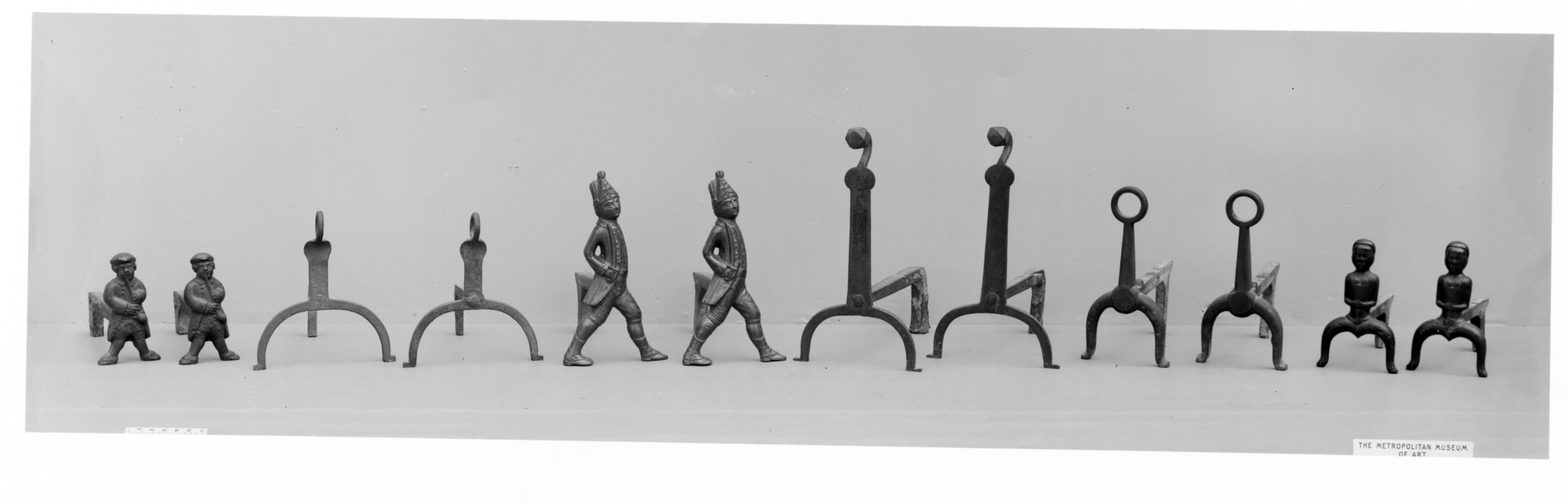
American iron firedogs, 1770–1800. Hessians at 3rd from left

Andirons and fire dogs are devices made of metal and (rarely) ceramic which support the firewood. They normally stand upon short legs and are usually connected with an upright guard. The guard keeps the logs in the fireplace as they burn and settle. This guard, which may be of iron, steel, copper, bronze, or silver, may be simple, or elaborately ornamented (often with patterns or heraldic ornaments, such as the fleur-de-lis, with sphinxes, grotesque animals, mythological statuettes, or caryatides supporting heroic figures or emblems). A common decoration in the form of a canine plays on the dual meanings of the word dog (canine and inanimate holder or blocker).

== Etymology ==
Pair of French Rococo andiron fronts, with boars heads. Gilt bronze.

The word andiron was borrowed into Middle English from the Old French word andier (also found in medieval Latin in forms such as andena, anderia, anderius). The origin of the French word is uncertain. But in English the word soon became associated with the word iron through folk-etymology, producing the form andiron. Sometimes this was further folk-etymologised as hand-iron. Due to the reanalysis of the French form l'andier ('the andiron') as one word, the French term later became landier, giving rise to English forms such as landiron.

The term firedog seems to arise from the perceived similarity of an andiron to a dog lying by the fire. In English, however, this form may also have been influenced by French: another French term for an andiron is chenet, which originally meant 'little dog'.

== History ==
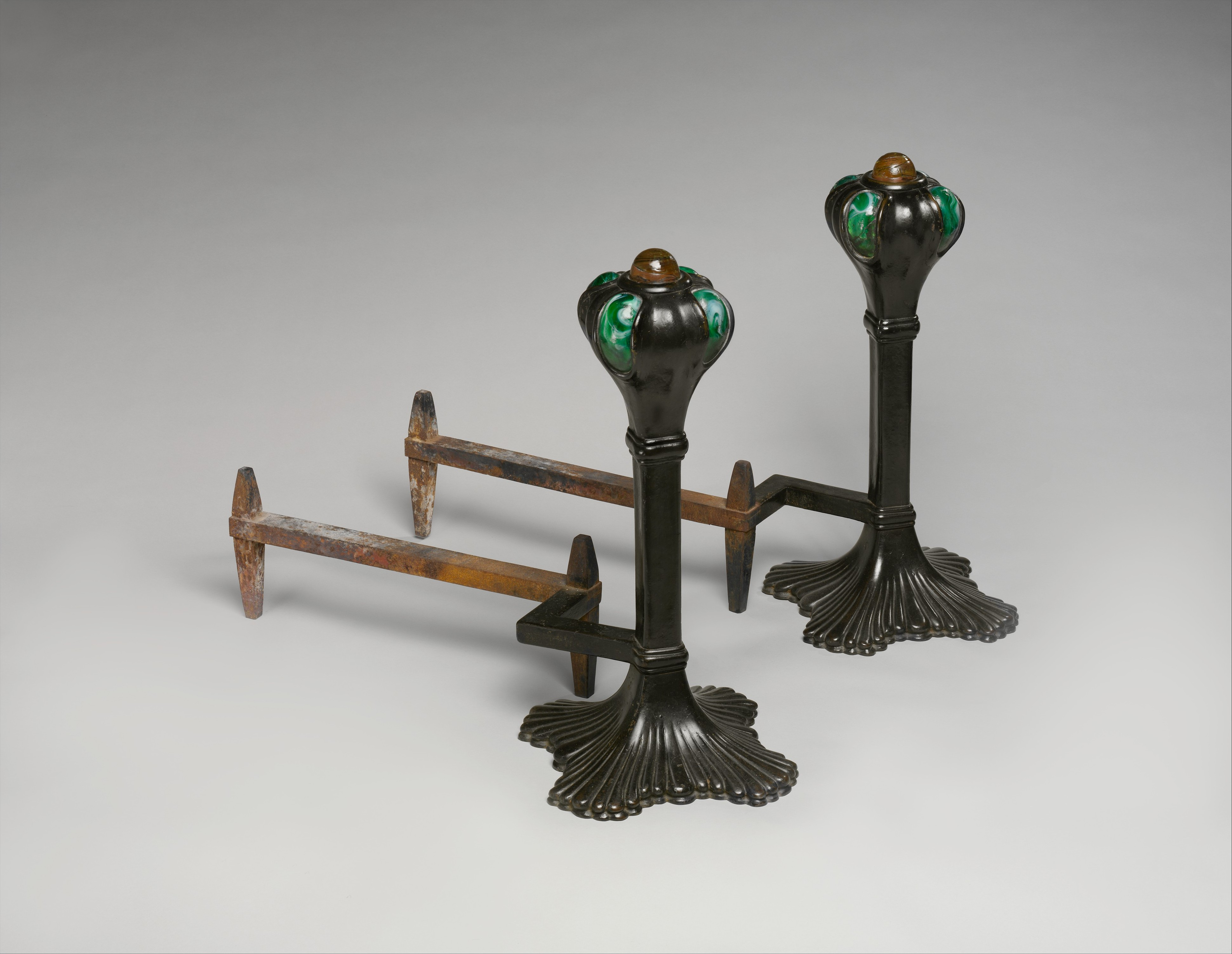
Pair of andirons, by Louis Comfort Tiffany, 1894, bronze, glass and iron, 63.5 × 38.1 × 88.9 cm

Andirons, or fire dogs, had been in use by the Ancient Greeks, and were called krateutai (Greek: κρατευταί). Excavations made on the Greek island of Santorini unearthed stone sets of firedogs used before the seventeenth century BC. In each pair of the supports, the receptacles to hold skewers or spits were found in equivalence, while the line of small openings in the base formed a mechanism to supply the coals with oxygen so that they remained alight during its use.

Fire dogs were also referred to as moon idols (or moon horns) in antiquity. They may also refer to an artifact-type of late Bronze Age Europe (c. 1300 to 800 BC). Typically made of clay, they have been found in areas of modern France, Switzerland and Germany; often associated with the Urnfield culture. This naming suggests that moon idols could have been used as andirons to build up fire dogs.

In some cases, moon idols are a cult item of Early European Religions, resembling a pair of horns or crescent moons on a pedestal, and were variously interpreted as testifying to bull worship, Moon worship, or as a holder for wooden logs to be used in a fire altar.

Medieval andirons tended to be high, often with slots at the front for placing spits for roasting; in later periods similar styles remained in use in large kitchens. When the Italian Renaissance began to produce very elaborate decorated fronts for reception rooms, these remained higher than later, gradually tending to reduce in height until the 18th century.

Firedogs with little or no ornamentation and made of metal or ceramics were used in kitchens, with ratcheted uprights for the spits. Very often these uprights branched out into arms, or hobs, for stewing or keeping food hot.

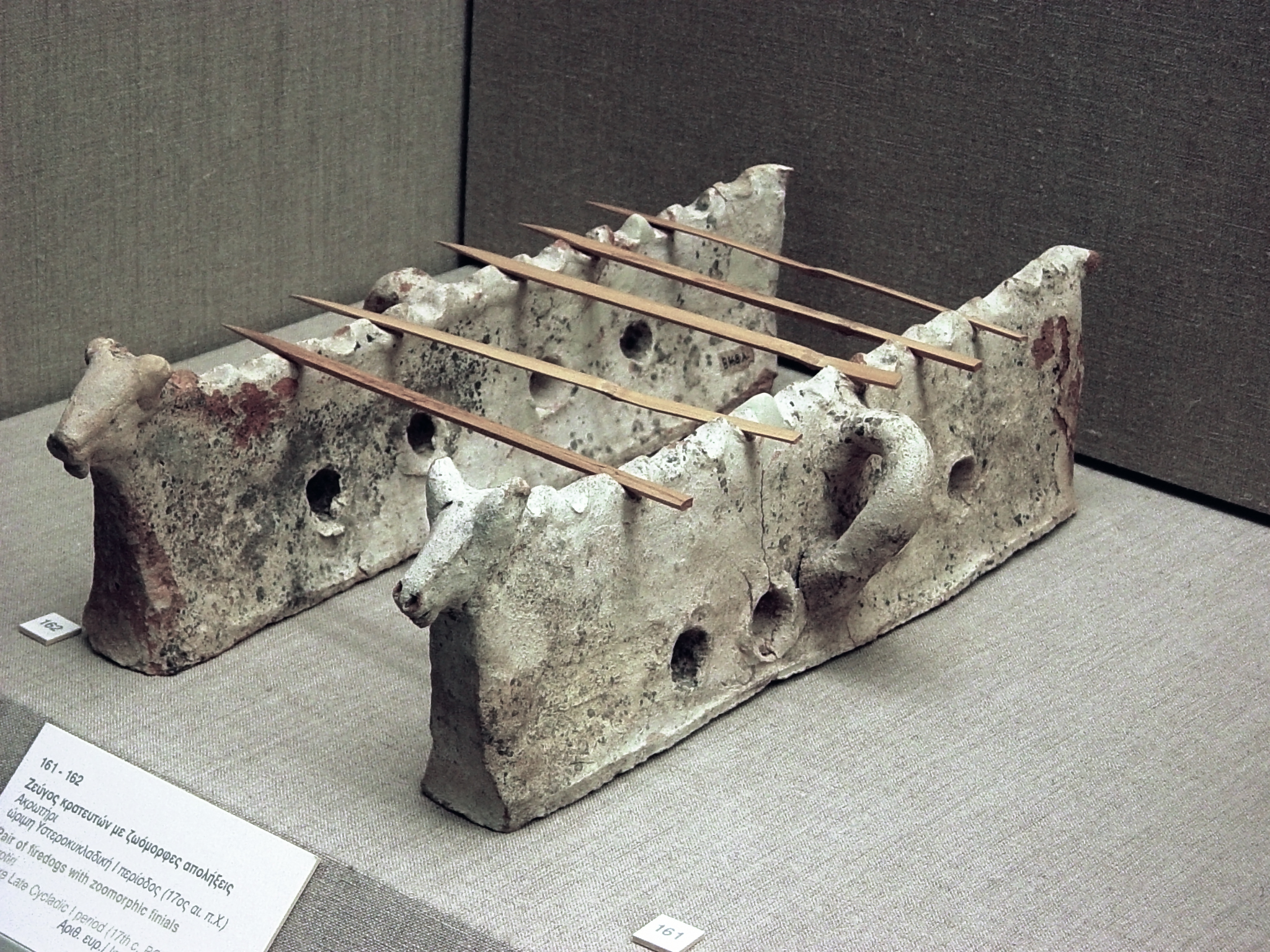
Pair of firedogs with zoomorphic finials and slots for placing skewers, 17th century BC, Akrotiri

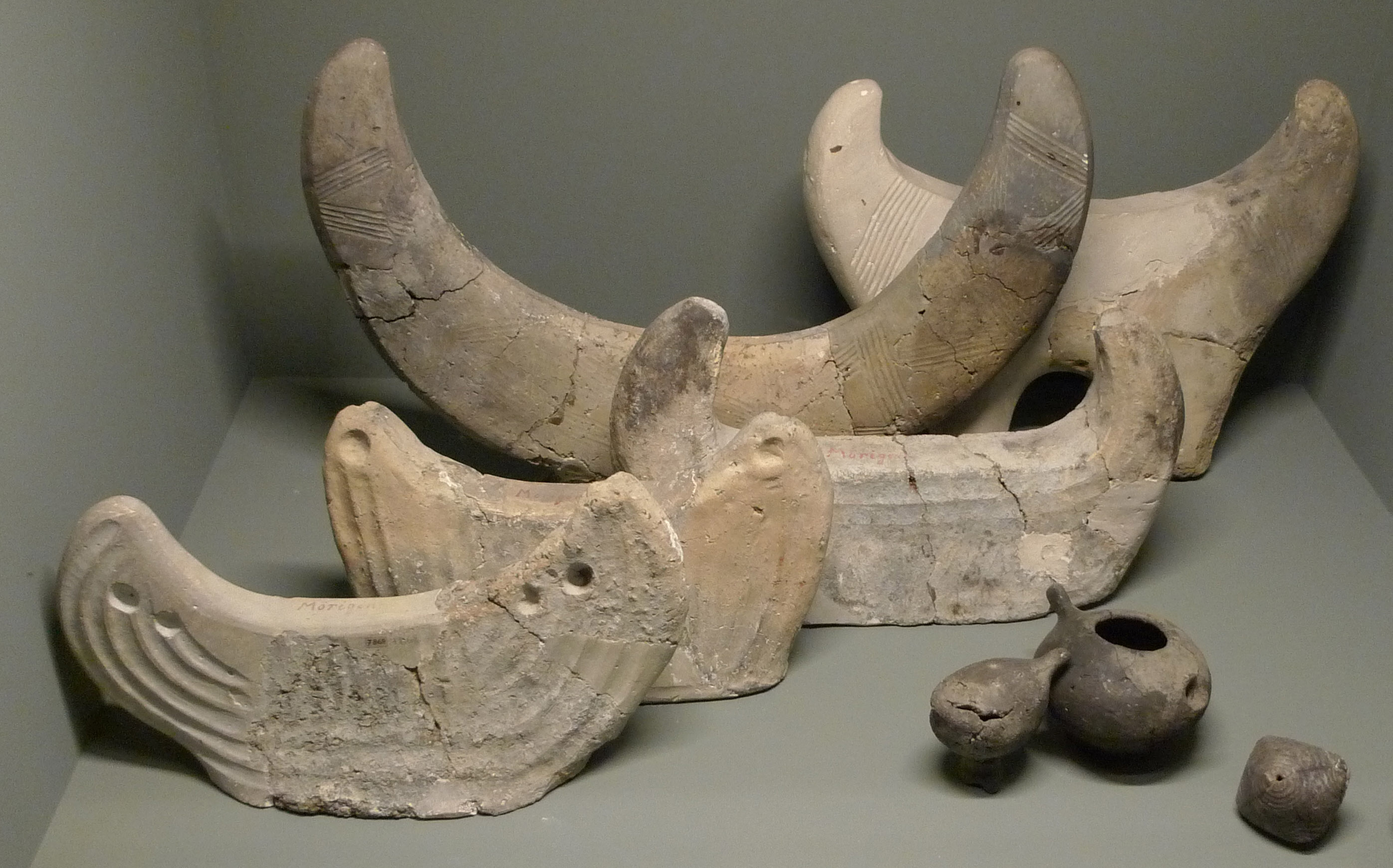
Firedogs shaped like animal horns, c. 900–800 BC, Switzerland

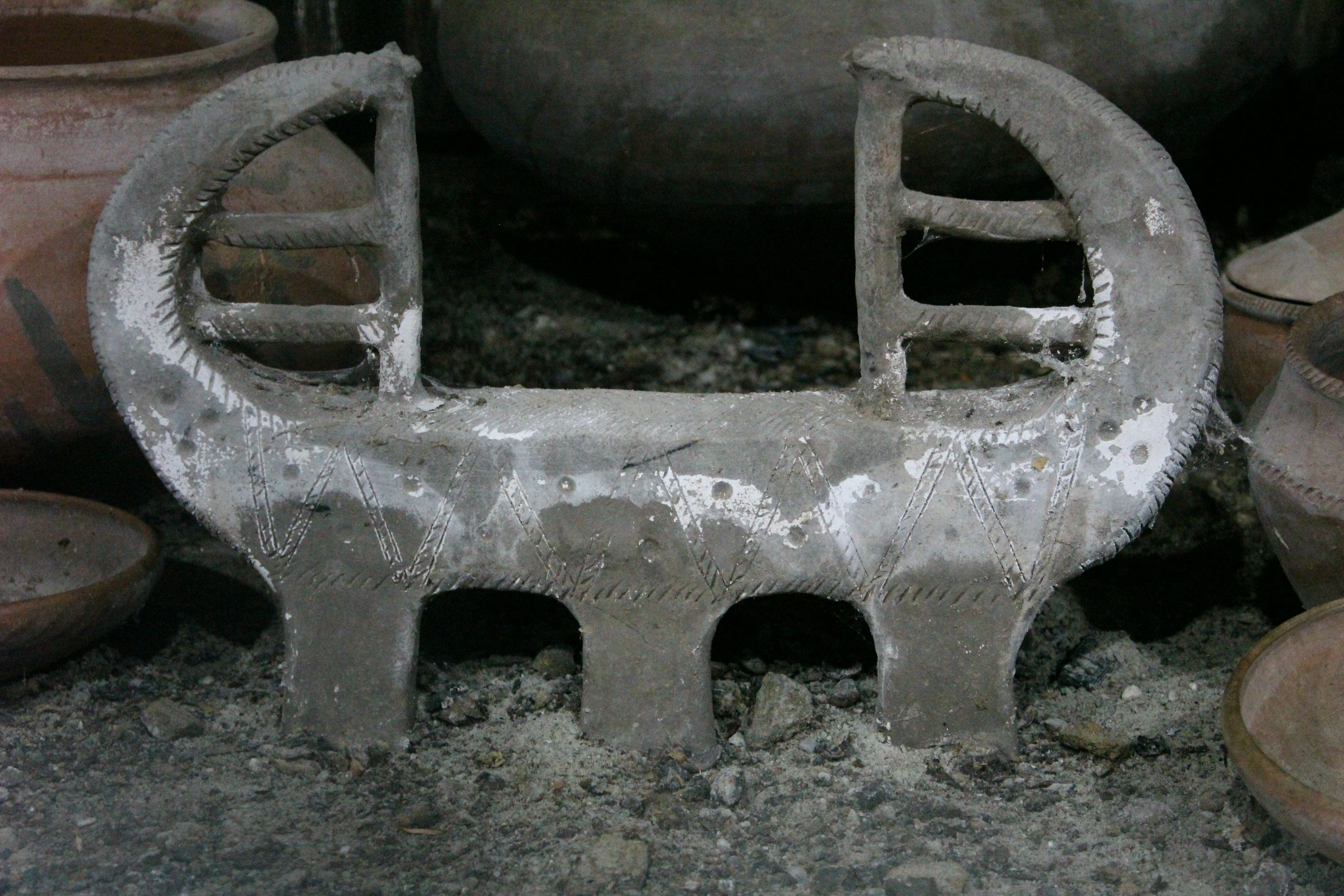
Firedog (moon idol) c. 700 BC, Sopron, Hungary

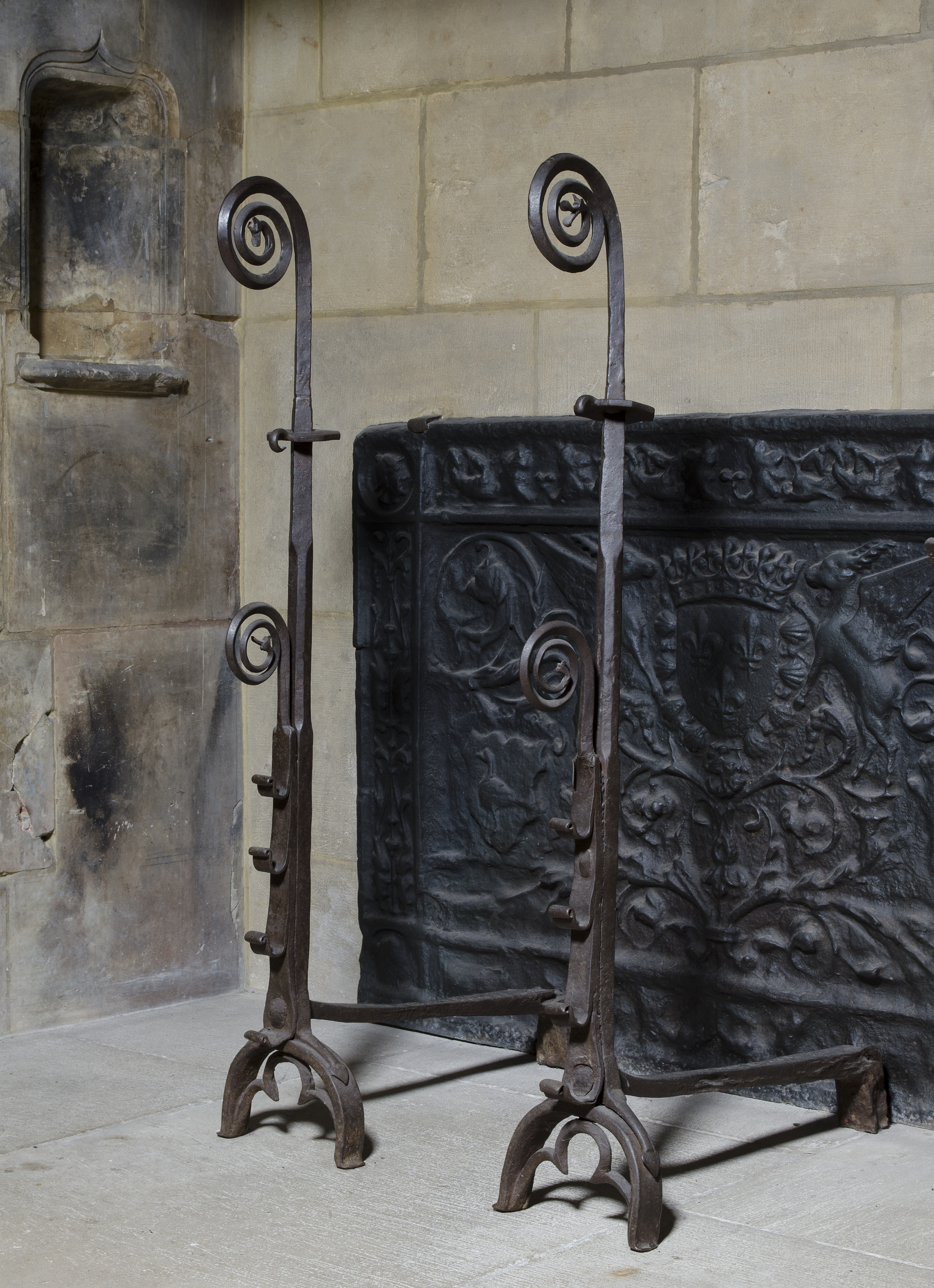
Medieval French andirons, around 1400, with rests for roasting spits

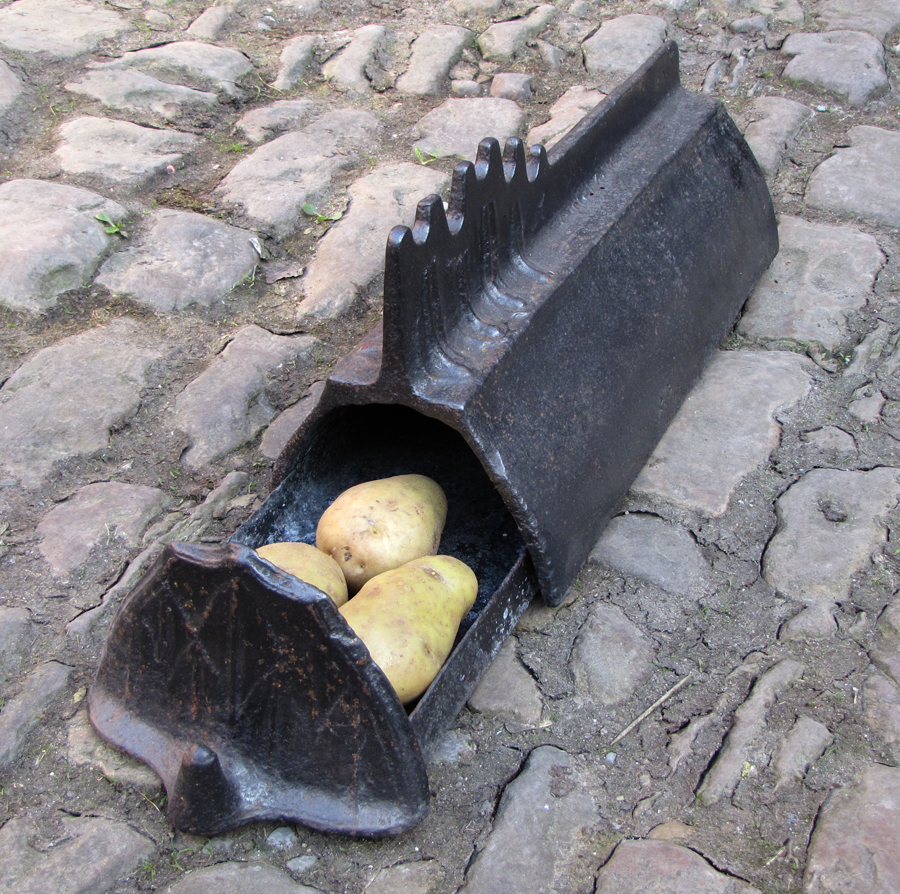
A firedog with baking drawer, 19th century, Gourmet Museum, Belgium

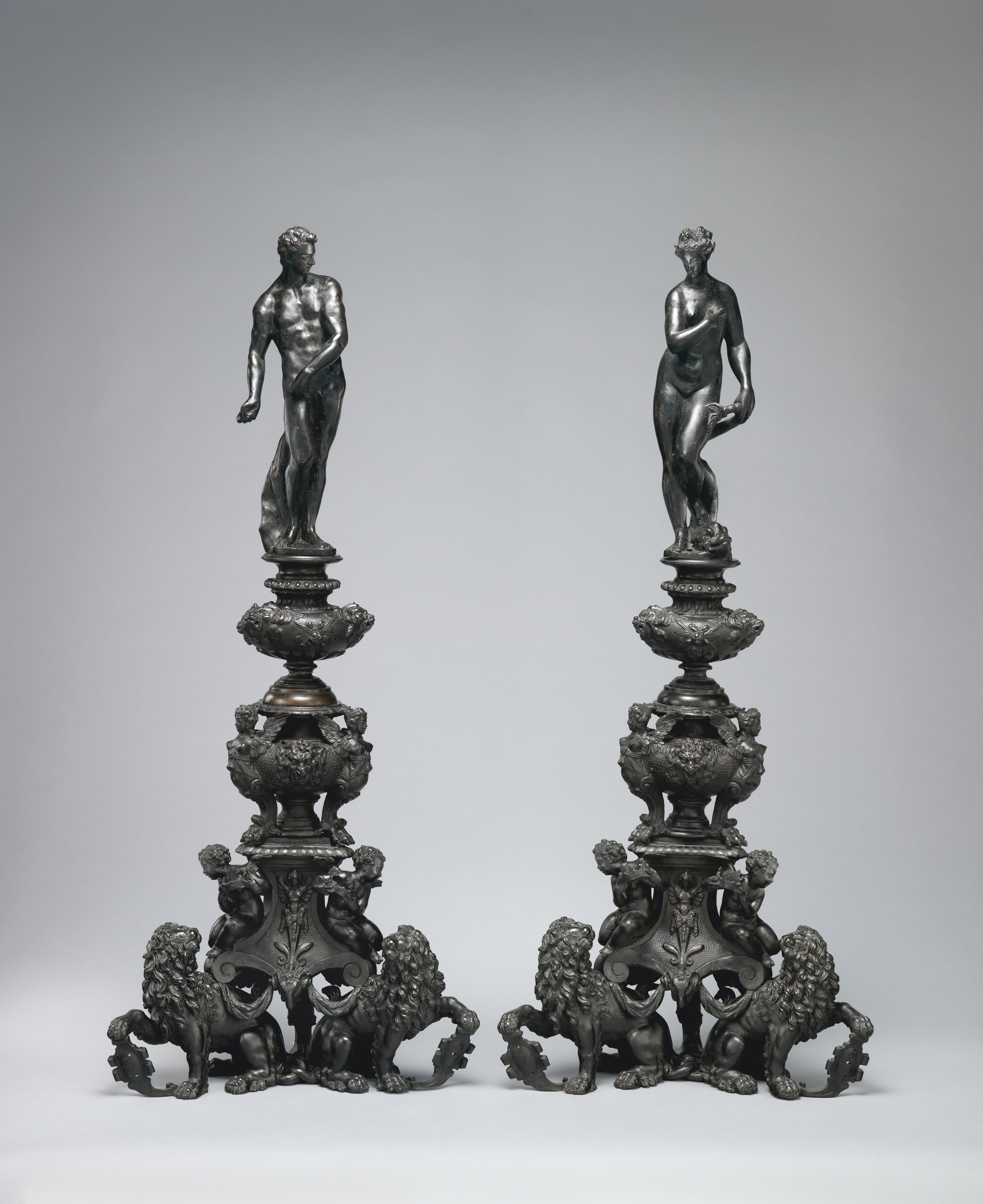
Pair of Italian andiron fronts, around 1600

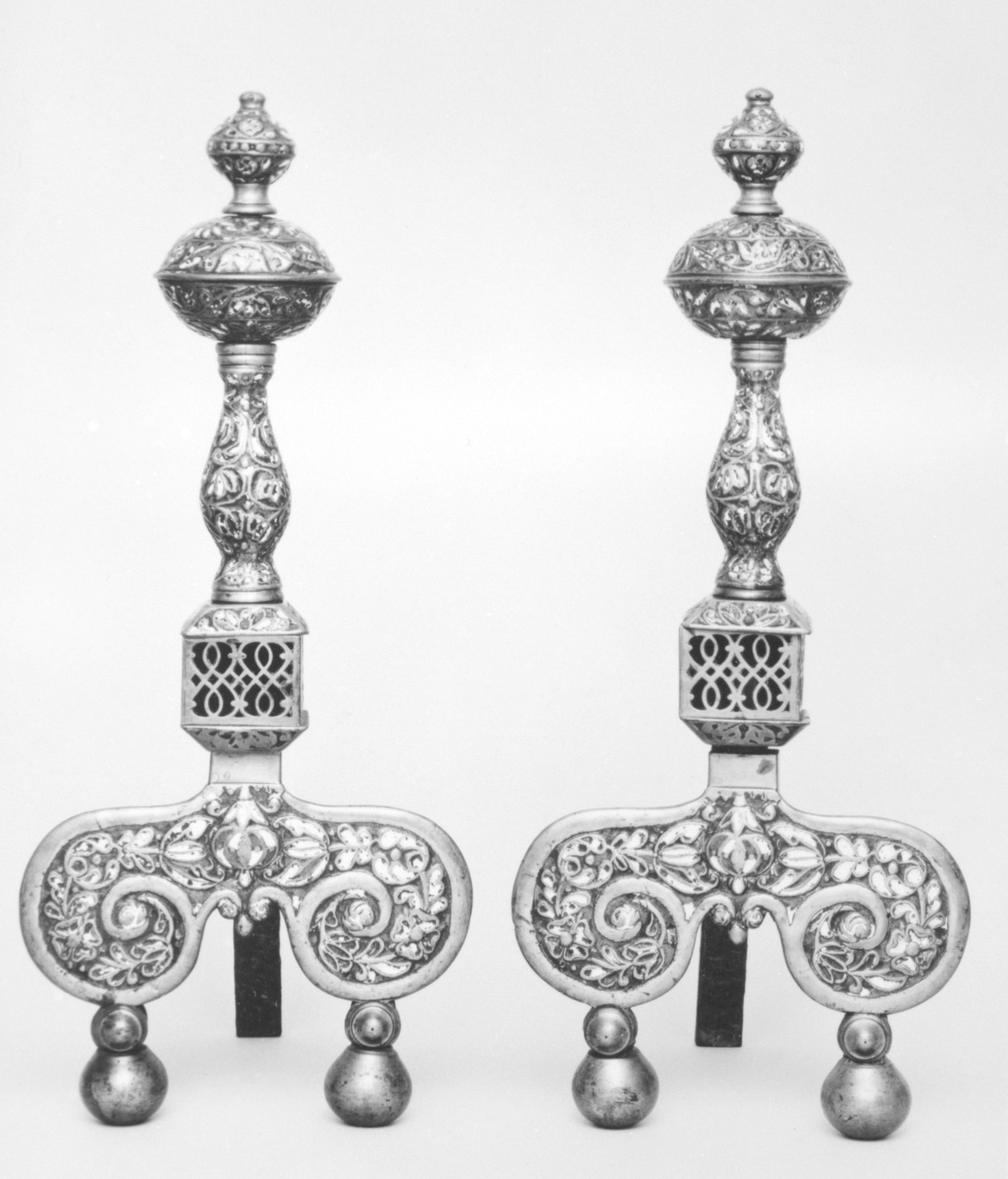
English brass and enamel andirons, c. 1680

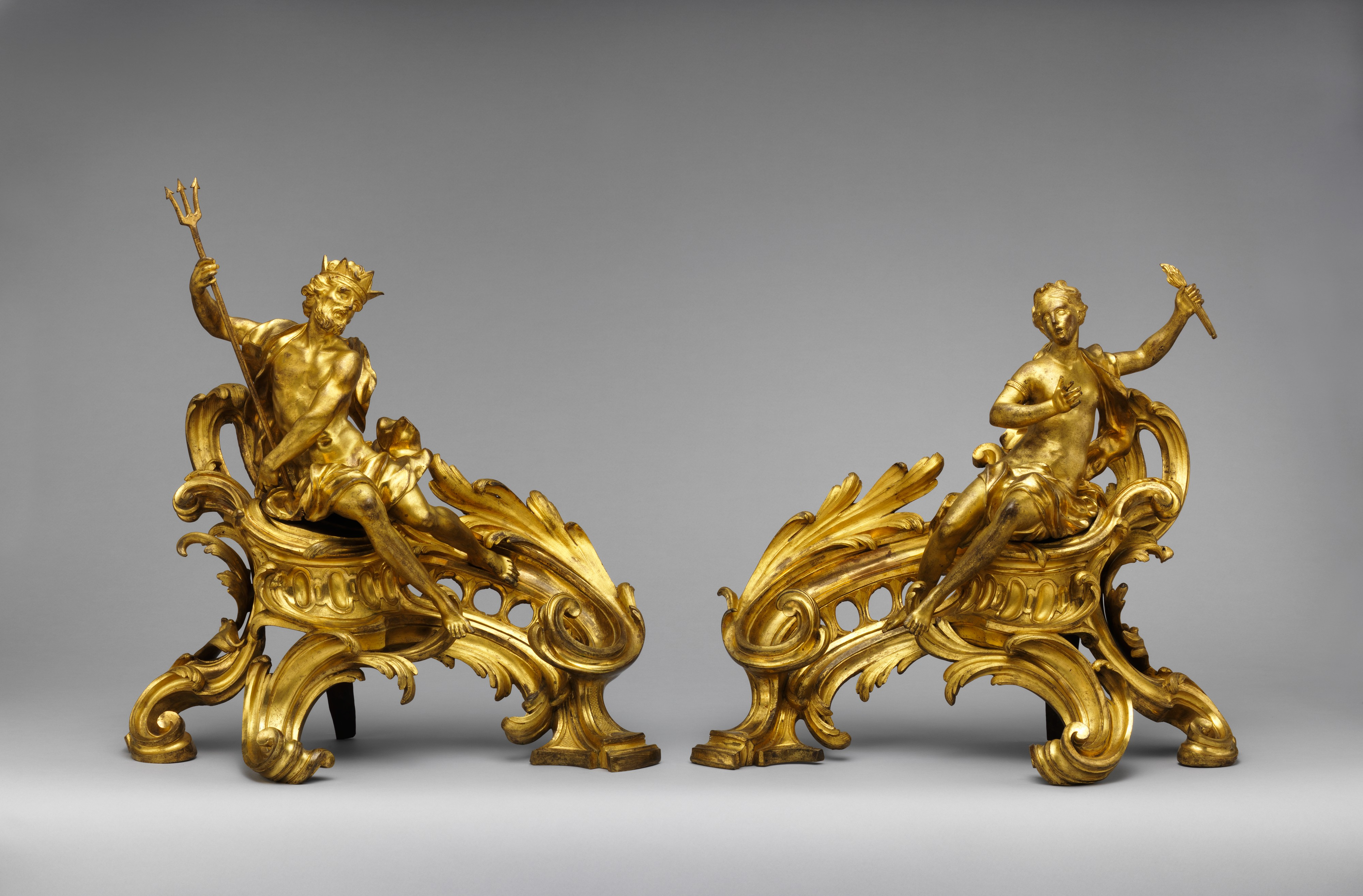
Pair of French Rococo andirons; circa 1750; gilt bronze; dimensions of the first: 52.7 × 48.3 × 26.7 cm, of the second: 45.1 × 49.1 × 24.8 cm; Metropolitan Museum of Art (New York City)

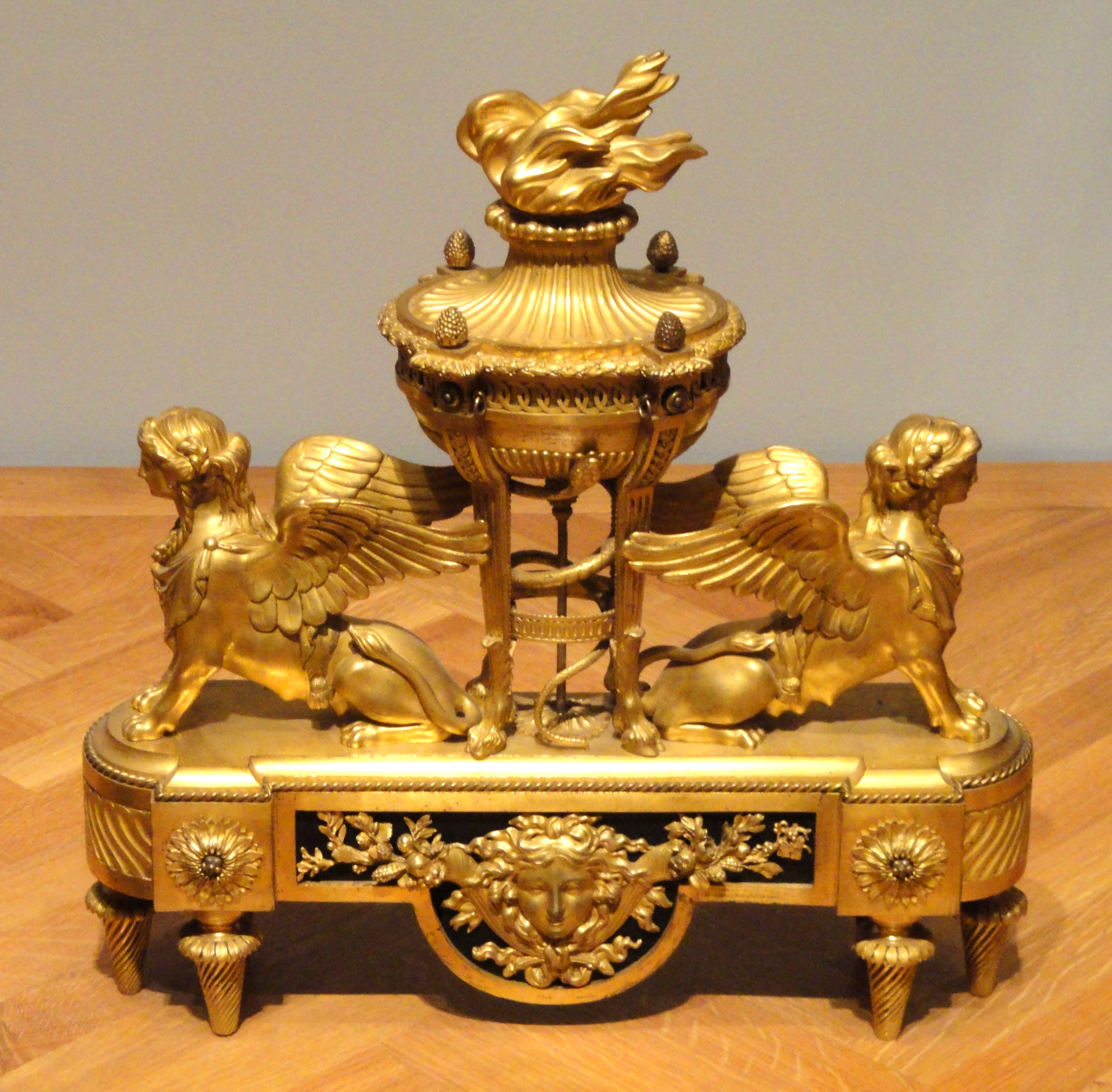
About 1785, France, gilt bronze

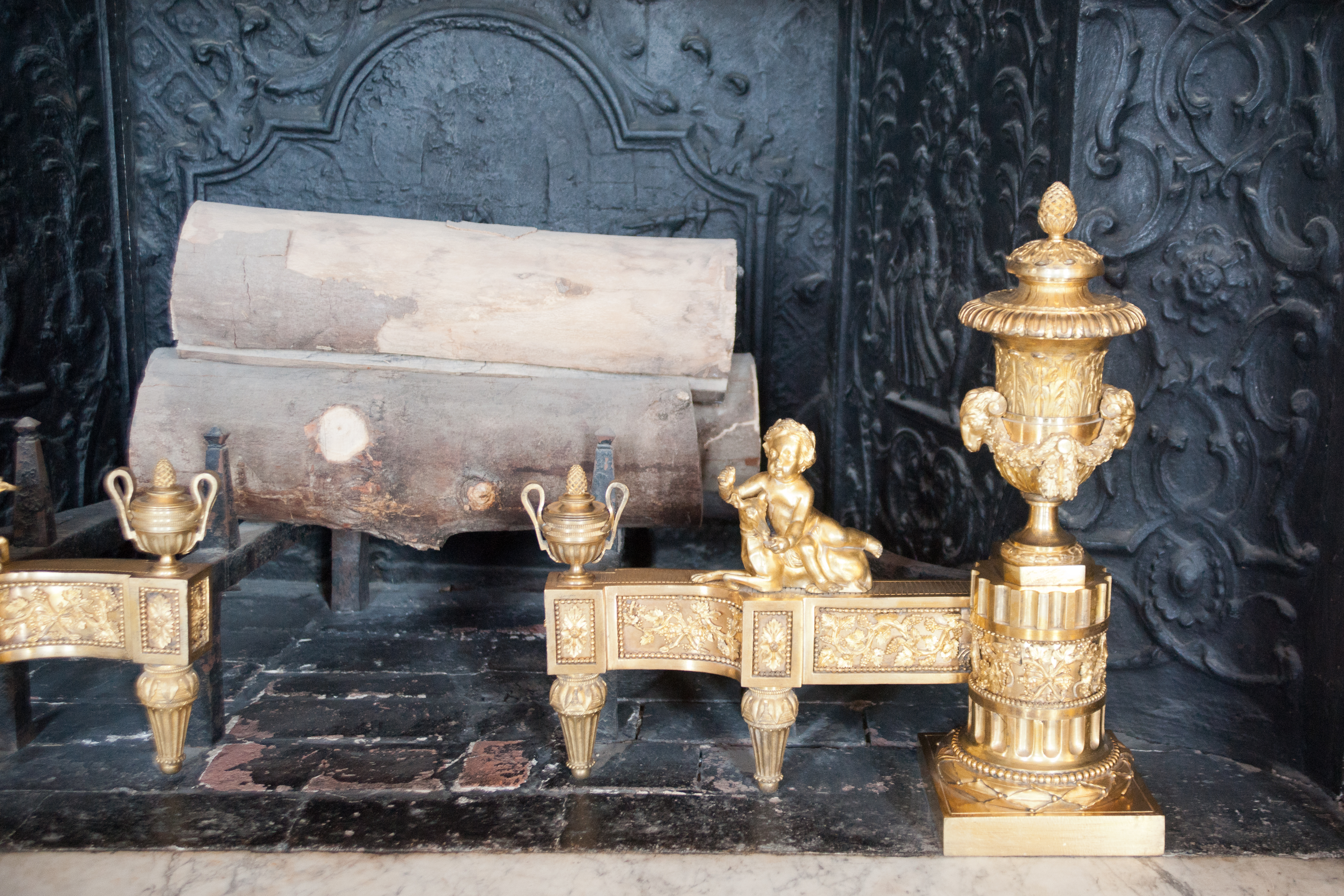
Andirons with wood, Petit Trianon

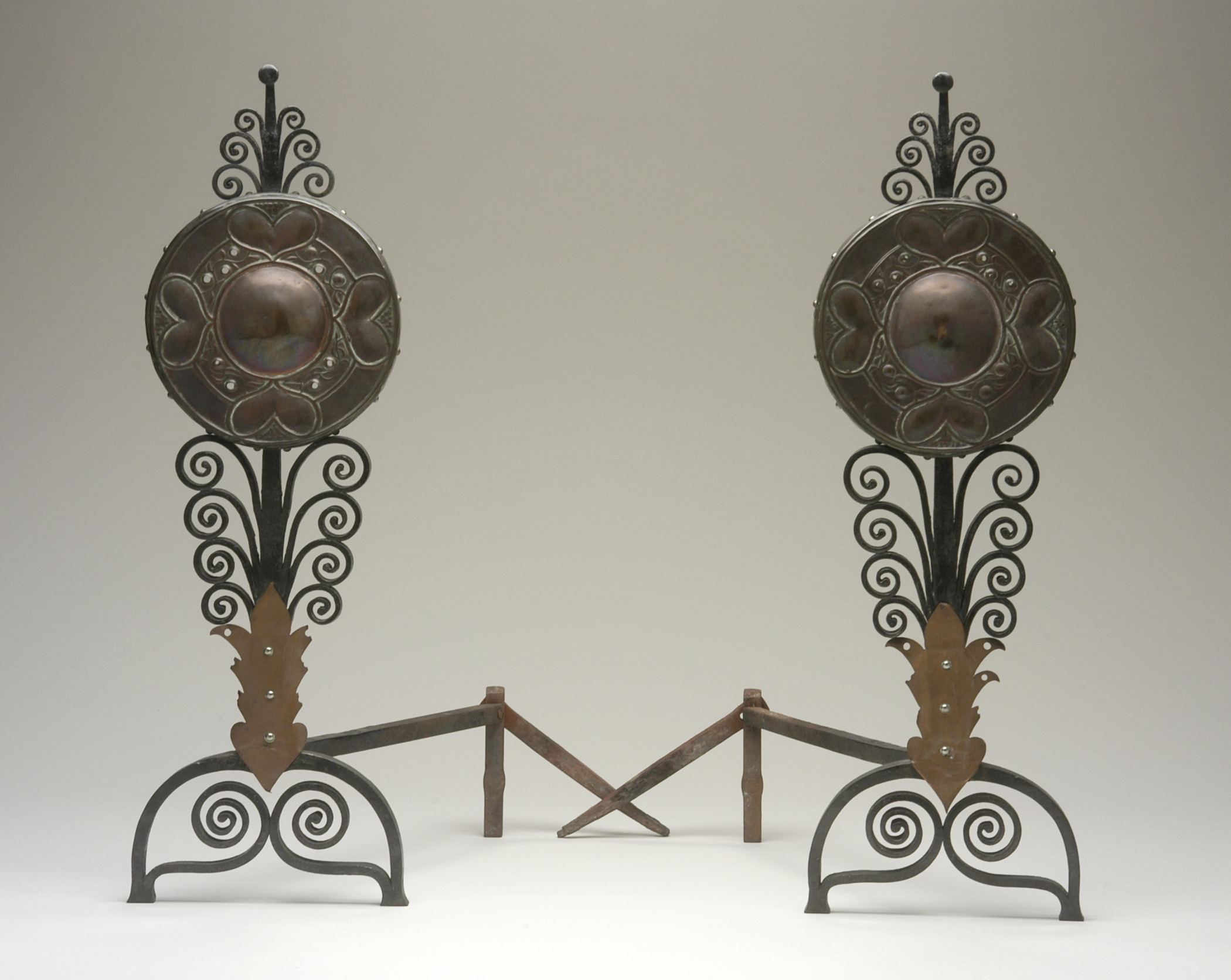
Tiffany & Co., c. 1895, iron, copper, and enamel

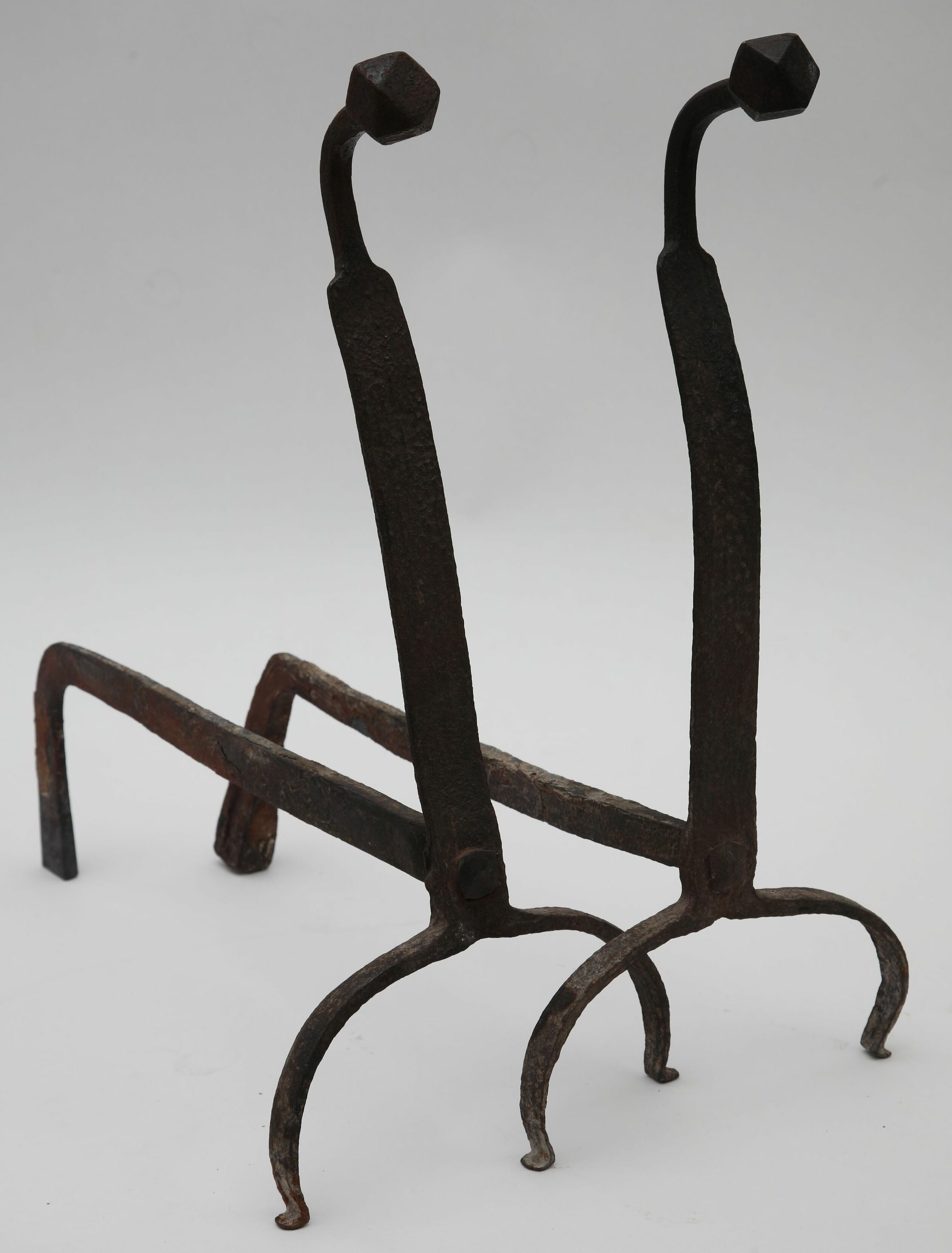
Hand forged andirons
