= Gourmet Museum and Library =

Museum in Belgium

Coordinates: 50.5572°N 5.3614°E

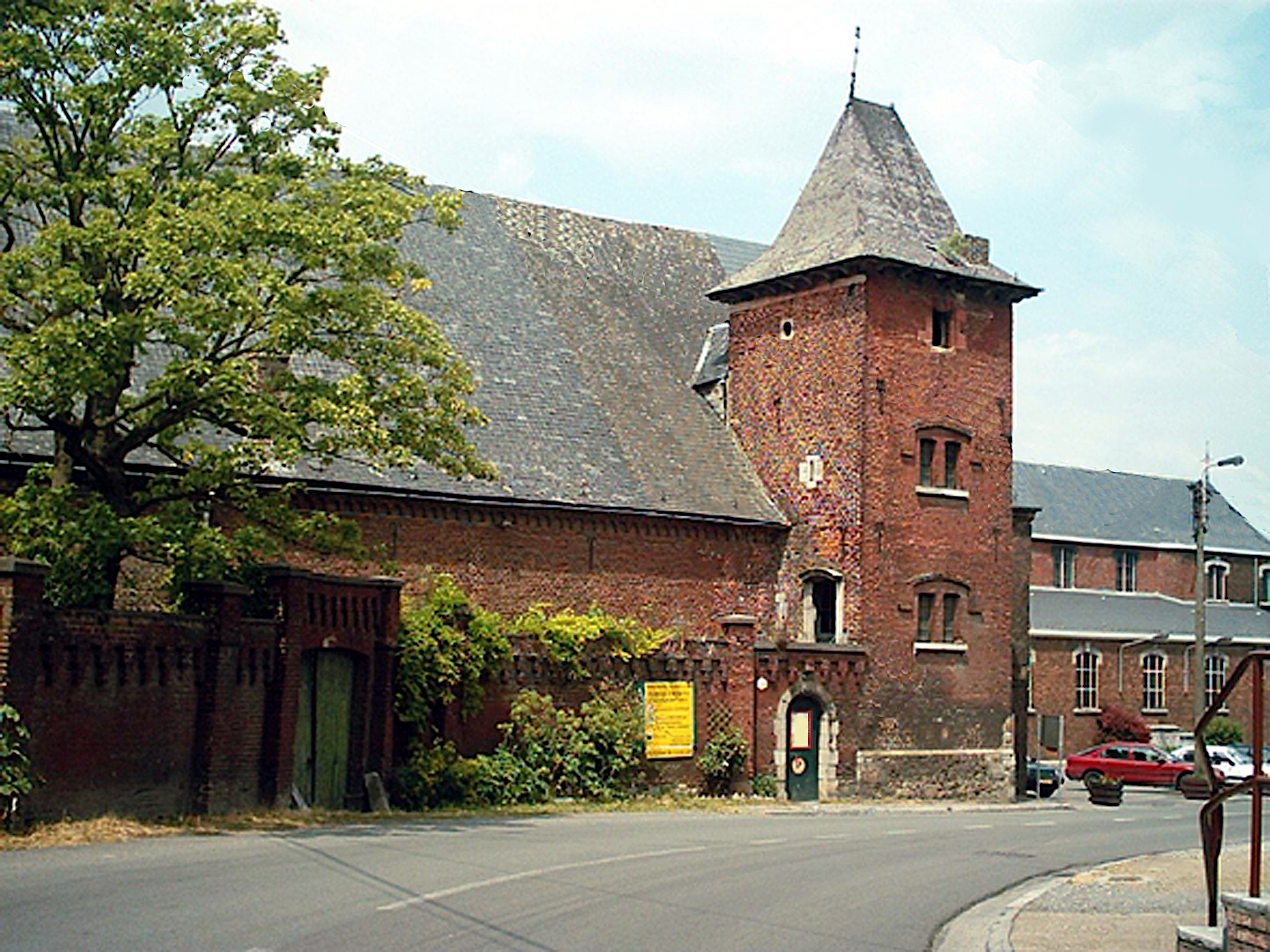
Entrance to the Ferme castrale

The Gourmet Museum and Library (French: Bibliothèque et musée de la Gourmandise) was a museum dedicated to the history of gastronomy, located in Hermalle-sous-Huy, province of Liège, Belgium.

It closed following the COVID-19 pandemic.

== Overview ==
=== Library ===
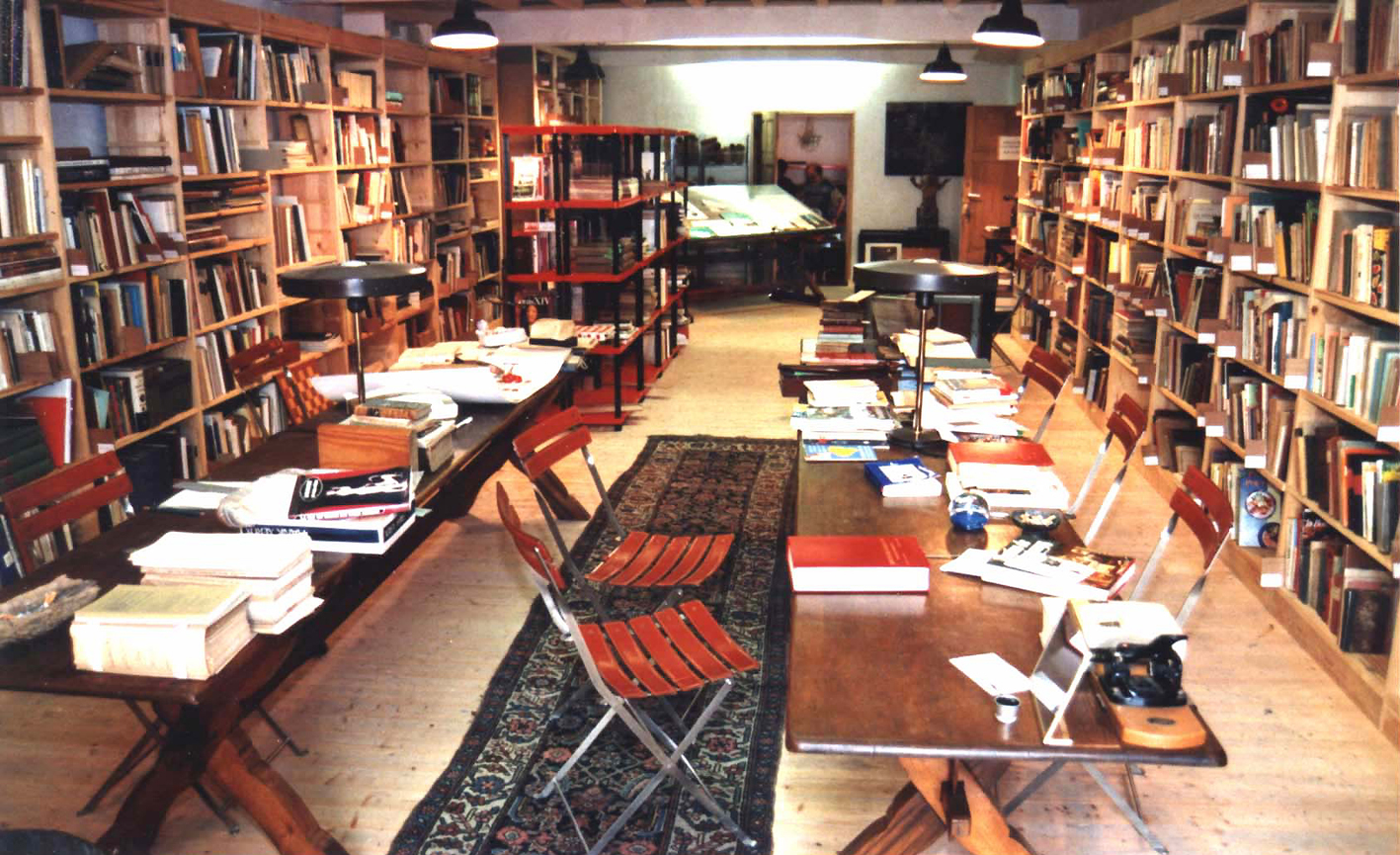
Reading room

It is the most important collection of food and drink books in Belgium and one of the twenty largest in Europe. The books, mainly old, are about food, arts of the table and tobacco, mainly in Europe and particularly in Belgium. They are classified by subjects: biographies, history, biographies, recipes, religious cookery, children’s cookery, dietetics, vegetarianism, veganism, home economics, sociology, food chemistry, publicities, iconography, literature, music, etc.

The data-processing encoding is modern. An outline of the catalogue is reproduced on the website. This library has the only specimen of the Cuisinier anglais.

The library also has other specialities:

- Art History and archaeology
- Dance and choreography
- Local and dialectal Archives
- History of the Post office and of the script (funds created in 2004 with the Museum “Postes restantes” located in the same building).

The works are consultable on written request and appointment, given the voluntary help of the librarians.

=== Museum ===
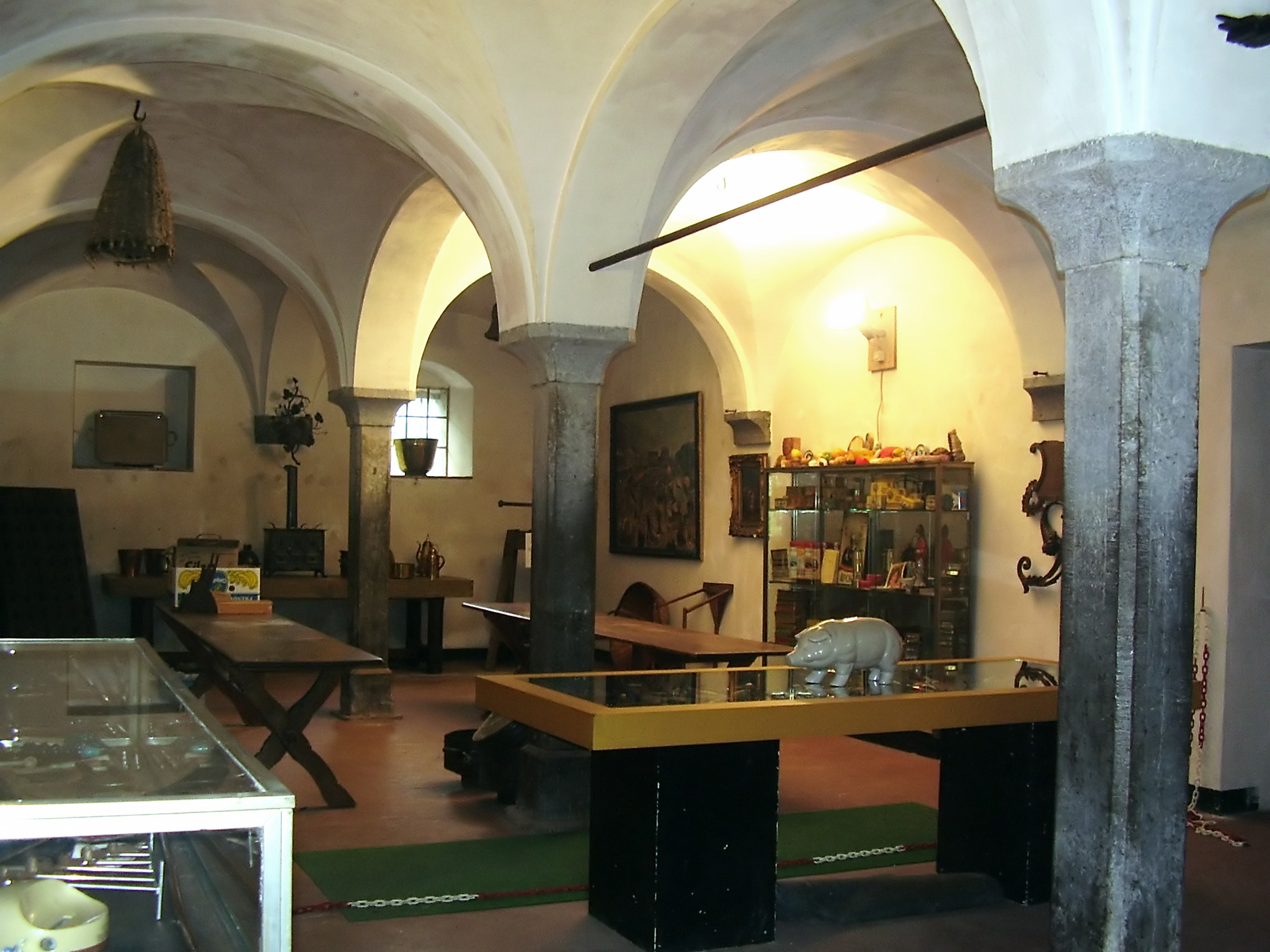
One of the rooms of the museum

Authentic objects of gastronomy, original paintings, furniture, masterpieces and objects of curiosity, etc. are laid out in vaulted rooms of the 17th century. The visits are always guided: the visitors are accompanied by a guide which explains, in an attractive and humorous way, the history of the cookery by taking its interlocutors into account. The children, the elderly, the disabled person find here an adapted reception. The association received the Belgium price CAP48 2009 for this policy

=== Exhibitions ===
Library and museum also organize in situ temporary exhibitions; they take part in cultural big events (like Made in Belgium in Brussels), and collaborate with other museums or institutions for research.

== Further activities ==
From 2002, the NPO founder organizes guided walks for the discovery of a particular gastronomic heritage: the edible wild plants. In addition, the tavern of the museums proposes dishes according to recipes from the library; it thus allows the public to taste an old and regional cooking.

== Sites of activity ==
Library and museum are installed in the “Ferme castrale of Hermalle-sous-Huy” (in the administrative entity of Engis), old farm of the contiguous castle. The buildings, which date from 17th and 18th centuries, can be the subject of a guided visit for groups. In addition to diary and tourist information in English, the website offers, in its French part, feature articles on particular subjects of gastronomy.

== See also ==
- List of food and beverage museums

== Sources ==
- Le Patrimoine monumental de la Belgique, Wallonie, T. 16/1, Mardaga, Liège, 1992, d/1991/0024/10
- Brochure des journées du Patrimoine en Wallonie, 1991, 1992, 1993, 1994, 1995, 1996, 1997, 1998, 1999, 2000, 2001, 2002, 2003, 2004, 2005, 2006, 2007
- Hermalle-sous-Huy Un village du val mosan, D/2004/8066/2 – ISBN 2-9600307-2-9
- Nos recettes anciennes et belges, D/2002/8066/1 – ISBN 2-9600307-0-2
- Guide des musées Wallonie-Bruxelles, D/2007/3606/1
- A... Musées vous !, ISSN 0033-1872, 02/2006
- Châteaux de la Meuse, Ed. FTPL - VVV Zuid-Limburg - Toerisme Limburg - FTPN, 2006
- Fiche du Patrimoine (Hermalle-sous-Huy, Ferme), Ed. DGATLP, Ministère de la Région wallonne
- Carnet du Patrimoine : Verstraeten J., Moreau Cl. et CX. Ménage, la Ferme castrale d'Hermalle-sous-Huy in Le Patrimoine rural du Pays d'Amay, Ed. Ministère de la Région wallonne, 1996
- Lemonnier A. & Marlaire Cl., Le Pont de Hermalle-sous-Huy - la Ferme castrale d'Hermalle-sous-Huy in Ponts d'hier et d'aujourd'hui - Le Pays hutois, Ed. MET, 1999
- Portugaels, Lily, La « Rawète » d'Internet, in La Libre Belgique-La Gazette de Liège, 2002, February 11
- Lemaire, Guy, Le musée de la gourmandise, Unique en Belgique, in Ambiance, 2003, May 21
- Duchateau, Catherine, Al Rawète devient La rawète, in Vers l'Avenir, 2003, May 16
- Lemaire, Guy, Keenan Vranckx – Cuisine pour Harry Potter - Taxidermie culinaire, in Spectacles, 2004, March 3
