= Algardi Firedogs =

Bronze sculptures by Alessandro Algardi

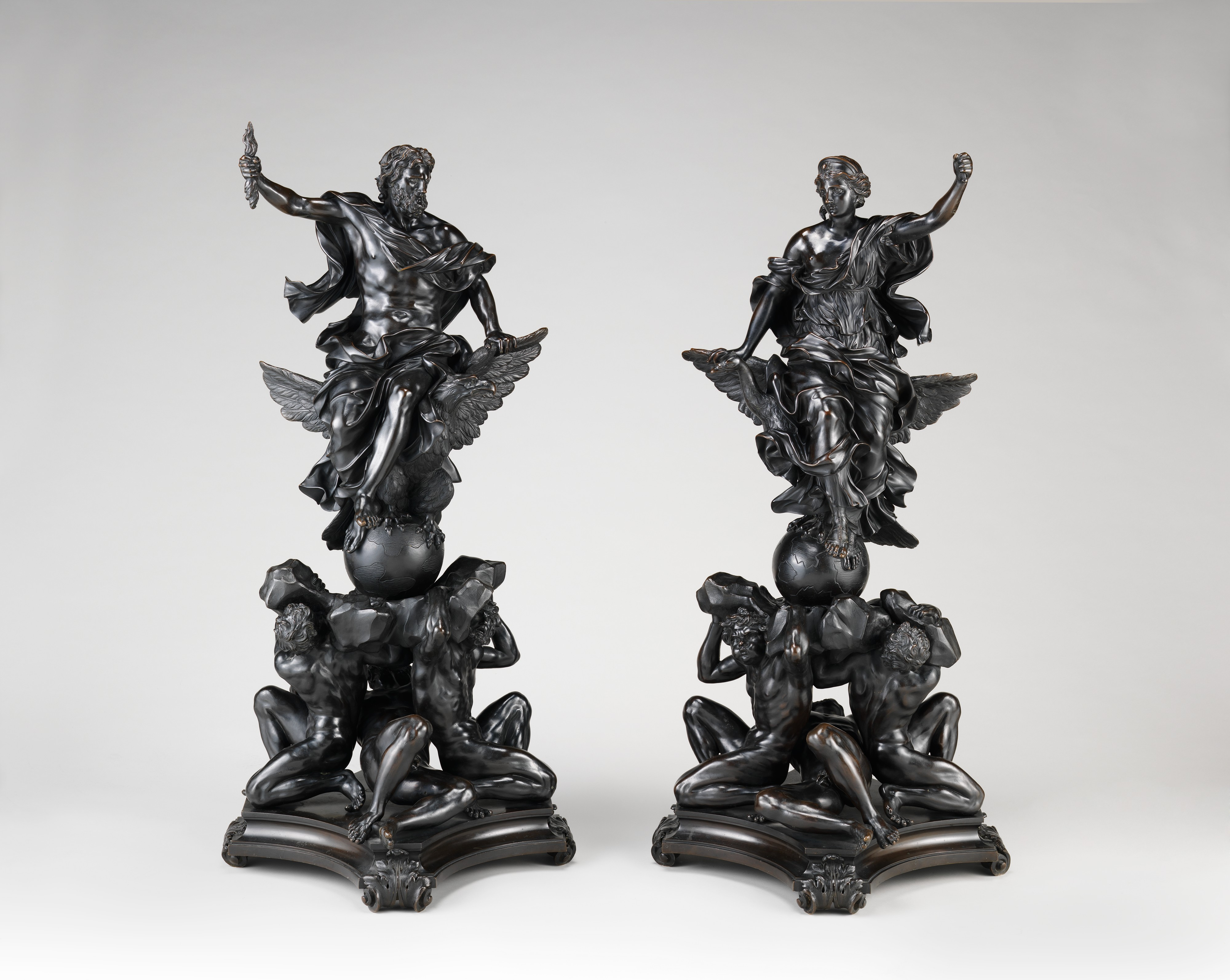
The pair, later copies, probably 18th-century, Metropolitan Museum of Art, New York. Height: 45 1/2 in. (115.6 cm)

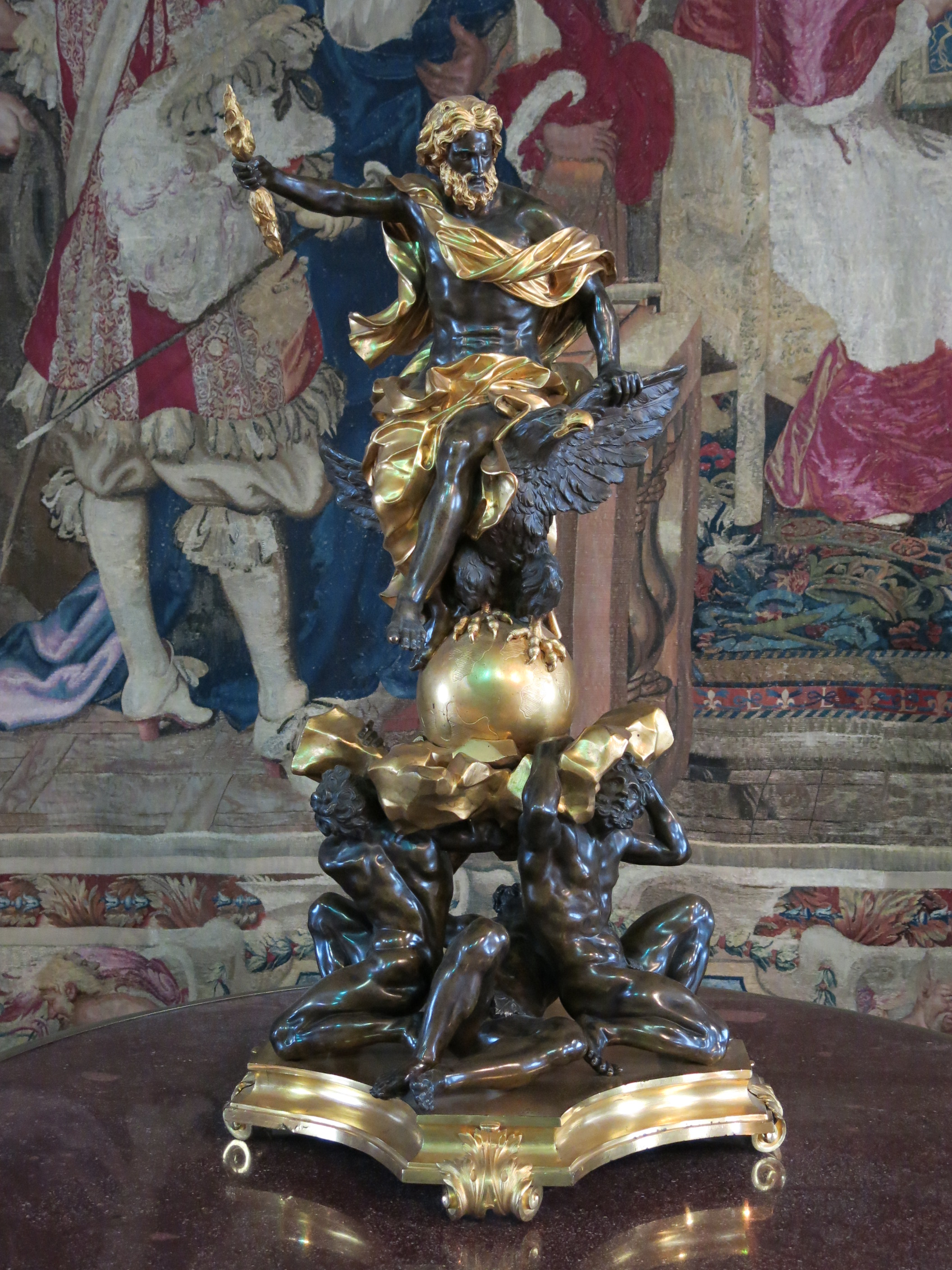
Jupiter, Louvre

The Algardi Firedogs (French: chenets de l'Algarde) are two small bronze sculptural groups, individually entitled Jupiter holding his thunderbolt, seated on a terrestrial globe supported by three Titans and Juno, Jupiter's wife carried by the winds.

== Originals ==
The originals were commissioned in 1650 as the fronts of andirons or firedogs from the Roman sculptor Alessandro Algardi for Philip IV of Spain by Diego Velázquez whilst he was Spanish ambassador to the Italian states. He ordered four bronzes symbolizing the four elements of the court of Spain. Algardi had only completed the first two before his death in 1654 and so the other two (Neptune carried by the waters and Cybele carried by the earth) were produced by his children. Philip did not use them as firedogs but as decorative elements for the garden of his Aranjuez Palace.

== France ==
Other 17th century foundries produced copies for other royal courts, especially the Juno and Jupiter. For example, a set of these two was delivered to the Palace of Versailles in 1684. Louis XIV placed them in niches in the oval salon, but Louis XV passed them to the marquis de Marigny, director of the Bâtiments du roi, who displayed them in the château de Ménars. After the marquis' death, they were moved to the Louvre in 1795, before being converted to support a pendulum clock at Napoleon's palace of château de Saint-Cloud. The two groups were then moved to the palais des Tuileries, where in 1845 they were part-gilded by Charles Christofle. The Juno is now lost, but the Jupiter is now on display in the Louvre.

Two similar Juno and Jupiter groups were also owned by Louis, Grand Dauphin, initially displaying them in the château de Choisy then from 1695 in the château de Meudon.

== Selected examples ==
- Wallace Collection, London - pair, one of the Grand Dauphin's sets
- Metropolitan Museum of Art, New York - one, plus a pair of later copies, probably 18th-century.
- Michele and Donald D'Amour Museum of Fine Art, Springfield, Massachusetts - one work
- Pavlovsk Palace, St Petersburg - one work
