= Ferme castrale of Hermalle-sous-Huy =

Coordinates: 50.55742°N 5.36134°E

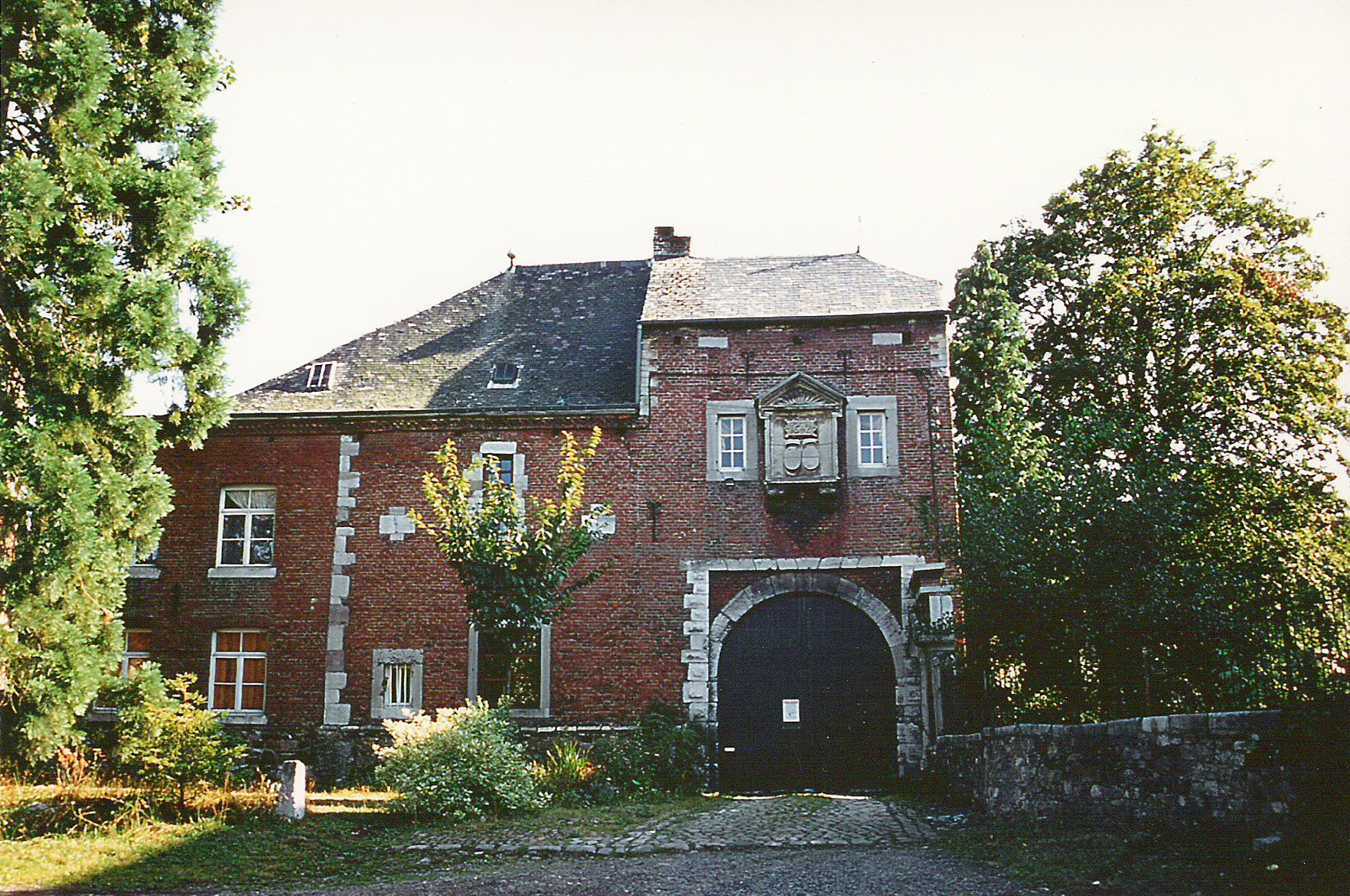
North façade of the Ferme castrale.

The "ferme castrale" of Hermalle-sous-Huy, located near the Meuse between Huy and Liège in Belgium, is the old farm of the castle of Hermalle and dates from 1642. Since the 1990s it has become a center of culture and tourism based on food and drink history.

== Origin and evolution of the building ==
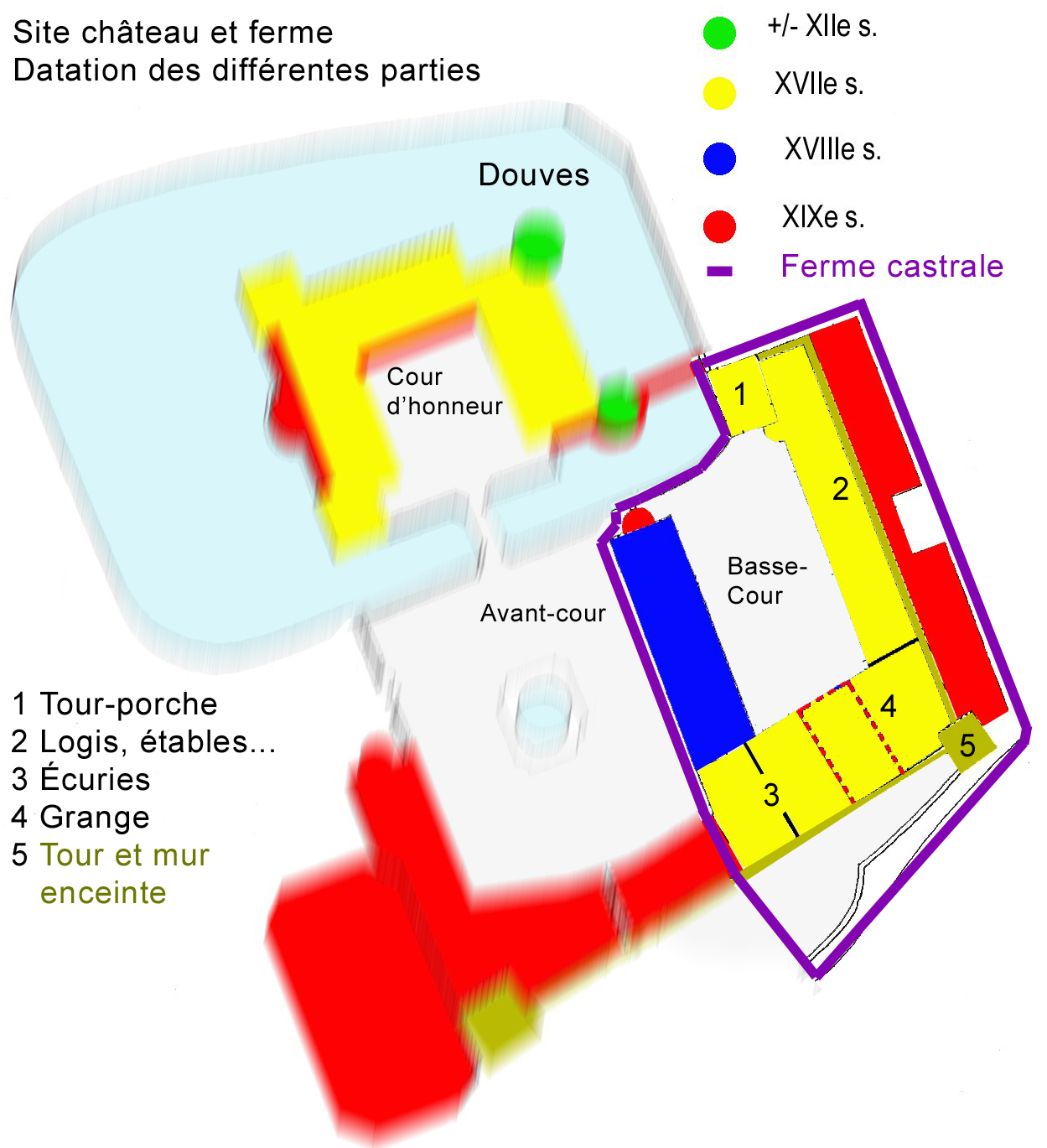
Plan of the farm.

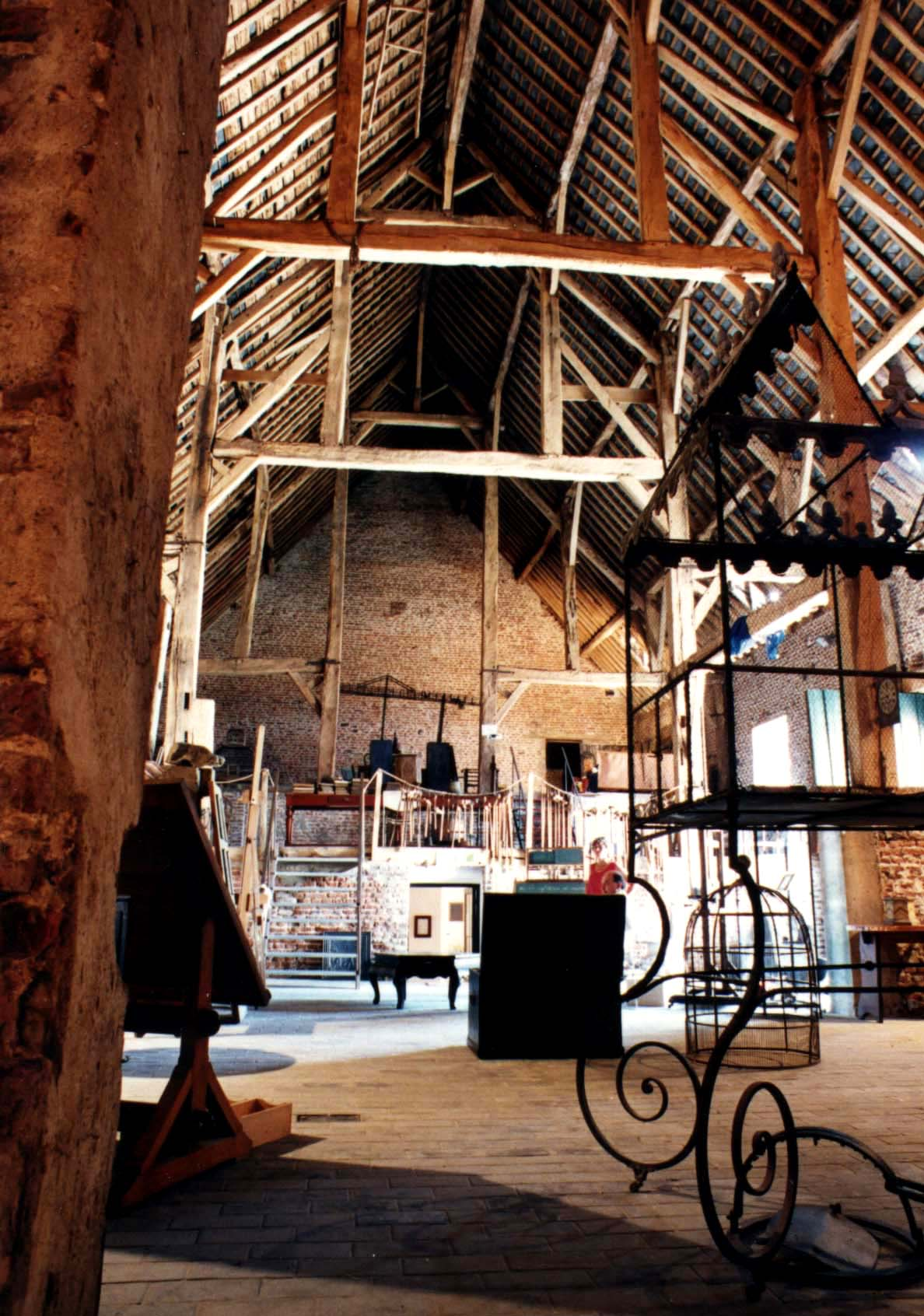
The barn.

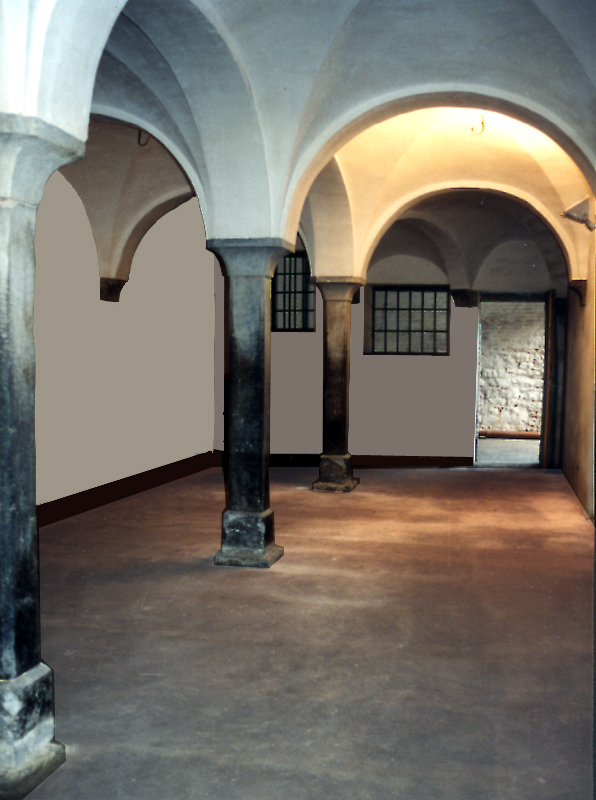
One of the stables of the 17th century.

In the seventeenth century, the count of Holy Roman Empire Conrad d'Ursel, owner of the Castle of Hermalle, renovated and expanded his property.

He gave it a gatehouse entrance with an arched portal, surmounted by a tufa loggia dated 1642, that can be accessed by crossing a bridge with three arches overlooking the moat, then crossing a drawbridge. The entrance leads to a vast space enclosed by a wall marked with corner towers at three levels.

Within this space, on the east side, the count build a main building containing dwellings for the farmer and his staff, and stables, pigsties, etc. topped with haylofts. Also in the enclosure, at the southeast corner, a curved portal opens into a large barn "in deep". In its southern extension, two stables are built with arches of intersecting arches falling on square monolithic pillars.

In the eighteenth century an additional wing was built that separates the yard from the front courtyard of the castle. The building thus became a "square farm", a traditional structure of farms in Condroz and Hesbaye.

In the early nineteenth century, the farm, despite its large size, proved too small and required extension. More space was created in the barn by the building of another floor. In addition, the east wing was doubled in width, beyond the wall, along its entire length - except at the location of a small graveyard. The farm was permanently isolated from the forecourt of the castle by a wall and a half turret built at the end of the west wing.

== Architectural features ==
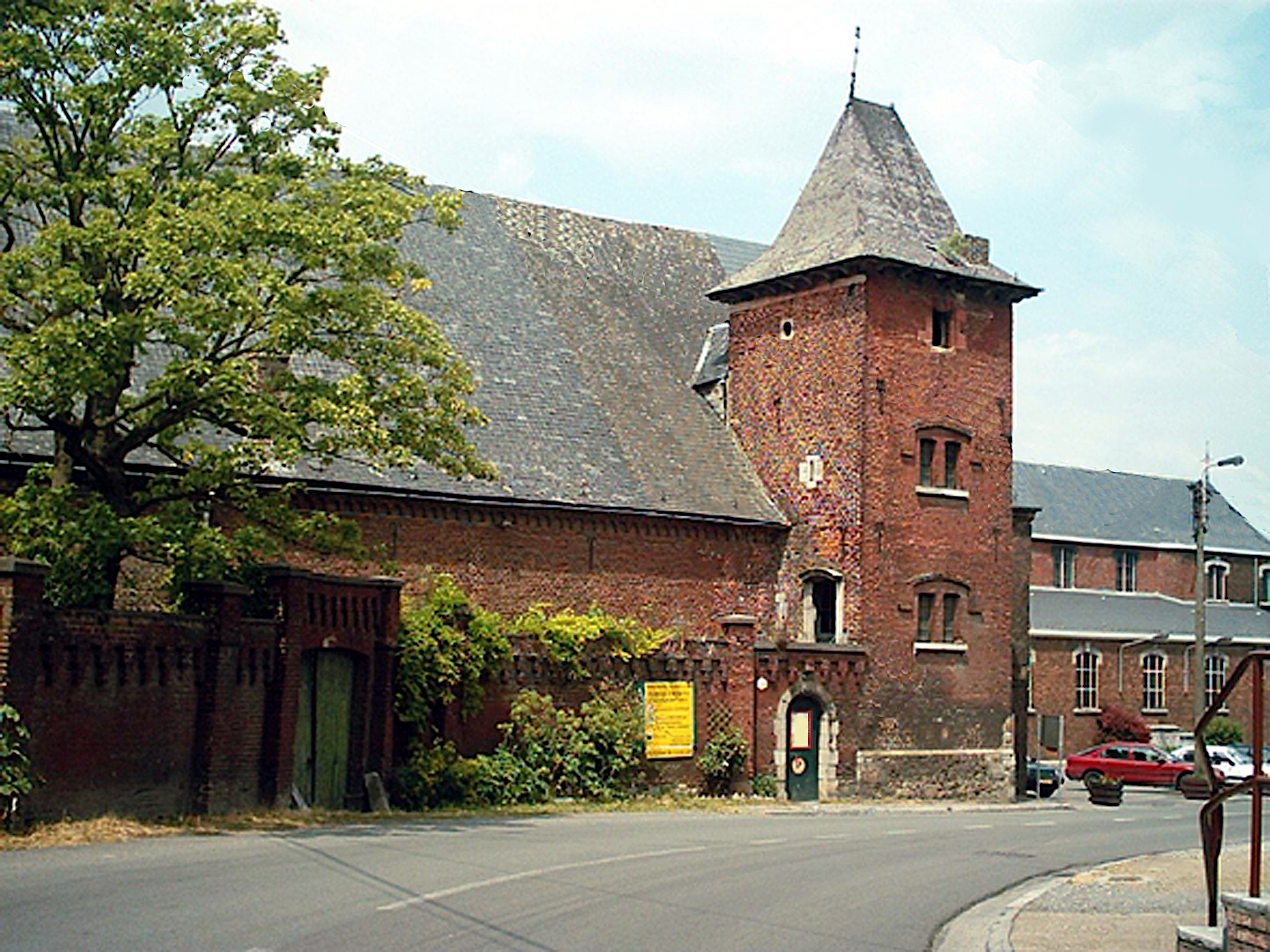
South façade of the Ferme castrale.

The exterior walls are brick on a sandstone and limestone dado.

The stone frames of openings differ depending on the period of construction; some door lintels were also changed in the nineteenth century for the sake of aesthetics.

The slate hip roof with gable is planted on slopes overlooking the courtyard, with dormer windows.

The facades visible from the street are all different:

- North (street Gerée), the facade has elements of the seventeenth century - including the rebate of the deck of the drawbridge, the portal amounts to harp and loggia - from the eighteenth century and nineteenth century for the openings.
- In the east alley near the church Saint-Martin, it notes, following the expansion of the building, industrial architecture.
- South (road Freddy Terwagne), it is partially hidden by a high perimeter wall in the nineteenth century opened by a door dated 1641 and carved with the arms of Count d'Ursel - where the public enters.

The exterior of the eighteenth century West wing, overlooking the front courtyard of the castle (private) is not available and was hidden in the nineteenth century by the building of a wall with trompe-l'œil.

== New use ==
In the last quarter of the twentieth century, following the cessation of farming, the farm was neglected and sold by its owners at the time, the Potesta family who have gradually dismembered the field lord.

Purchased in late 1990 by a cooperative of individuals, a renovation was begun that is not yet complete.

In September 1991, the barn - with one of the most beautiful structures of the province - was opened for the first time to the public for the European Heritage Days. The place and the exhibition shown, "Old culinary heritage in private collections", received an appreciative audience that influenced the future of the building. A nonprofit organization was created two years later and developed over the years, helping with architectural restoration, and establishing a culture and tourism project based on food and drink history.

In the farm are the Gourmet Museum and Library, the Museum "Postes restantes" (history of the Poste and the script), the local Tourist information office, a tavern with old (since 5th century) and terroir cuisine and a bookstore. The old main building is a private home; the old place for manure is become a small garden.

== Natural Heritage ==
Two trees are listed by the Walloon Region on the site:

- A Sequoiadendron giganteum in the old filled moat which extends along the wall of the old cemetery.
- An Acer pseudoplatanus, known as "Tree of the Hanged-drowned man", at the edge of the moat, between the farm and the castle.

== Classification as a historical monument ==
The classification of the building by the Walloon Region in 2006 was denied; a new application was made in early summer 2008, and a petition of support was opened on July 31, 2008. The petition has gathered 1118 signatures, from the Walloon Region, but also from the Brussels-Capital Region, the Flemish Region, France, Germany, Canada, Netherlands, and the USA. The press reported the information.

On October 7, 2008, the municipal council Engis voted unanimously for classification to the Walloon Region and the application for registration of the building on the backup list.

The farm was added to the conservation list of the Walloon Region on 27 April 2009.
