= List of protected heritage sites in Engis =

This table shows an overview of the protected heritage sites in the Walloon town Engis. This list is part of Belgium's national heritage.

Object	Year/architect	Town/section	Address	Coordinates	Number^{?}	Image
Rectory ^{(nl)} ^{(fr)}		Engis	rue Gérée, n°8	50.557907°N 5.361929°E	61080-CLT-0003-01 Info	Pastorie
House "Héna" and ensemble of buildings nearby ^{(nl)} ^{(fr)}		Engis	rue Lecrenier n°55	50.557401°N 5.370565°E	61080-CLT-0007-01 Info	Gebouw aan rue Lecrenier n°55, genaamd "Héna", en gebouwenensemble in de omgeving
18th century house ^{(nl)} ^{(fr)}		Engis	rue J. Wauters, n°16	50.580977°N 5.402995°E	61080-CLT-0008-01 Info	Achttiende eeuw huis (gevels, daken, interieurelementen van de achttiende eeuw: het stucwerk in de woonkamer op de begane grond trap, deuren, chassis, bosje achter zandstenen open haard op de begane grond), bijgebouw als linker uitbreiding (gevels en daken), de bouw van de zeventiende eeuw loodrecht op het schema en met uitzicht op de tuin (voor- en achtergevel) en het ensemble van het huis en de tuin.
Grottos Lyell & Rosée ^{(nl)} ^{(fr)}		Engis		50.576435°N 5.406749°E	61080-PEX-0001-01 Info	

== See also ==
- List of protected heritage sites in Liège (province)
- Engis
