= Johann Hermann Janssens =

Johann Hermann Janssens (b. at Maaseik, present-day Netherlands, 7 December 1783; d. at Engis, 23 May 1853) was a Belgian Roman Catholic theologian.

== Life ==
After completing his theological studies in Rome he was appointed professor in the College of Fribourg, Switzerland, in 1809. From 1816 he was professor of Scripture and dogmatic theology in the ecclesiastical seminary of Liège.

His teaching in this institution was taxed with heterodoxy, and in 1823 he was removed and made pastor of Engis. Shortly afterward, and against the will of his ecclesiastical superiors, he accepted the chair of anthropology and metaphysics in the philosophical college of the Catholic University of Leuven. He retained this position until the Revolution of 1830, when the college was suppressed.

== Works ==
His international reputation rested mainly on his first publication, "Hermeneutica Sacra seu Introductio in omnes et singulos libros sacros Veteris et Novi Foederis." Published in 1818, it was written during his time at Fribourg. A French translation of this work, the original of which had reached its nineteenth edition in 1897, was published by Pacaud as early as 1828. A fifth edition of this translation, edited by Glaire and Sionnet, was published in Paris in 1855.

In retirement at Engis, he composed a history of the Netherlands (3 vols., Liège, 1840), written from a Protestant standpoint.
