= Engis =

Municipality in Liège Province, Wallonia, Belgium

Engis Indji (Walloon)
- Municipality
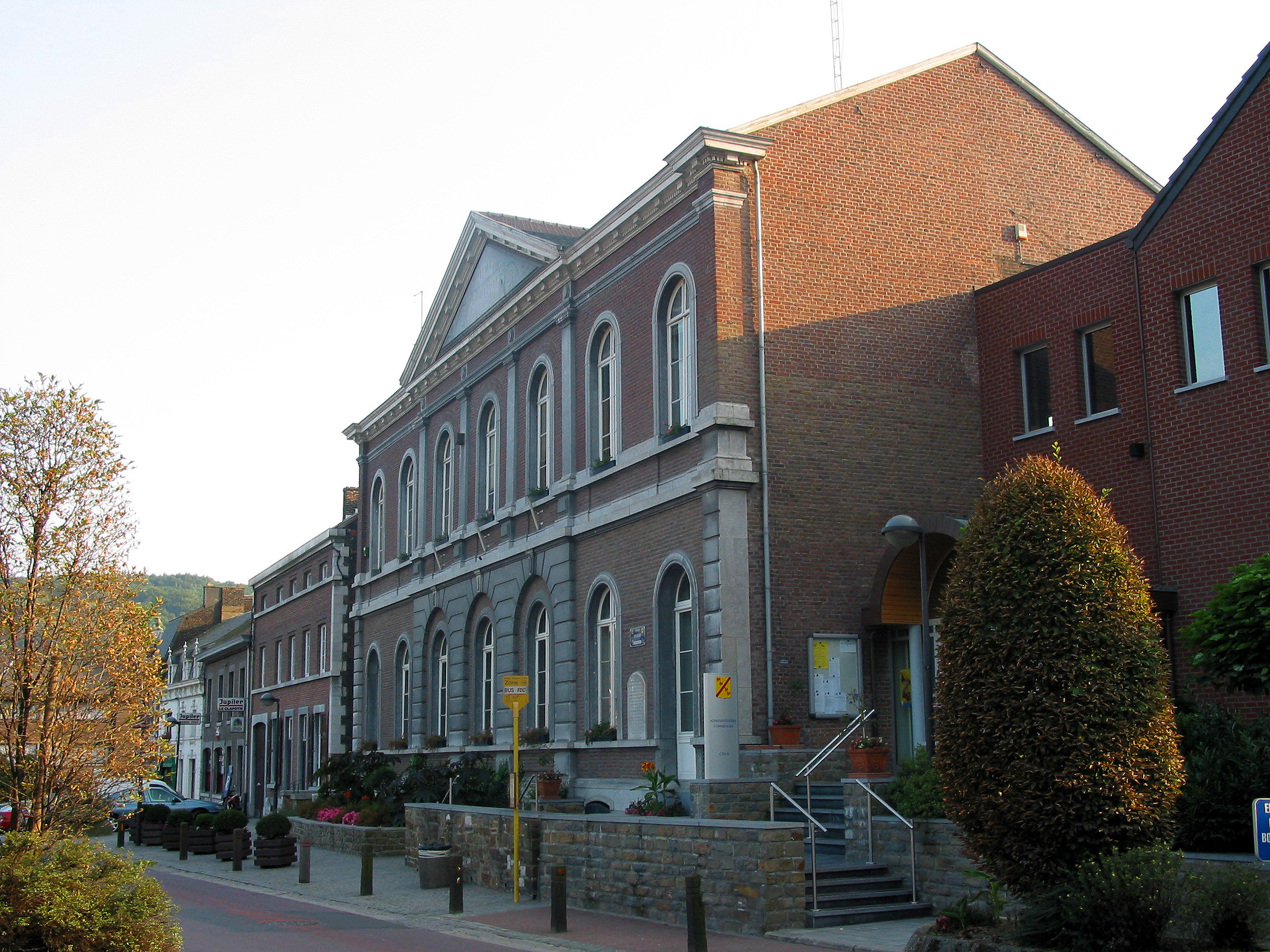

- Coat of arms

- Location of Engis in the province of Liège
- Interactive map of Engis
- Location in Belgium
- Coordinates: 50°35′N 05°25′E
- Country: Belgium
- Community: French Community
- Region: Wallonia
- Province: Liège
- Arrondissement: Huy

Government
  - Mayor: Serge Manzato (PS)
  - Governing party: PS

Area
  - Total: 27.74 km^{2} (10.71 sq mi)

Population (2018-01-01)
  - Total: 6,122
  - Density: 220.7/km^{2} (571.6/sq mi)
- Postal codes: 4480
- NIS code: 61080
- Area codes: 04, 085
- Website: www.engis.be

"Engis" is also an obsolete scientific name for the pleasing fungus beetle genus Dacne.

Engis (French pronunciation: [ɑ̃ʒi]; Walloon: Indji) is a municipality of Wallonia located in the province of Liège, Belgium.

On 1 January 2006 Engis had a total population of 5,686. The total area is 27.74 km^{2} which gives a population density of 205 inhabitants per km^{2}.

As of 2022, the population is estimated at approximately 6,269.

The municipality consists of the following districts: Clermont-sous-Huy, Engis and Hermalle-sous-Huy.

In 1829, in this village, Philippe-Charles Schmerling discovered the first Neanderthal ever, Engis 2, the damaged skull of a young child. This was before the 1856 discovery of the Neanderthal type specimen in the Neander Valley. Its importance was not recognised until 1936.

== Pollution fatalities ==
In late 1930 and early 1931, several thousand cases of acute pulmonary attacks occurred in the Meuse valley, centered on Engis, and 60 people died. A commission of inquiry set up by the Belgian government concluded that the cause was poisonous waste gases, primarily sulfur dioxide, emitted by the many factories in the valley and the furnaces used by the population, in conjunction with unusual climatic conditions coupled with the unique topographic characteristics of the area. Others have claimed that the deaths were the result acute fluorine intoxication.

== Notable residents ==
- Johann Hermann Janssens (1783–1853), theologian, died in Engis

== See also ==
- List of protected heritage sites in Engis
