= Hermalle-sous-Huy =

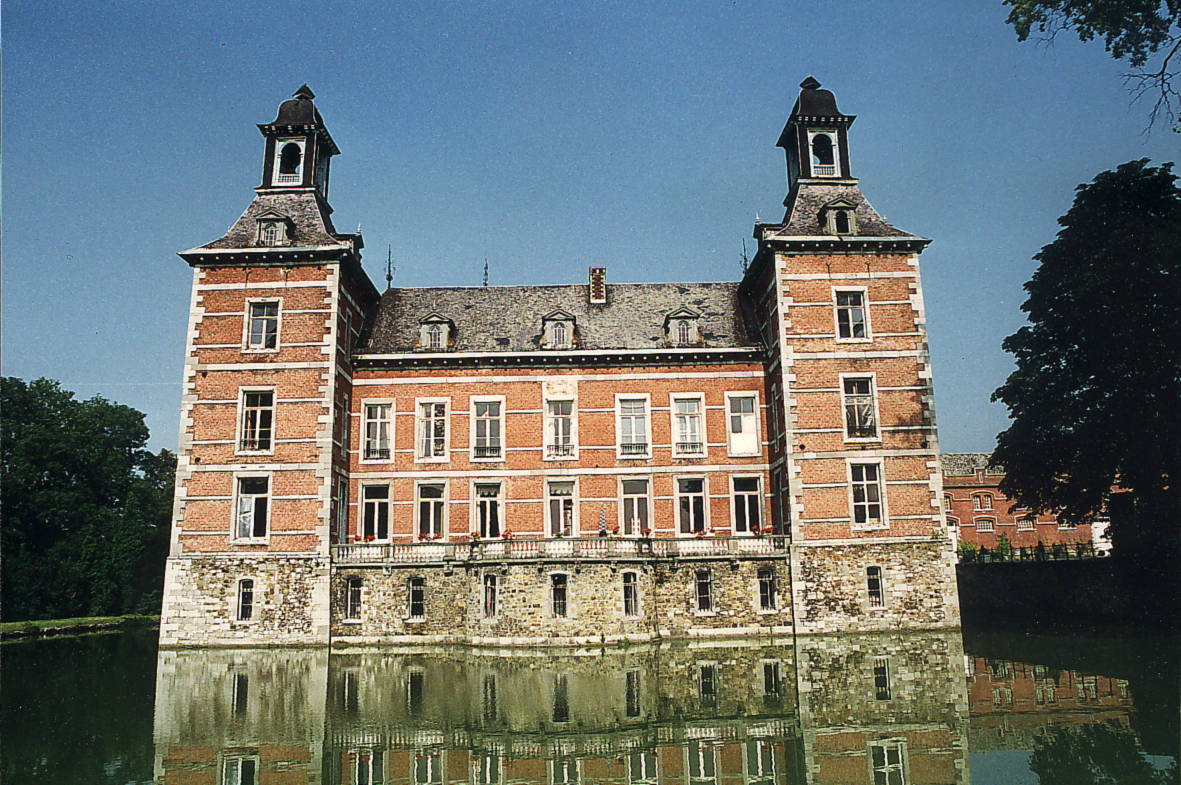
- Château de Hermalle-sous-Huy in Hermalle-sous-Huy

- Location within Belgium Location within Europe
- Coordinates: 50°33′29″N 05°21′49″E
- Country: Belgium
- Region: Wallonia
- Province: Liège
- Municipality: Engis

Hermalle-sous-Huy (French pronunciation: [ɛʁmal su ɥi, - wi], lit. 'Hermalle under Huy') is a district of the municipality of Engis, located in the province of Liège in Wallonia, Belgium.

During the Middle Ages, Hermalle-sous-Huy was the site of a court of law. The Château de Hermalle-sous-Huy is located in Hermalle-sous-Huy. The centre of the settlement also contains several other historical buildings, including the birthplace of master mason Jean-Gille Jacob, which contains some murals depicting the work of masons, unique in Europe.
