= List of protected heritage sites in Borgloon =

The list of immovable heritage sites in Borgloon with an overview of the immovable heritage sites in the Flemish town Borgloon contains over 600 objects.

These lists are part of Belgium's national heritage:

- List of protected heritage sites in Borgloon (part 1) (numbers 31732-31981)
- List of protected heritage sites in Borgloon (part 2) (numbers 31982-32024, and others up to number 201028)

== See also ==
- List of onroerend erfgoed in Limburg (Belgium)
- Borgloon
