= List of protected heritage sites in Borgloon (part 1) =

This table shows an overview of the protected heritage sites in the Flemish town Borgloon. This list is part of Belgium's national heritage.

Object	Status^{?}	Year/architect	Town/section	Address	Coordinates	Number^{?}	Image
St. Alphonsus Parish ^{(nl)} ^{(fr)}	Yes		Borgloon	Alfonsstraat	50.78546°N 5.38060°E	31732 Info	More images
Castle Bommer Courts ^{(nl)} ^{(fr)}	Yes		Borgloon	Alfonsstraat 59	50.78577°N 5.38077°E	31733 Info	
single house ^{(nl)} ^{(fr)}	Yes		Borgloon	Alfonsstraat 60	50.78531°N 5.38101°E	31734 Info	
Rectory ^{(nl)} ^{(fr)}	Yes		Borgloon	Alfonsstraat 61	50.78498°N 5.38032°E	31735 Info	
Red Farm ^{(nl)} ^{(fr)}	Yes		Borgloon	Alfonsstraat 62	50.78426°N 5.38017°E	31736 Info	
Closed farm Biezenhof ^{(nl)} ^{(fr)}			Borgloon	Alfonsstraat 63	50.78441°N 5.37846°E	31737 Info	
Single double house ^{(nl)} ^{(fr)}			Borgloon	Alfonsstraat 64	50.78365°N 5.37861°E	31738 Info	
Farmer Burger House ^{(nl)} ^{(fr)}			Borgloon	Bommershovenstraat 8	50.78809°N 5.38806°E	31739 Info	
Farmer neoclassical mansion ^{(nl)} ^{(fr)}			Borgloon	Bommershovenstraat 13	50.78696°N 5.38791°E	31740 Info	
The True Friends Cafe ^{(nl)} ^{(fr)}			Borgloon	Bommershovenstraat 23	50.78661°N 5.38565°E	31741 Info	
Closed farm ^{(nl)} ^{(fr)}			Borgloon	Loonderweg 13	50.78744°N 5.37769°E	31742 Info	
Wrought iron cross ^{(nl)} ^{(fr)}	Yes		Borgloon	Moerenstraat	50.78654°N 5.38159°E	31743 Info	
Monument to fallen World War I ^{(nl)} ^{(fr)}			Borgloon	Moerenstraat	50.78621°N 5.38546°E	31744 Info	
forest ranger's house ^{(nl)} ^{(fr)}	Yes		Borgloon	Oude Kassei 46	50.78583°N 5.38531°E	31745 Info	
Small chapel ^{(nl)} ^{(fr)}	Yes		Borgloon	Moerenstraat	50.78598°N 5.38573°E	31746 Info	
Detached house ^{(nl)} ^{(fr)}			Borgloon	Oude Kassei 36	50.78569°N 5.38829°E	31747 Info	
Farmer house with service buildings ^{(nl)} ^{(fr)}			Borgloon	Tongersesteenweg 363	50.78811°N 5.39463°E	31749 Info	
Closed farm ^{(nl)} ^{(fr)}			Borgloon	Tongersesteenweg 378	50.78657°N 5.39793°E	31750 Info	
Neo-Gothic cemetery chapel ^{(nl)} ^{(fr)}			Borgloon	Harenstraat	50.78990°N 5.39139°E	31751 Info	
Neo-Gothic burial chapel ^{(nl)} ^{(fr)}			Borgloon	Harenstraat	50.78986°N 5.39148°E	31752 Info	
Renovated house ^{(nl)} ^{(fr)}	Yes		Borgloon	Harenstraat 32	50.79041°N 5.39557°E	31753 Info	
St. Peter's Parish ^{(nl)} ^{(fr)}	Yes		Borgloon	Singelstraat	50.79354°N 5.40048°E	31754 Info	More images
Castle Terhove ^{(nl)} ^{(fr)}	Yes		Borgloon	Terhove 140	50.77648°N 5.40006°E	31755 Info	
Castle Terhove ^{(nl)} ^{(fr)}	Yes		Borgloon	Terhove 141	50.77648°N 5.40006°E	31755 Info	
Mansion ^{(nl)} ^{(fr)}	Yes		Borgloon	Abeelplein 2	50.80264°N 5.34260°E	31756 Info	
house ^{(nl)} ^{(fr)}	Yes		Borgloon	Abeelplein 3	50.80264°N 5.34248°E	31757 Info	
Hôtel des Bains ^{(nl)} ^{(fr)}	Yes		Borgloon	Abeelplein 4	50.80254°N 5.34231°E	31758 Info	
house ^{(nl)} ^{(fr)}	Yes		Borgloon	Abeelplein 13	50.80289°N 5.34284°E	31759 Info	
Town house ^{(nl)} ^{(fr)}	Yes		Borgloon	Abeelplein 14	50.80303°N 5.34298°E	31760 Info	
house ^{(nl)} ^{(fr)}	Yes		Borgloon	Abeelplein 15	50.80287°N 5.34311°E	31761 Info	
Semi-closed farm ^{(nl)} ^{(fr)}			Borgloon	Boeshoven 1	50.80541°N 5.36301°E	31762 Info	
Building Service ^{(nl)} ^{(fr)}			Borgloon	Boeshoven	50.80521°N 5.36344°E	31763 Info	
L-shaped service building ^{(nl)} ^{(fr)}			Borgloon	Boeshoven 6	50.80373°N 5.36468°E	31765 Info	
Hospital chapel and convent ^{(nl)} ^{(fr)}	Yes		Borgloon	Graethempoort	50.80318°N 5.34007°E	31766 Info	More images
Farmer neoclassical mansion ^{(nl)} ^{(fr)}			Borgloon	Graethempoort 5	50.80300°N 5.33768°E	31767 Info	
Single mansion ^{(nl)} ^{(fr)}			Borgloon	Graethempoort 21	50.80347°N 5.33589°E	31768 Info	
house ^{(nl)} ^{(fr)}			Borgloon	Graethempoort 33	50.80379°N 5.33290°E	31769 Info	
Village house ^{(nl)} ^{(fr)}			Borgloon	Graethempoort 50	50.80387°N 5.33587°E	31770 Info	
Detached farm house civilian ^{(nl)} ^{(fr)}			Borgloon	Graethempoort 52	50.80373°N 5.33559°E	31771 Info	
neo-classical mansion ^{(nl)} ^{(fr)}	Yes		Borgloon	Graethemstraat 1	50.80271°N 5.34203°E	31772 Info	
Eclectic mansion ^{(nl)} ^{(fr)}			Borgloon	Graethemstraat 11	50.80292°N 5.34151°E	31773 Info	
Cross Barn from 1833 ^{(nl)} ^{(fr)}			Borgloon	Kanunnik Darisstraat 1	50.80280°N 5.34787°E	31774 Info	
house ^{(nl)} ^{(fr)}	Yes		Borgloon	Klappoel 1	50.80247°N 5.34276°E	31775 Info	
Chapel of Our Lord of the cold stone and Our Lady of Seven Sorrows ^{(nl)} ^{(fr)}	Yes		Borgloon	Kortestraat	50.80078°N 5.34358°E	31776 Info	
L-shaped farm town ^{(nl)} ^{(fr)}			Borgloon	Kortestraat 2	50.80197°N 5.34316°E	31777 Info	
Village house ^{(nl)} ^{(fr)}	Yes		Borgloon	Kortestraat 7	50.80190°N 5.34351°E	31778 Info	
City Farm ^{(nl)} ^{(fr)}	Yes		Borgloon	Kortestraat 9	50.80181°N 5.34359°E	31779 Info	
Canon House ^{(nl)} ^{(fr)}	Yes		Borgloon	Kortestraat 10	50.80154°N 5.34328°E	31780 Info	
house ^{(nl)} ^{(fr)}	Yes		Borgloon	Kroonstraat 1	50.80285°N 5.34400°E	31782 Info	
house ^{(nl)} ^{(fr)}	Yes		Borgloon	Kroonstraat 7	50.80282°N 5.34452°E	31784 Info	
house ^{(nl)} ^{(fr)}	Yes		Borgloon	Kroonstraat 13		31784 Info	
house ^{(nl)} ^{(fr)}			Borgloon	Kroonstraat 14	50.80242°N 5.34485°E	31785 Info	
neo-classical mansion ^{(nl)} ^{(fr)}	Yes		Borgloon	Kroonstraat 16	50.80244°N 5.34505°E	31786 Info	
Classical townhouse ^{(nl)} ^{(fr)}	Yes		Borgloon	Kroonstraat 17	50.80268°N 5.34509°E	31787 Info	
Classical townhouse ^{(nl)} ^{(fr)}	Yes		Borgloon	Kroonstraat 19	50.80268°N 5.34509°E	31787 Info	
house ^{(nl)} ^{(fr)}	Yes		Borgloon	Kroonstraat 25	50.80275°N 5.34545°E	31788 Info	
neo-classical mansion ^{(nl)} ^{(fr)}	Yes		Borgloon	Kroonstraat 27	50.80254°N 5.34557°E	31789 Info	
The Crown inn ^{(nl)} ^{(fr)}	Yes		Borgloon	Kroonstraat 31	50.80255°N 5.34598°E	31790 Info	
Hall ^{(nl)} ^{(fr)}	Yes		Borgloon	Markt	50.80240°N 5.34321°E	31791 Info	More images
Town house ^{(nl)} ^{(fr)}	Yes		Borgloon	Markt 1	50.80285°N 5.34325°E	31792 Info	
house ^{(nl)} ^{(fr)}	Yes		Borgloon	Markt 2	50.80276°N 5.34328°E	31793 Info	
Town house ^{(nl)} ^{(fr)}	Yes		Borgloon	Markt 4	50.80274°N 5.34350°E	31794 Info	
House in Meuse Style ^{(nl)} ^{(fr)}	Yes		Borgloon	Markt 5	50.80267°N 5.34355°E	31795 Info	
Two townhouses ^{(nl)} ^{(fr)}	Yes		Borgloon	Markt 7	50.80270°N 5.34378°E	31796 Info	
Two townhouses ^{(nl)} ^{(fr)}	Yes		Borgloon	Markt 8	50.80270°N 5.34378°E	31796 Info	
House in Meuse Style ^{(nl)} ^{(fr)}	Yes		Borgloon	Markt 10	50.80237°N 5.34380°E	31797 Info	
Town house ^{(nl)} ^{(fr)}	Yes		Borgloon	Markt 13	50.80255°N 5.34285°E	31798 Info	
house ^{(nl)} ^{(fr)}	Yes		Borgloon	Markt 14	50.80260°N 5.34290°E	31799 Info	
Farmhouse Large Moth ^{(nl)} ^{(fr)}			Borgloon	Mot 1	50.80058°N 5.34751°E	31800 Info	
house ^{(nl)} ^{(fr)}			Borgloon	Neremstraat 1	50.79748°N 5.34089°E	31801 Info	
Brigit Tijn Monastery ^{(nl)} ^{(fr)}	Yes		Borgloon	Nieuwland	50.80328°N 5.34596°E	31802 Info	
Residues of a building ^{(nl)} ^{(fr)}	Yes		Borgloon	Nieuwland	50.80332°N 5.34351°E	31803 Info	
house ^{(nl)} ^{(fr)}			Borgloon	Nieuwland 22	50.80312°N 5.34424°E	31804 Info	
Mansion ^{(nl)} ^{(fr)}	Yes		Borgloon	Padonck 2	50.80160°N 5.34649°E	31806 Info	
Mansion ^{(nl)} ^{(fr)}	Yes		Borgloon	Padonck 3	50.80160°N 5.34649°E	31806 Info	
Kapelanie ^{(nl)} ^{(fr)}	Yes		Borgloon	Padonck 10	50.80104°N 5.34551°E	31807 Info	
Corner ^{(nl)} ^{(fr)}			Borgloon	Papenstraat 2	50.80219°N 5.34346°E	31808 Info	
Two town houses ^{(nl)} ^{(fr)}			Borgloon	Papenstraat 3	50.80229°N 5.34393°E	31809 Info	
Two town houses ^{(nl)} ^{(fr)}			Borgloon	Papenstraat 5	50.80229°N 5.34393°E	31809 Info	
house ^{(nl)} ^{(fr)}			Borgloon	Papenstraat 4	50.80215°N 5.34356°E	31810 Info	
house ^{(nl)} ^{(fr)}			Borgloon	Papenstraat 11	50.80219°N 5.34425°E	31811 Info	
Neoclassical mansion ^{(nl)} ^{(fr)}	Yes		Borgloon	Papenstraat 13	50.80217°N 5.34439°E	31812 Info	
house ^{(nl)} ^{(fr)}			Borgloon	St Rochuslaan 1	50.80206°N 5.35263°E	31813 Info	
Parish St. Odolphus and cloister ^{(nl)} ^{(fr)}	Yes		Borgloon	Speelhof	50.80123°N 5.34507°E	31816 Info	More images
U-shaped mansion ^{(nl)} ^{(fr)}	Yes		Borgloon	Speelhof 5	50.80212°N 5.34500°E	31817 Info	
Neoclassical mansion ^{(nl)} ^{(fr)}	Yes		Borgloon	Speelhof 6	50.80202°N 5.34548°E	31818 Info	
Corner ^{(nl)} ^{(fr)}	Yes		Borgloon	Speelhof 7	50.80180°N 5.34565°E	31819 Info	
Canon House ^{(nl)} ^{(fr)}	Yes		Borgloon	Speelhof 9	50.80166°N 5.34551°E	31820 Info	
Canon House ^{(nl)} ^{(fr)}	Yes		Borgloon	Speelhof 10	50.80153°N 5.34569°E	31821 Info	
Rectory ^{(nl)} ^{(fr)}	Yes		Borgloon	Speelhof 12	50.80098°N 5.34513°E	31822 Info	
Syrup Factory Wijnants ^{(nl)} ^{(fr)}			Borgloon	Stationsstraat	50.81019°N 5.34382°E	31823 Info	
Syrup Distillery Wijnants-Green Daels ^{(nl)} ^{(fr)}	Yes		Borgloon	Stationsstraat 56	50.81058°N 5.34465°E	31824 Info	More images
Syrup Factory Meekers-Poncelet ^{(nl)} ^{(fr)}			Borgloon	Sittardstraat 8	50.81123°N 5.34208°E	31825 Info	
Syrup Factory Meekers-Poncelet ^{(nl)} ^{(fr)}			Borgloon	Sittardstraat 10	50.81123°N 5.34208°E	31825 Info	
Farmhouse of 1902 ^{(nl)} ^{(fr)}			Borgloon	Stationsstraat 10	50.80483°N 5.34301°E	31826 Info	
Farmer house ^{(nl)} ^{(fr)}			Borgloon	Stationsstraat 13	50.80517°N 5.34242°E	31827 Info	
Eclectic mansion ^{(nl)} ^{(fr)}	Yes		Borgloon	Stationsstraat 29	50.80649°N 5.34287°E	31828 Info	
Interwar Property ^{(nl)} ^{(fr)}	Yes		Borgloon	Stationsstraat 31	50.80676°N 5.34291°E	31829 Info	
detached mansion ^{(nl)} ^{(fr)}	Yes		Borgloon	Stationsstraat 34	50.80695°N 5.34426°E	31830 Info	
service buildings ^{(nl)} ^{(fr)}	Yes		Borgloon	Stationsstraat 38	50.80767°N 5.34429°E	31831 Info	
house ^{(nl)} ^{(fr)}			Borgloon	Stationsstraat 40	50.80789°N 5.34392°E	31832 Info	
Single residential house ^{(nl)} ^{(fr)}			Borgloon	Stationsstraat 52	50.80883°N 5.34395°E	31833 Info	
Villa in eclectic style ^{(nl)} ^{(fr)}			Borgloon	Stationsstraat 58	50.80956°N 5.34326°E	31834 Info	
house ^{(nl)} ^{(fr)}	Yes		Borgloon	Steenstraat 8	50.80186°N 5.34610°E	31835 Info	
Schaberg Chapel or Chapel of Our Lady of Sorrows- ^{(nl)} ^{(fr)}	Yes		Borgloon	Tongersesteenweg	50.80276°N 5.34844°E	31836 Info	
house ^{(nl)} ^{(fr)}			Borgloon	Tongersesteenweg 1	50.80291°N 5.34898°E	31837 Info	
Eclectic mansion ^{(nl)} ^{(fr)}			Borgloon	Tongersesteenweg 15	50.80256°N 5.34974°E	31838 Info	
house ^{(nl)} ^{(fr)}			Borgloon	Tongersesteenweg 20	50.80203°N 5.34933°E	31839 Info	
house ^{(nl)} ^{(fr)}			Borgloon	Tongersesteenweg 23	50.80227°N 5.35041°E	31840 Info	
house ^{(nl)} ^{(fr)}			Borgloon	Tongersesteenweg 26	50.80197°N 5.34988°E	31841 Info	
Single residential house ^{(nl)} ^{(fr)}			Borgloon	Tongersesteenweg 28	50.80181°N 5.35037°E	31842 Info	
St. Roch Chapel ^{(nl)} ^{(fr)}			Borgloon	Tongersesteenweg	50.80103°N 5.35303°E	31843 Info	
Corner house ^{(nl)} ^{(fr)}			Borgloon	Tongersestraat 1	50.80221°N 5.34640°E	31845 Info	
Corner house ^{(nl)} ^{(fr)}			Borgloon	Tongersestraat 5	50.80225°N 5.34671°E	31846 Info	
Townhouse ^{(nl)} ^{(fr)}			Borgloon	Tongersestraat 7	50.80233°N 5.34683°E	31847 Info	
house ^{(nl)} ^{(fr)}	Yes		Borgloon	Tongersestraat 16	50.80204°N 5.34731°E	31848 Info	
house ^{(nl)} ^{(fr)}			Borgloon	Tongersestraat 30	50.80231°N 5.34798°E	31849 Info	
house ^{(nl)} ^{(fr)}			Borgloon	Wellenstraat 16	50.80377°N 5.34256°E	31850 Info	
City Farm ^{(nl)} ^{(fr)}			Borgloon	Wellenstraat 22	50.80397°N 5.34258°E	31851 Info	
Eclectic mansion ^{(nl)} ^{(fr)}			Borgloon	Wellenstraat 35	50.80429°N 5.34214°E	31852 Info	
Manshovenhof, closed farm ^{(nl)} ^{(fr)}	Yes		Borgloon	Manshoven 1	50.77933°N 5.35516°E	31853 Info	
New Mill ^{(nl)} ^{(fr)}			Borgloon	Nieuwmolen 1	50.81114°N 5.30622°E	31854 Info	
Rullingen Castle with English park ^{(nl)} ^{(fr)}	Yes		Borgloon	Rullingen 1	50.81497°N 5.31817°E	31855 Info	
Parish Church Saint-Lambert ^{(nl)} ^{(fr)}			Borgloon	Broekomstraat	50.78232°N 5.33220°E	31856 Info	
section home and school ^{(nl)} ^{(fr)}			Borgloon	Broekomstraat 2	50.79075°N 5.33576°E	31857 Info	
Village house ^{(nl)} ^{(fr)}			Borgloon	Broekomstraat 29	50.78249°N 5.33302°E	31858 Info	
St. Roch Chapel ^{(nl)} ^{(fr)}			Borgloon	Kapelstraat	50.78434°N 5.33040°E	31859 Info	
Two farmhouses and cross barn ^{(nl)} ^{(fr)}			Borgloon	Kapelstraat 42	50.78524°N 5.32811°E	31860 Info	
Two farmhouses and cross barn ^{(nl)} ^{(fr)}			Borgloon	Kapelstraat 44	50.78524°N 5.32811°E	31860 Info	
Two farmhouses and cross barn ^{(nl)} ^{(fr)}			Borgloon	Kapelstraat 46	50.78524°N 5.32811°E	31860 Info	
Watermill Wijngaardmolen ^{(nl)} ^{(fr)}			Borgloon	Molenberg 17	50.78535°N 5.32172°E	31861 Info	
Rectory ^{(nl)} ^{(fr)}			Borgloon	Koekelbronstraat 21	50.78119°N 5.33433°E	31862 Info	
Closed farm ^{(nl)} ^{(fr)}			Borgloon	Sassenbroekstraat 5	50.77888°N 5.34118°E	31863 Info	
Sassenbroek mill ^{(nl)} ^{(fr)}			Borgloon	Sassenbroekstraat 7	50.77821°N 5.34139°E	31864 Info	
Spacious farmhouse ^{(nl)} ^{(fr)}			Borgloon	Sassenbroekstraat 9	50.77940°N 5.34246°E	31865 Info	
Castle Bellevue ^{(nl)} ^{(fr)}	Yes		Borgloon	Bellevuestraat 70	50.83298°N 5.38810°E	31866 Info	
Semi-closed farm ^{(nl)} ^{(fr)}			Borgloon	Elleboogstraat 18A	50.82536°N 5.37895°E	31867 Info	
Farm with U-shaped construction ^{(nl)} ^{(fr)}			Borgloon	Elleboogstraat 36	50.82942°N 5.38048°E	31868 Info	
Closed farm Oude Winning ^{(nl)} ^{(fr)}	Yes		Borgloon	Haagsmeerstraat 37	50.83302°N 5.37709°E	31869 Info	
Castle farm ^{(nl)} ^{(fr)}	Yes		Borgloon	Haagsmeerstraat 39	50.83611°N 5.37691°E	31870 Info	
Castle Haagsmeer ^{(nl)} ^{(fr)}	Yes		Borgloon	Haagsmeerstraat 40	50.83656°N 5.37676°E	31871 Info	
Wooden cross ^{(nl)} ^{(fr)}	Yes		Borgloon	Hoogstraat	50.78264°N 5.35523°E	31872 Info	
Semi-closed farm ^{(nl)} ^{(fr)}	Yes		Borgloon	Hoogstraat 7	50.82186°N 5.39222°E	31873 Info	
Castle Gorsleeuw ^{(nl)} ^{(fr)}	Yes		Borgloon	Hoogstraat 33	50.82440°N 5.39559°E	31874 Info	
Castle Gorsleeuw ^{(nl)} ^{(fr)}	Yes		Borgloon	Hoogstraat 35	50.82440°N 5.39559°E	31874 Info	
Riding school ^{(nl)} ^{(fr)}	Yes		Borgloon	Hoogstraat	50.82316°N 5.39573°E	31875 Info	
Monumental bakehouse ^{(nl)} ^{(fr)}	Yes		Borgloon	Hoogstraat	50.82327°N 5.39587°E	31876 Info	
cast iron pump ^{(nl)} ^{(fr)}	Yes		Borgloon	Martinusstraat	50.82345°N 5.39687°E	31877 Info	
St. Martin Parish ^{(nl)} ^{(fr)}	Yes		Borgloon	Martinusstraat	50.82329°N 5.39635°E	31878 Info	More images
Semi-closed farm ^{(nl)} ^{(fr)}			Borgloon	Martinusstraat 20	50.82152°N 5.39438°E	31879 Info	
Chapel ^{(nl)} ^{(fr)}			Borgloon	Martinusstraat	50.82178°N 5.39430°E	31880 Info	
School teacher's house ^{(nl)} ^{(fr)}			Borgloon	Martinusstraat 23	50.82215°N 5.39628°E	31881 Info	
Rectory ^{(nl)} ^{(fr)}	Yes		Borgloon	Martinusstraat 34	50.82284°N 5.39616°E	31882 Info	
Closed farm ^{(nl)} ^{(fr)}	Yes		Borgloon	Martinusstraat 35	50.82312°N 5.39741°E	31883 Info	
Chapel of Our Lady of La Salette ^{(nl)} ^{(fr)}	Yes		Borgloon	Mettekovenstraat	50.82357°N 5.38040°E	31884 Info	
Castle Opleeuw ^{(nl)} ^{(fr)}	Yes		Borgloon	Mettekovenstraat 2	50.82288°N 5.38410°E	31885 Info	
Castle Opleeuw ^{(nl)} ^{(fr)}	Yes		Borgloon	Mettekovenstraat 3	50.82288°N 5.38410°E	31885 Info	
Castle Opleeuw ^{(nl)} ^{(fr)}	Yes		Borgloon	Mettekovenstraat 4	50.82288°N 5.38410°E	31885 Info	
Castle Opleeuw ^{(nl)} ^{(fr)}	Yes		Borgloon	Mettekovenstraat 5	50.82288°N 5.38410°E	31885 Info	
Kasteelhoeve ^{(nl)} ^{(fr)}	Yes		Borgloon	Mettekovenstraat 1	50.82232°N 5.38369°E	31886 Info	
section school ^{(nl)} ^{(fr)}			Borgloon	Mettekovenstraat 8	50.82388°N 5.37963°E	31887 Info	
Opleeuwkruis ^{(nl)} ^{(fr)}			Borgloon	Opleeuwstraat	50.82002°N 5.37344°E	31888 Info	
Farm with L-shaped layout ^{(nl)} ^{(fr)}			Borgloon	Opleeuwstraat 63	50.82632°N 5.38158°E	31889 Info	
Dwelling with rear structure of lattice ^{(nl)} ^{(fr)}			Borgloon	Opleeuwstraat 69	50.82528°N 5.38039°E	31890 Info	
elongated farm ^{(nl)} ^{(fr)}			Borgloon	Opleeuwstraat 71	50.82573°N 5.38010°E	31891 Info	
Farm Fonteinhof ^{(nl)} ^{(fr)}	Yes		Borgloon	Fonteinhof 1	50.80291°N 5.30860°E	31892 Info	
Farm Fonteinhof ^{(nl)} ^{(fr)}	Yes		Borgloon	Fonteinhof 2	50.80291°N 5.30860°E	31892 Info	
St. Dionysius Parish Church ^{(nl)} ^{(fr)}	Yes		Borgloon	Gotemstraat 54	50.80458°N 5.31061°E	31893 Info	
War Memorial ^{(nl)} ^{(fr)}	Yes		Borgloon	Gotemstraat	50.80423°N 5.31024°E	31894 Info	
Pedestrian Tunnel ^{(nl)} ^{(fr)}			Borgloon	Gotemstraat	50.80520°N 5.31140°E	31895 Info	
section home and school ^{(nl)} ^{(fr)}	Yes		Borgloon	Gotemstraat 5	50.80392°N 5.31095°E	31896 Info	
Rectory ^{(nl)} ^{(fr)}	Yes		Borgloon	Gotemstraat 56	50.80438°N 5.30995°E	31897 Info	
Farmhouse ^{(nl)} ^{(fr)}			Borgloon	St-Truidersteenweg 210	50.80513°N 5.31656°E	31898 Info	
elongated farm ^{(nl)} ^{(fr)}			Borgloon	St-Truidersteenweg 247	50.80509°N 5.31102°E	31899 Info	
Farmhouse ^{(nl)} ^{(fr)}			Borgloon	St-Truidersteenweg 249	50.80519°N 5.31001°E	31900 Info	
Former oil mill on the Herk ^{(nl)} ^{(fr)}			Borgloon	St-Truidersteenweg 251	50.80517°N 5.30452°E	31901 Info	
Mansion Les Ramiers ^{(nl)} ^{(fr)}			Borgloon	St-Truidersteenweg 260	50.80564°N 5.30986°E	31902 Info	
Parish Church St. Servatius ^{(nl)} ^{(fr)}	Yes		Borgloon	Grootloonstraat 100	50.79369°N 5.36177°E	31903 Info	More images
Closed Servaes farm farm ^{(nl)} ^{(fr)}	Yes		Borgloon	Grootloonstraat 101	50.79391°N 5.36269°E	31904 Info	
Farmhouse ^{(nl)} ^{(fr)}			Borgloon	Grootloonstraat 114	50.79207°N 5.36329°E	31905 Info	
Semi-closed farm ^{(nl)} ^{(fr)}	Yes		Borgloon	Grootloonstraat 130	50.79238°N 5.36643°E	31906 Info	
Remains closed farm ^{(nl)} ^{(fr)}	Yes		Borgloon	Grootloonstraat	50.79262°N 5.37085°E	31907 Info	
Remains tram bridge ^{(nl)} ^{(fr)}			Borgloon	Tongersesteenweg	50.79327°N 5.37515°E	31908 Info	
Closed farm ^{(nl)} ^{(fr)}			Borgloon	Tongersesteenweg 210	50.79467°N 5.36832°E	31909 Info	
Parish Church Saint-Lambert ^{(nl)} ^{(fr)}			Borgloon	Lambertusstraat	50.79851°N 5.32954°E	31910 Info	
elongated farm ^{(nl)} ^{(fr)}			Borgloon	Bartholijnsstraat 9	50.80797°N 5.27506°E	31911 Info	
Semi-closed farm ^{(nl)} ^{(fr)}			Borgloon	Beekstraat 1	50.81124°N 5.28668°E	31912 Info	
Rest of a farm ^{(nl)} ^{(fr)}			Borgloon	Bergstraat 15	50.81278°N 5.28867°E	31914 Info	
Farmhouse with separate components ^{(nl)} ^{(fr)}			Borgloon	Bergstraat 24	50.81191°N 5.29109°E	31915 Info	
Villa 't Daelhof ^{(nl)} ^{(fr)}			Borgloon	Bergstraat 26	50.81219°N 5.29194°E	31916 Info	
St. Roch Chapel ^{(nl)} ^{(fr)}			Borgloon	Daalhofstraat 7	50.81044°N 5.29122°E	31917 Info	
Farmhouse ^{(nl)} ^{(fr)}			Borgloon	Daalhofstraat 27	50.80893°N 5.28994°E	31918 Info	
Cross Barn ^{(nl)} ^{(fr)}			Borgloon	Daalhofstraat 6	50.81003°N 5.29055°E	31919 Info	
Jongmans Chapel ^{(nl)} ^{(fr)}			Borgloon	Daalstraat 6	50.82610°N 5.29189°E	31920 Info	
elongated farm ^{(nl)} ^{(fr)}			Borgloon	Daalstraat 35	50.82922°N 5.28982°E	31922 Info	
Remains railway bridge 1879 ^{(nl)} ^{(fr)}			Borgloon	Hamstraat	50.80788°N 5.29639°E	31923 Info	
Watermill Ham ^{(nl)} ^{(fr)}			Borgloon	Hamstraat 58	50.80710°N 5.29682°E	31924 Info	
Hoen Hove Mill ^{(nl)} ^{(fr)}			Borgloon	Hoenshovenstraat 5	50.80219°N 5.29065°E	31925 Info	
house ^{(nl)} ^{(fr)}			Borgloon	Hoepertingenstraat 3	50.81250°N 5.28574°E	31926 Info	
elongated farm ^{(nl)} ^{(fr)}			Borgloon	Hoepertingenstraat 7	50.81242°N 5.28528°E	31927 Info	
Farm ^{(nl)} ^{(fr)}			Borgloon	Hoepertingenstraat 14	50.81296°N 5.28486°E	31928 Info	
Farm ^{(nl)} ^{(fr)}			Borgloon	Hoepertingenstraat 21	50.81214°N 5.28333°E	31929 Info	
Residue of an elongated farm ^{(nl)} ^{(fr)}			Borgloon	Hoepertingenstraat 22	50.81254°N 5.28397°E	31930 Info	
Paanhuis, brewery ^{(nl)} ^{(fr)}			Borgloon	Hoepertingenstraat 26	50.81251°N 5.28332°E	31931 Info	
house ^{(nl)} ^{(fr)}			Borgloon	Hoepertingenstraat 38	50.81210°N 5.28189°E	31932 Info	
Bartholin Mining ^{(nl)} ^{(fr)}			Borgloon	Bartholijnsstraat 1	50.80901°N 5.27376°E	31933 Info	
Bartholin Mining ^{(nl)} ^{(fr)}			Borgloon	Hoepertingenstraat 89	50.80901°N 5.27376°E	31933 Info	
Bartholin Mining ^{(nl)} ^{(fr)}			Borgloon	Hoepertingenstraat 91	50.80901°N 5.27376°E	31933 Info	
Parish Church St. Vedastus ^{(nl)} ^{(fr)}	Yes		Borgloon	Vedastusstraat 4	50.81167°N 5.28469°E	31934 Info	More images
Castle Hoepertingen ^{(nl)} ^{(fr)}	Yes		Borgloon	Kasteelstraat 10	50.81081°N 5.28316°E	31935 Info	More images
Double House ^{(nl)} ^{(fr)}			Borgloon	Kasteelstraat 2	50.81172°N 5.28344°E	31936 Info	
Closed farm ^{(nl)} ^{(fr)}	Yes		Borgloon	Langegrachtstraat 4	50.81321°N 5.28460°E	31937 Info	
Closed farm ^{(nl)} ^{(fr)}	Yes		Borgloon	Langegrachtstraat 6	50.81321°N 5.28460°E	31937 Info	
Detached villa ^{(nl)} ^{(fr)}			Borgloon	Smisstraat 20	50.81371°N 5.28616°E	31938 Info	
Chapel of St. Job ^{(nl)} ^{(fr)}	Yes		Borgloon	Truierweg	50.81290°N 5.29386°E	31939 Info	
Closed farm ^{(nl)} ^{(fr)}			Borgloon	Truierweg 55		31940 Info	
U-shaped farm ^{(nl)} ^{(fr)}	Yes		Borgloon	Truierweg 8	50.81315°N 5.29166°E	31941 Info	
Closed farm ^{(nl)} ^{(fr)}			Borgloon	Truierweg 81	50.81313°N 5.29491°E	31942 Info	
Rectory ^{(nl)} ^{(fr)}	Yes		Borgloon	Vedastusstraat 2	50.81184°N 5.28569°E	31944 Info	
Chapel of Our Lady of Good Peace ^{(nl)} ^{(fr)}	Yes		Borgloon	Helshovenstraat 23		31946 Info	More images
Farm ^{(nl)} ^{(fr)}			Borgloon	Helshovenstraat 16	50.79265°N 5.27509°E	31947 Info	
Closed farm ^{(nl)} ^{(fr)}	Yes		Borgloon	Helshovenstraat 18	50.79225°N 5.27479°E	31948 Info	
Inge Engel Mill ^{(nl)} ^{(fr)}			Borgloon	Helshovenstraat 33	50.79724°N 5.28140°E	31949 Info	
Chapel ^{(nl)} ^{(fr)}			Borgloon	Broekstraat	50.80332°N 5.39633°E	31950 Info	
Chapel of Our Lady of Peace ^{(nl)} ^{(fr)}			Borgloon	Broekstraat	50.80212°N 5.39151°E	31951 Info	
Spacious villa ^{(nl)} ^{(fr)}			Borgloon	Jesserenstraat 125	50.80230°N 5.39894°E	31953 Info	
Syrup Factory ^{(nl)} ^{(fr)}			Borgloon	Jesserenplein	50.80287°N 5.39864°E	31954 Info	
Train station Jesseren ^{(nl)} ^{(fr)}			Borgloon	Jesserenplein 2	50.80338°N 5.39859°E	31955 Info	
Freight Station ^{(nl)} ^{(fr)}			Borgloon	Jesserenplein	50.80286°N 5.39912°E	31956 Info	More images
detached house ^{(nl)} ^{(fr)}			Borgloon	Jesserenplein 5	50.80318°N 5.39831°E	31957 Info	
Holy Cross Parish church ^{(nl)} ^{(fr)}			Borgloon	Jesserenstraat 48	50.80600°N 5.39100°E	31959 Info	More images
section house, school and teacher's house ^{(nl)} ^{(fr)}			Borgloon	Jesserenstraat 57	50.80633°N 5.38836°E	31960 Info	
Closed farm ^{(nl)} ^{(fr)}			Borgloon	Jesserenstraat 68	50.80583°N 5.38928°E	31961 Info	
Closed farm ^{(nl)} ^{(fr)}			Borgloon	Jesserenstraat 69	50.80629°N 5.39018°E	31962 Info	
Martin Farm ^{(nl)} ^{(fr)}	Yes		Borgloon	Jesserenstraat 83	50.80557°N 5.39359°E	31964 Info	
Closed farm ^{(nl)} ^{(fr)}			Borgloon	Jesserenstraat 90	50.80542°N 5.39135°E	31965 Info	
Remains of a closed farm ^{(nl)} ^{(fr)}			Borgloon	Jesserenstraat 92	50.80551°N 5.39181°E	31966 Info	
Farm ^{(nl)} ^{(fr)}			Borgloon	Kreelovenstraat 6	50.80468°N 5.39098°E	31967 Info	
Crosier Monastery Colen ^{(nl)} ^{(fr)}	Yes		Borgloon	Colenstraat	50.81458°N 5.35746°E	31968 Info	
Crosier Monastery Colen ^{(nl)} ^{(fr)}	Yes		Borgloon	Colenstraat 1	50.81458°N 5.35746°E	31968 Info	
L-shaped farmhouse ^{(nl)} ^{(fr)}			Borgloon	Heuvelstraat 3	50.81651°N 5.36771°E	31969 Info	
Kasteelhoeve Hagebroek ^{(nl)} ^{(fr)}			Borgloon	Heuvelstraat 11	50.81709°N 5.36501°E	31970 Info	
Rectory ^{(nl)} ^{(fr)}			Borgloon	Leemzaal 35	50.81633°N 5.36151°E	31971 Info	
Chapel ^{(nl)} ^{(fr)}			Borgloon	Nielstraat 40A	50.82558°N 5.35575°E	31972 Info	
Syrup Distillery Coenen ^{(nl)} ^{(fr)}			Borgloon	Nielstraat 21	50.81743°N 5.36091°E	31973 Info	
Detached corner house ^{(nl)} ^{(fr)}			Borgloon	Odiliastraat 5	50.81504°N 5.36507°E	31974 Info	
Chapel ^{(nl)} ^{(fr)}			Borgloon	Oorsprongstraat	50.82351°N 5.36361°E	31975 Info	
section house ^{(nl)} ^{(fr)}			Borgloon	Oorsprongstraat 5	50.81827°N 5.36478°E	31976 Info	
Closed farm ^{(nl)} ^{(fr)}			Borgloon	Oorsprongstraat 39	50.82153°N 5.36376°E	31977 Info	
Farmhouse ^{(nl)} ^{(fr)}			Borgloon	Rullecovenstraat 105	50.81136°N 5.36195°E	31978 Info	
Remains closed farm ^{(nl)} ^{(fr)}			Borgloon	Rullecovenstraat 115	50.81364°N 5.36619°E	31979 Info	
Closed farm ^{(nl)} ^{(fr)}			Borgloon	Rullecovenstraat 120	50.81250°N 5.36593°E	31980 Info	
Single residential house ^{(nl)} ^{(fr)}			Borgloon	Rullecovenstraat 121	50.81458°N 5.36652°E	31981 Info	

== See also ==
- List of onroerend erfgoed in Limburg (Belgium)
- Borgloon
