= Rullingen Castle =

Castle in Limburg, Belgium

Coordinates: 50.815°N 5.318°E

- Belgium
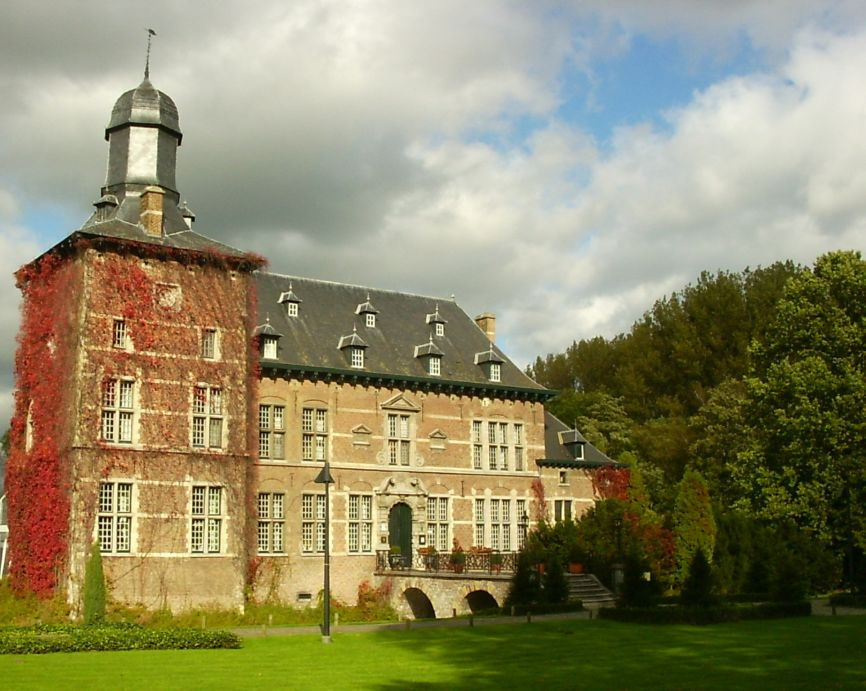

Site information
- Type: Castle

Rullingen Castle (Dutch: Kasteel van Rullingen) is a castle in Kuttekoven in the municipality of Borgloon, province of Limburg, Belgium. Its situation in the valley of the Herk is very scenic.

The first recorded lord of Rullingen was Eggebert van Ruelingen, a vassal of Arnold II, Count of Loon (d 1138 or -39). The medieval castle was reconstructed, probably in the 1630s, as a typical moated castle of the Meuse valley, although the moat has been filled up in more recent times. A serious fire in 1920 destroyed part of the building, and reconstruction works lasted from 1921 to 1935.

The castle was acquired by the government of the province of Belgian Limburg. It is now used as a hotel.

== See also ==
- List of castles in Belgium

== Sources ==
- Rullingen Castle official website
