= List of protected heritage sites in Borgloon (part 2) =

This table shows an overview of the protected heritage sites in the Flemish town Borgloon. This list is part of Belgium's national heritage.

Object	Status^{?}	Year/architect	Town/section	Address	Coordinates	Number^{?}	Image
Syrup Distillery ^{(nl)} ^{(fr)}			Borgloon	Rullecovenstraat 136	50.81444°N 5.36729°E	31982 Info	
Syrup Distillery ^{(nl)} ^{(fr)}			Borgloon	Rullecovenstraat 138	50.81444°N 5.36729°E	31982 Info	
Parish Church St. Pantaleon ^{(nl)} ^{(fr)}	Yes		Borgloon	Zilverstraat 17A	50.81639°N 5.36296°E	31983 Info	
War Memorial ^{(nl)} ^{(fr)}			Borgloon	Zilverstraat	50.81622°N 5.36264°E	31984 Info	
School ^{(nl)} ^{(fr)}			Borgloon	Zilverstraat 18	50.81634°N 5.36323°E	31985 Info	
Farm with cafe ^{(nl)} ^{(fr)}			Borgloon	Zilverstraat 20	50.81676°N 5.36283°E	31986 Info	
Farm Defastre ^{(nl)} ^{(fr)}			Borgloon	Bellingstraat 2	50.81123°N 5.36670°E	31987 Info	
Farm Pexters ^{(nl)} ^{(fr)}	Yes		Borgloon	Graeth 7	50.80437°N 5.33253°E	31988 Info	
house ^{(nl)} ^{(fr)}			Borgloon	Graeth 8	50.80465°N 5.33128°E	31989 Info	
Farm with loose components ^{(nl)} ^{(fr)}	Yes		Borgloon	Kleestraat 10	50.80945°N 5.32678°E	31990 Info	
Farm with loose components ^{(nl)} ^{(fr)}			Borgloon	Kleestraat 11	50.80956°N 5.32722°E	31991 Info	
The old farmhouse and castle Clee ^{(nl)} ^{(fr)}	Yes		Borgloon	Kleestraat 18	50.81268°N 5.33392°E	31993 Info	
Klee The Castle ^{(nl)} ^{(fr)}	Yes		Borgloon	Kleestraat 20	50.81345°N 5.33505°E	31994 Info	
Parish Church of St John the Baptist ^{(nl)} ^{(fr)}	Yes		Borgloon	Kuttekovenstraat	50.80794°N 5.33138°E	31995 Info	More images
Railway Bridge ^{(nl)} ^{(fr)}	Yes		Borgloon	Kuttekovenstraat	50.80900°N 5.33054°E	31996 Info	
Chapel of Our Lady of Lourdes ^{(nl)} ^{(fr)}	Yes		Borgloon	Kuttekovenstraat	50.80986°N 5.32991°E	31997 Info	
Rectory ^{(nl)} ^{(fr)}	Yes		Borgloon	Kuttekovenstraat 9	50.80867°N 5.32994°E	31998 Info	
Smeets Farm ^{(nl)} ^{(fr)}			Borgloon	Widdingen 1	50.80310°N 5.26278°E	31999 Info	
St. Joseph Parish ^{(nl)} ^{(fr)}			Borgloon	Dionysius van Leeuwenstraat	50.80407°N 5.26237°E	32000 Info	More images
Cemetery ^{(nl)} ^{(fr)}			Borgloon	Dionysius van Leeuwenstraat	50.80362°N 5.26133°E	32001 Info	
Eutropiaput ^{(nl)} ^{(fr)}			Borgloon	Dionysius van Leeuwenstraat	50.80330°N 5.26091°E	32002 Info	
Castle Rijkel ^{(nl)} ^{(fr)}	Yes		Borgloon	Dionysius van Leeuwenstraat 23	50.80335°N 5.26086°E	32003 Info	
Rectory ^{(nl)} ^{(fr)}			Borgloon	Dionysius van Leeuwenstraat 25	50.80383°N 5.26230°E	32004 Info	
Parish Center ^{(nl)} ^{(fr)}			Borgloon	Dionysius van Leeuwenstraat	50.80373°N 5.26201°E	32005 Info	
Closed farm ^{(nl)} ^{(fr)}			Borgloon	Dionysius van Leeuwenstraat 26	50.80359°N 5.26240°E	32006 Info	
L-shaped farmhouse ^{(nl)} ^{(fr)}			Borgloon	Dionysius van Leeuwenstraat 27	50.80343°N 5.26163°E	32007 Info	
Broad House ^{(nl)} ^{(fr)}			Borgloon	Dionysius van Leeuwenstraat 28	50.80341°N 5.26241°E	32008 Info	
Hoeve De Schans ^{(nl)} ^{(fr)}			Borgloon	Schanzestraat 4	50.80959°N 5.25903°E	32009 Info	
section home and school ^{(nl)} ^{(fr)}			Borgloon	Schoolstraat 1	50.80841°N 5.26144°E	32010 Info	
U-shaped farm ^{(nl)} ^{(fr)}			Borgloon	Schoolstraat 13	50.80960°N 5.26109°E	32011 Info	
Chapel ^{(nl)} ^{(fr)}			Borgloon	St-Truidersteenweg	50.80822°N 5.25982°E	32012 Info	
Closed farm ^{(nl)} ^{(fr)}			Borgloon	St-Truidersteenweg 559	50.80754°N 5.26367°E	32013 Info	
Closed farm ^{(nl)} ^{(fr)}			Borgloon	St-Truidersteenweg 548	50.80852°N 5.25739°E	32014 Info	
Farm ^{(nl)} ^{(fr)}			Borgloon	St-Truidersteenweg 550	50.80931°N 5.25689°E	32015 Info	
Farm ^{(nl)} ^{(fr)}			Borgloon	St-Truidersteenweg 552	50.80931°N 5.25689°E	32015 Info	
Two identical town houses of 1912 ^{(nl)} ^{(fr)}			Borgloon	St-Truidersteenweg 560	50.80866°N 5.25496°E	32016 Info	
Two identical town houses of 1912 ^{(nl)} ^{(fr)}			Borgloon	St-Truidersteenweg 562	50.80866°N 5.25496°E	32016 Info	
Semi-closed farm of 1822 ^{(nl)} ^{(fr)}			Borgloon	St-Truidersteenweg 563	50.80774°N 5.25866°E	32017 Info	
Farm Daalhof ^{(nl)} ^{(fr)}			Borgloon	Dionysius van Leeuwenstraat 35	50.80221°N 5.26176°E	32018 Info	
Christ the King Chapel ^{(nl)} ^{(fr)}			Borgloon	Benaetsstraat	50.79136°N 5.31601°E	32019 Info	
section home and school ^{(nl)} ^{(fr)}			Borgloon	Benaetsstraat 4	50.79514°N 5.32187°E	32020 Info	
Closed farm ^{(nl)} ^{(fr)}			Borgloon	Benaetsstraat 9	50.79441°N 5.31975°E	32021 Info	
Village house ^{(nl)} ^{(fr)}			Borgloon	Benaetsstraat 11	50.79428°N 5.31934°E	32022 Info	
Semi-closed farm ^{(nl)} ^{(fr)}			Borgloon	Benaetsstraat 20	50.79277°N 5.31610°E	32023 Info	
Castle Tornaco ^{(nl)} ^{(fr)}			Borgloon	Romeinse Kassei 3	50.79229°N 5.31139°E	32024 Info	
Castle Tornaco ^{(nl)} ^{(fr)}			Borgloon	Romeinse Kassei 4	50.79229°N 5.31139°E	32024 Info	
Former syrup factory-Meekers Poncelet ^{(nl)} ^{(fr)}			Borgloon	Sittardstraat 8	50.81172°N 5.34221°E	84269 Info	
Former syrup factory-Meekers Poncelet ^{(nl)} ^{(fr)}			Borgloon	Sittardstraat 10	50.81172°N 5.34221°E	84269 Info	
Single dwelling Tivoli ^{(nl)} ^{(fr)}			Borgloon	Sittardstraat 58	50.81595°N 5.34044°E	84270 Info	
town house ^{(nl)} ^{(fr)}	Yes		Borgloon	Kroonstraat 23		200288 Info	
Pump in the village square ^{(nl)} ^{(fr)}	Yes		Borgloon	Hoogstraat	50.82335°N 5.39587°E	200291 Info	
War Memorial ^{(nl)} ^{(fr)}	Yes		Borgloon	Speelhof	50.80167°N 5.34500°E	200377 Info	
Art Deco villa ^{(nl)} ^{(fr)}	Yes		Borgloon	Stationsstraat 36	50.80737°N 5.34372°E	200388 Info	
Chapel and vault Hulsberg ^{(nl)} ^{(fr)}	Yes		Borgloon	St-Truidersteenweg	50.80160°N 5.32420°E	200690 Info	
Hulsberg Castle ^{(nl)} ^{(fr)}	Yes		Borgloon	St-Truidersteenweg 101	50.80312°N 5.32582°E	200691 Info	
House ^{(nl)} ^{(fr)}	Yes		Borgloon	Kroonstraat 21		201028 Info	

== See also ==
- List of onroerend erfgoed in Limburg (Belgium)
- Borgloon
