= N4 road (Belgium) =

Highway in Belgium

Coordinates: 50.26662°N 5.24787°E

National Route 4
- Dutch: Nationale Weg 4 French: Route nationale 4
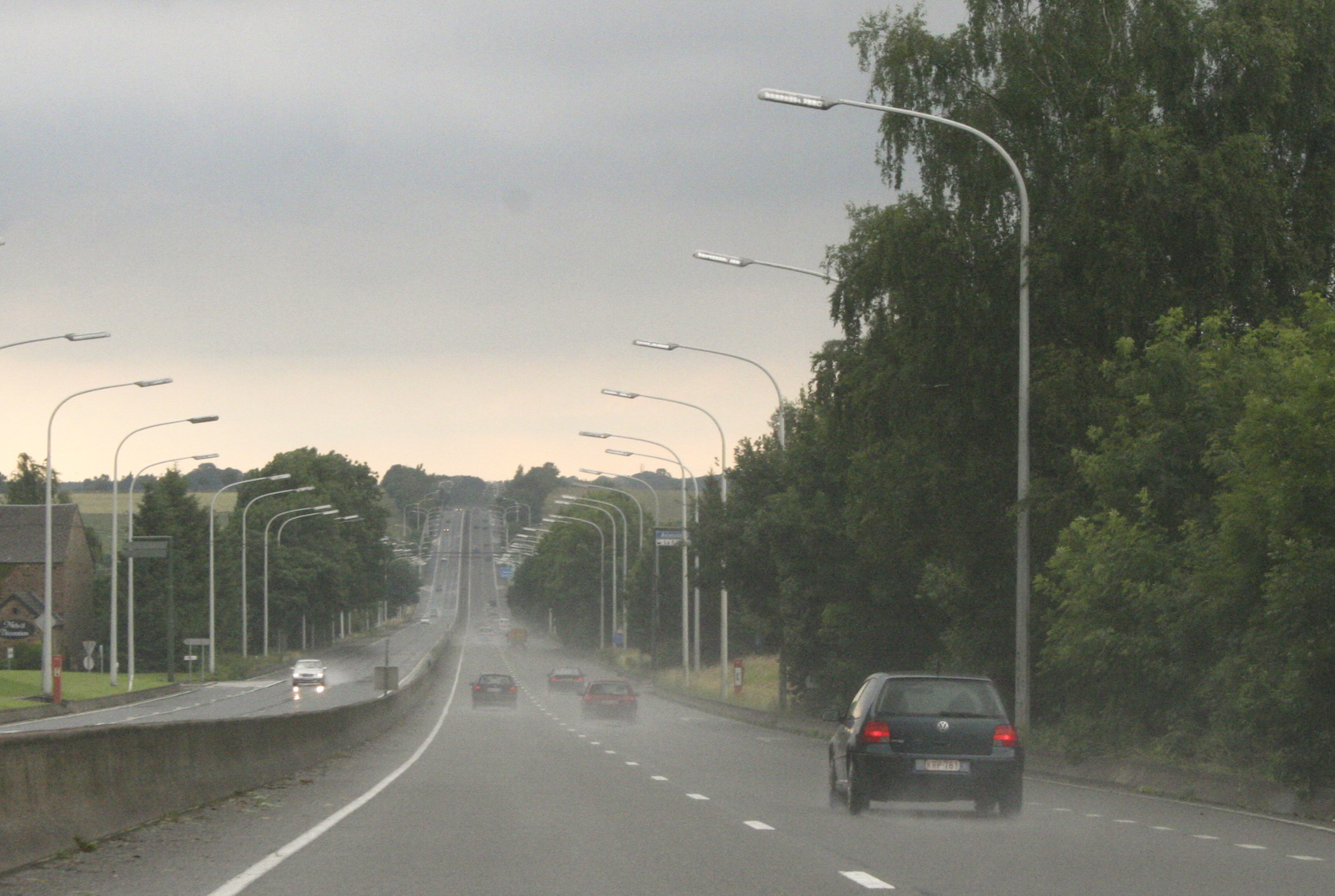
- The N4 near Assesse

Route information
- Part of E46 (between Marche and Tenneville)
- Length: 192 km (119 mi)

Major junctions
- From: Brussels
- Wavre; Namur; Marche-en-Famenne; Bastogne
- To: Arlon

Location
- Country: Belgium

Highway system
- Highways of Belgium; Motorways; National Roads

The N4 road in Belgium is a national road connecting Brussels to Luxembourg. It starts as chaussée de Wavre at Porte de Namur on the Brussels inner ring and runs south east through Wavre and Namur, Marche-en-Famenne, Bastogne, Martelange and Arlon before terminating as route de Luxembourg at the Luxembourg border. On its route is crosses the Meuse and Lessive Rivers and the Belgian Ardennes.

Before the development of motorways the N4 was a main artery for traffic going south east from Brussels and it was dotted with many friteries, cafes and petrol stations.

From the 1960s to the end of the 1980s, it has been superseded by the completion of the A4 motorway which runs from Delta in Brussels down past Arlon where shortly after it enters Luxembourg where it becomes part of the Luxembourg by-pass system until it reaches the south of the city where it turns south continuing down to Thionville and Metz in France and onwards. By diverting the traffic away from the N4 the motorway has caused the closure of most of these traditional Belgian friteries.

Outside of major towns the N4 mostly consists of dual carriageway with the opposing lanes separated by a central reservation or concrete blocks, but certain sections are still without any form of physical separation and have been the scene of many fatal accidents.

The N4 still offers a more pleasurable and scenic route to the south of Belgium for the less pressed driver and for bicyclists. The end sections remain busy routes during the rush hour due to the high number of commuters travelling to and from Brussels and Luxembourg from residential communities all over the area. Stretches of the road continue to be renovated.

The N4 crosses or borders 29 municipalities in total. 4 of them in the Brussels Capital Region, 2 in Flemish Brabant, 5 in Walloon Brabant, 7 in Namur and 11 in Luxembourg. Full municipality list below, with main municipalities in bold.

Region	Province	Municipality	Population	Length of N4 (km)
Brussels Capital Region	/	**City of Brussels**	188737	0.2
Brussels Capital Region	/	Ixelles	87052	1.4
Brussels Capital Region	/	Etterbeek	48535	1.9
Brussels Capital Region	/	Auderghem	34986	2.1
Flanders	Flemish Brabant	Tervuren	22852	0.1
Flanders	Flemish Brabant	Overijse	25888	8.7
Wallonia	Walloon Brabant	**Wavre**	35111	8.7
Wallonia	Walloon Brabant	**Ottignies-Louvain-la-Neuve**	31363	2.9
Wallonia	Walloon Brabant	Mont-Saint-Guibert	8081	2.5
Wallonia	Walloon Brabant	Walhain	7485	3.9
Wallonia	Walloon Brabant	Chastre	7727	0.3
Wallonia	Namur	**Gembloux**	26330	12.6
Wallonia	Namur	La Bruyère	9316	3.1
Wallonia	Namur	**Namur**	112559	17.6
Wallonia	Namur	Assesse	7274	11.7
Wallonia	Namur	Hamois	7386	7.5
Wallonia	Namur	Ciney	17007	8.1
Wallonia	Namur	Somme-Leuze	5975	6.5
Wallonia	Luxembourg	**Marche-en-Famenne**	17758	9.0
Wallonia	Luxembourg	Nassogne	5632	12.1
Wallonia	Luxembourg	Tenneville	2884	12.7
Wallonia	Luxembourg	Bertogne	5233	6.9
Wallonia	Luxembourg	Sainte-Ode	2655	8.9
Wallonia	Luxembourg	**Bastogne**	16618	10.1
Wallonia	Luxembourg	Vaux-sur-Sûre	6023	1.9
Wallonia	Luxembourg	Fauvillers	2368	10.4
Wallonia	Luxembourg	Martelange	1931	9.1
Wallonia	Luxembourg	Attert	5624	8.1
Wallonia	Luxembourg	**Arlon**	30818	11.8

== Junction list ==
Province	Municipality	Section	Junction	Northbound destinations	Southbound destinations
(European Union) (Belgium) (Brussels) Brussels-capital Region	City of Brussels	Brussels- Auderghem	Brussels (188.737 inh.) R20 Brussels inner ring road	Brussels	Wavre Namur
(European Union) (Belgium) (Brussels) Brussels-capital Region	Ixelles	Brussels- Auderghem	Ixelles (87.052 inh.)	Brussels	Wavre Namur
(European Union) (Belgium) (Brussels) Brussels-capital Region	Etterbeek	Brussels- Auderghem	N228a Cinquantenaire Etterbeek (48.535 inh.) N205 Cinquantenaire, Schuman railway station R21 Watermael-Boitsfort, Uccle, Schaerbeek, Evere	Brussels	Wavre Namur
(European Union) (Belgium) (Brussels) Brussels-capital Region	Auderghem	Brussels- Auderghem	Auderghem (34.986 inh.) R22 Watermael-Boitsfort, Woluwe-Saint-Pierre, Woluwe-Saint-Lambert, Brussels Airport Interruption by E411 motorway with a connection to the R0 Brussels Ring Road.	Brussels	Wavre Namur
(European Union) (Belgium) Flanders Flemish Brabant	Tervuren	Tervuren - Overijse	2 (Hoeilaart) E411 Brussels, Wavre, Namur	Brussels	Wavre Namur
(European Union) (Belgium) Flanders Flemish Brabant	Overijse	Tervuren - Overijse	Jezus-Eik (5.921 inh.) Overijse (25.888 inh.) N253 Huldenberg, Leuven, Maleizen, La Hulpe, Braine-l'Alleud N218 Maleizen, La Hulpe, Braine-l'Alleud N4b Tombeek-Center Tombeek (1.396 inh.)	Brussels	Wavre Namur
(European Union) (Belgium) Wallonia Walloon Brabant	Wavre	Wavre - Walhain	N257 Bierges-les-Wavre, Brussels (E411), Namur (E411) Wavre (35.111 inh.) Dyle N268 Basse-Wavre, Grez-Doiceau, Leuven N239 Wavre-Center, Walibi Belgium, Ottignies-Louvain-la-Neuve N243 Wavre-Center, Chaumont-Gistoux, Perwez 7 E411 Brussels, Namur, Arlon N25 Chaumont-Gistoux, Grez-Doiceau, Leuven Start of cocurrence with N25	Brussels	Gembloux Namur
(European Union) (Belgium) Wallonia Walloon Brabant	Ottignies-Louvain-la-Neuve	Wavre - Walhain	N250 Ottignies-Louvain-la-Neuve 8a (Louvain-la-Neuve) E411 Brussels, Wavre, Namur, Arlon N233 Louvain-la-Neuve-Centre, Ottignies	Wavre Brussels	Gembloux Namur
(European Union) (Belgium) Wallonia Walloon Brabant	Mont-Saint-Guibert	Wavre - Walhain	N25, N25a Court-Saint-Étienne, Mont-Saint-Guibert, Genappe, Nivelles, Chaumont-Gistoux, Brussels (E411), Namur (E411) End of cocurrence with N25 Corbais (1.351 inh.)	Wavre Brussels	Gembloux Namur
(European Union) (Belgium) Wallonia Walloon Brabant	Walhain	Wavre - Walhain	Nil-Pierreux N273 Chastre, Sombreffe	Wavre Brussels	Gembloux Namur
(European Union) (Belgium) Wallonia Walloon Brabant	Walhain / Chastre	Wavre - Walhain	The N4 forms the border between Walhain and Chastre	Wavre Brussels	Gembloux Namur
(European Union) (Belgium) Wallonia Walloon Brabant	Walhain	Wavre - Walhain	/	Wavre Brussels	Gembloux Namur
(European Union) (Belgium) Wallonia Namur	Gembloux	Gembloux - Namur	Ernage (1.301 inh.) N29 Tienen, Jodoigne, Sombreffe, Charleroi Orneau Gembloux (26.330 inh.) Lonzée (1.944 inh.) Beuzet (1.304 inh.)	Wavre Brussels	Namur
(European Union) (Belgium) Wallonia Namur	La Bruyère	Gembloux - Namur	N912 Meux, Éghezée, Sambreville, Jemeppe-sur-Sambre Bovesse (882 inh.) N904 Rhisnes, Saint-Servais 12 (Gembloux) E42 Charleroi, Mons, Liège, Brussels (E411), Arlon (E411)	Gembloux Brussels	Namur
(European Union) (Belgium) Wallonia Namur	Namur	Namur	N958 Suarlée, Floreffe N93 Sombreffe, Nivelles Belgrade (4.828 inh.) Saint-Servais (9.544 inh.) N934 La Bruyère, Saint-Marc, Vedrin-Daussoulx Namur (112.559 inh.) N91 Champion, Bouge, Éghezée, Leuven N90 Floreffe, Sambreville, Charleroi, Mons Start of cocurrency with N90 N80 Fernelmont, Hannut, Sint-Truiden N92 Wépion, Profondeville, Dinant Meuse N947 Jambes, Yvoir End of cocurrency with N90 N90 Andenne, Huy, Liège Erpent (2.823 inh.) Naninne (1.609 inh.) N941 Wierde, Mozet, Ohey, Brussels (E411), Arlon (E411), Luxembourg (Luxembourg City) (E411)	Gembloux Brussels	Marche-en-Famenne Bastogne
(European Union) (Belgium) Wallonia Namur	Assesse	Namur - Somme-Leuze	Sart-Benard (1.399 inh.) 18 E411 Namur, Brussels, Arlon, Libramont-Chevigny, Dinant, Arlon, Luxembourg(Luxembourg City) N931 Courrière, Maillen, Lustin, Andenne Gesves, Sorinne-la-Longue, Assesse Assesse, Gesves, Ohey, Huy N946 Florée, Gesves, Natoye, Yvoir	Namur	Marche-en-Famenne Bastogne
(European Union) (Belgium) Wallonia Namur	Hamois	Namur - Somme-Leuze	N921 Ohey, Andenne, Huy, Ciney, Emptinne Emptinne (989 inh.) N97 Liège, Havelange, Hamois, Dinant, Ciney, Emptinne Monin, Ciney	Namur	Marche-en-Famenne Bastogne
(European Union) (Belgium) Wallonia Namur	Ciney	Namur - Somme-Leuze	N938 Pessoux, Leignon, Achêne, Barbaux-Condroz, Maffe, Méan	Namur	Marche-en-Famenne Bastogne
(European Union) (Belgium) Wallonia Namur	Somme-Leuze	Namur - Somme-Leuze	N929 Durbuy, Rochefort, Houyet, Somme-Leuze, Haversin, Heure Sinsin Sinsin (685 inh.) Hogne (798 inh.)	Namur	Marche-en-Famenne Bastogne
(European Union) (Belgium) Wallonia Luxembourg	Marche-en-Famenne	Marche-en-Famenne - Bastogne	Aye zone industrielle Aye, Humain N839 Liège, Rochefort, Hotton, Marloie N873 Marloie, Aye, Vivalia hospital N86, N63 Marche-en-Famenne, Rochefort, Hotton, Durbuy, Liège Marche-en-Famenne (17.758 inh.) N856, N888 Waha, La Roche-en-Ardenne, Nassogne	Namur	Bastogne Arlon
(European Union) (Belgium) Wallonia Luxembourg	Nassogne	Marche-en-Famenne - Bastogne	N856 Nassogne, Harsin, Charneux N896 Harsin, Hargimont, Rochefort, Nassogne Bande, Lignières, Grune	Marche-en-Famenne Namur	Bastogne Arlon
(European Union) (Belgium) Wallonia Luxembourg	Tenneville	Marche-en-Famenne - Bastogne	N89 Champlon, La Roche-en-Ardenne, Vielsalm, Saint-Hubert, Libramont-Chevigny, Bouillon, (Charleville-Mézières, Reims) Champlon (1.141 inh.) Tenneville (1.309 inh.) Baconfoy N829 Lavacherie, Sainte-Ode, Berguème Ortheuville (75 inh.) Ourthe	Marche-en-Famenne Namur	Bastogne Arlon
(European Union) (Belgium) Wallonia Luxembourg	Tenneville / Bertogne	Marche-en-Famenne - Bastogne	The N4 forms the border between Tenneville and Bertogne.	Marche-en-Famenne Namur	Bastogne Arlon
(European Union) (Belgium) Wallonia Luxembourg	Sainte-Ode / Bertogne	Marche-en-Famenne - Bastogne	The N4 forms the border between Sainte-Ode and Bertogne.	Marche-en-Famenne Namur	Bastogne Arlon
(European Union) (Belgium) Wallonia Luxembourg	Sainte-Ode	Marche-en-Famenne - Bastogne	Lavacherie, Roumont N826 Amberloup, Bertogne, Houffalize, Libramont-Chevigny	Marche-en-Famenne Namur	Bastogne Arlon
(European Union) (Belgium) Wallonia Luxembourg	Sainte-Ode / Bertogne	Marche-en-Famenne - Bastogne	The N4 forms the border between Sainte-Ode and Bertogne. Flamierge Tillet, Houmont, Flamisoul	Marche-en-Famenne Namur	Bastogne Arlon
(European Union) (Belgium) Wallonia Luxembourg	Bertogne	Marche-en-Famenne - Bastogne	Mande-Sainte-Etienne	Marche-en-Famenne Namur	Bastogne Arlon
(European Union) (Belgium) Wallonia Luxembourg	Bastogne	Bastogne	54 (Bastogne) E25 Liège, Neufchâteau, Arlon, Luxembourg (Luxembourg City) N84 Bastogne-Center, Luxembourg (Wiltz, Diekirch) Bastogne-Center, Senonchamps N85 Bastogne-Center, Vaux-sur-Sûre, Sibret Bastogne (16.618 inh.) Bastogne-Center, Assenois N30 Bastogne-Center, Houffalize, (Wiltz, Diekirch) Remoifosse	Marche-en-Famenne Namur	Arlon Luxembourg (Luxembourg City)
(European Union) (Belgium) Wallonia Luxembourg	Bastogne / Vaux-sur-Sûre	Bastogne	The N4 forms the border between Bastogne and Vaux-sur-Sûre.	Bastogne Namur	Arlon Luxembourg (Luxembourg City)
(European Union) (Belgium) Wallonia Luxembourg	Fauvillers	Bastogne - Arlon	Hollange, Sainlez, Honville Sainlez Malmaison Fauvillers, Tintange, Warnach, Bodange	Bastogne Namur	Arlon Luxembourg (Luxembourg City)
(European Union) (Belgium) Wallonia Luxembourg	Martelange	Bastogne - Arlon	Martelange (1.931 inh.) N848 Fauvillers, Vaux-sur-Sûre, Neufchâteau Sûre Luxembourgish N23 Luxembourg (Rambrouch, Ettelbruck, Diekirch) N805 Luxembourg (Perlé)	Bastogne Namur	Arlon Luxembourg (Luxembourg City)
(European Union) (Belgium) Wallonia Luxembourg	Attert	Bastogne - Arlon	N87 Parette, Heinstert, Habay, Étalle, Virton Rodenhoff (41 inh.) Schockville (187 inh.) Attert (5.624 inh.) Attert, Schadeck, Post, Luxembourg (Redange-sur-Attert) Schadeck (116 inh.) Tontelange (922 inh.) Metzert (531 inh.)	Bastogne Namur	Arlon Luxembourg (Luxembourg City)
(European Union) (Belgium) Wallonia Luxembourg	Arlon	Arlon	N82 Virton, Étalle, Bouillon, Habay, Neufchâteau, Saint-Léger N881 Arlon-Center N882 Arlon-Center, Luxembourg (Oberpallen, Redange-sur-Attert, Diekirch, Ettelbruck) Arlon (30.818 inh.) N884 Luxembourg (Eischen, Mersch) N81, N881 Arlon-Center, Messancy, Aubange, France (Longwy), Luxembourg (Pétange) Stehnen (35 inh.)	Bastogne Namur	Luxembourg (Luxembourg City)
(European Union) (Luxembourg)	Continuation by N6 towards Steinfort, Capellen and Luxembourg City.				

== See also ==
- Province of Luxembourg
- Province of Namur
- Province of Walloon Brabant
