= Names of Belgian places in other languages =

This is a list of names of Belgian places in other languages.

== Flanders ==
Flemish Region
Dutch	West Flemish	Limburgish	German	French	Picard	Walloon
Aalst	Oalst		Aalst	Alost		
Alveringem	Oalveringem					
Antwerpen		Antwerpe	Antwerpen, Antorf	Anvers		Anverse
Ardooie	Ardôoie					
Avelgem	Oavelgem					
Baarle-Hertog				Baerle-Duc		
Beernem	Beirnem					
Beringen		Berringe				
Bever				Biévène		
Bilzen		Bilze				
Blankenberge	Blanknberge					
Bocholt		Bógget				
Borgloon		Loeën		Looz		Lô
Brakel				Bracle, Braekel		
Bredene	Brèinienge					
Bree				Brée		
Brugge			Brügge	Bruges		
De Haan	D'n Oane			Le Coq		
De Panne				La Panne		
Deerlijk	Deirlyk					
Dendermonde				Termonde		
Diepenbeek		Djoppenbeek, Diejpenbik				
Diksmuide	Diksmude			Dixmude		
Dilsen-Stokkem		Dilse-Stokkem				
Dworp				Tourneppe		
Galmaarden				Gammerages		
Gent			Gent	Gand		
Geraardsbergen				Grammont		
Halen		Hôle				
Halle				Hal		
Hamont-Achel		Haëmet-Achel				
Harelbeke	Oarlbeke					
Heers		Hiër				
Herk-de-Stad		Herk		Herck-la-Ville		
Herne				Hérinnes-lez-Enghien		
Herstappe		Herstap				
Heusden-Zolder		Heuze-Zolder				
Hoeselt		Hoeiselt				
Hooglede	Ooglee					
Houthalen-Helchteren		Hôtele-Helichtre				
Houthulst	Outulst					
Ieper	Yper		Ypern	Ypres		
Ingelmunster	Iengelmunstr					
Izegem	Yzegem					
Kapelle-op-den-Bos				Chapelle-au-Bois		
Kinrooi		Kinder				
Knokke-Heist				Knocke-Heist		
Koekelare	Kookloare, Ko'eloare					
Koksijde	Koksyde			Coxyde		
Kortessem		Kotsoeve				
Kortrijk	Kortryk, Kortrik			Courtrai		
Kraainem				Crainhem		
Kruishoutem				Cruyshautem		
Kuurne				Cuerne		
Lanaken		Lôneke				
Ledegem	Legem					
Lendelede	Lendlee					
Lens		Linse				
Leopoldsburg		Leopolsbörch		Bourg-Léopold		
Lier				Lierre		
Lo-Reninge	Lo-Rênienge					
Leuven		Leuve	Löwen	Louvain		Lovin
Lummen		Leume				
Maaseik		Mezeik				
Maasmechelen		Mechele				
Maldegem	Moaldegem					
Mechelen	Mecheln	Mechele	Mecheln	Malines		
Meeuwen-Gruitrode		Miëve-Roj				
Menen	Mêenn, Mêende			Menin		
Mesen	Mêesn			Messines	Messène	
Meulebeke	Mullebeke					
Moorslede	Môoslee, Môorslee					
Nieuwerkerken		Noërekirke				
Nieuwpoort	Nieuwpôort			Nieuport		
Oostende			Ostende	Ostende		
Oostkamp	Ôostkamp					
Oostrozebeke	Ôostrôzebeke					
Opglabbeek		Glabbek				
Oudenaarde	Oudenoarde		Oudenarde	Audenarde		
Oudenburg	Oednburg					
Poperinge	Poperienge			Poperinghe		
Retie				Rethy		
Riemst		Riems				
Roeselare	Roeseloare			Roulers		
Ronse				Renaix		
Scherpenheuvel-Zichem				Montaigu-Zichem		
Sint-Amands				Saint-Amand		
Sint-Genesius-Rode				Rhode-Saint-Genèse		
Sint-Gillis-Waas				Saint-Gilles-Waes		
Sint-Katelijne-Waver				Wavre-Sainte-Catherine		
Sint-Laureins				Saint-Laurent		
Sint-Lievens-Houtem				Hautem-Saint-Liévin		
Sint-Martens-Latem				Laethem-Saint-Martin		
Sint-Niklaas				Saint-Nicolas		
Sint-Pieters-Leeuw				Leeuw-Saint-Pierre		
Sint-Truiden		Sintruin, Sintreen		Saint-Trond		
Spiere-Helkijn	Spiere-Elkyng			Espierres-Helchin		
Staden	Stoan, Stoadn					
Temse				Tamise		
Tessenderlo		Loei				
Tienen				Tirlemont		
Tongeren		Tóngere	Tongern	Tongres		
Torhout	Toeroet			Thourout		
Veurne	Veurn			Furnes		
Vilvoorde				Vilvorde		
Vleteren	Vletern, Fletern					
Voeren		Voere		Fourons		Foron
Waregem	Woaregem					
Wellen		Wille				
Wervik				Wervicq	Wervi	
Willebroek				Willebroeck, Willebrouck		
Wingene	Wiengne					
Zedelgem	Zillegem					
Zonhoven		Zoneve				Zonôf
Zonnebeke	Zunnebeke					
Zoutleeuw				Léau		
Zuienkerke	Zuunkerke					
Zutendaal		Zietendaol				
Zwalm				Zwalin		

== Wallonia ==
Walloon Region
French	Walloon	Picard	Lorrain	Dutch	Limburgish	German	Luxembourgish
Aiseau-Presles	Åjhô-Préle						
Amay	Ama						
Amblève	Ambleve			Amel		Amel	
Andenne	Andene						
Anderlues	Anderluwe						
Anhée	Anhêye						
Ans	Anse						
Anthisnes	Antene						
Arlon	Årlon		Iérlon	Aarlen	Aarle	Arel	Arel
Ath	Ate	Ât		Aat			
Attert	Ater						Atert
Aubange	Åbindje					Ibingen	Éibeng, Éiben
Aubel	Åbe				Aobel		
Awans	Awan						
Aywaille	Aiwêye						
Baelen	Bailou			Balen			
Bassenge	Bassindje			Bitsingen			
Bastogne				Bastenaken		Bastenach	Baaschtnech
Beaumont	Biômont	Biômont					
Beauraing	Biarin						
Beauvechain	Bôvètché			Bevekom			
Belœil				Belle			
Berloz	Bierlô			Berlo			
Bernissart		Bernissåt					
Bertogne	Biertogne						
Bertrix	Bietris						
Beyne-Heusay	Binne-Heuzea						
Bièvre	Bive						
Binche	Bince						
Blegny	Blegneye						
Bouillon	Bouyon			Boolen		Beulen, Bulen	
Boussu	Boussu-dlé-Mont						
Braine-l'Alleud	Brinne-l'-Alou			Eigenbrakel			
Braine-le-Château	Brinne-Tchestea			Kasteelbrakel			
Braine-le-Comte	Brinne-e-Hinnot			’s-Gravenbrakel			
Braives	Braive						
Brugelette		Brujlete					
Brunehaut		Brunéo					
Bullange	Bollindje			Büllingen		Büllingen	
Burdinne	Beurdene						
Burg-Reuland						Burg-Reuland	Buerg-Reiland
Butgenbach						Bütgenbach	
Celles		Chièl, Chèl					
Cerfontaine	Cerfontinne						
Chapelle-lez-Herlaimont	El Tchapele						
Charleroi	Tchålerwè, Chålerwè					Karolingen	
Chastre	Tchåsse						
Châtelet	Tcheslet						
Chaudfontaine	Tchôfontinne						
Chaumont-Gistoux	Tchåmont-Djistou						
Chièvres	Chieve						
Chimay	Chimai	Chimai					
Chiny	Tchini		Tchini				
Ciney	Cînè						
Clavier	Clavir						
Colfontaine		Colfontinne					
Comblain-au-Pont	Comblin-å-Pont						
Comines-Warneton		Comène-Warneuton		Komen-Waasten			
Courcelles	Courcele						
Court-Saint-Étienne	Coû-Sint-Stiene						
Couvin	Couvè						
Crisnée	Crusnêye						
Dalhem	Dålem						
Daverdisse	Dåvdisse						
Dison	Dizon						
Doische	Dweche						
Donceel	Doncél						
Dour	Doû						
Durbuy	Derbu						
Écaussinnes	Les Scåssenes						
Éghezée	Inguezêye						
Ellezelles		Elziele		Elzele			
Enghien	Inguî			Edingen, Enge			
Engis	Indji						
Érezée	Erezêye						
Erquelinnes		Erkelene					
Esneux	Esneu						
Estaimpuis		Timpu		Steenput			
Estinnes	L' Estene						
Étalle			Etåle				
Eupen, Néau	Nèyåw				Eupe	Eupen	
Faimes	Faime						
Farciennes	Fårcene						
Fauvillers	Faiviè					Feitweiler	Fäteler
Fernelmont	Ferneamont						
Ferrières	Ferire						
Fexhe-le-Haut-Clocher	Fexhe-å-Hôt-Clokî						
Flémalle	Flémåle						
Fleurus	Fleuru						
Flobecq		Flôbek		Vloesberg			
Floreffe	Florefe						
Florennes	Florêne						
Florenville	Floravile		Floravile				
Fontaine-l'Évêque	Fontinne-l'-Eveke						
Fosses-la-Ville	Fosse						
Frameries	Framriye						
Frasnes-lez-Anvaing		Fraine-dilé-Anvegn					
Froidchapelle		Fritchapelle					
Gedinne	Djedene						
Geer	Djer						
Gembloux	Djiblou			Gembloers			
Genappe	Djinape			Genepiën			
Gerpinnes	Djerpene						
Gesves	Djeve						
Gouvy	Gouvi					Geilich	Gäilech
Grâce-Hollogne	Gråce-Hologne						
Grez-Doiceau	Gré			Graven			
Habay			Habâ				
Hamoir	Hamwer						
Hamois	Hamwè						
Ham-sur-Heure-Nalinnes	Han-Nålene						
Hannut	Haneù			Hannuit			
Hastière	Astire						
Havelange	Havlondje						
Hélécine	Élessene			Heylissem			
Hensies		Inzî					
Herbeumont	Arbûmont						
Herstal	Hesta						
Herve	Heve				Herf		
Honnelles		Onele					
Hotton	Houton						
Houffalize	Oufalijhe						Haufelescht, Houfelescht
Huy	Hu			Hoei			
Incourt	Incoû						
Ittre	Ite			Itter			
Jalhay	Djalhé					Galbach	
Jemeppe-sur-Sambre	Djimepe-so-Sambe						
Jodoigne	Djodogne			Geldenaken			
Juprelle	Djouprele						
Jurbise		Djurbize		Jurbeke			
La Bruyère	Les Brouhires						
La Calamine				Kelmis			
La Hulpe	L' Elpe			Terhulpen			
La Louvière	El Lovire						
La Roche-en-Ardenne	Li Rotche						
Lasne	Lane						
Le Rœulx	El Rû						
Léglise	Leglijhe, Lèglije						
Les Bons Villers	Les Bons Viyés						
Lessines	Lissene	Lissene		Lessen			
Leuze-en-Hainaut	Leuze-e-Hinnot						
Libramont-Chevigny	Libråmont						
Lierneux	Lierneu						
Limbourg	Limbôr			Limburg		Limburg	
Lincent	Lîssin			Lijsem			
Lobbes	Lôbe						
Lontzen					Lontzen Loonze		
Liège	Lidje			Luik	Luuk, Luik	Lüttich	Léck
Malmedy	Måmdey					Malmünd	
Manage	Manadje						
Manhay	Manhé						
Marche-en-Famenne	Måtche-el-Fåmene						Mark
Marchin	Mårcin						
Martelange	Måtlindje					Martelingen	Maartel
Meix-devant-Virton	Méch-divant-Vierton		Minch-duvant-Vèrtan				
Merbes-le-Château	Mierbe						
Messancy	Messanceye					Metzig	Miezeg
Mettet	Metet, M'tet						
Modave	Modåve						
Momignies		Momgniye					
Mons	Mont	Mont		Bergen		Bergen	
Mont-de-l'Enclus				Kluisbergen			
Montigny-le-Tilleul	Mont' gnî						
Mont-Saint-Guibert	Mont-Sint-Gubiet						
Morlanwelz	Marlanwè						
Mouscron		Moucron		Moeskroen			
Namur	Nameur			Namen		Namür	
Neufchâteau	Li Tchestea					Neuenburg in Lützelburg	
Neupré	Li Noûpré						
Nivelles	Nivele			Nijvel			
Ohey	Ohè						
Olne	Ône						
Oreye				Oerle			
Orp-Jauche	Oû-Djåce						
Ottignies-Louvain-la-Neuve	Ocgniye-Li Noû Lovén			Nieuw-Leuven		Neu-Löwen	Nei-Léiwen
Ouffet	Oufet						
Oupeye	Oûpêye						
Paliseul	Palijhoû						
Pecq		Pècq					
Péruwelz		Piérwé					
Perwez	Perwé			Perwijs			
Philippeville	Flipveye						
Plombières				Blieberg	Blieberig, Plaobjaer	Bleyberg, Bleiberg	
Pont-à-Celles	Pont-a-Cele						
Profondeville	Parfondveye						
Quaregnon		Cwargnon					
Quévy	Kévi						
Quiévrain		Kievrin					
Raeren					Raore		
Ramillies	Ramiêye						
Rebecq	Ribek						
Remicourt	Remicoû						
Rendeux	Rindeu						
Rixensart	Ricsinsåt						
Rochefort	Rotchfoirt						
Rouvroy	Rovroe-e-Gåme						
Saint-Georges-sur-Meuse	Sint-Djôr-so-Mouze						
Saint-Ghislain		Sint-Guilin					
Saint-Hubert	Sint-Houbert						
Saint-Léger			Sint-Ldjir				
Saint-Nicolas	Sint-Nicolêye						
Sambreville	Sambveye						
St. Vith						Sankt Vith	Sankt Väit
Seneffe	Sinefe						
Seraing	Serè						
Silly	Ch'li			Opzullik			
Sivry-Rance		Chevri-Rance					
Soignies	Sougniye			Zinnik			
Sombreffe	Sombrefe						
Somme-Leuze	Some-Leuze						
Soumagne	Soûmagne						
Spa	Spå						
Stavelot	Ståvleu					Stablo	
Tellin	Telin						
Tenneville	Tiniveye						
Theux	Teu						
Thimister-Clermont	Timister-Clairmont						
Thuin	Twin						
Tintigny			Tintnî				
Tournai		Tornai		Doornik		Dornick	
Trois-Ponts	Troes Ponts					Dreibrücken	
Trooz	Li Trô						
Tubize				Tubeke			
Vaux-sur-Sûre	Li Vå-so-Seure						
Verlaine	Verlinne						
Verviers	Vervî					Velwisch	
Vielsalm	Li Viye Såm						
Villers-la-Ville	Viyé-l'-Veye						
Villers-le-Bouillet	Viyé-l'-Boulet						
Viroinval	Virwinvå						
Virton	Vierton		Viertan				
Visé	Vizé			Wezet		Weset	
Vresse-sur-Semois	Vresse						
Walcourt	Walcoû						
Walhain	Walin						
Wanze	Wônse						
Waremme	Wareme			Borgworm			
Wasseiges	Wazedje						
Waterloo	Waterlô						
Wavre	Wåve, Aufe			Waver			
Waimes	Waime						
Welkenraedt	Welkenrote			Welkenraad	Wellekete	Welkenraedt, Welkenrath	
Wellin	Welin						
Yvoir	Uwar						

== Brussels ==
Brussels-Capital Region
French	Dutch	German
Anderlecht		Anderlek
Bruxelles	Brussel	Brüssel
Ixelles	Elsene	
Forest	Vorst	
Auderghem	Oudergem	
Schaerbeek	Schaarbeek	
Berchem-Sainte-Agathe	Sint-Agatha-Berchem	
Saint-Gilles	Sint-Gillis	
Molenbeek-Saint-Jean	Sint-Jans-Molenbeek	
Saint-Josse-ten-Noode	Sint-Joost-ten-Node	
Woluwe-Saint-Lambert	Sint-Lambrechts-Woluwe	
Woluwe-Saint-Pierre	Sint-Pieters-Woluwe	
Uccle	Ukkel	
Watermael-Boitsfort	Watermaal-Bosvoorde	

== See also ==
- Names of Belarusian places in other languages
- Names of Lithuanian places in other languages
