= Bocq =

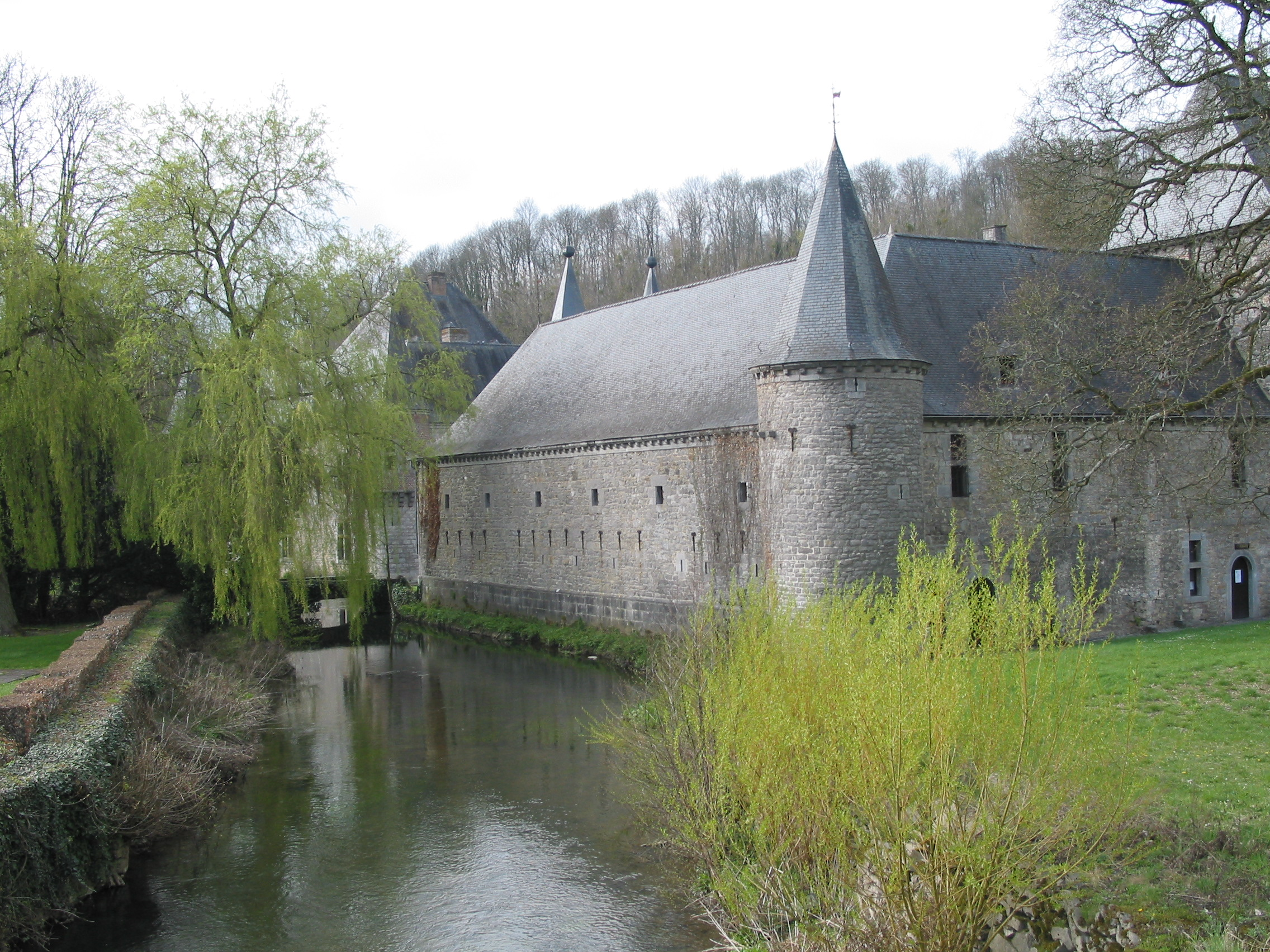
- The Bocq running along the castle of Spontin.

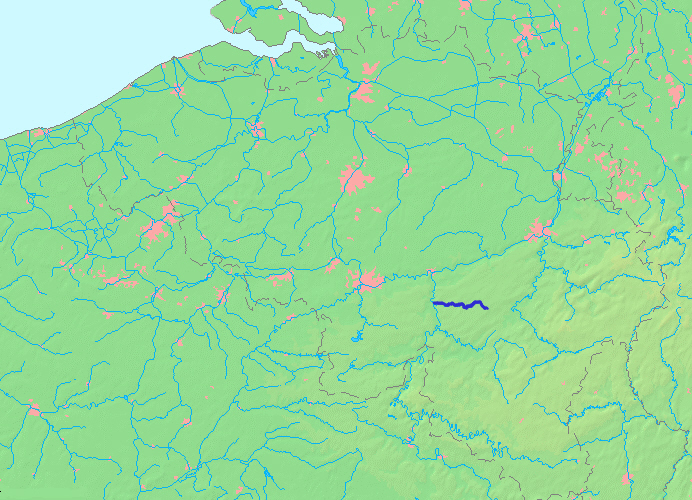

Location
- Country: Belgium
- Region: Wallonia

Physical characteristics
- Source
  - location: Scy
- Mouth: Meuse
  - location: Yvoir
  - coordinates: 50°19′28″N 4°52′34″E
- Length: 45 kilometres (28 mi)
- Basin size: 230 square kilometres (89 sq mi)
- Discharge
  - location: Yvoir
  - average: 2.21 cubic metres (78 cu ft) per second

Basin features
- Progression: Meuse→ North Sea
- Cities: Scy, Emptinne, Natoye, Braibant, Spontin, Yvoir
- Tributaries
  - left: Leignon
  - right: Crupet, Petit Bocq

The Bocq (French pronunciation: [bɔk]) is a river in Belgium, a right-bank tributary of the Meuse. The full length of the Bocq lies in the province of Namur.

== Geography ==
The Bocq rises in Scy, Condroz, at an altitude of 305 meters (1,001 ft). On its way it passes through the villages of Mohiville, Achet, Hamois, Emptinne, Sovet, Braibant and Spontin. From this village, the valley gets woodier. In Bauche, it receives the waters of its main tributary, the Crupet. After 45 kilometres (28 mi), the Bocq empties into the right bank of the Meuse in Yvoir, at an altitude of 90 meters (300 ft). Its average slope is 0.48% and the surface area of its basin is 230 square kilometres (89 sq mi).

== Communes crossed by the Bocq ==
- Hamois (from Scy to Emptinne and near Natoye).
- Ciney (near Braibant).
- Yvoir (from Spontin to the center of Yvoir where it flows into the Meuse).

== Tributaries ==
- The Crupet (right bank)
- The Leignon (left bank)
- The Petit Bocq (right bank)
- The Potriat (left bank)

== Economy ==
- 2 stone quarries are still in use between Spontin and Yvoir. There were several dozen of them, which is why the railway line was built.
- On the banks of its lower part, the Bocq had several mills used to grind grain or, in the hamlet of Chansin, to generate the electricity needed to crush limestone.
- On the territories of Spontin, Dorinne and Crupet, the water of a few sources in the Bocq valley is collected by Vivaqua, the former Compagnie Intercommunale Bruxelloise des Eaux (CIBE) at a rate of 34.000 cubic metres (1,200.7 cu ft) to 55.000 cubic metres (1,942.3 cu ft) per day. It supplies about 15% of the Brussels drinking water distribution network.
- In Spontin, the water of three sources had been collected by the Spadel company since 1922 and bottled on site. It was also used for lemonade production. In August 2011 Mecca Cola developed a plan to exploit the Spontin sources, but abandoned it in 2012.
- The Bocq gave its name to the Brasserie du Bocq in Purnode.
- Railway line 128 follows the Bocq from Braibant to Yvoir and is operated as a tourist line by the Chemin de fer du Bocq.

== Flow ==
The discharge of the river measured at Yvoir (230 square kilometres (89 sq mi) basin) between 1980 and 2003 was 2.21 cubic metres (78 cu ft) per second. Measurements during the same period show:

- An average of 3.57 cubic metres (126 cu ft) per second in 1981, the maximum average annual flow over the period.
- A minimum average annual flow of 1.0 cubic metre (35 cu ft) per second in 1996.

== See also ==
- List of rivers of Belgium
