= List of protected heritage sites in Chastre =

This table shows an overview of the protected heritage sites in the Walloon town Chastre. This list is part of Belgium's national heritage.

Object	Year/architect	Town/section	Address	Coordinates	Number^{?}	Image
Farm located at Rue de la Station # 43 (M) and its surroundings (S) ^{(nl)} ^{(fr)}		Chastre	Rue de la Station nr. 43	50.610834°N 4.644301°E	25117-CLT-0001-01 Info	Boerderij gelegen aan de Rue de la Station nr. 43 (M) en zijn omgeving (S)
Tumuli of Noirmont, two graves and their surroundings ^{(nl)} ^{(fr)}		Chastre		50.602089°N 4.643188°E	25117-CLT-0002-01 Info	Tumuli van Noirmont, twee graven en hun omgeving
The facades and the entire roof of the farmhouse "La Grande Bierwart" located at No. 32 ^{(nl)} ^{(fr)}		Chastre	rue de Mellery	50.583834°N 4.600926°E	25117-CLT-0003-01 Info	
The archaeological site tumuli of Noirmont in "Champ des Tombes" ^{(nl)} ^{(fr)}		Chastre		50.601170°N 4.639492°E	25117-PEX-0001-01 Info	De archeologische site Tumuli van Noirmont op het gebied "Champ des Tombes"

== See also ==
- Lists of protected heritage sites in Walloon Brabant
- Chastre
