= Villers-sur-Semois Castle =

Castle in Belgium

- Étalle, Wallonia, Belgium

Site information
- Type: Castle

Villers-sur-Semois Castle is a castle in Villers-sur-Semois in the municipality of Étalle in the province of Luxembourg, Wallonia, Belgium.

== History ==
It originally was the château of blacksmith Henri Henriquet, who became lord of the village in 1709. In 1712, he obtained permission to divert the Semois for drainage purposes, at which point he built a castle which remained his residence until 1730. Built in a quadrangular shape, it is flanked by a 10-meter-high octagonal tower and included a castle chapel where services could be held. It was in this chapel that Henri Henriquet's sisters-in-law were married. To the west, the castle had agricultural outbuildings, constructed later, around the mid-19th century. These were used by farmers from Villers-sur-Semois until the 2000s.

The castle is undergoing restoration, but due to disagreements, the restoration is currently (2023) on hold.

== See also ==
- List of castles and châteaux in Belgium
