= Lescheret =

Village in Belgium

- Village
- Location in Belgium
- Coordinates: 49.8766995°N 5.5683°E
- Country: Belgium
- Region: Wallonia
- Province: Luxembourg
- Municipality: Vaux-sur-Sûre
- Time zone: CET

Lescheret is a village in the Belgian province of Luxembourg. It is located in Juseret, a borough of Vaux-sur-Sûre. The village center is located over a kilometer east of the village center of Juseret.

== Location ==
This Ardennes village is situated in the southern part of the new municipality of Vaux-sur-Sûre, between the localities of Juseret and Chêne, the latter village belonging to the municipality of Léglise. It is located at the source of the small Lescheret stream, a tributary of the Géronne. The valley of this stream is considered a site of great biological interest.

== Heritage ==
- The Saint-Roch Chapel was constructed around 1880 in a neo-Romanesque style. It replaced the earlier church built in 1664 when the inhabitants of the village of Mageriol, decimated by the plague, set fire to the village and settled on the other side of the hill at Lescheret. Some of the furniture (including a reredos with niches and angelic heads) dates back to the time of this first building and comes from the old church of Mageriol. Unfortunately, ancient statues of Saint Roch and Saint Sebastian from that time were stolen at the end of the 20th century. The chapel has a single nave with three bays and a semi-circular apse. The facade, tower, and roof are covered with slate, and the spire has an octagonal shape with a square base.
- Two other small chapels are listed in the village.

== Tourism ==
- Lescheret has a small campsite and a singing restaurant.

== Notable Personality from the Village ==
Arnaud De Lie, a cyclist born in 2002, lives in a farm in the village. He is nicknamed the "Bull of Lescheret".
