= List of protected heritage sites in Étalle, Belgium =

This table shows an overview of the protected heritage sites in the Walloon town Étalle, Belgium. This list is part of Belgium's national heritage.

Object	Year/architect	Town/section	Address	Coordinates	Number^{?}	Image
Ancient fortified ruins of the refuge and covered halls of the old ironworks from the 17th century and the ensemble of the listed buildings and the immediate vicinity of the former Roman camp ^{(nl)} ^{(fr)}		Étalle		49.630729°N 5.594953°E	85009-CLT-0001-01 Info	Oude versterkte uitwijkplaats en ruïnes van de overdekte hallen van de oude smederijen uit de 17e eeuw en het ensemble van de genoemde gebouwen en de directe omgeving van het voormalige Romeinse kamp
St. Martin's Church ^{(nl)} ^{(fr)}		Étalle		49.699785°N 5.561089°E	85009-CLT-0002-01 Info	Kerk Saint-Martin
Washing place near the church Saint-Martin ^{(nl)} ^{(fr)}		Étalle	rue Saint-Martin	49.699717°N 5.560804°E	85009-CLT-0003-01 Info	
pump ^{(nl)} ^{(fr)}		Étalle	rue du Marais	49.671532°N 5.564859°E	85009-CLT-0004-01 Info	
pump ^{(nl)} ^{(fr)}		Étalle	Place Communale, Etalle	49.673784°N 5.563959°E	85009-CLT-0005-01 Info	
pump ^{(nl)} ^{(fr)}		Étalle	chaussée Romaine	49.669677°N 5.563839°E	85009-CLT-0006-01 Info	
Washing place ^{(nl)} ^{(fr)}		Étalle	route de Mortinsart	49.704218°N 5.585335°E	85009-CLT-0007-01 Info	
Linden tree near the church ^{(nl)} ^{(fr)}		Étalle	place Saint-Michel	49.653157°N 5.651151°E	85009-CLT-0008-01 Info	Linde nabij de kerk More images
Avenue with 36 lime trees at the exit of Chantemelle ^{(nl)} ^{(fr)}		Étalle		49.649811°N 5.651409°E	85009-CLT-0009-01 Info	Laan met 36 lindebomen bij de uitgang van Chantemelle
The heraldic shield with the coat of arms of Semois ^{(nl)} ^{(fr)}		Étalle		49.687928°N 5.551508°E	85009-CLT-0010-01 Info	
Marsh called "du Landbrough" and environment ^{(nl)} ^{(fr)}		Étalle		49.654740°N 5.683657°E	85009-CLT-0011-01 Info	
Ensemble of the archaeological site of the old ironworks of Buzenol ^{(nl)} ^{(fr)}		Étalle		49.630322°N 5.591735°E	85009-PEX-0001-01 Info	Ensemble van de archeologische site van Buzenol waaronder de oude ijzergieterij More images
Marsh called "du Landbrough" ^{(nl)} ^{(fr)}		Étalle		49.654740°N 5.683657°E	85009-PEX-0002-01 Info	

== See also ==
- List of protected heritage sites in Luxembourg (Belgium)
- Étalle, Belgium
