= List of protected heritage sites in Hamois =

This table shows an overview of the protected heritage sites in the Walloon town Hamois. This list is part of Belgium's national heritage.

| Object | Year/architect | Town/section | Address | Coordinates | Number^{?} | Image |
|---|---|---|---|---|---|---|
| Chapel of Sainte-Agathe ^{(nl)} ^{(fr)} | | Hamois | Hubinne | 50.341345°N 5.159802°E | 91059-CLT-0001-01 Info | Kapel Sainte-Agathe |
| Farm: facades and roofs of all buildings, and the wall of the old cemetery, ensemble of the chapel of Sainte-Agathe, all farm buildings and old cemetery wall and surrounding area ^{(nl)} ^{(fr)} | | Hamois | rue de Hubinne 10-12, Hubinne | 50.341410°N 5.159693°E | 91059-CLT-0002-01 Info | Boerderij: gevels en daken van alle gebouwen, en de muur van de oude begraafplaats, ensemble van de kapel Sainte-Agathe, alle boerderijgebouwen en muur oude begraafplaats en omliggend terrein |
| Farm: facades, roofs and carpentry, except southeastern extension ^{(nl)} ^{(fr)} | | Hamois | route de Skeuvre n°2 | 50.338265°N 5.070210°E | 91059-CLT-0004-01 Info | Boerderij: gevels, daken en timmerwerk, uitgezonderd zuidoostelijke aanbouw |
| The dismantled organs of the church of Saint-Pierre ^{(nl)} ^{(fr)} | | Hamois | | 50.319650°N 5.190833°E | 91059-CLT-0005-02 Info | |

== See also ==
- List of protected heritage sites in Namur (province)
