= List of protected heritage sites in Bertogne =

This table shows an overview of the protected heritage sites in the Walloon town Bertogne. This list is part of Belgium's national heritage.

Object	Year/architect	Town/section	Address	Coordinates	Number^{?}	Image
Rolley Castle and the ruins, and the ensemble of the castle and surrounding areas ^{(nl)} ^{(fr)}		Bertogne		50.037874°N 5.682415°E	82005-CLT-0001-01 Info	
Castle Roumont called Relay Casaquy, the courtyard surrounded by stables, kennels and the ensemble formed by the castle and surrounding grounds ^{(nl)} ^{(fr)}		Bertogne	Flamierge	50.071029°N 5.558720°E	82005-CLT-0002-01 Info	
Chapel Sainte-Aldegonde de Flamisoulle, the wall of the cemetery, the headstones and crosses and the ensemble of the building and the cemetery ^{(nl)} ^{(fr)}		Bertogne		50.032048°N 5.629699°E	82005-CLT-0003-01 Info	Kapel Sainte-Aldegonde de Flamisoulle, de muur van het kerkhof, de grafstenen en kruisen en het ensemble van het gebouw en de begraafplaats More images
Old farm called "Rosiere" (walls, cladding and roofing, but also in the house) and establishment of a protection zone ^{(nl)} ^{(fr)}		Bertogne	Champ n° 793	50.039372°N 5.670315°E	82005-CLT-0004-01 Info	

== See also ==
- List of protected heritage sites in Luxembourg (Belgium)
