= Tintange =

Village and municipal district in Luxembourg, Belgium

Coordinates: 49.8788°N 5.7515°E

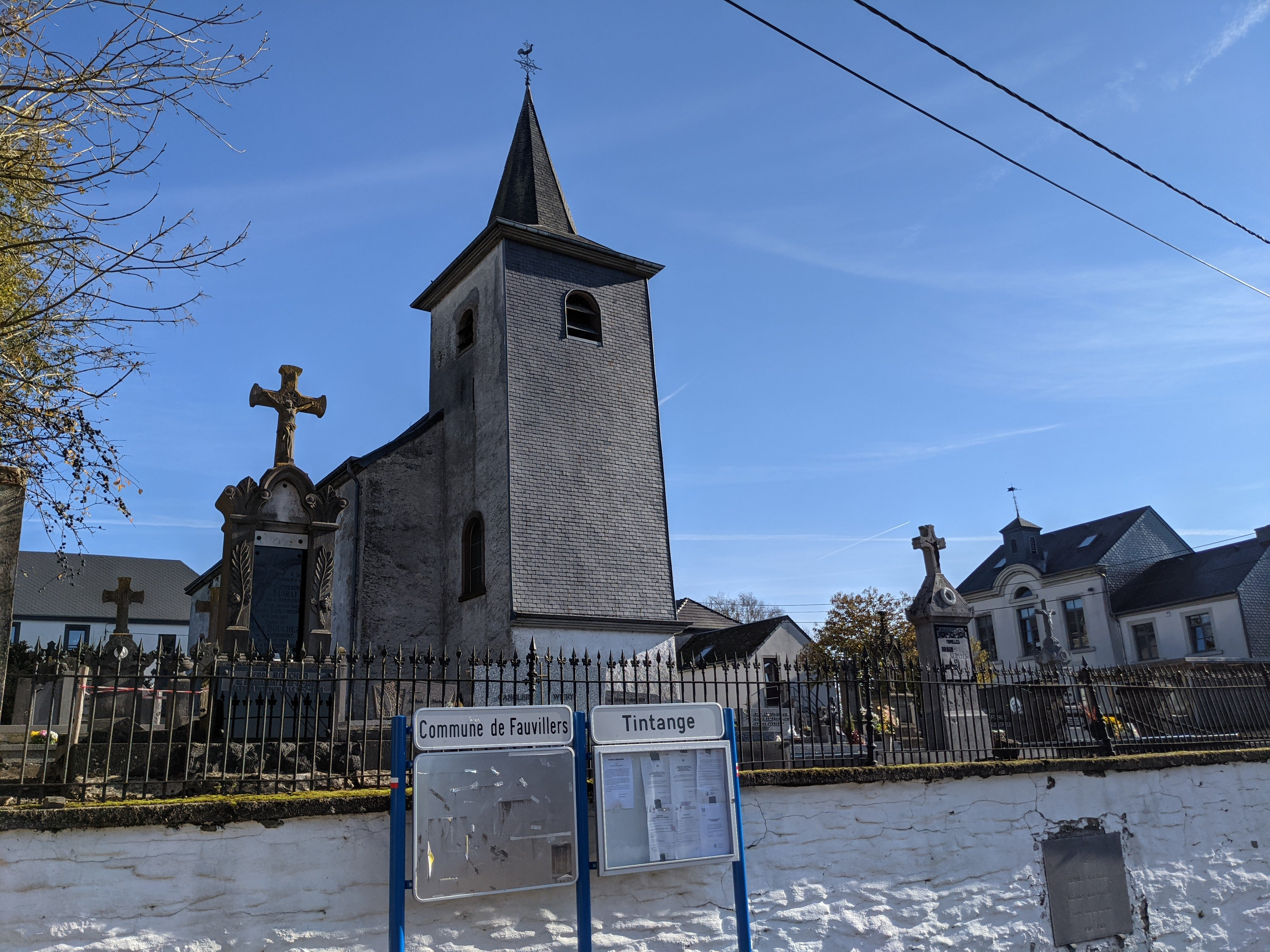
Church of Tintange

Tintange (French pronunciation: [tɛ̃tɑ̃ʒ]; German: Tintingen; Luxembourgish: Tënnen; Walloon: Tîtindje pronounced [tiː.'tɛ̃ʧ]) is a village of Wallonia and a district of the municipality of Fauvillers, located in the province of Luxembourg, Belgium. It is part of the Arelerland.

Tintange is situated close to the national road N4, between the towns of Bastogne and Martelange, and is surrounded by the valleys of a river and two creeks, respectively called Sûre, Surbach and Molscht.
