= European route E411 =

Road in trans-European E-road network

E411

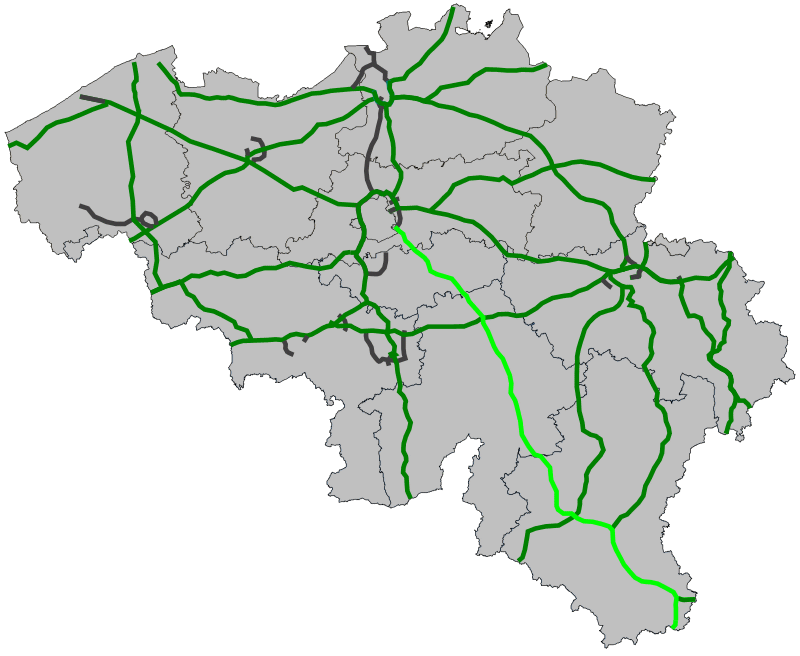
- European routes in Belgium with E411 in bright green (not shown: continues 71 km through France)

Route information
- Length: 271 km (168 mi)

Major junctions
- From: Brussels (Belgium)
- Wavre, Ottignies-Louvain-la-Neuve, Namur, Arlon (Belgium), Longwy (France), Hayange
- To: Metz (France)

Location
- Countries: Belgium; France

Highway system
- International E-road network; A Class; B Class

European route E411 is a European route in Belgium and France connecting Brussels to Metz via Namur and Arlon. The E411 starts in the municipality of Auderghem alongside the Beaulieu metro station, crosses the municipality on a viaduct, then crosses the Brussels Ring and leaves Auderghem to enter Flanders in Overijse. When it leaves Overijse, the route enters Wallonia in Rixensart. It has an interchange with European route E42 near Namur and with European route E25 near Neufchâteau. At this point and up to Arlon, the two routes use the same road. In Arlon, route E411 continues to Aubange in Belgium, Longwy in France and on to Metz where it connects to the A31-E25 near Uckange.

In Belgium, the route E411 has the national designation A4 and name l'Autoroute des Ardennes and is roughly parallel to the N4 road.

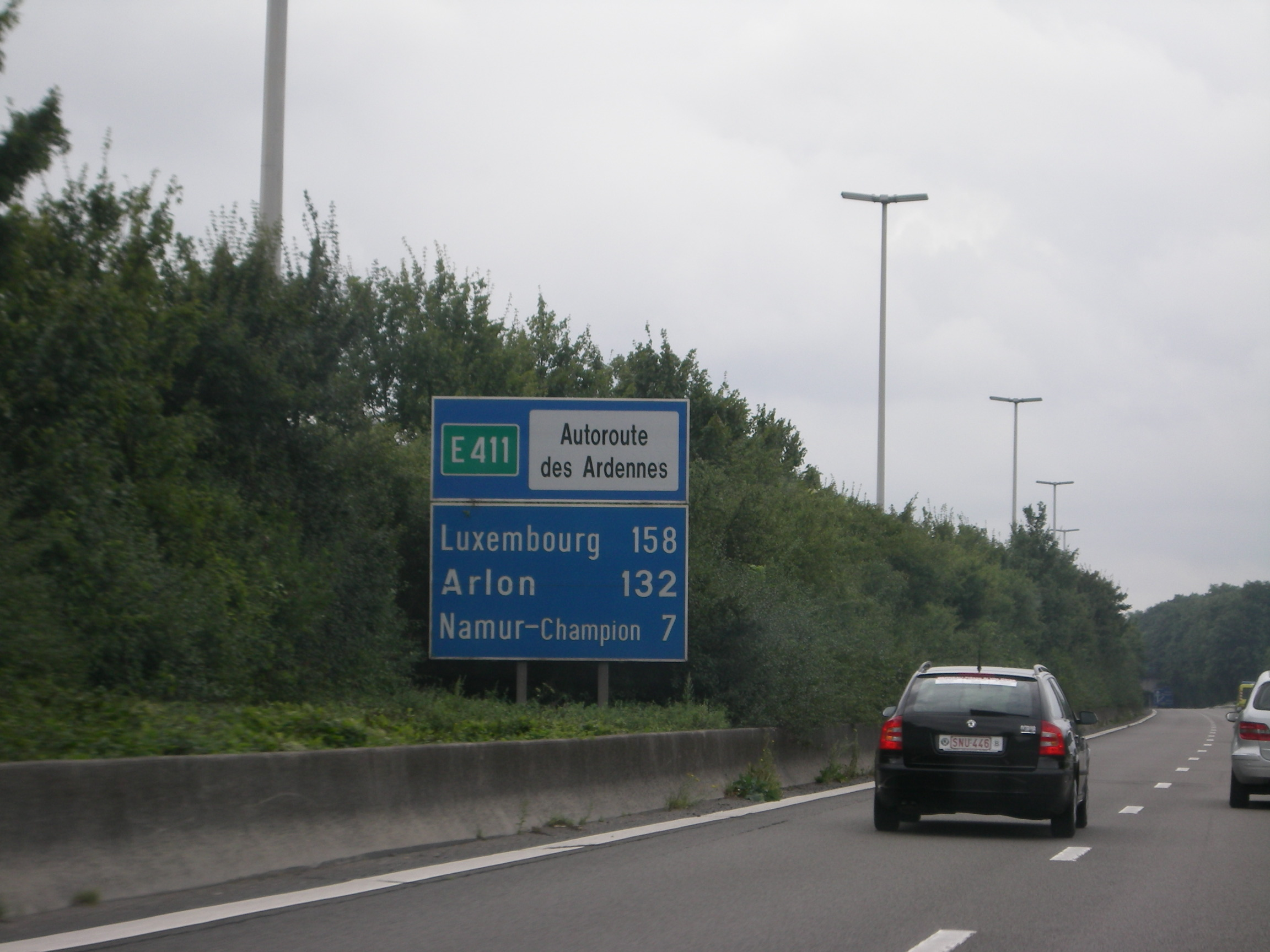
Sign showing route number and name, near Namur
