= List of protected heritage sites in Léglise =

This table shows an overview of the protected heritage sites in the Walloon town Léglise. This list is part of Belgium's national heritage.

Object	Year/architect	Town/section	Address	Coordinates	Number^{?}	Image
Ensemble of the church Saints-Pierre-et-Paul, the cemetery and the hill "Haut de la Cour" ^{(nl)} ^{(fr)}		Léglise		49.768322°N 5.516749°E	84033-CLT-0001-01 Info	
Upper Forge: bridge-dam, all the old buildings, lime kilns and the ruins of the old forges and the group formed by forging and surrounding areas ^{(nl)} ^{(fr)}		Léglise		49.752395°N 5.522672°E	84033-CLT-0003-01 Info	
Valley of the Geronne ^{(nl)} ^{(fr)}		Léglise		49.875640°N 5.590230°E	84033-CLT-0004-01 Info	
Ensemble of the former ironworks and surrounding areas ^{(nl)} ^{(fr)}		Léglise		49.761170°N 5.521155°E	84033-PEX-0001-01 Info	

== See also ==
- List of protected heritage sites in Luxembourg (Belgium)
- Léglise
