= Bertogne =

Town in Wallonia, Belgium

Bertogne Biertogne (Walloon)
- Town
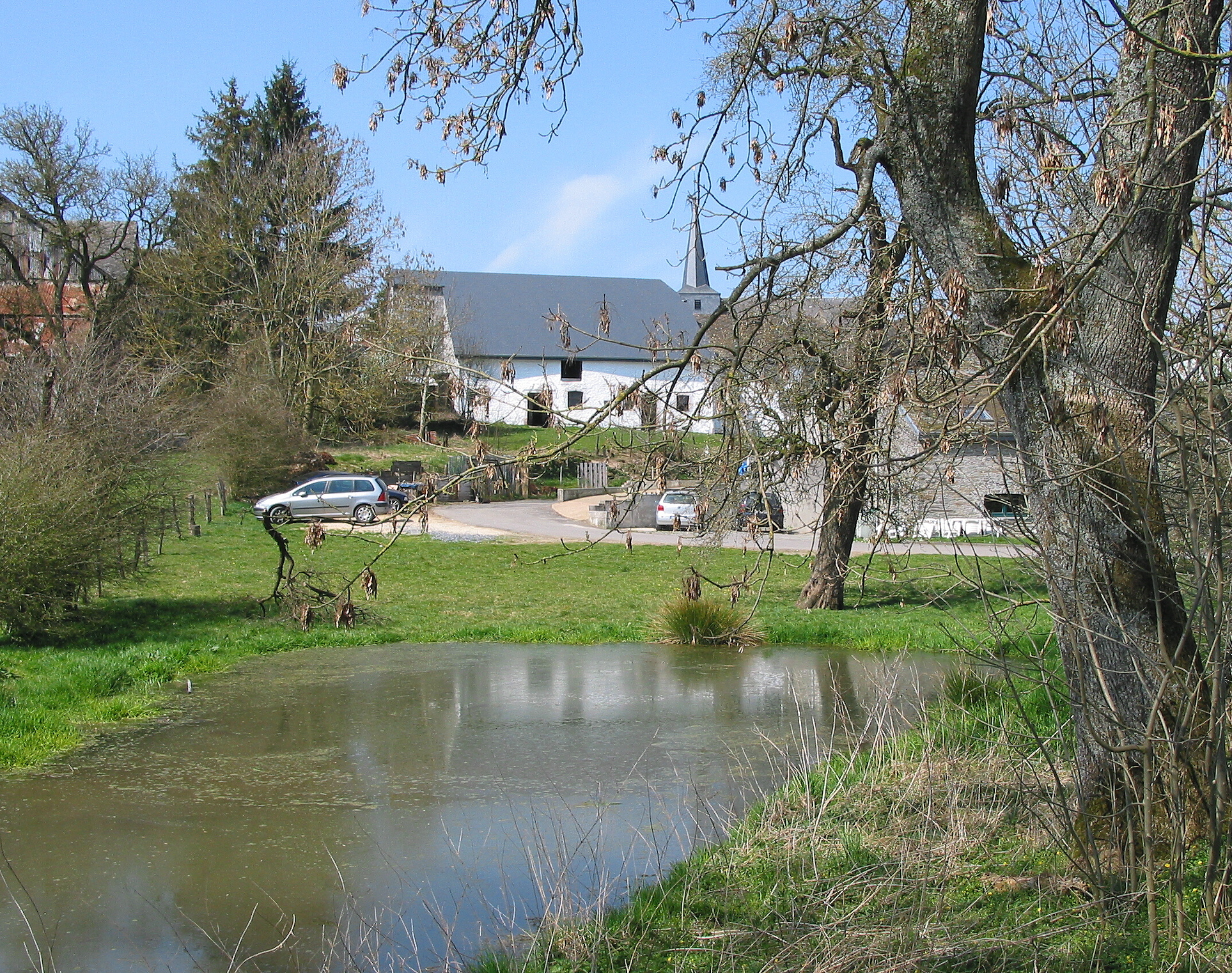
- The St Lambert's church area of Bertogne

- Flag Coat of arms
- Interactive map of Bertogne
- Location within Belgium Location within Luxembourg (Belgium)
- Coordinates: 50°05′N 05°40′E
- Country: Belgium
- Community: French Community
- Region: Wallonia
- Province: Luxembourg
- Arrondissement: Bastogne
- Municipality: Bastogne

Area
  - Total: 91.66 km^{2} (35.39 sq mi)

Population (2024-01-01)
  - Total: 3,767
  - Density: 41.10/km^{2} (106.4/sq mi)
- Postal codes: 6686-6688
- Area codes: 061

Bertogne (French pronunciation: [bɛʁtɔɲ]; Walloon: Biertogne) is a town in the municipality of Bastogne in Wallonia and a former municipality located in the Belgian province of Luxembourg. It was a separate municipality until December 2024. On 2 December 2024, it merged with Bastogne into a new municipality.

On 1 January 2024 the municipality, which covers 91.66 km², had 3,767 inhabitants, giving a population density of 41.10 inhabitants per km².

The former municipality consists of the following districts: Bertogne, Flamierge, and Longchamps.

Other population centers include:

- Bethomont
- Compogne
- Berhain
- Frenet
- Gives
- Givroulle
- Givry
- Roumont
- Salle
- Troismont
- Tronle
- Wigny
- Champs
- Fays
- Flamisoul
- Mande-Saint-Étienne
- Monaville
- Rolley
- Rouette
- Withimont

== See also ==
- List of protected heritage sites in Bertogne
