= List of protected heritage sites in Vaux-sur-Sûre =

This table shows an overview of the protected heritage sites in the Walloon town Vaux-sur-Sûre. This list is part of Belgium's national heritage.

Object	Year/architect	Town/section	Address	Coordinates	Number^{?}	Image
Old cemetery of Sibret ^{(nl)} ^{(fr)}		Vaux-sur-Sûre	rue du Centre	49.972205°N 5.634827°E	82036-CLT-0001-01 Info	Oude begraafplaats van Sibret
Chapel Villeroux in its entirety, with the wall of the cemetery and the headstones and crosses and the ensemble formed by the chapel and cemetery ^{(nl)} ^{(fr)}		Vaux-sur-Sûre		49.979128°N 5.653831°E	82036-CLT-0002-01 Info	Kapel Villeroux in zijn geheel, met de muur van het kerkhof en de grafstenen en kruisen en het ensemble gevormd door de kapel en kerkhof
Monceau (facades and roofs) and the ensemble of the farm and surrounding area ^{(nl)} ^{(fr)}		Vaux-sur-Sûre		49.881331°N 5.552136°E	82036-CLT-0003-01 Info	
Caves discovered under the former wing of the Château-Ferme du Monceau ^{(nl)} ^{(fr)}		Vaux-sur-Sûre		49.881114°N 5.552247°E	82036-CLT-0004-01 Info	

== See also ==
- List of protected heritage sites in Luxembourg (Belgium)
- Vaux-sur-Sûre
