= Arrondissement of Bastogne =

Arrondissement in Wallonia, Belgium

Arrondissement of Bastogne Arrondissement de Bastogne
- Arrondissement
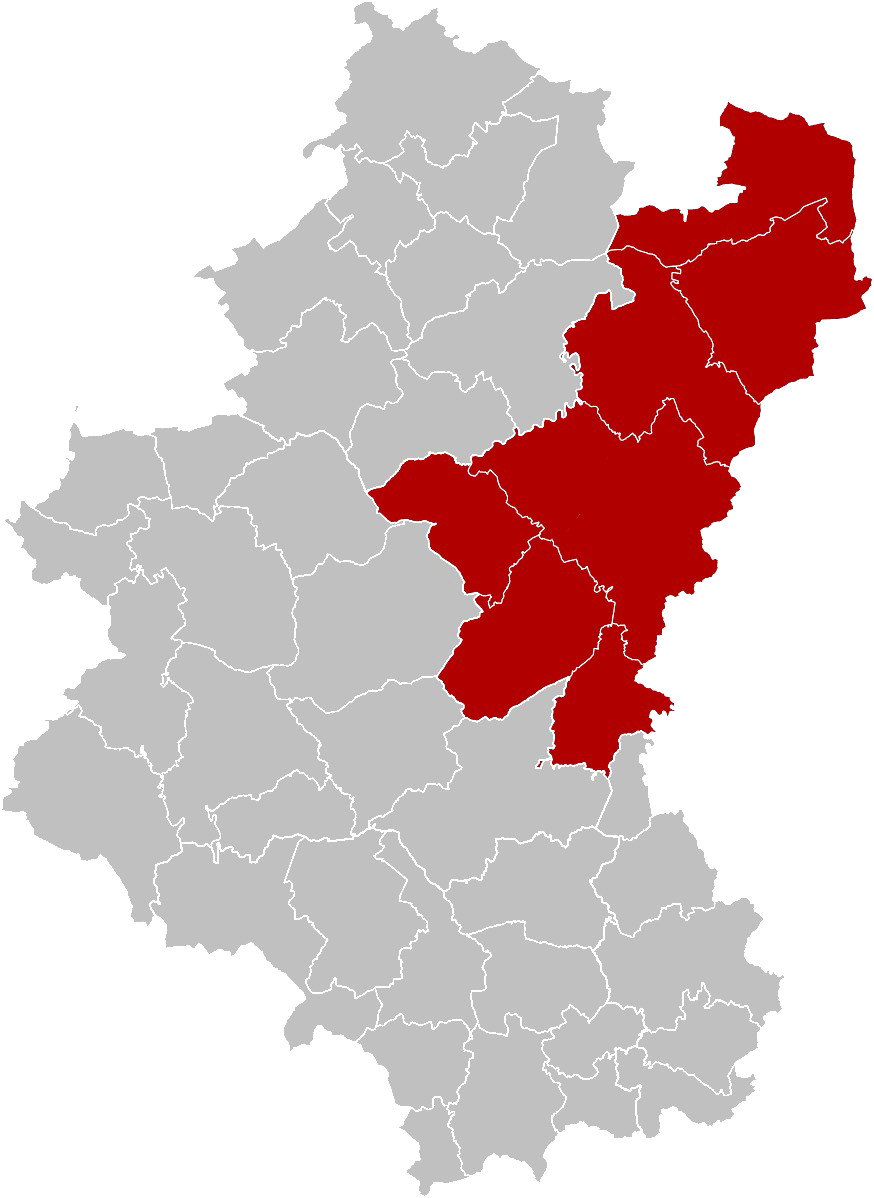
- Location of the arrondissement in Luxembourg
- Coordinates: 50.0°N 5.7°E
- Country: Belgium
- Region: Wallonia
- Province: Luxembourg
- Municipalities: 7

Area
  - Total: 1,043.00 km^{2} (402.70 sq mi)

Population (1 January 2017)
  - Total: 47,844
  - Density: 45.872/km^{2} (118.81/sq mi)
- Time zone: UTC+1 (CET)
  - Summer (DST): UTC+2 (CEST)

The Arrondissement of Bastogne (French: Arrondissement de Bastogne; Dutch: Arrondissement Bastenaken; German: Bezirk Bastogne) is one of the five administrative arrondissements in the Walloon province of Luxembourg, Belgium. It is not a judicial arrondissement. Three of its municipalities, Gouvy, Houffalize and Vielsalm, are part of the Judicial Arrondissement of Marche-en-Famenne, while the rest of its municipalities are part of the Judicial Arrondissement of Neufchâteau.

== Municipalities ==
The Administrative Arrondissement of Bastogne consists of the following municipalities:

- Bastogne
- Fauvillers
- Gouvy
- Houffalize
- Sainte-Ode
- Vaux-sur-Sûre
- Vielsalm
