= Lavacherie =

Lavacherie Li Vatchreye (Walloon)
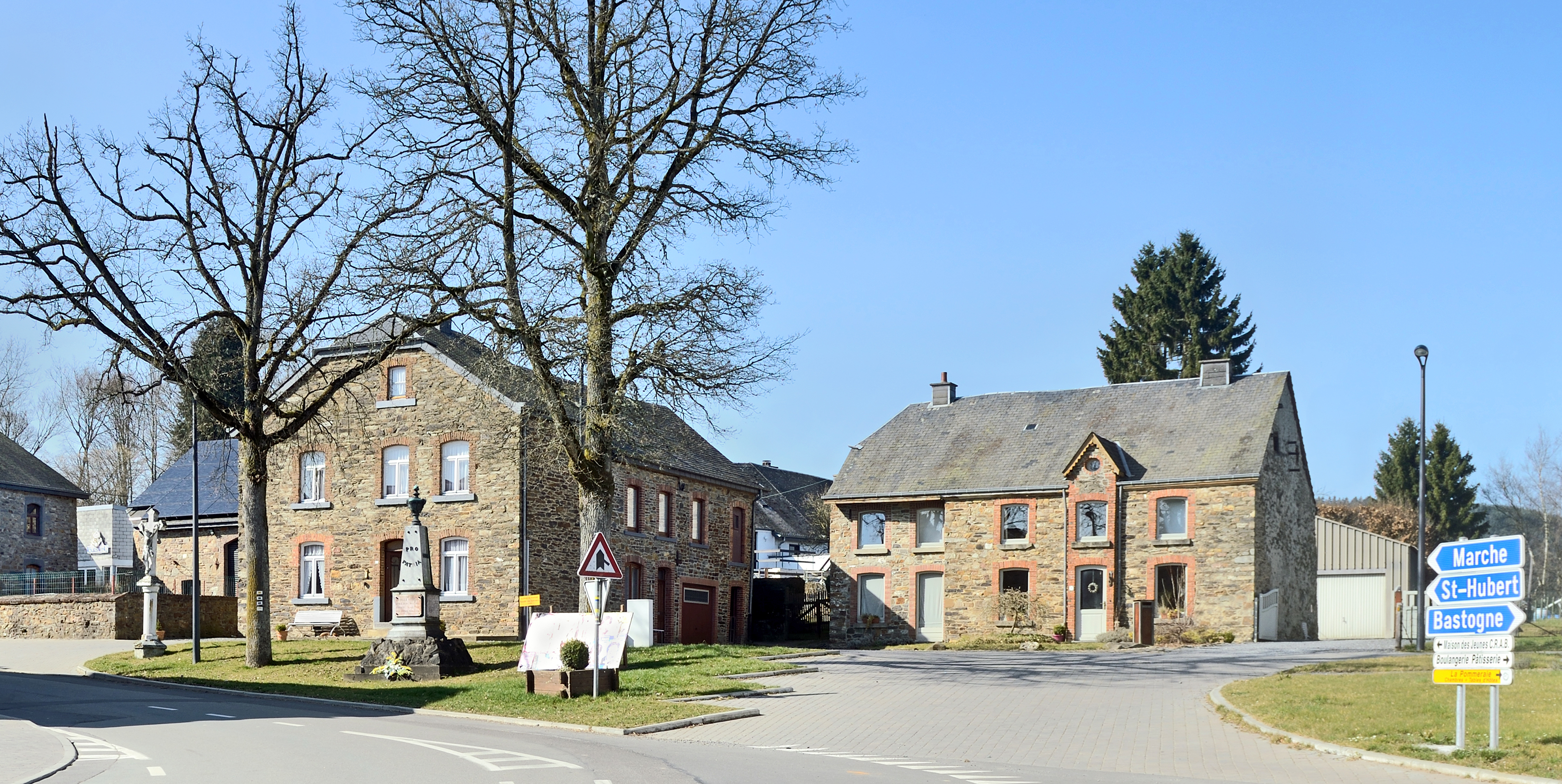
- Lavacherie

- Location within Belgium Location within Europe
- Coordinates: 50°03′14″N 05°30′39″E
- Country: Belgium
- Region: Wallonia
- Province: Luxembourg
- Municipality: Sainte-Ode

Lavacherie (French pronunciation: [lavaʃʁi]; Walloon: Li Vatchreye) is a village of Wallonia and a district of the municipality of Sainte-Ode, located in the province of Luxembourg, Belgium.

The village was historically subjected to the lords of La Roche-en-Ardenne. In 1814, the village was occupied by Cossacks and Prussian troops during the Napoleonic Wars. The village church contains stained glass windows of unusual quality.
