= Mohiville =

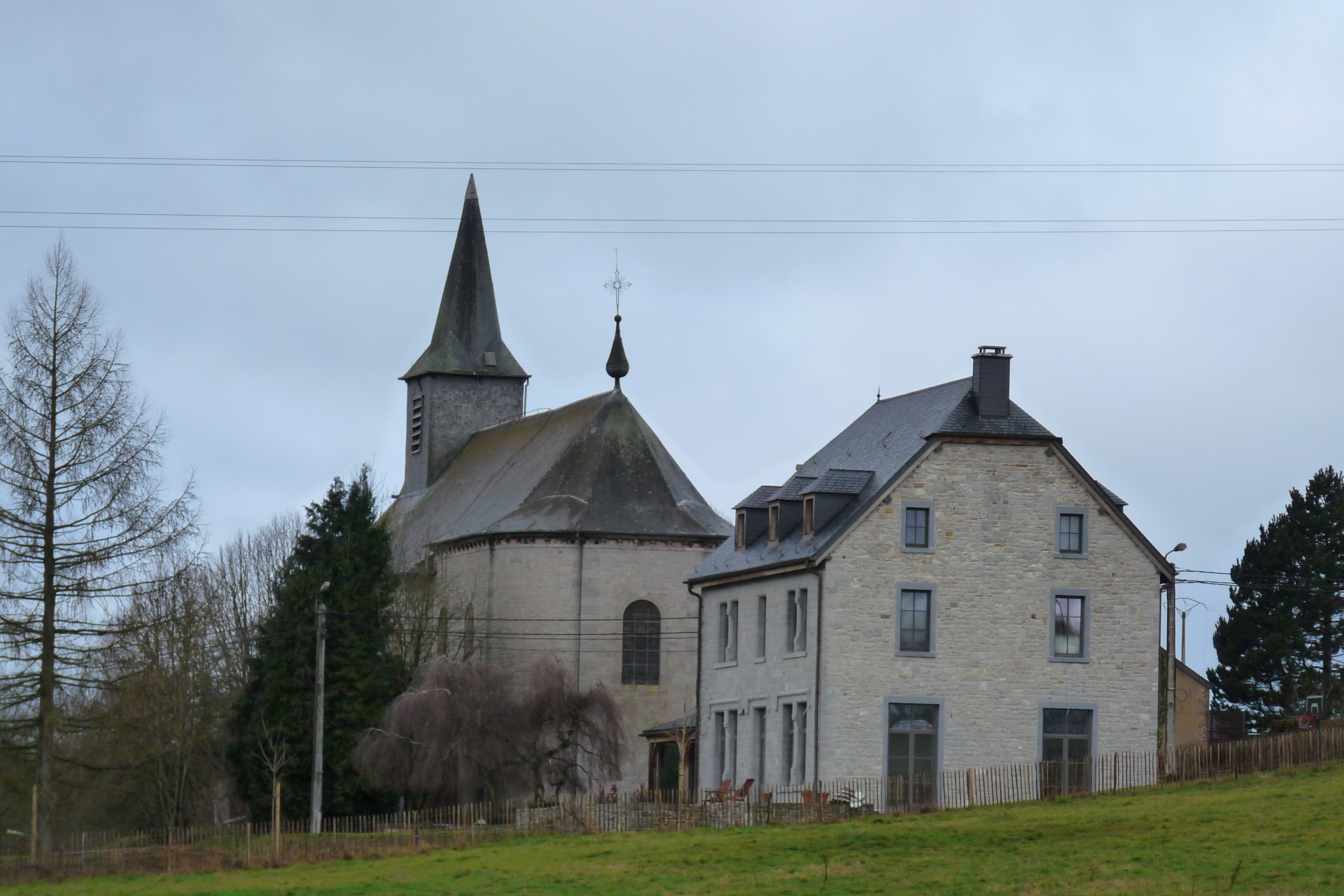
- Mohiville

- Location within Belgium Location within Europe
- Coordinates: 50°19′10″N 05°11′26″E
- Country: Belgium
- Region: Wallonia
- Province: Namur
- Municipality: Hamois

Mohiville (French pronunciation: [mɔivil]) is a village and a district in the municipality of Hamois, located in the province of Namur, Belgium.

Prehistoric archaeological remains have been discovered in the area, and a permanent settlement appears to have existed near Mohiville since Merovingian times. During the Middle Ages, the area of the current district was split between several lords. A water mill has existed here since at least 1231; the current mill building bears the date 1743. The current village church dates from 1768. There is also a small, 17th-century château close to Mohiville, the Château de Ry.
