= Sainte-Ode =

Municipality in Wallonia, Belgium

Sainte-Ode: Sinte-Oude (Walloon)
- Municipality
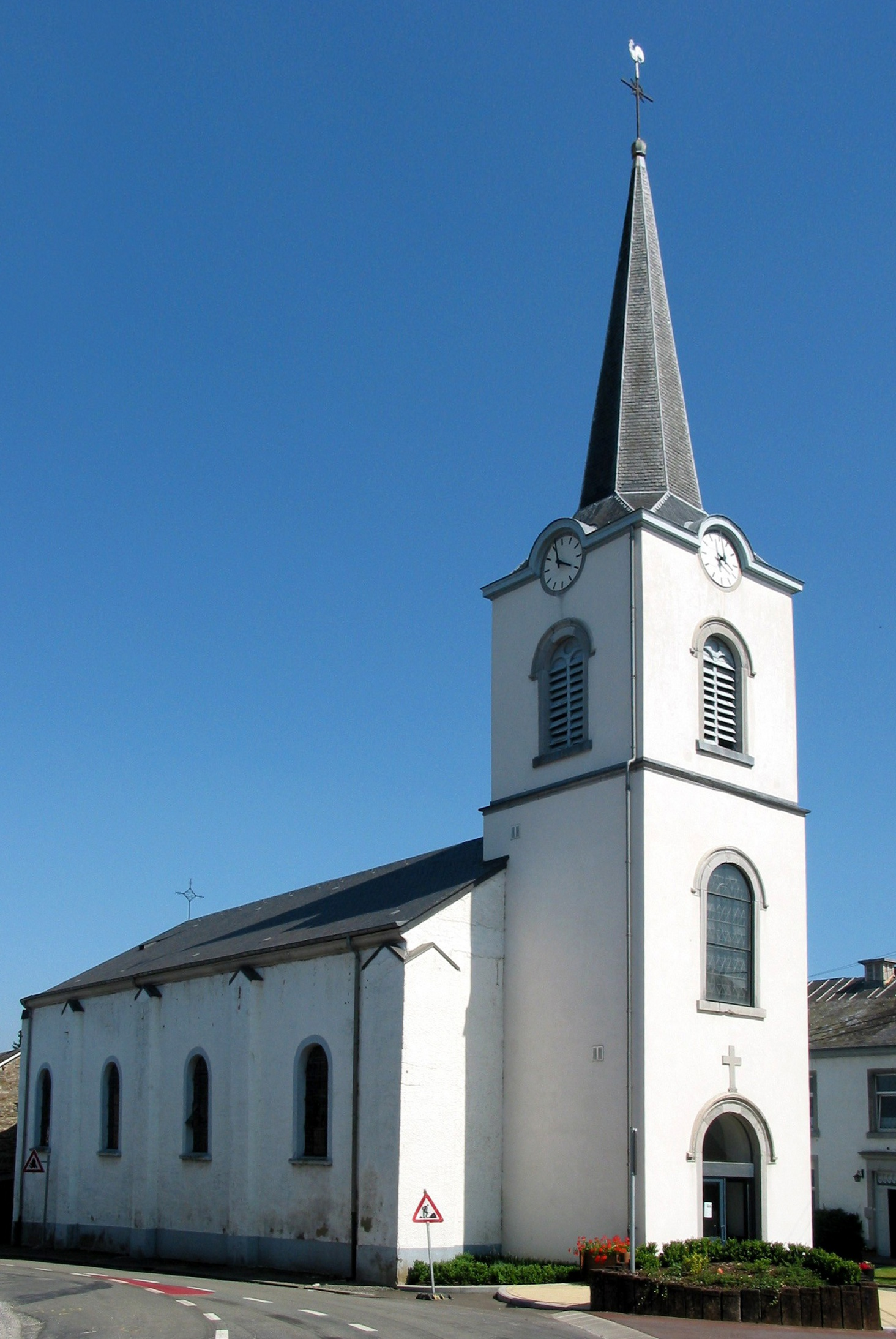
- Church in Lavacherie, Sainte-Ode

- Flag

- Location of Sainte-Ode in Luxembourg province
- Interactive map of Sainte-Ode
- Location in Belgium
- Coordinates: 50°02′N 05°32′E
- Country: Belgium
- Community: French Community
- Region: Wallonia
- Province: Luxembourg
- Arrondissement: Bastogne

Government
  - Mayor: Pierre PIRARD
  - Governing party: MR

Area
  - Total: 97.94 km^{2} (37.81 sq mi)

Population (2018-01-01)
  - Total: 2,557
  - Density: 26.11/km^{2} (67.62/sq mi)
- Postal codes: 6680-6681
- NIS code: 82038
- Area codes: 061
- Website: sainte-ode.be

Sainte-Ode (French pronunciation: [sɛ̃t ɔd]; Walloon: Sinte-Oude) is a municipality of Wallonia located in the province of Luxembourg, Belgium.

On 1 January 2007, the municipality, which covers 97.87 km^{2}, had 2,305 inhabitants, giving a population density of 23.6 inhabitants per km^{2}.

The municipality consists of the following districts: Amberloup (town centre), Lavacherie, and Tillet. Other population centers include:

- Acul
- Aviscourt
- Beauplateau
- Chisogne
- Fosset
- Gérimont
- Herbaimont
- Houmont
- Hubermont
- Laval
- Le Jardin
- Magerotte
- Magery
- Ménil
- Pinsamont
- Rechrival
- Renuamont
- Sprimont
- Tonny
