= Scy =

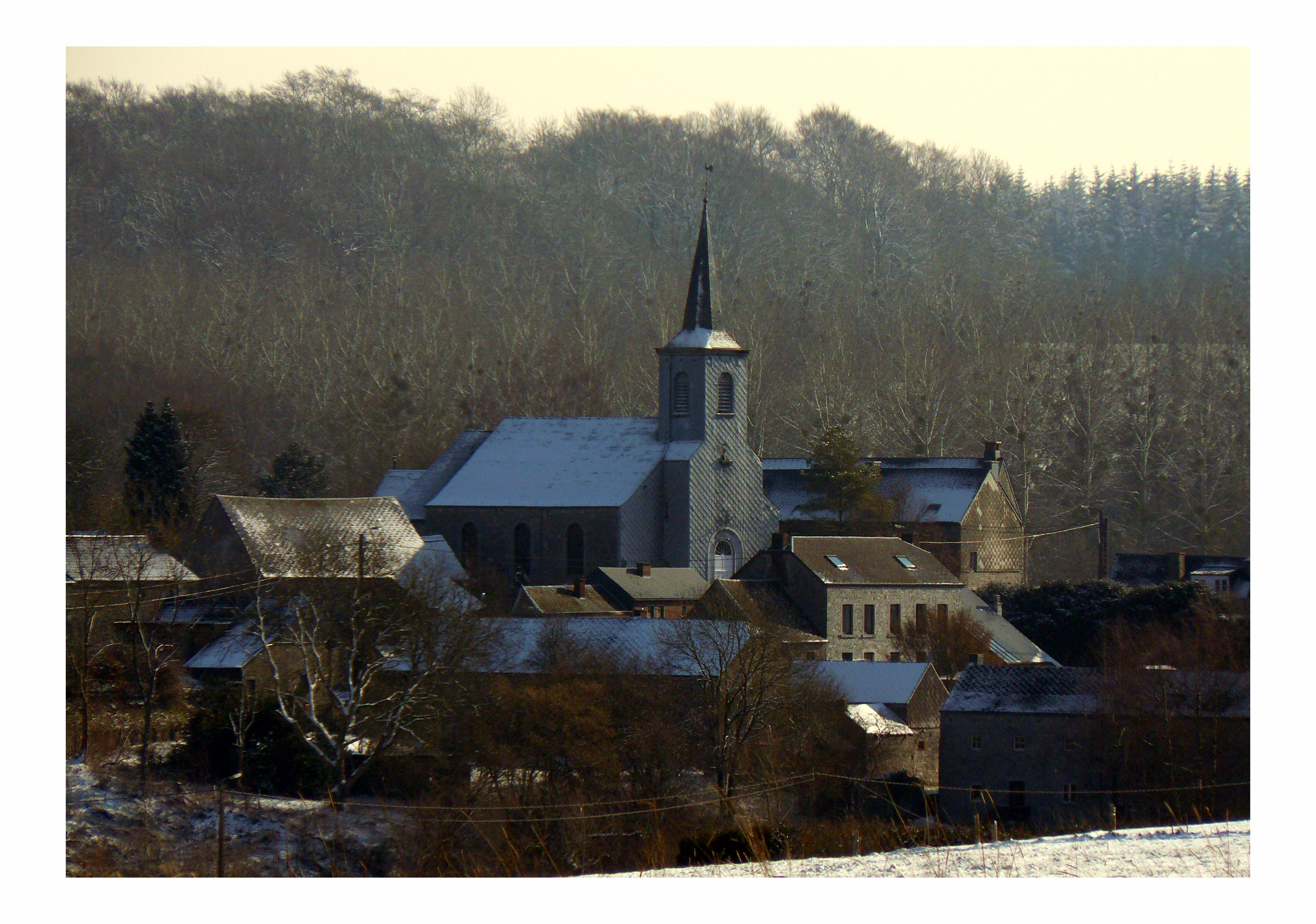
- Scy

- Location within Belgium Location within Europe
- Coordinates: 50°18′28″N 05°12′32″E
- Country: Belgium
- Region: Wallonia
- Province: Namur
- Municipality: Hamois

Scy (French pronunciation: [si]) is a village and a district in the municipality of Hamois, located in the province of Namur, Belgium.

The area has been inhabited since Neolithic times, as indicated by archaeological discoveries. The village contains several buildings from the 18th and 19th centuries. The village church is from 1847.
