= Tenneville =

Municipality in Wallonia, Belgium

Tenneville: Tiniveye (Walloon)
- Municipality
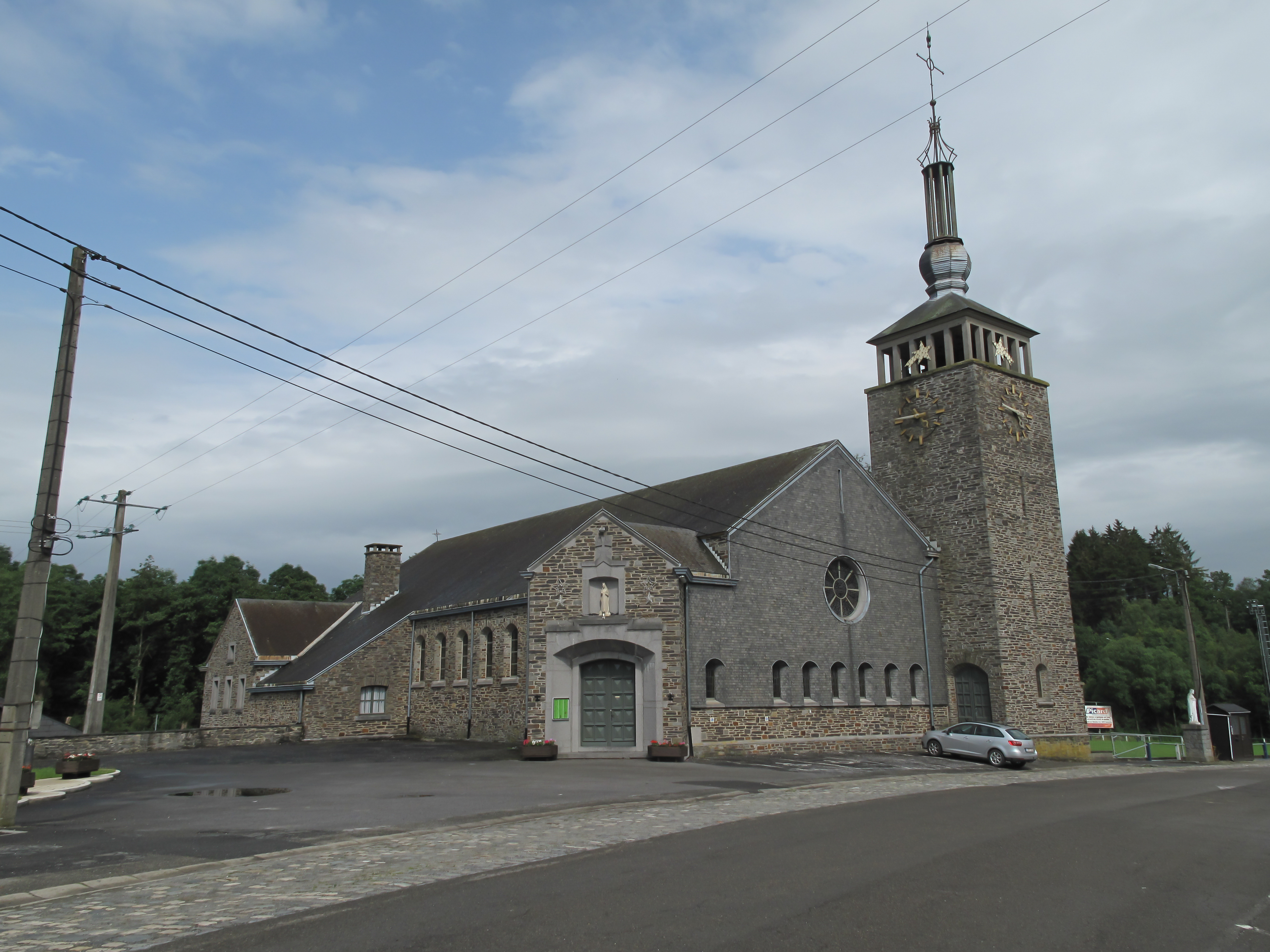
- Church of Notre-Dame de Beauraing (1957)

- Location of Tenneville in Luxembourg province
- Interactive map of Tenneville
- Location in Belgium
- Coordinates: 50°06′N 05°32′E
- Country: Belgium
- Community: French Community
- Region: Wallonia
- Province: Luxembourg
- Arrondissement: Marche-en-Famenne

Government
  - Mayor: Nicolas Charlier (cdH)
  - Governing party: IC Tenneville

Area
  - Total: 91.95 km^{2} (35.50 sq mi)

Population (2018-01-01)
  - Total: 2,842
  - Density: 30.91/km^{2} (80.05/sq mi)
- Postal codes: 6970-6972
- NIS code: 83049
- Area codes: 084
- Website: tenneville.be

Tenneville (French pronunciation: [tɛnvil]; Walloon: Tiniveye) is a municipality of Wallonia located in the province of Luxembourg, Belgium.

On 1 January 2018 the municipality, which covers 91.81 km^{2}, had 2,842 inhabitants, giving a population density of 31 inhabitants per km^{2}.

The municipality consists of the following districts: Champlon, Erneuville, and Tenneville. Other population centers include Baconfoy, Beaulieu, Belle-Vue, Berguème, Cens, Grainchamps, Journal, Laneuville-au-Bois, Mochamps, Ortheuville, Prelle, Ramont, Tresfontaines, Wembay, and Wyompont.
