= Natoye =

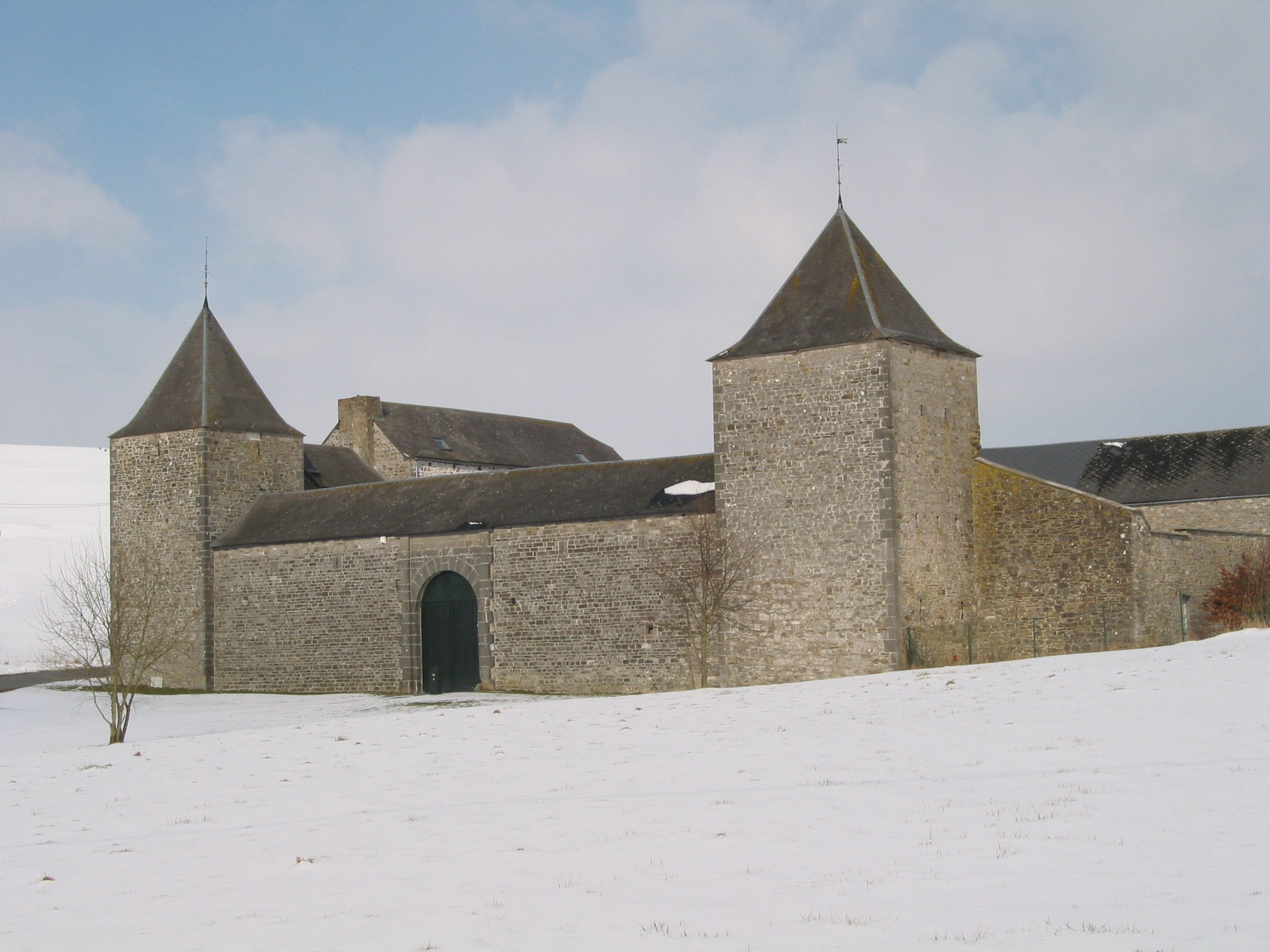
- Fortified farm in Natoye (17th century)

- Location within Belgium Location within Europe
- Coordinates: 50°20′12″N 05°03′56″E
- Country: Belgium
- Region: Wallonia
- Province: Namur
- Municipality: Hamois

Natoye is a village and a district in the municipality of Hamois, located in the province of Namur, Belgium.

During the Middle Ages the area was divided between the County of Namur, which owned the village Natoye, and the Prince-Bishopric of Liège, which owned the hamlet of Skeuvre. There is a fortified farm from the 17th century in the village, as well as a château, dating largely from a reconstruction made in 1875. In Skeuvre, there is also a château, an ensemble of buildings from the 18th and 19th centuries.
