= Fauvillers =

Municipality in Wallonia, Belgium

Fauvillers: Faiviè (Walloon)
- Municipality
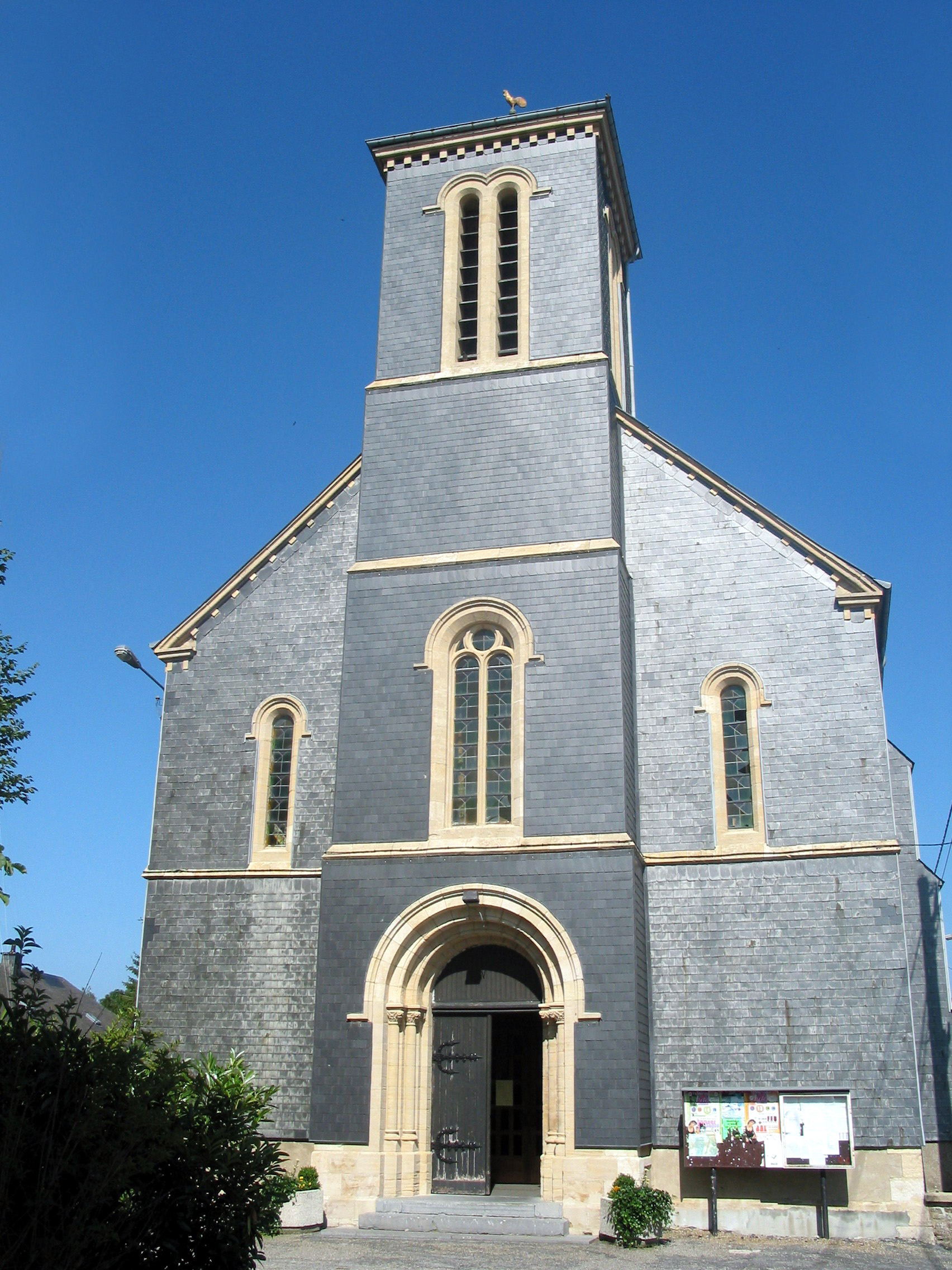
- Fauvillers: church of the Sacred Heart (1877)

- Location of Fauvillers in Luxembourg province
- Interactive map of Fauvillers
- Location in Belgium
- Coordinates: 49°51′N 05°40′E
- Country: Belgium
- Community: French Community
- Region: Wallonia
- Province: Luxembourg
- Arrondissement: Bastogne

Government
  - Mayor: Nicolas Stilmant
  - Governing party: Fauvillers Demain

Area
  - Total: 74.79 km^{2} (28.88 sq mi)

Population (2018-01-01)
  - Total: 2,253
  - Density: 30.12/km^{2} (78.02/sq mi)
- Postal codes: 6637
- NIS code: 82009
- Area codes: 063
- Website: www.fauvillers.be

Fauvillers (French pronunciation: [fovile]; German: Feitweiler; Luxembourgish: Fäteler; Walloon: Faiviè) is a municipality of Wallonia located in the province of Luxembourg, Belgium.

On 1 January 2007 the municipality, which covers 74.11 km^{2}, had 2,071 inhabitants, giving it a population density of 27.9 inhabitants per km^{2}.

The municipality consists of the following districts: Fauvillers, Hollange, and Tintange. Other population centers include:

- Bodange
- Burnon
- Honville
- Hotte
- Malmaison
- Menufontaine
- Sainlez
- Strainchamps
- Warnach
- Wisembach
