= Emptinne =

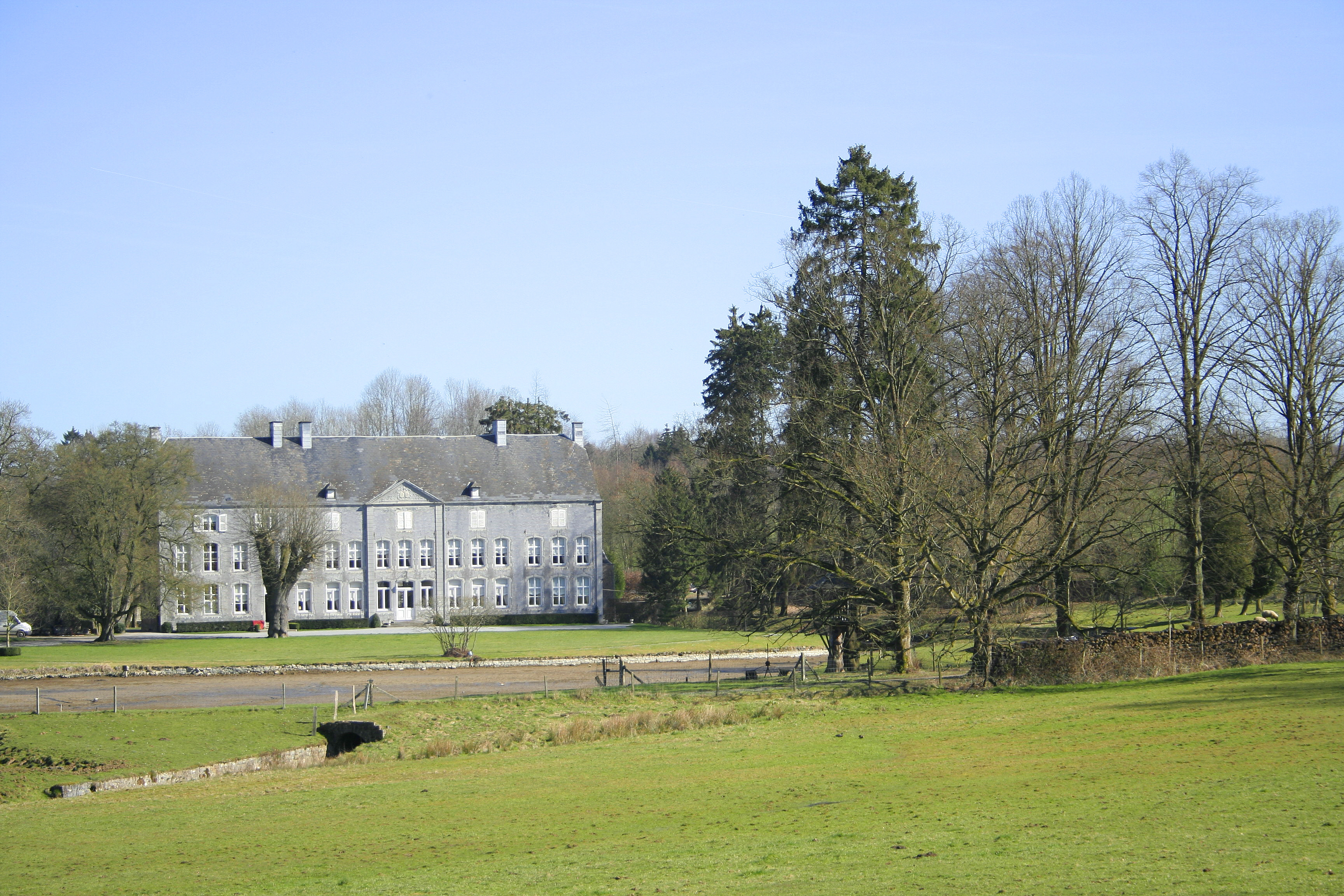
- Château de Fontaine (Emptinne) in Emptinne

- Location within Belgium Location within Europe
- Coordinates: 50°19′32″N 05°07′19″E
- Country: Belgium
- Region: Wallonia
- Province: Namur
- Municipality: Hamois

Emptinne (French pronunciation: [ɛmtin]; Walloon: Emtene-dilé-Hamwè) is a village and a district in the municipality of Hamois, located in the province of Namur, Belgium.

The area has been populated at least since Gallo-Roman times, as evidenced by archaeological discoveries. At the location of the hamlet Champion, a large Roman villa once stood. There are two châteaux in the district: the larger Château de Fontaine (Emptinne) south of the village Emptinne, and the smaller Château de Champion in the hamlet of the same name. The two settlements also contain several large farm buildings from the 18th and 19th centuries.
