= Vaux-sur-Sûre =

Municipality in Wallonia, Belgium

Vaux-sur-Sûre: Li Vå-so-Seure (Walloon)
- Municipality
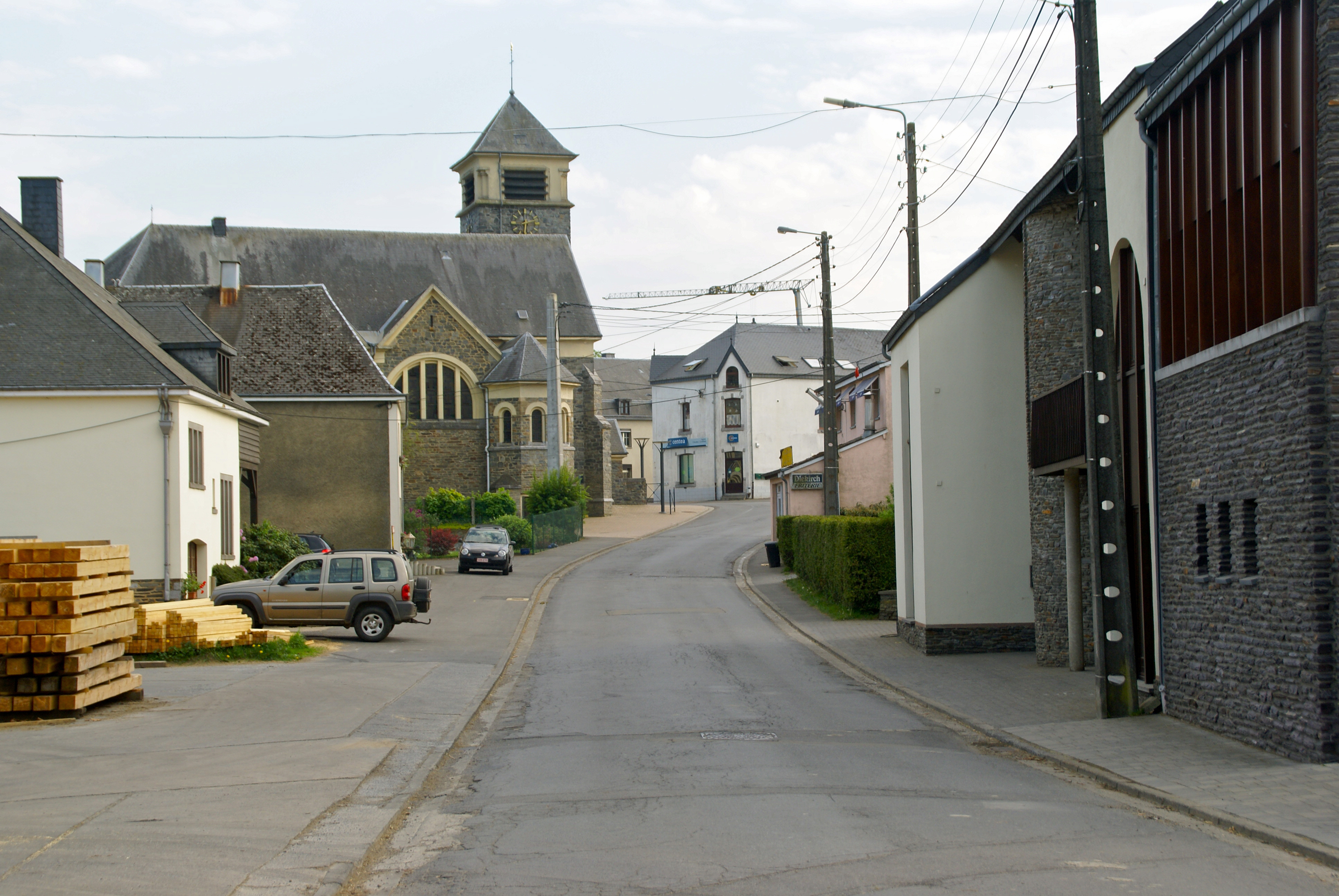

- Coat of arms

- Location of Vaux-sur-Sûre in Luxembourg province
- Interactive map of Vaux-sur-Sûre
- Location in Belgium
- Coordinates: 49°55′N 05°35′E
- Country: Belgium
- Community: French Community
- Region: Wallonia
- Province: Luxembourg
- Arrondissement: Bastogne

Government
  - Mayor: Yves Besseling (MR)

Area
  - Total: 135.72 km^{2} (52.40 sq mi)

Population (2018-01-01)
  - Total: 5,651
  - Density: 41.64/km^{2} (107.8/sq mi)
- Postal codes: 6640, 6642
- NIS code: 82036
- Area codes: 061
- Website: www.vaux-sur-sure.be

Vaux-sur-Sûre (French pronunciation: [vo syʁ syʁ], Vaux on Sûre; Walloon: Li Vå-so-Seure) is a municipality of Wallonia located in the province of Luxembourg, Belgium.

On 1 January 2007 the municipality, which covers 135.87 km^{2}, had 4,759 inhabitants, giving a population density of 35 inhabitants per km^{2}.

The municipality consists of the following districts: Hompré, Juseret, Morhet, Nives, Sibret, and Vaux-lez-Rosières (town centre). Other population centers include:

- Assenois
- Belleau
- Bercheux
- Chaumont
- Chenogne
- Clochimont
- Cobreville
- Grandru
- Jodenville
- La Barrière
- Lavaselle
- Lescheret
- Mande-Sainte-Marie
- Morhet-Station
- Poisson-Moulin
- Remichampagne
- Remience
- Remoiville
- Rosières
- Salvacourt
- Sûre
- Villeroux

== See also ==
- List of protected heritage sites in Vaux-sur-Sûre
