= Flamierge =

Flamierge Flamidje (Walloon)
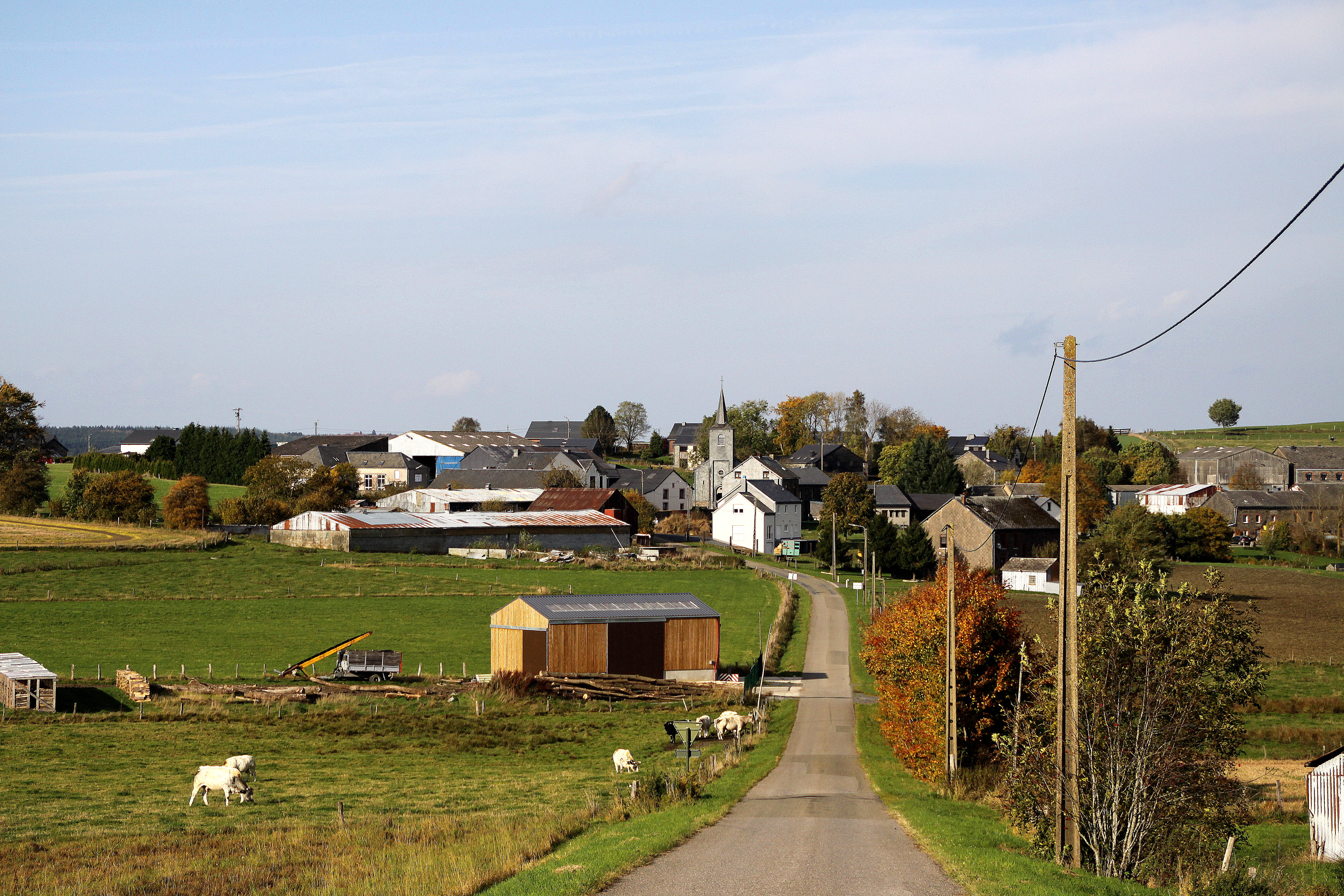
- Flamierge

- Location within Belgium Location within Europe
- Coordinates: 50°02′02″N 05°36′18″E
- Country: Belgium
- Region: Wallonia
- Province: Luxembourg
- Municipality: Bastogne

Flamierge (French pronunciation: [flamjɛʁʒ]; Walloon: Flamidje) is a village of Wallonia and a district of the municipality of Bastogne, located in the province of Luxembourg, Belgium.

During the Battle of the Bulge of World War II, elements of the US 17th Airborne Division were engaged in fighting around Flamierge in January 1945.
