= Léglise =

Municipality in Wallonia, Belgium

Léglise Leglijhe (Walloon)
- Municipality
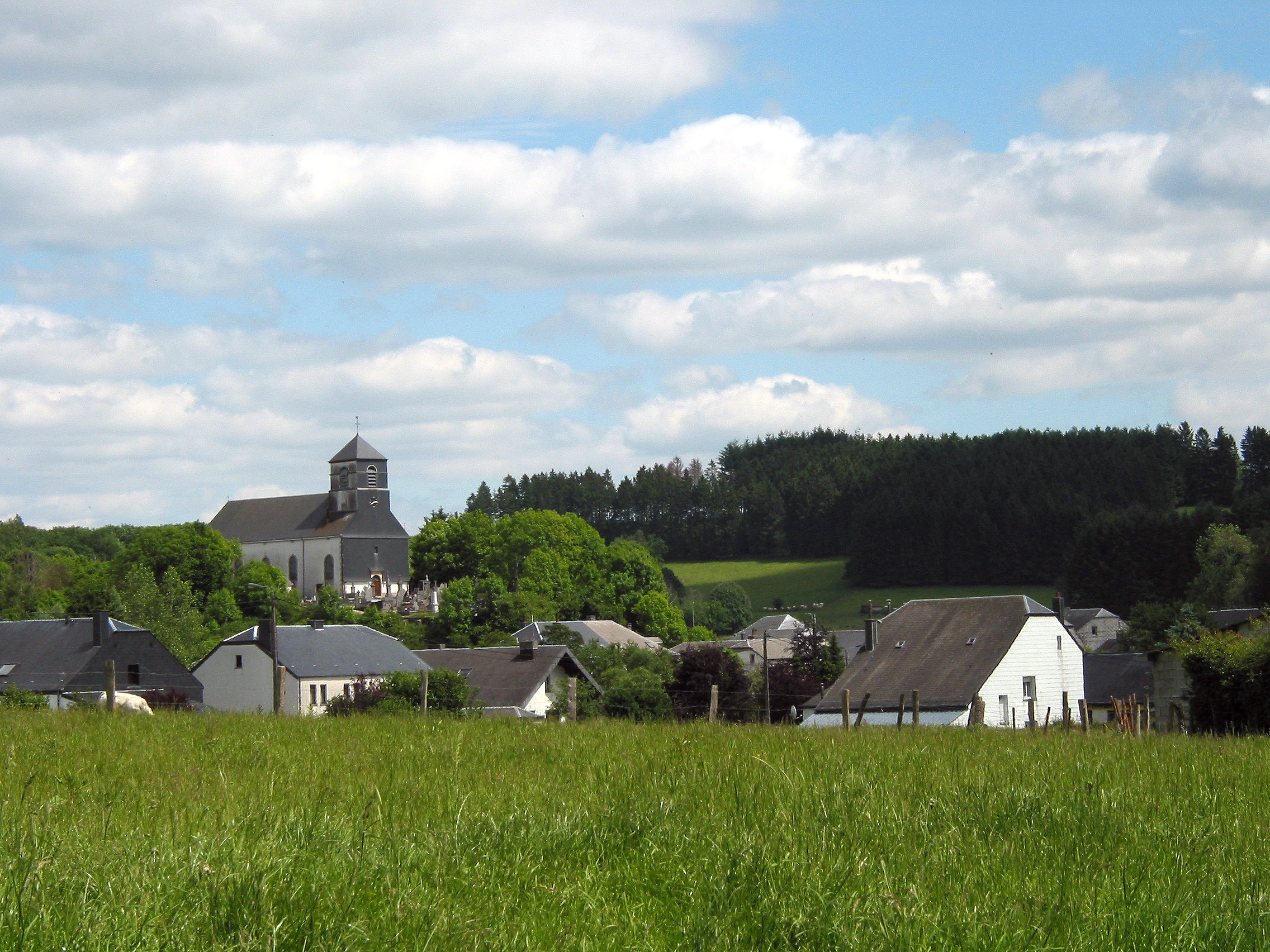
- Léglise: the village and its small church

- Flag Coat of arms

- Location of Léglise in Luxembourg province
- Interactive map of Léglise
- Location in Belgium
- Coordinates: 49°48′01″N 05°32′16″E
- Country: Belgium
- Community: French Community
- Region: Wallonia
- Province: Luxembourg
- Arrondissement: Neufchâteau

Government
  - Mayor: Francis Demasy

Area
  - Total: 173.72 km^{2} (67.07 sq mi)

Population (2018-01-01)
  - Total: 5,366
  - Density: 30.89/km^{2} (80.00/sq mi)
- Postal codes: 6860
- NIS code: 84033
- Area codes: 063
- Website: www.communeleglise.be

Léglise (French pronunciation: [leɡliz]; Walloon: Leglijhe) is a municipality of Wallonia, located in the province of Luxembourg, Belgium.

== Population ==
On 1 January 2007 the municipality, had 4,178 inhabitants, giving a population density of 24.2 inhabitants per km^{2}.

== Area ==
The municipality covers 172.92 km^{2}.

== Sub-Municipalities ==
The municipality consists of the following districts :

Assenois, Ébly, Léglise, Mellier, and Witry.

Other population centers include :

- Behême
- Bernimont
- Bombois
- Burnaimont
- Chêne
- Chevaudos
- Gennevaux
- Habaru
- Lavaux
- Les Fossés
- Louftémont
- Maisoncelle
- Narcimont
- Naleumont
- Nivelet
- Rancimont
- Thibessart
- Traimont
- Vaux-lez-Chêne
- Vlessart
- Volaiville
- Winville
- Witimont

== See also ==
- List of protected heritage sites in Léglise
