= Hamois =

Municipality in Wallonia, Belgium

Hamois Hamwè (Walloon)
- Municipality
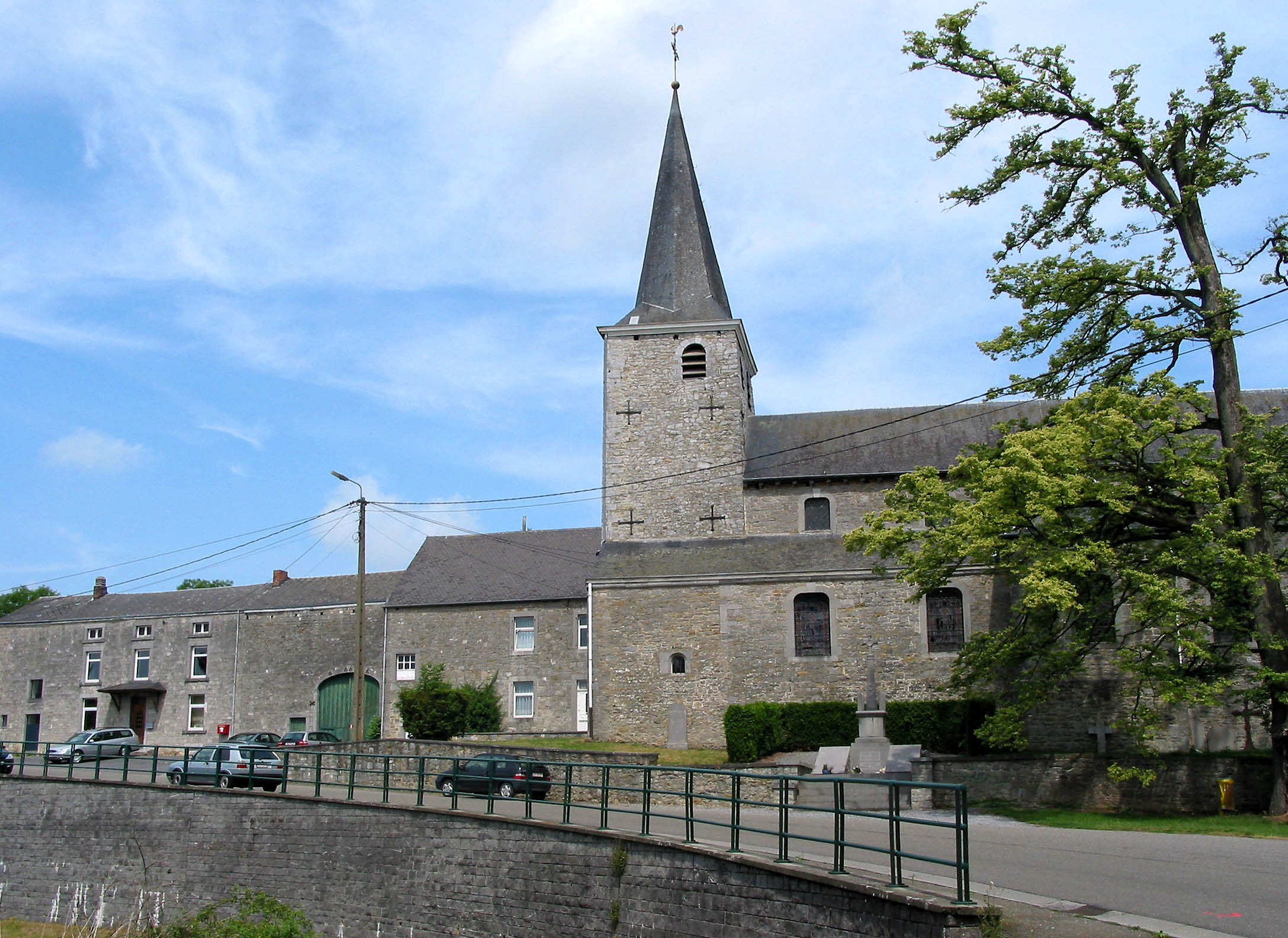

- Coat of arms

- Location of Hamois in Namur province
- Interactive map of Hamois
- Location in Belgium
- Coordinates: 50°20′N 05°08′E
- Country: Belgium
- Community: French Community
- Region: Wallonia
- Province: Namur
- Arrondissement: Dinant

Government
  - Mayor: Valérie Caverenne-Warzée
  - Governing party: Ensemble2018

Area
  - Total: 76.6 km^{2} (29.6 sq mi)

Population (2018-01-01)
  - Total: 7,349
  - Density: 95.9/km^{2} (248/sq mi)
- Postal codes: 5360-5364
- NIS code: 91059
- Area codes: 083
- Website: www.hamois.be

Hamois (French pronunciation: [amwa]; Walloon: Hamwè) is a municipality of Wallonia located in the province of Namur, Belgium.

The village is around 25 km (16 mi) south-east of the city of Namur.

On 1 January 2020 the municipality had 7,375 inhabitants. The total area is 76.42 km^{2}, giving a population density of 96.5 inhabitants per km^{2}.

The municipality consists of the following districts: Achet, Emptinne, Hamois, Mohiville, Natoye, Schaltin, and Scy.

Mouffrin Castle in Gemenne and Ry Castle are both in Hamois, and continue to be in the possession of the noble Aspremont-Lynden family.

Multiple other castles, still owned and inhabited by other noble families, are spread all over the municipality. One of them, the Castle of Skeuvre, still owned and inhabited by the de Beaudignies family, is noticeably known as the "Spirou Castle", after Franquin got inspiration from it to create the Champignac castle that is depicted in these comics.

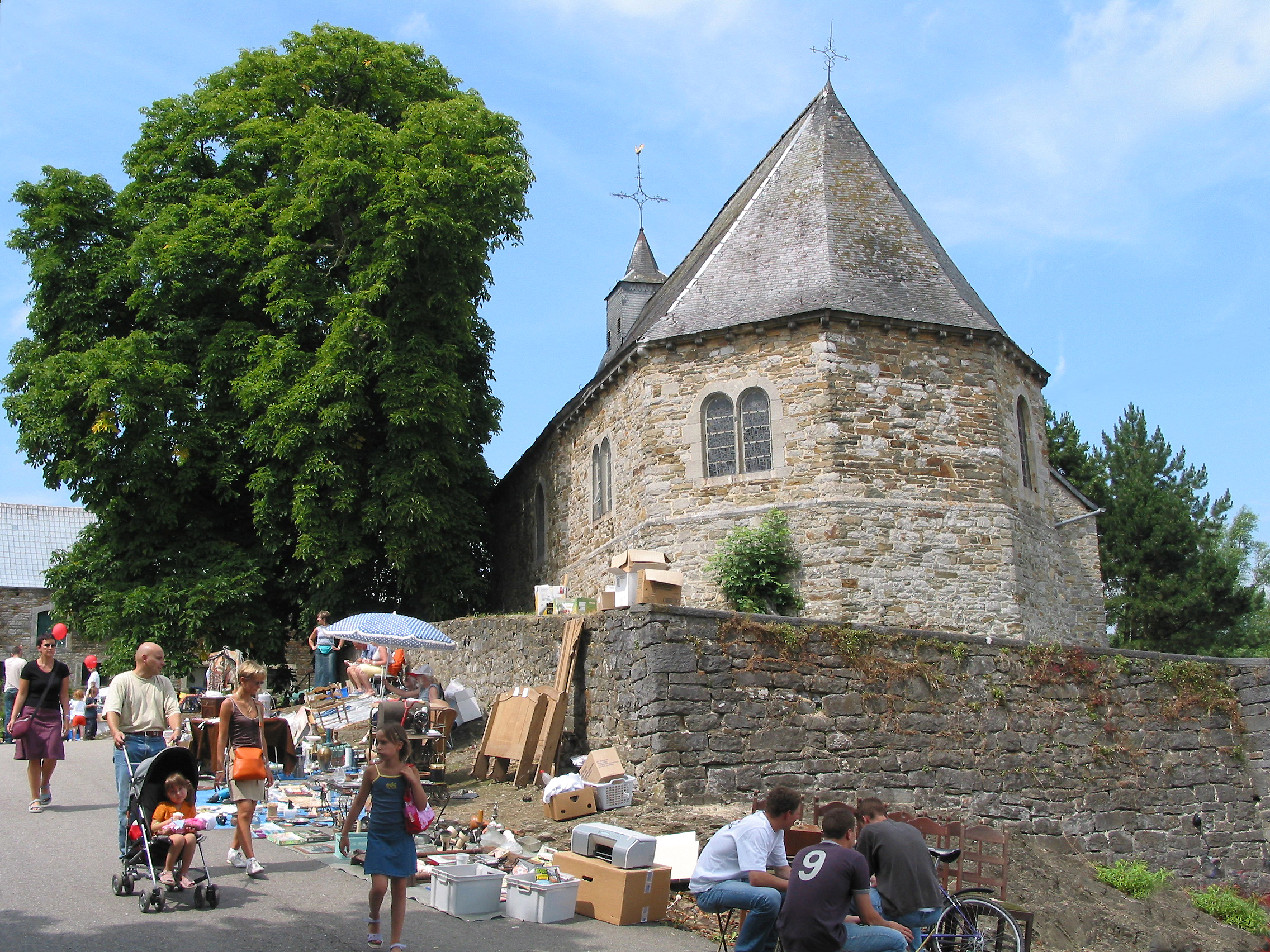
St. Agathe d'Hubinne chapel (13th - 17th centuries)

== See also ==
- List of protected heritage sites in Hamois
