= Étalle, Belgium =

Municipality in Wallonia, Belgium

Étalle
- Municipality
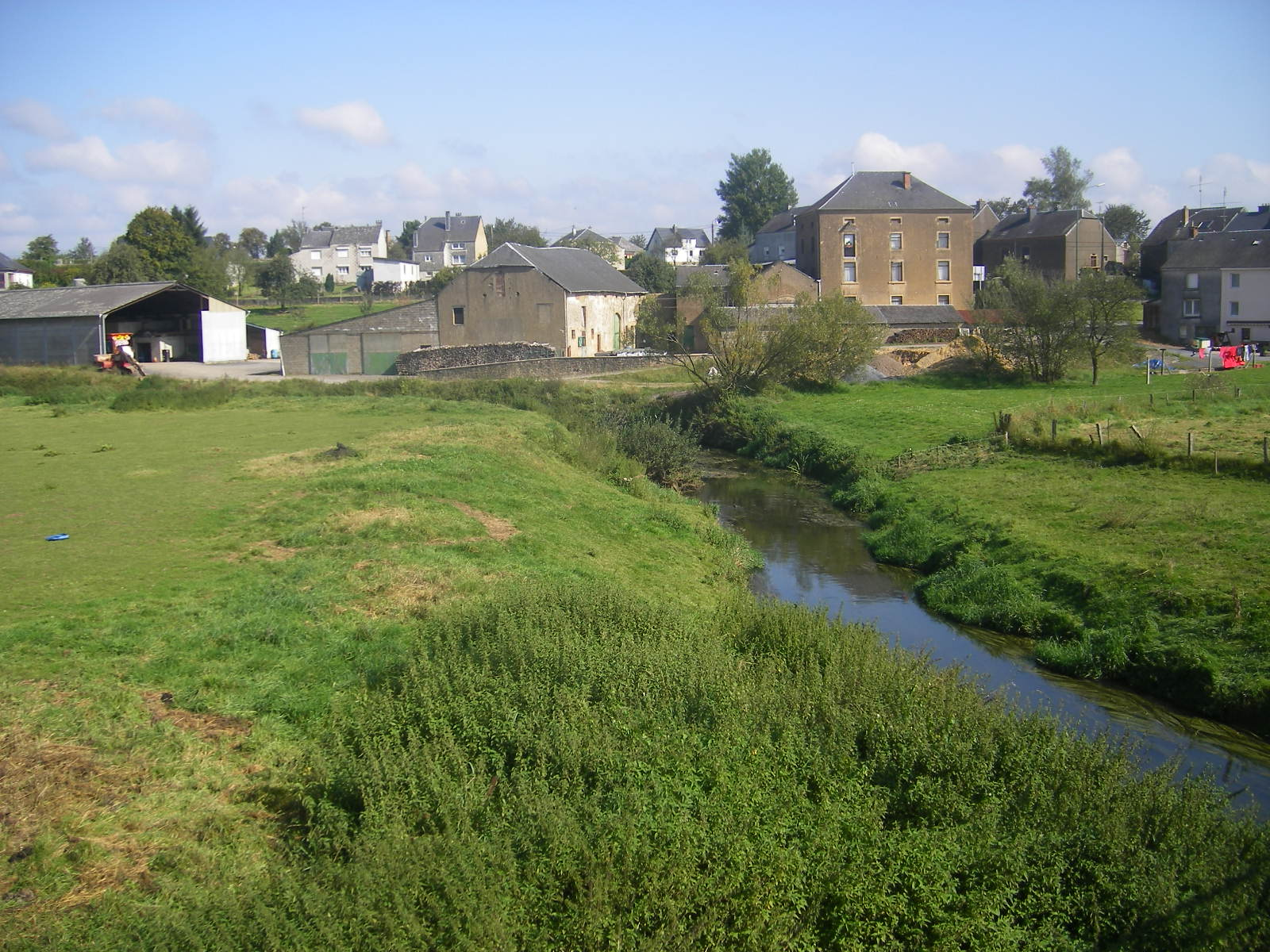

- Flag Coat of arms

- Location of Étalle in Luxembourg province
- Interactive map of Étalle
- Location in Belgium
- Coordinates: 49°41′N 05°36′E
- Country: Belgium
- Community: French Community
- Region: Wallonia
- Province: Luxembourg
- Arrondissement: Virton

Government
  - Mayor: Henry Thiry (MR)
  - Governing party: Mayeur

Area
  - Total: 79.44 km^{2} (30.67 sq mi)

Population (2018-01-01)
  - Total: 5,855
  - Density: 73.70/km^{2} (190.9/sq mi)
- Postal codes: 6740-6743
- NIS code: 85009
- Area codes: 063
- Website: www.etalle.be

Étalle (French pronunciation: [etal]; Lorrain: Ètaule) is a municipality of Wallonia located in the province of Luxembourg, Belgium.

On 1 January 2007 the municipality, which covers 78.1 km^{2} (30.2 sq mi), had 5,389 inhabitants, giving a population density of 69 inhabitants/km^{2} (180 inhabitants/sq mi).

The municipality consists of the following districts: Buzenol, Chantemelle, Étalle, Sainte-Marie-sur-Semois, Vance, and Villers-sur-Semois. Other population centers include: Croix Rouge, Fratin, Huombois, and Sivry.

== See also ==
- List of protected heritage sites in Étalle, Belgium
