= Nervia (disambiguation) =

The Nervia is a stream in Liguria, Italy.

Nervia may refer to:

- Nervia (butterfly), a genus of butterflies in the tribe Astictopterini
- Nervia (star), HD 49674, a G-type star in the constellation Auriga
- Groupe Nervia (French: Nervia Group), a Belgian artistic circle

== See also ==
- Nervii, a Belgic tribe of northern Gaul
- Colonia Nervia Glevensium, a Roman fort in Britannia; now Gloucester
- Cohors I Augusta Nervia Pacensis Brittonum, a Roman auxiliary infantry cohort
- The Valley of the Nervia, a painting by Claude Monet
