= List of protected heritage sites in Marche-en-Famenne =

This table shows an overview of the protected heritage sites in the Walloon town Marche-en-Famenne. This list is part of Belgium's national heritage.

| Object | Year/architect | Town/section | Address | Coordinates | Number^{?} | Image |
|---|---|---|---|---|---|---|
| Church of Saint Remacle ^{(nl)} ^{(fr)} | | Marche-en-Famenne | | 50.228014°N 5.344047°E | 83034-CLT-0001-01 | Kerk Saint-Remacle |
| Land and buildings around the church of Saint-Etienne and its cemetery ^{(nl)} ^{(fr)} | | Marche-en-Famenne | Waha | 50.213717°N 5.344440°E | 83034-CLT-0002-01 | Terreinen en gebouwen rond de kerk Saint-Etienne en zijn kerkhof |
| Site formed by the chapel of Trinity and the avenue of the "Monument" ^{(nl)} ^{(fr)} | | Marche-en-Famenne | | 50.220373°N 5.334154°E | 83034-CLT-0003-01 | |
| Chapel Sainte-Trinité and shrine of Saint-Sépulcre, (Holy Saint) ^{(nl)} ^{(fr)} | | Marche-en-Famenne | | 50.220454°N 5.334674°E | 83034-CLT-0005-01 | Kapel Sainte-Trinité en het heiligdom Saint-Sépulcre |
| Maison Jadot ^{(nl)} ^{(fr)} | | Marche-en-Famenne | Grand'Rue, tegenwoordig rue du Commerce n°17 | 50.227026°N 5.343640°E | 83034-CLT-0007-01 | "Maison Jadot" |
| The facades and roofs of buildings called Maison Jadot and the ensemble formed by two buildings of the house and garden Jadot ^{(nl)} ^{(fr)} | | Marche-en-Famenne | | 50.226844°N 5.343532°E | 83034-CLT-0008-01 | |
| House "Dochain," called "Le Manoir" ^{(nl)} ^{(fr)} | | Marche-en-Famenne | rue Victor Libert n°2 | 50.227261°N 5.342640°E | 83034-CLT-0010-01 | |
| Castle and farm ^{(nl)} ^{(fr)} | | Marche-en-Famenne | rue Félix Lefèvre n°s 59-60 | 50.186258°N 5.313637°E | 83034-CLT-0011-01 | Kasteel en boerderij |
| Chapel of Saint-Christophe ^{(nl)} ^{(fr)} | | Marche-en-Famenne | | 50.185799°N 5.310264°E | 83034-CLT-0012-01 | Kapel Saint-Christophe |
| Saint-Etienne church and surrounding cemetery ^{(nl)} ^{(fr)} | | Marche-en-Famenne | | 50.212272°N 5.343572°E | 83034-CLT-0013-01 | Kerk Saint-Etienne en de omliggende begraafplaats |
| Totality of the chaplain's house ^{(nl)} ^{(fr)} | | Marche-en-Famenne | | 50.227118°N 5.341705°E | 83034-CLT-0014-01 | Totaliteit van het kapelaanshuis |
| Building "Au Vieux Marche": facades, roofs and those of the porch on the side ^{(nl)} ^{(fr)} | | Marche-en-Famenne | rue du Commerce, n°15 | 50.227078°N 5.343511°E | 83034-CLT-0015-01 | |
| Farmhouse Blancs Curé facades and roofs of the two main buildings ^{(nl)} ^{(fr)} | | Marche-en-Famenne | rue du Maquis, n°2 | 50.212067°N 5.341719°E | 83034-CLT-0016-01 | Boerderij van Blancs Curé: gevels en daken van de twee hoofdgebouwen |
| House: totality of the facades and roofs ^{(nl)} ^{(fr)} | | Marche-en-Famenne | rue du Maquis n°4 | 50.211326°N 5.341129°E | 83034-CLT-0017-01 | Huis: totaliteit van de gevels en daken |
| Former Jesuit church known as "Casino" (facades and roofs) ^{(nl)} ^{(fr)} | | Marche-en-Famenne | rue des Brasseurs, n°2 | 50.227632°N 5.345443°E | 83034-CLT-0018-01 | Voormalige jezuïetenkerk bekend als "Casino" (gevels en daken) |
| Farm Bruges (facades and roofs of all buildings, the four parts of the existing old house with the vaulted cellars, the Gothic elements of the chimney of the building, surrounding walls and the garden and cobbled courtyard), and the ensemble formed by these buildings and surrounding areas ^{(nl)} ^{(fr)} | | Marche-en-Famenne | rue de l'Eglise n°16 | 50.200938°N 5.315636°E | 83034-CLT-0019-01 | Boerderij Brugge (gevels en daken van alle gebouwen, de vier delen van de bestaande oude huis met de gewelfde kelders, de elementen van de gotische schouw van het hoofdgebouw, omliggende muren en de tuin en de geplaveide binnenplaats), en het ensemble gevormd door deze gebouwen en omliggende terreinen |
| House: walls and roofs ^{(nl)} ^{(fr)} | | Marche-en-Famenne | rue du Commerce n°3 | 50.227216°N 5.342978°E | 83034-CLT-0020-01 | |
| Farmhouse and setting a protection zone ^{(nl)} ^{(fr)} | | Marche-en-Famenne | rue de la Forêt n°54 | 50.216990°N 5.384914°E | 83034-CLT-0021-01 | |
| Castle of Waha: facades and roofs, including the two extensions on the edge of the paved courtyard and the castle park ^{(nl)} ^{(fr)} | | Marche-en-Famenne | | 50.215174°N 5.345844°E | 83034-CLT-0022-01 | Kasteel van Waha: gevels en daken, waaronder de twee aanbouwen gelegen aan de rand van de geplaveide binnenplaats en het kasteelpark |
| Saint-Georges Church Complex in Marloie and the establishment of a buffer zone around the property ^{(fr)} | 1956 Victor Sarlet | Marloie Marche-en-Famenne | Rue de la Station | 50.2007°N 5.3164°E | 83034-CLT-0026-01 | |
| Ensemble of the church of Saint-Etienne, except the organ (instrumental part and buffet) ^{(nl)} ^{(fr)} | | Marche-en-Famenne | | 50.212272°N 5.343572°E | 83034-PEX-0001-01 | Ensemble van de kerk Saint-Etienne, uitgezonderd het orgel (instrumentaal deel en buffet) |

== See also ==
- List of protected heritage sites in Luxembourg (Belgium)
- Marche-en-Famenne
