= List of protected heritage sites in La Roche-en-Ardenne =

Overview of Protected heritage site

This table shows an overview of the protected heritage sites in the Walloon town La Roche-en-Ardenne. This list is part of Belgium's national heritage.

Object	Year/architect	Town/section	Address	Coordinates	Number^{?}	Image
Chapel Sainte-Marguerite ^{(nl)} ^{(fr)}		La Roche-en-Ardenne	rue Sainte-Marguerite	50.183611°N 5.579932°E	83031-CLT-0001-01 Info	Kapel Sainte-Marguerite
Old castle of La Roche-en-Ardenne ^{(nl)} ^{(fr)}		La Roche-en-Ardenne	rue du Vieux Château	50.182089°N 5.576592°E	83031-CLT-0003-01 Info	Oud kasteel van La-Roche-en-Ardenne More images
Rocky outcrop called "Les Cailloux the Mousny" ^{(nl)} ^{(fr)}		La Roche-en-Ardenne		50.104980°N 5.598165°E	83031-CLT-0004-01 Info	
Fange aux Mochettes ^{(nl)} ^{(fr)}		La Roche-en-Ardenne		50.220037°N 5.664588°E	83031-CLT-0005-01 Info	
Building in Cielle hamlet now a farm, including outbuildings: n ° 45 ^{(nl)} ^{(fr)}		La Roche-en-Ardenne	Cielle	50.194695°N 5.560514°E	83031-CLT-0006-01 Info	
Hérou site: meanders of the Ourthe: area of special value ^{(nl)} ^{(fr)}		La Roche-en-Ardenne		50.149259°N 5.648406°E	83031-CLT-0007-01 Info	
Ensemble of the site Cheslé and the valley of the Ourthe between Nisramont and Naboge, and fortifications of Cheslé in Bérismenil and old trails that meander along the river Ourthe, including irrigration meadow Baltazar from the 18th century, beginning in the southern tip and along the shore and the river bed to the height of Hache. In addition, the establishment of two protected areas: Basse-zone and zone Noupre Sasseux and Les Houba. ^{(nl)} ^{(fr)}		La Roche-en-Ardenne		50.169880°N 5.645180°E	83031-CLT-0008-01 Info	Ensemble van de site Cheslé en de vallei van de Ourthe tussen Nisramont en Naboge, en de versterking van de Cheslé te Berismenil en oude paden die slingeren langs de meanderende Ourthe, met inbegrip van het irrigratiebereik van pré Baltazar uit de 18e eeuw, beginnende in het zuidelijke puntje en langs de oever en de rivierbedding tot aan de hoogte van Hache. Daarnaast de oprichting van twee beschermde gebieden: zone Basse-Noupré en zone Sasseux en Les Houba. More images
The mud in Mochetti ^{(nl)} ^{(fr)}		La Roche-en-Ardenne		50.220037°N 5.664588°E	83031-PEX-0001-01 Info	
Ensemble of the site Cheslé and the valley of the Ourthe between Naboge and Nisramont ^{(nl)} ^{(fr)}		La Roche-en-Ardenne		50.169880°N 5.645180°E	83031-PEX-0002-01 Info	Ensemble van de site Cheslé en de vallei van de Ourthe tussen Naboge en Nisramont More images
Hérou site (meanders of the Ourthe): area of special value ^{(nl)} ^{(fr)}		La Roche-en-Ardenne		50.149259°N 5.648406°E	83031-PEX-0003-01 Info	

== See also ==
- List of protected heritage sites in Luxembourg (Belgium)
