= Habsch =

Habsch is a surname. Notable people with the surname include:

- Mary Habsch (born 1931), Belgian painter
- Roger Habsch (born 1979), Belgian para-athlete
