= Ortho =

Ortho- is a Greek prefix meaning “straight”, “upright”, “right” or “correct”.

Ortho may also refer to:

== Science ==
- List of commonly used taxonomic affixes (ortho-)
- Arene substitution patterns, two substituents that occupy adjacent positions on an aromatic ring
- Chlordane, an organochlorine compound that was used as a pesticide

== Mathematics ==
- Orthogonal, a synonym for perpendicular
- Orthonormal, the property that a collection of vectors are mutually perpendicular and each of unit magnitude
- Orthodrome, a synonym for great circle, a geodesic on the sphere
- Orthographic projection, a parallel projection onto a perpendicular plane

== Medicine ==
- Orthomyxovirus, a family of viruses to which influenza belongs
- Orthodontics, a specialty of dentistry concerned with the study and treatment of malocclusions
- Orthopedic, the study of the musculoskeletal system
- Ortho-DOT, a psychedelic drug
- Ortho-cept and Ortho Tri-cyclen, kinds of oral contraceptive drug

== Theology ==
- Orthodoxy, right (correct) belief
- Orthopraxy, right (correct) action

== Business ==
- Ortho Pharmaceutical, which merged into Ortho-McNeil Pharmaceutical before being bought by Johnson & Johnson
- Ortho-Clinical Diagnostics, a subsidiary of Quidel Corporation
- Ortho, a lawn care and pesticide company owned by the Scotts Miracle-Gro Company

== Other uses ==
- Ortho, Belgium, a village in the Belgian province of Luxembourg
- Ortho Stice, in the 1996 novel Infinite Jest

== See also ==
- Orthos (disambiguation)
- Ortho Mode Transducer
- Orthochromatic
- Orthophotography
- Orthoptera
