= Andrée Bosquet =

Belgian painter (1900–1980)

- Self Portrait, 1924
- Born: 1900; Tournai, Belgium
- Died: 1980 (aged 79–80); La Louvière, Belgium
- Known for: Painting
- Spouse: Frans Depooter (m. 1923)
- Awards: Charles Caty Prize (1963)

Andrée Bosquet (13 March 1900 – 27 June 1980) was a Belgian painter.

Bosquet was born on 13 March 1900, in Tournai. She died in La Louvière on 27 June 1980. Her husband was fellow Belgian artist Frans Depooter. Her father was a mathematician at the Ecole des Mines de Mons who had formed a quartet in which his son-in-law participated in.

Coming from cultured society, she took painting courses with M. Putsage (pastel), Anto Carte, and E.Motte, but she was primarily self-taught. She exhibited regularly from 1922 onwards, invited in particular by the Groupe Nervia and Le Bon Vouloir (Mons). She was awarded the Charles Caty Prize in 1963. Using oil, red chalk and charcoal, Andrée Bosquet painted and drew, with simplicity and delicate elegance but without affectation, self-portraits and children's portraits, restful and clear still lifes, and bouquets of an exquisite fragility. Her choice went towards soft and fine colors in half-tints and towards round and statuesque shapes. Her style cannot be connected with any school defined by art history, even though it might be likened to the Florentine Primitives or have common features with naïve art or Symbolism. Her works can be seen in various Belgian museums (Ghent, Brussels, Mons, La Louvière).
