= Hamoir station =

Former railway station in Liège, Belgium

Hamoir
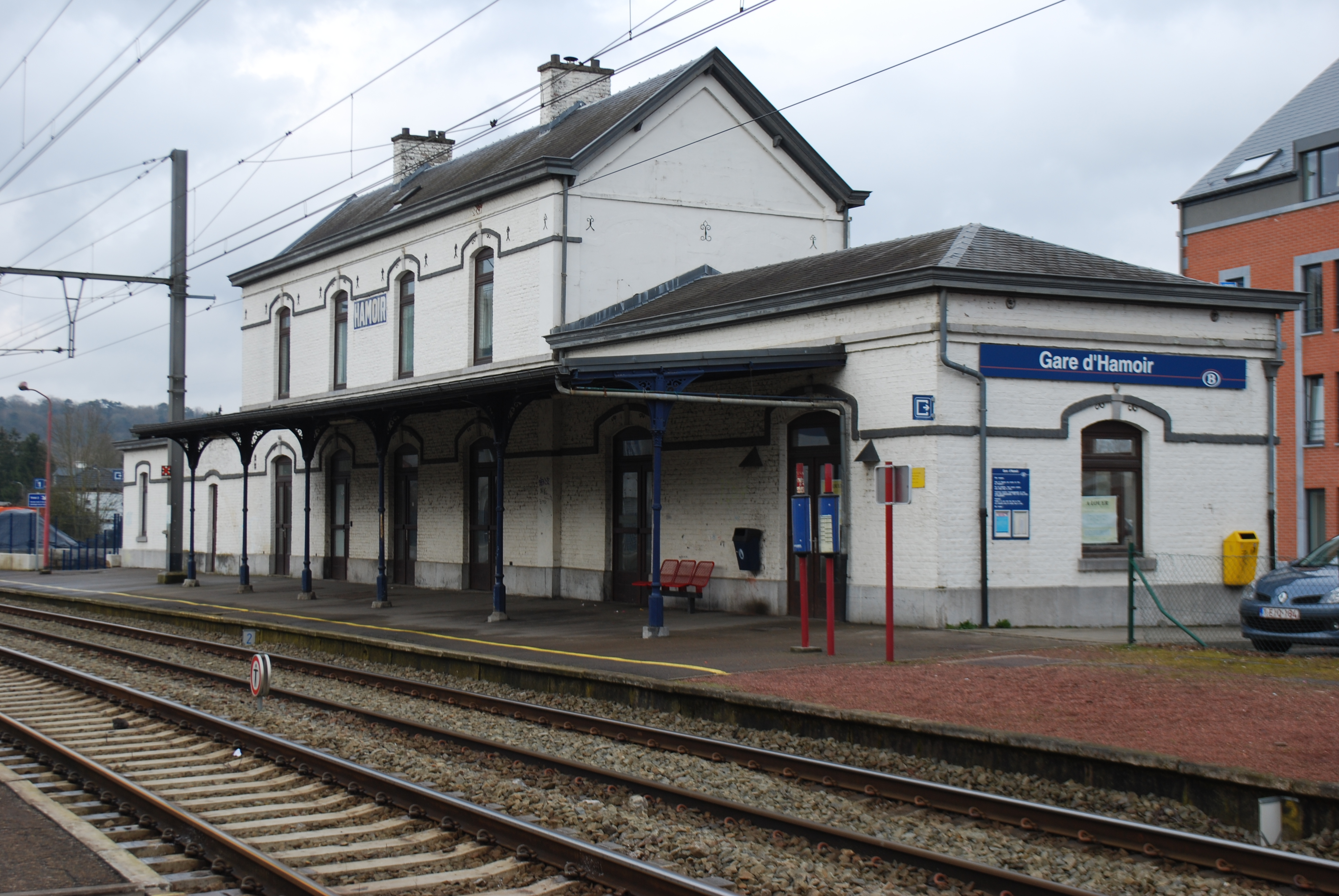
- Hamoir station in 2013

General information
- Coordinates: 50°25′42″N 5°32′02″E

History
- Opened: first building: 1866, current building: 1873
- Closed: 2015
Location

Hamoir station serves the municipality of Hamoir, Wallonia, located in the province of Liège, Belgium.

The station is located at kilometer point (PK) 23.40 on along the Ourthe line from Angleur to Marloie, between Comblain-la-Tour and Sy stations. The station is 119m above sea-level.

== History ==
Service at Hamoir station was inaugurated on 1 August 1866 by the Grande Compagnie du Luxembourg (GCL) when it opened the section of the rail line from Melreux to Angleur (Liège), with the opening of the entirety of the Ourthe line. When opened, the station had a passenger terminal, a goods shed and a small locomotive depot.

The Belgian State Railways became the operator of the GCL network in 1873 and had a new structure built at the site. It originally had stepped gables which were fashionable for Belgian stations built during the period. They were subsequently leveled.

The passenger waiting room was closed in 2015; the station has been unoccupied since that date. The SNCB, (after discussions with the municipality), decided to put the station up for sale on 1 February 2023 at a list price of €138,000. Despite the building being closed since 2015, the municipality has promised to support any buyers of the property, hoping to see an adaptive re-use of the building. The current parking lot is in poor condition, but will be transformed into an electric vehicle charging station with parking for 60 cars, likely in 2024. The building has 4 rooms, 356 m^{2} of living space, 40m of frontage along the street, a basement and an attic.
