= Léon Devos =

Léon Devos may refer to:

- Léon Devos (artist) (1897–1974), Belgian painter
- Léon Devos (cyclist) (1896–1963), Belgian racing cyclist
