= Orthographic =

Orthographic may refer to:

- topics related to orthography, a linguistic discipline that studies and regulates writing systems of particular languages.
  - Orthographic reform
  - Orthographic transcription
  - Orthographic variant
  - Orthographic depth
  - Orthographic Latinisation
- Orthographic projection
  - Orthographic projection (geometry)
  - Orthographic projection (cartography)

== See also ==
- Ortho (disambiguation)
- -graphy
