= Groupe Nervia =

Founded in 1928 (97 years ago) at the instigation of the insurance broker Léon Eeckman and of the painters Anto-Carte and Louis Buisseret, the Groupe Nervia was a Belgian artistic circle, the purpose of which was to foster Walloon art, obscured by the Flemish Expressionism of the Laethem-Saint-Martin School, by supporting young talented artists of Hainaut. It included, in addition to Anto-Carte, eight other painters: Louis Buisseret, Frans Depooter, Léon Devos, Léon Navez, Pierre Paulus, Rodolphe Strebelle, Taf Wallet and Jean Winance. Nervia's art claims a Latin essence and is more realistic, lyric and intimist than their northern neighbors’. In addition to their obvious skills, Nervia's artists refused avant-garde at all costs, deeply studied other artists, and expressed a sort of neo-humanism through themes taken from everyday and family life, treated with harmony and idealism.

Twenty exhibitions were organized between 1928 and 1938, together with other guest artists (Andrée Bosquet, Gustave Camus, Alphonse Darville, Élisabeth Ivanovsky, Geo Verbanck, Fernand Wéry and Ernest Wynants). Nervia stood out at the Salon of Ghent in 1933 and 1938 and successfully participated in the first Congrès Culturel Wallon held in Charleroi. Seven other exhibitions were organized between 1946 and 1978, including an itinerant exhibition on the occasion of the fiftieth anniversary of the Group's creation.

Nervia was also honored by a retrospective in the Art Museum of Mons in 2002.
