= Samrée =

Samrée Samreye (Walloon)
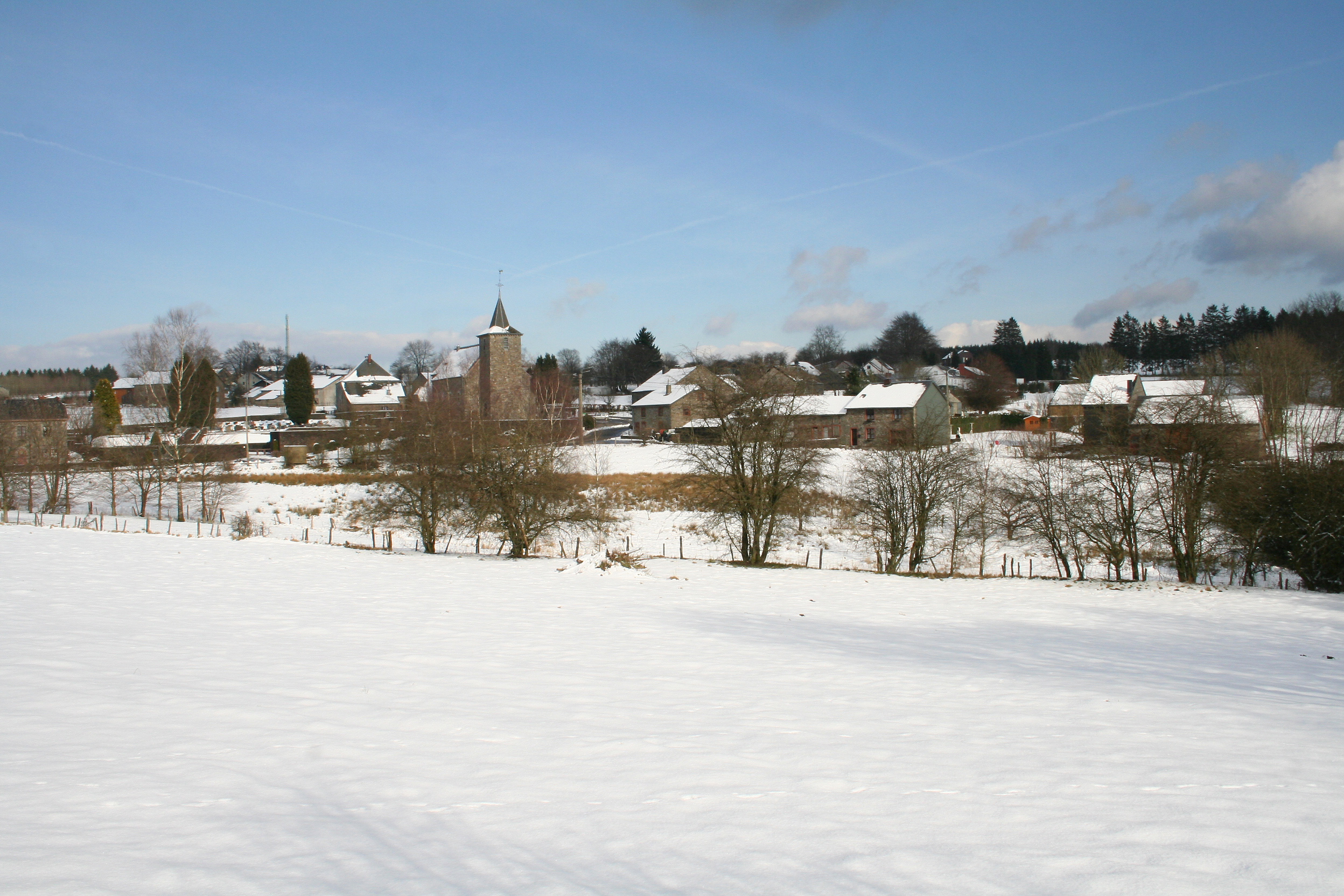
- Samrée

- Location in Belgium Samrée (Europe)
- Coordinates: 50°12′N 05°38′E
- Country: Belgium
- Region: Wallonia
- Province: Luxembourg
- Municipality: La Roche-en-Ardenne

Samrée (Walloon: Samreye) is a village of Wallonia and a district of the municipality of La Roche-en-Ardenne, located in the province of Luxembourg, Belgium..

Samrée is located at an altitude of between 540 metres (1,770 ft) and 600 metres (2,000 ft) above sea level. The village is bordered by woods. The village church dates from the 17th century and houses a wooden sculpture of Christ from the 16th century.

According to local legend, during the 19th century the village was used by the bandits Magonette et Géna as a refuge. An iron cross not far from the road from Samrée to Bérismenil commemorates sheep merchants massacred and robbed by brigands. Another cross along the same road commemorates loggers who used the woods to burn charcoal. The first cross-country skiing site established in the province of Luxembourg was in Samrée.
