= Arnaud Brihay =

Belgian artist

Arnaud Brihay is a Belgian artist, born in Marche-en-Famenne in 1972. He lives and works in Lyon, France.

== Solo exhibitions ==
2010

- "Privacy, from private intimacy to urban intimacies". Photography at Le Quai des Arts, Les Subsistences, Lyon.

2009

- "happiness_and_Bliss v1.0". Installation at Galerie Caroline Vachet, for the festival Nuit des Lumières, Lyon, France.

== Group exhibitions ==
2012

- Domination, Hegemony and The Panopticon. Works from The Farook Collection at Traffic Art Center, Dubai, UAE.

2011

- THE STATE: The Coming Insurrection at Traffic Art Center, Dubai, UAE. Curated by Rami Farook
- First Exhibition of European Contemporary Art of La Coupole - Paris, France.

2010

- "brussels is underground meets la providence all stars", photography installation and video, Belgium.
- "Picturing Cities", photography, at the Xuhui Museum of Art for the Universal Exhibition Shanghai 2010, China.
- "Summer Time", photography, at Galerie Caroline Vachet, Lyon, France.
- "Rouge!", photography, at the gallery Le Bocal, Lyon, France
- "Group Show", photography, at the IESA, Brussels, Belgium

=== Biennials ===
2010

- "US Today and after", photography, at the "9Ph Septembre de la Photographie", Photography Biennial 2010, Lyon, France.

2009

- "Wandering Around", photography, in Résonance of the Biennial of Contemporary Art of Lyon, France.

=== Art Fairs ===
2009

- Cutlog Art Fair, off FIAC, Paris, France

== Collections ==
- Belgian General Consulate, Shanghai, China
- ECNU School of Design, Shanghai, China
