= Frans Depooter =

Belgian painter (1898–1987)

- Born: 1898; Mons, Belgium
- Died: 1987 (aged 88–89); Havelange, Belgian Ardennes
- Known for: Painting
- Awards: Gold Medal at the Exposition des Arts Décoratifs (Art Déco) in Paris in 1925, Prize of the Académie Royale de Belgique in 1969, Gold Medal of the Mérite Artistique Européen

Frans Depooter, born in Mons, Belgium, in 1898, was a Belgian painter. He died in 1987 in Maffe (Havelange, Belgian Ardennes) at age 89.

Depooter began working at age 13 in his family's business (his father was a decorator in Mons), where he met Anto-Carte, Léon Navez, and Léon Devos. In 1928, Depooter, Anto-Carte, Navez, and Devos became co-founders of the Groupe Nervia.

In 1923, Frans Depooter married the painter Andrée Bosquet, taking painting courses at the Art Schools of Mons (E. Motte) and Brussels (Delville, Constant Montald) soon after. Recognized for his work, Depooter received several awards (among others: Gold Medal at the Exposition des Arts Décoratifs (Art Déco) in Paris in 1925, Prize of the Académie Royale de Belgique in 1969, Gold Medal of the Mérite Artistique Européen) and held the position of Director of the Molenbeek-Saint-Jean (Brussels) Art School from 1944 onwards.

A poet at heart, Frans Depooter deepened his consistently representational style in accordance with his nature. His stylized still lifes, expressionist landscapes, and portraits gave way very early to refined works of an apparent simplicity. His portraits on plain backgrounds isolate themselves in the model's dream or inner life. His flowers compose fragile and tender bouquets. His landscapes, often treated in half tints and transposed by a shaded light, testify to a discrete sensitivity (he was called the songster of the Brabant Wallon). Frans Depooter's talent displays a search for measure, refinement, and poetry.
