= Beausaint =

Beausaint Beassin (Walloon)
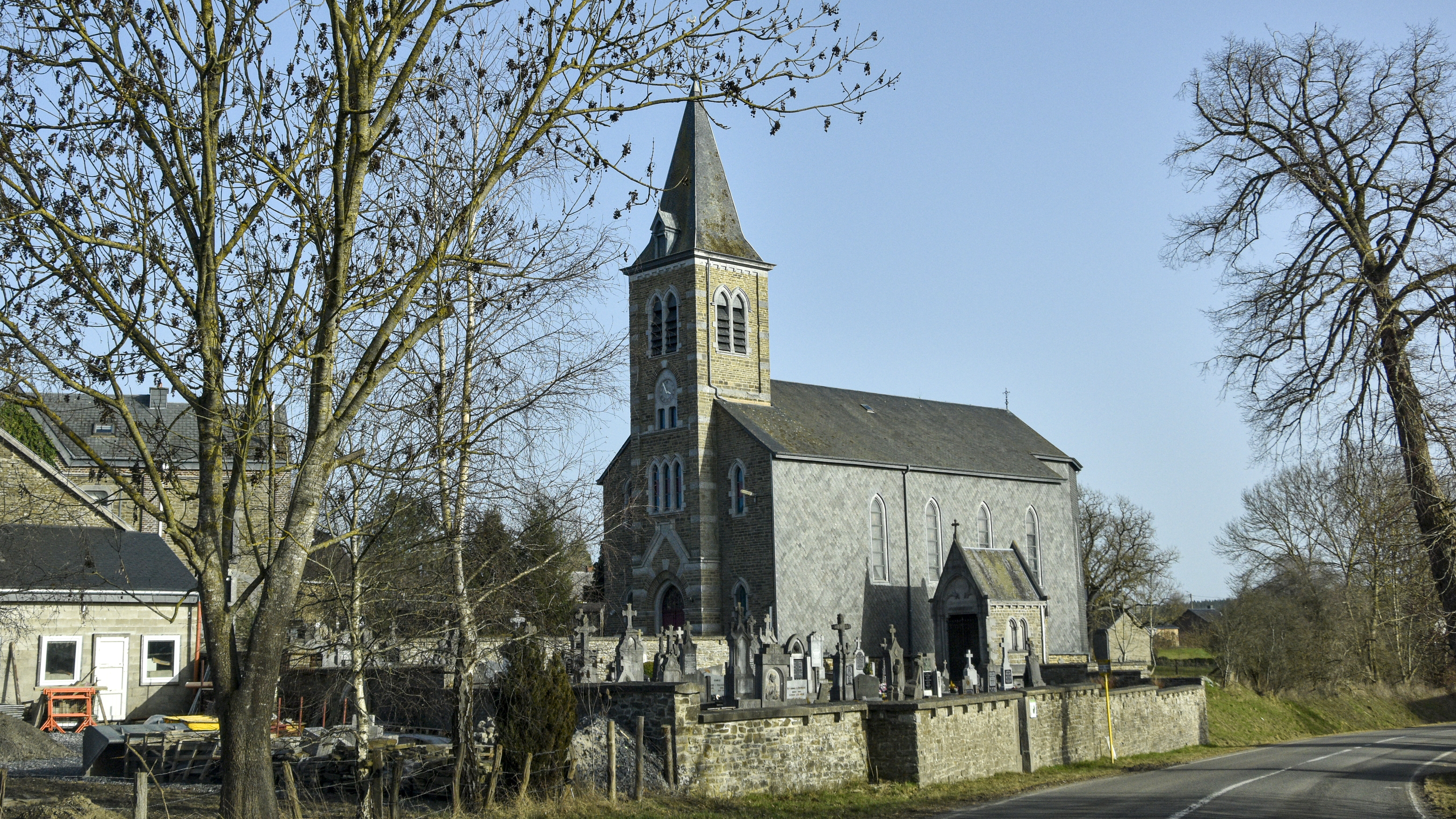
- Beausaint

- Location in Belgium Beausaint (Europe)
- Coordinates: 50°10′N 05°33′E
- Country: Belgium
- Region: Wallonia
- Province: Luxembourg
- Municipality: La Roche-en-Ardenne

Beausaint (Walloon: Beassin) is a village of Wallonia and a district of the municipality of La Roche-en-Ardenne, located in the province of Luxembourg, Belgium.

The present-day village is located where a Roman road connecting Trier with Bavay passed; around 50 graves from Roman times have been discovered in the village. According to local tradition, the village has been completely destroyed by fire and also suffered from the plague in historical times. The Château de Beausaint dates from the Middle Ages but was heavily damaged by warfare in the first half of the 17th century. It was later rebuilt but again largely destroyed at a later date, and today only one wing of the original castle remains.
