= Waha =

Coordinates: 50.2125°N 5.3431°E

Waha (French pronunciation: [wa.a]; Walloon: Wahå) is a village of Wallonia and a district of the municipality of Marche-en-Famenne, located in the province of Luxembourg, Belgium.

The village of Marloie is a part of the district.

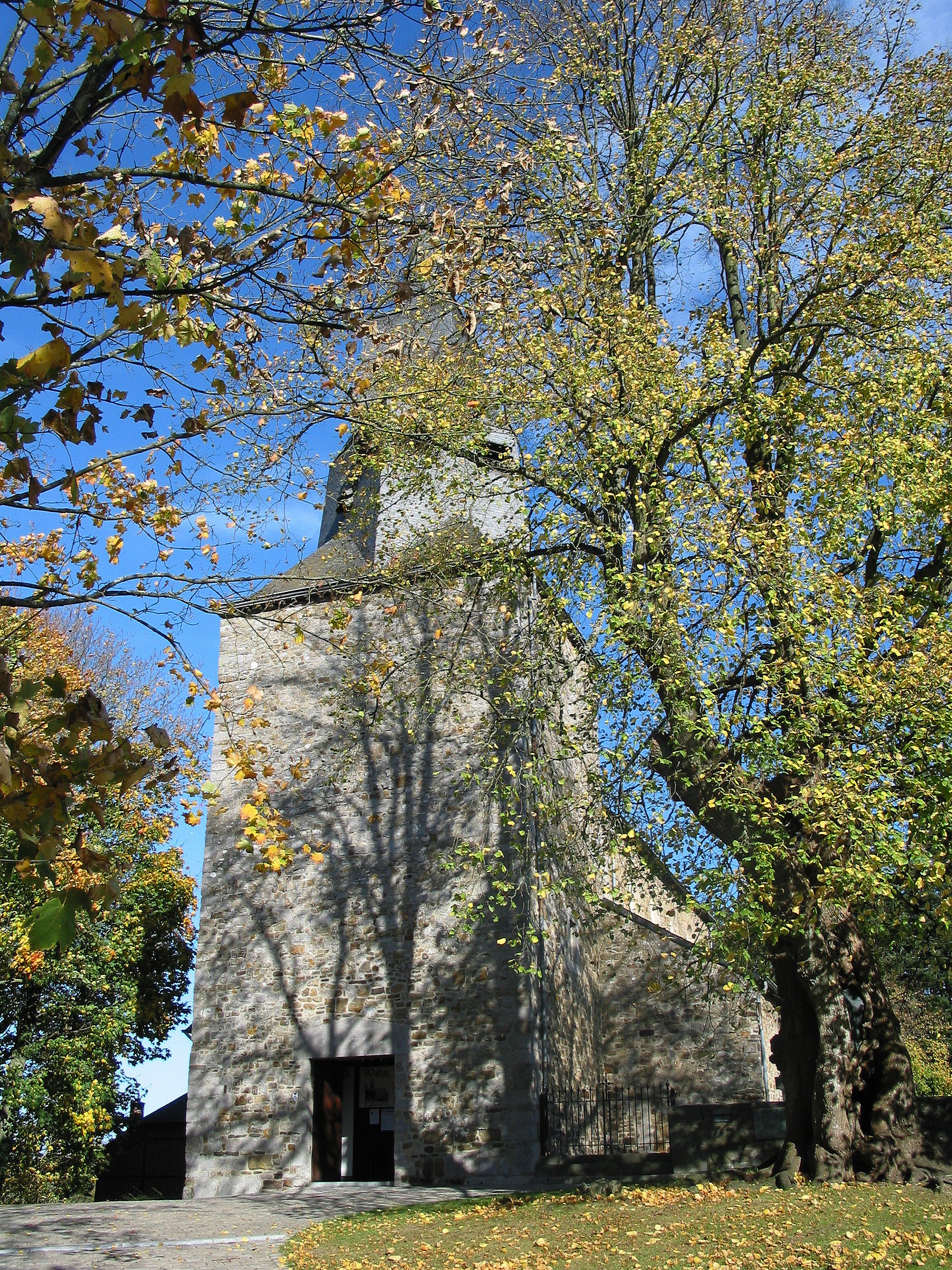
Waha, church tower St-Etienne

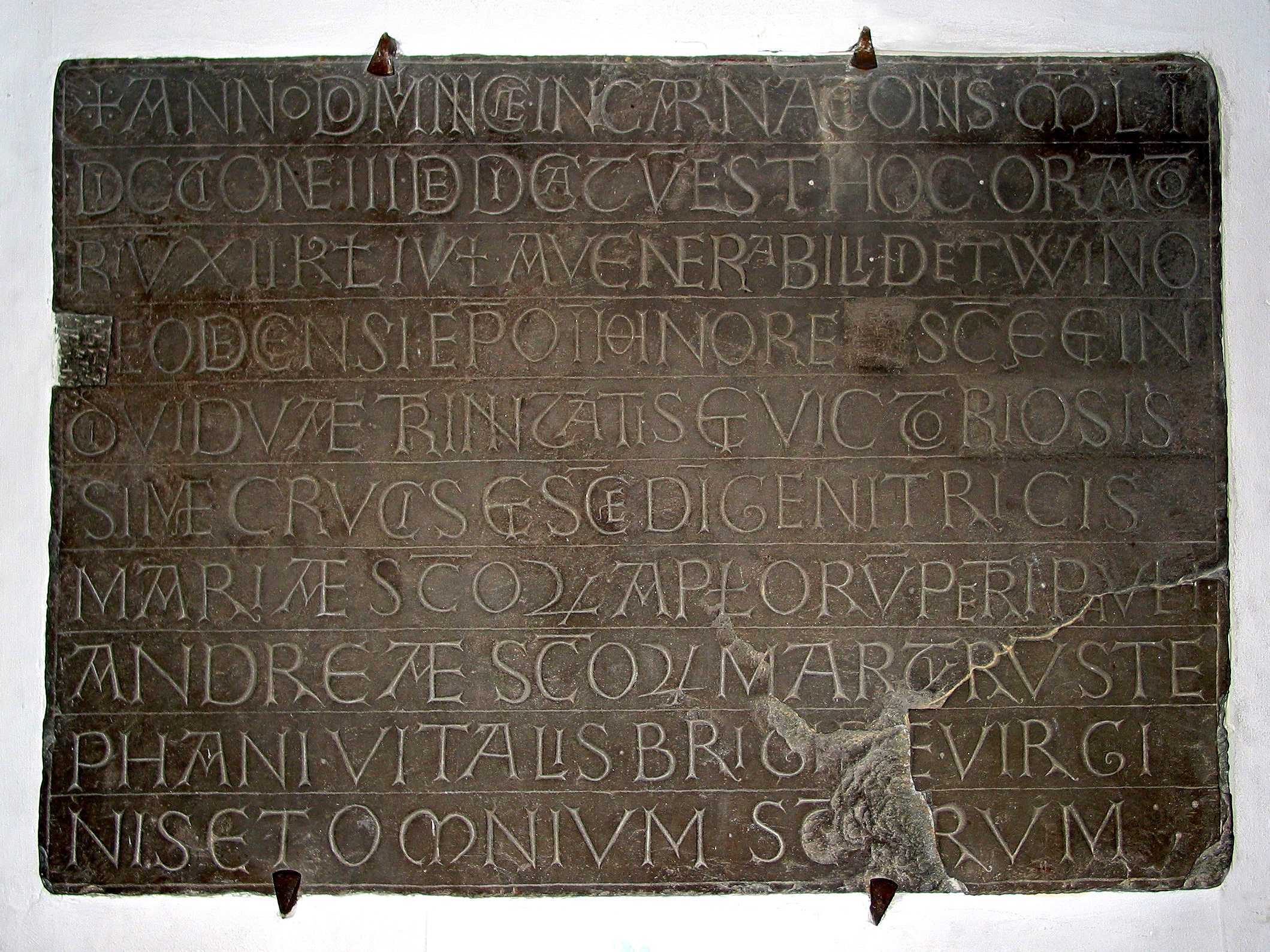
Dedicatory stone commemorating the consecration of St. Stephen's church by Theodwin of Liège on June 20, 1050

== Etymology ==
The name "Waha" comes from the Germanic proper name "Wachart". The Latin name of the location was "Wachardi mansus", meaning "Wachart's dwelling".

== History ==
Waha in the 10th century belonged to the territory of count Immon. The first church was built only 100 meters from the present church and was dedicated to Saint Martin of Tours. In 1050 the present church of Saint Étienne was dedicated by Theodwin, prince-bishop of Liège.

The collegiate chapter of Saint Étienne was dissolved during the time of the French First Republic.

== Art historical significance ==
The church of Saint Étienne in Waha is one of the oldest Romanesque churches in Belgium. The nave of the church is only four arches long. The choir has a rectangular shape and is unvaulted. It is also lower than the nave ceiling, which is not uncommon in early Mosan architecture. The westwork tower is slightly younger than the rest of the church.

In 1956-1957 the church underwent major restoration work as well as art historical investigation. It was then that the dedication stone from 1050 was found. There are also some sculptures by the Master of Waha in the church. The church's greatest treasure is the reliquary shrine of Saint Étienne.

== Gallery ==
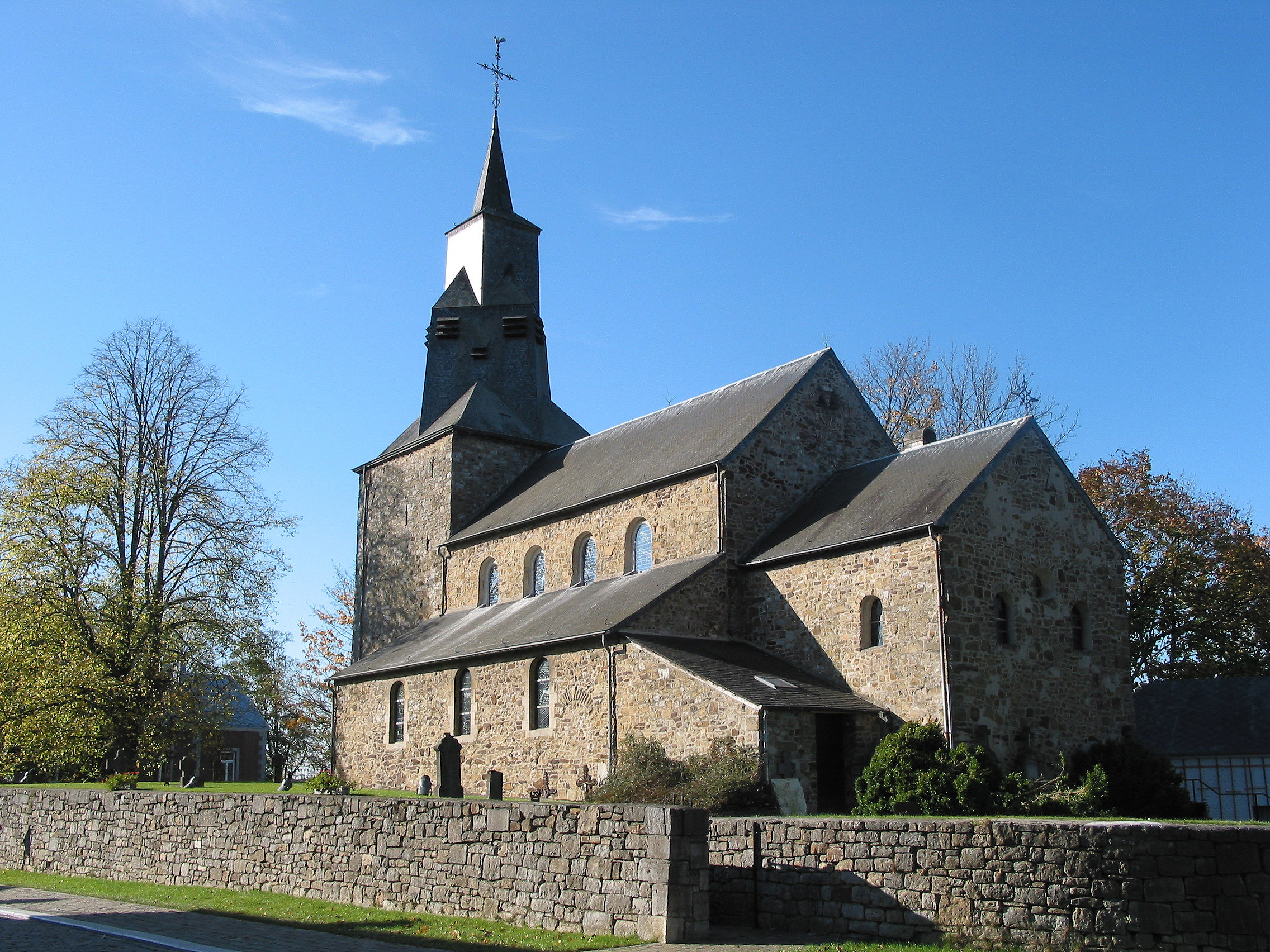
Saint-Etienne church

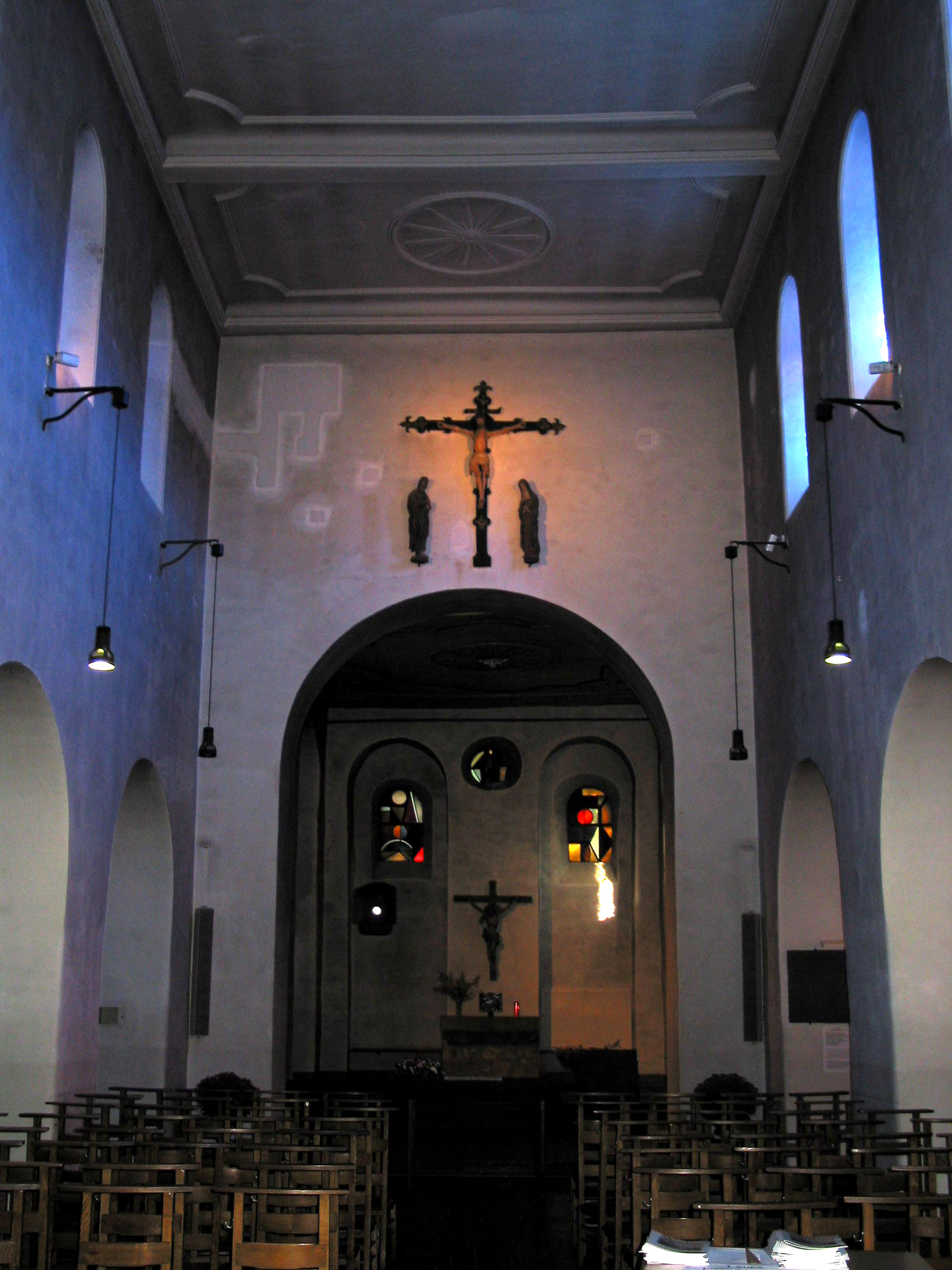
Church interior

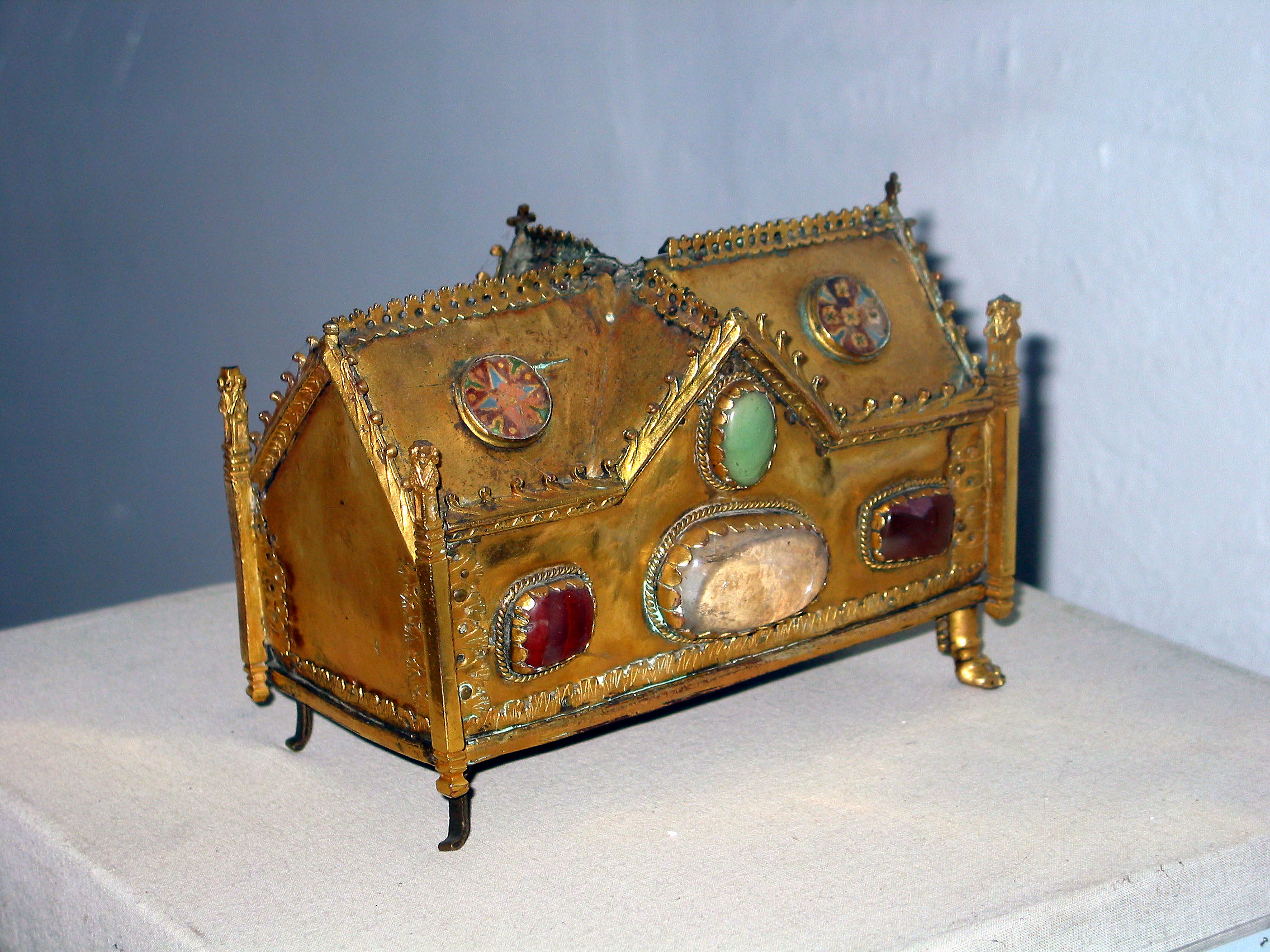
Reliquary shrine Saint-Étienne

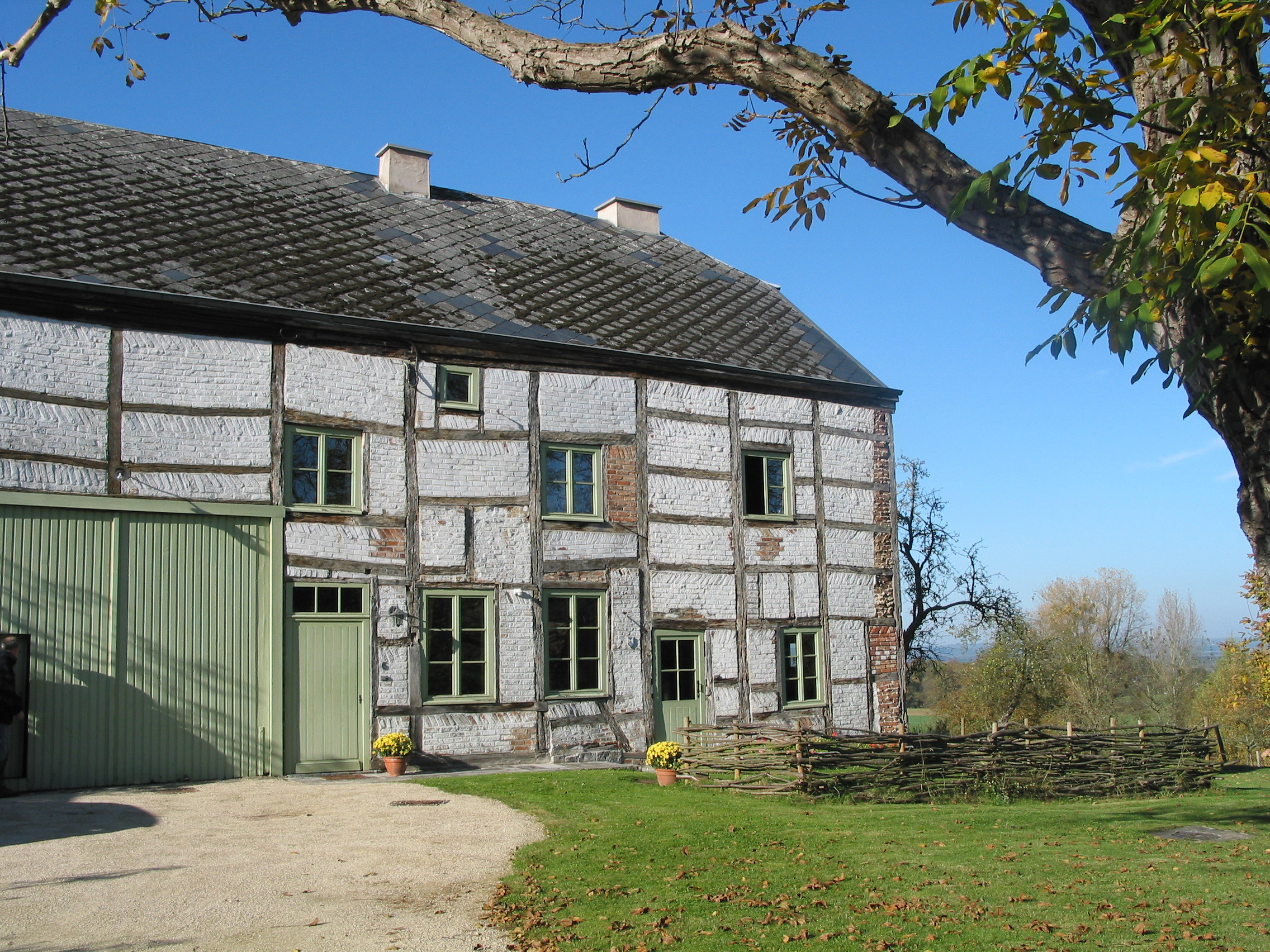
Timbered farmstead (18th century)
