= Mary Habsch =

Belgian painter and printmaker (1931–2023)

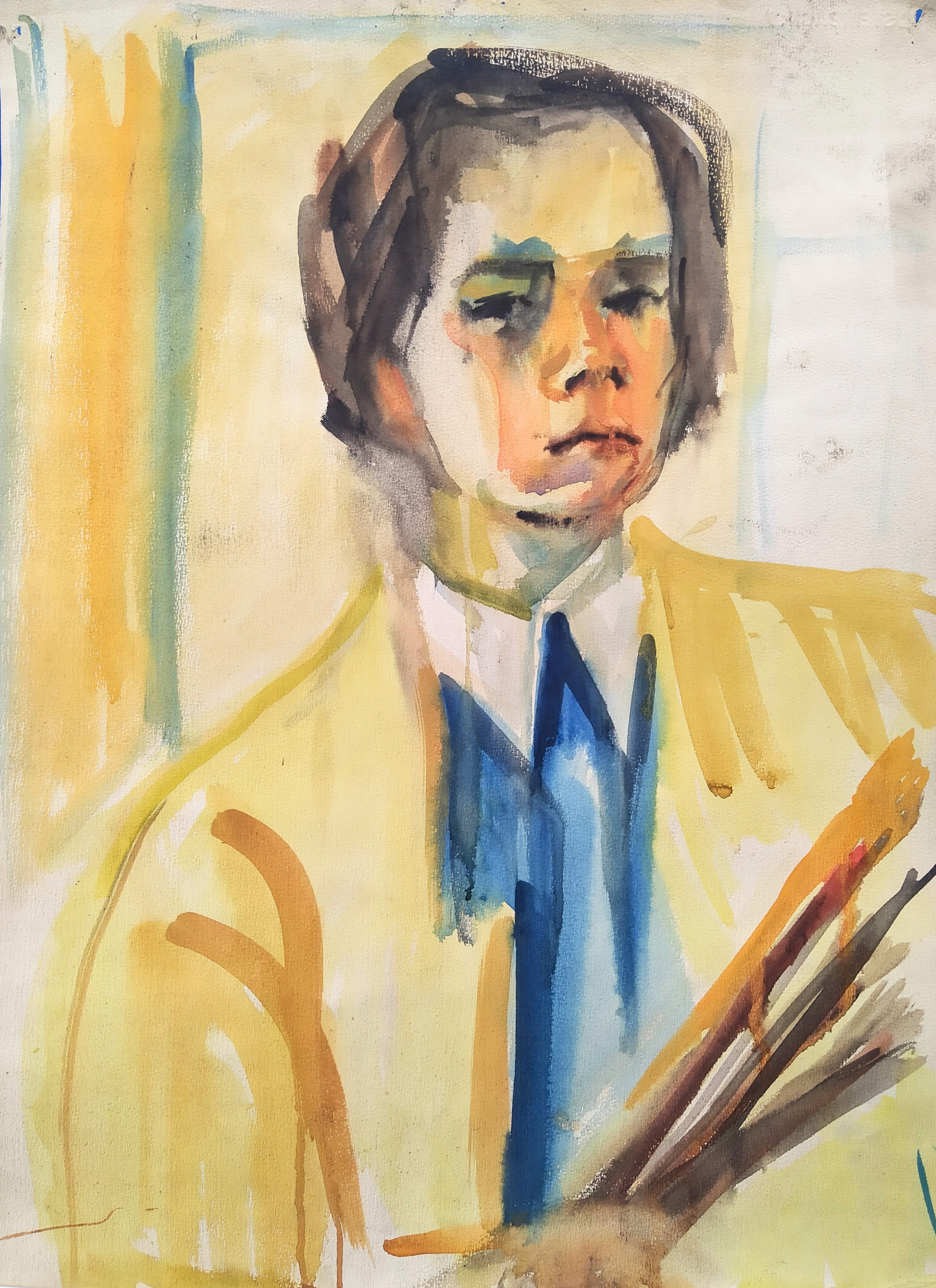
Self-portrait of Mary Habsch (b. 1931), ca. 1955, watercolor, 71.5x52 cm (28.15 x 20.47 in)

Mary Habsch (24 June 1931 – 11 December 2023) was a Belgian painter and printmaker.

== Biography ==
Mary Habsch was born in Welkenraedt in the Province of Liège, Belgium, on 24 June 1931.

From 1950 to 1959, she studied under Léon Devos at the Académie Royale des Beaux-Arts and graduated with a Master's Degree and Grand Distinction from the Higher Course of Painting after Nature and Composition.

Habsch died in Evere on 11 December 2023, at the age of 92.

== Work ==
Her work includes many portraits, esoteric landscapes, compositions of religious or biblical inspiration, but also large scenes paying tribute to the Belgian folklore.

Habsch participated in many artists' collectives, such as: The Royal Association of Professional Artists of Belgium (since 1973), the Gryday group (since 1977), The Association of Artists of the Commune of Forest (Brussels), The Friends of Thomas Owen, The Association "Les Amis du ça m'dit" (1996-1998), The Federation of Woman Artists of Belgium.

Her works are included in the national collection of Belgium: the Royal Museums of Fine Arts in Brussels owns "Vestaceram" (c. 1956) a diptic representing two woman workers in a ceramic factory, and "Tristesse" (c. 1960) a self-portrait of the artist with her father in a café of Vilvoorde. Mary Habsch has also works in the collections of the Brussels' city museum Maison du Roi, the Musée d'Ixelles and the Musée M of the University of Louvain-la-Neuve.
