= Grimbiémont =

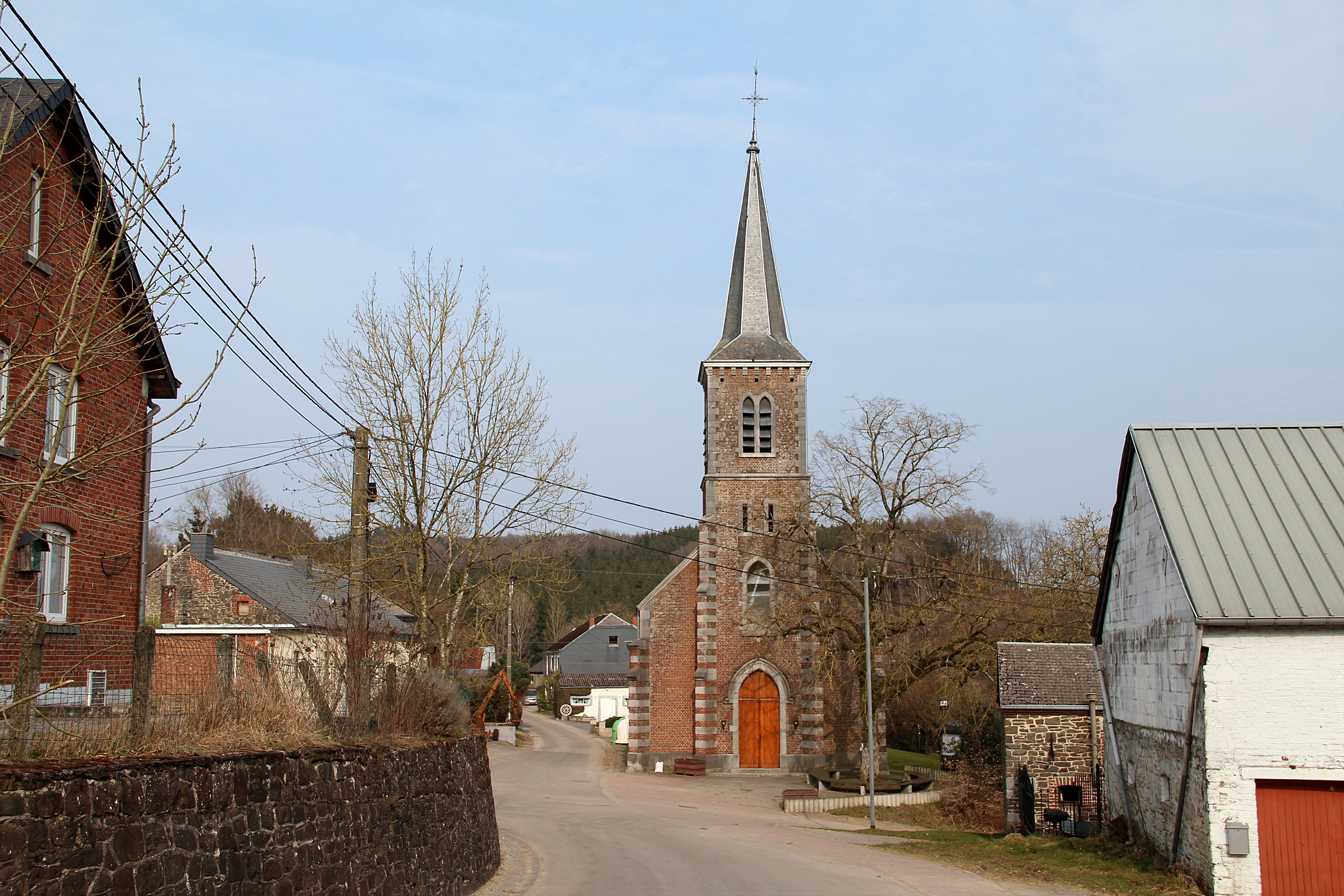
- Grimbiémont

- Location within Belgium Location within Europe
- Coordinates: 50°12′17″N 05°25′37″E
- Country: Belgium
- Region: Wallonia
- Province: Luxembourg
- Municipality: Marche-en-Famenne

Grimbiémont (French pronunciation: [ɡʁɛ̃bjemɔ̃]) is a village of Wallonia in the municipality of Marche-en-Famenne, district of Roy, located in the province of Luxembourg, Belgium.

The village was erected as a municipality in 1796. It was merged with Lignières in 1818, this new municipality itself merged with Roy in 1823.

Grimbiémont is located at an altitude of 340 metres (1,120 ft) above sea level. The village consists of several farms from the 18th and 19th centuries.
