= Marche-en-Famenne =

City in Wallonia, Belgium

Marche-en-Famenne Måtche-el-Fåmene (Walloon)
- City and municipality
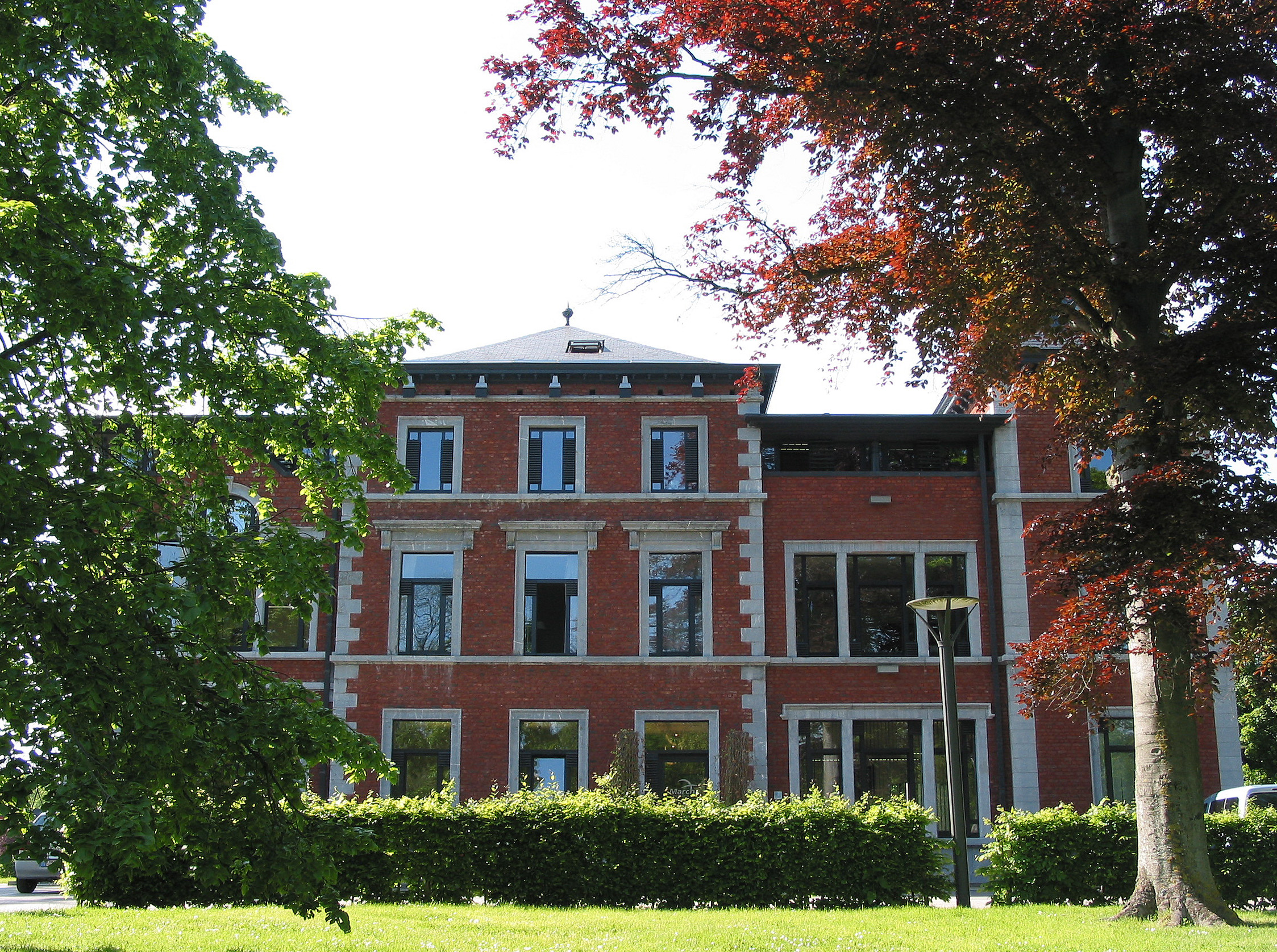
- City hall

- Flag Coat of arms

- Location of Marche-en-Famenne in Luxembourg province
- Interactive map of Marche-en-Famenne
- Location in Belgium
- Coordinates: 50°13′N 05°20′E
- Country: Belgium
- Community: French Community
- Region: Wallonia
- Province: Luxembourg
- Arrondissement: Marche-en-Famenne

Government
  - Mayor: Nicolas Grégoire
  - Governing party: Mayeur cdH - PS

Area
  - Total: 122.07 km^{2} (47.13 sq mi)

Population (2018-01-01)
  - Total: 17,455
  - Density: 142.99/km^{2} (370.35/sq mi)
- Postal codes: 6900
- NIS code: 83034
- Area codes: 084
- Website: www.marche.be

Marche-en-Famenne (French pronunciation: [maʁʃ ɑ̃ famɛn]; Walloon: Måtche-el-Fåmene [mɑːtʃ ɛl fɑːmɛn]; literally "Marche in Famenne") is a city and municipality of Wallonia located in the Belgian province of Luxembourg.

The municipality consists of the following districts: Aye, Hargimont, Humain, Marche-en-Famenne, On, Roy, and Waha.

Other population centres include Grimbiémont, Hollogne, Lignières, Marloie, and Verdenne.

== History ==
=== Middle Ages ===
In the early Middle Ages, Marche was just a little hamlet on the Marchette brook, one of the dependencies of the nearby Abbey of Stavelot. In the 12th century, this territory was made part of the County of La Roche. It was ideally located, on the main road between Namur and Luxembourg City, and quickly evolved into a town, which obtained its charter in the 13th century. At the end of the century, in true medieval fashion, it acquired a complete system of defensive walls, with two gates, a series of watchtowers, and a keep. The market place and religious organizations, such as the Carmes convent founded in 1473, could thrive inside the closed city.

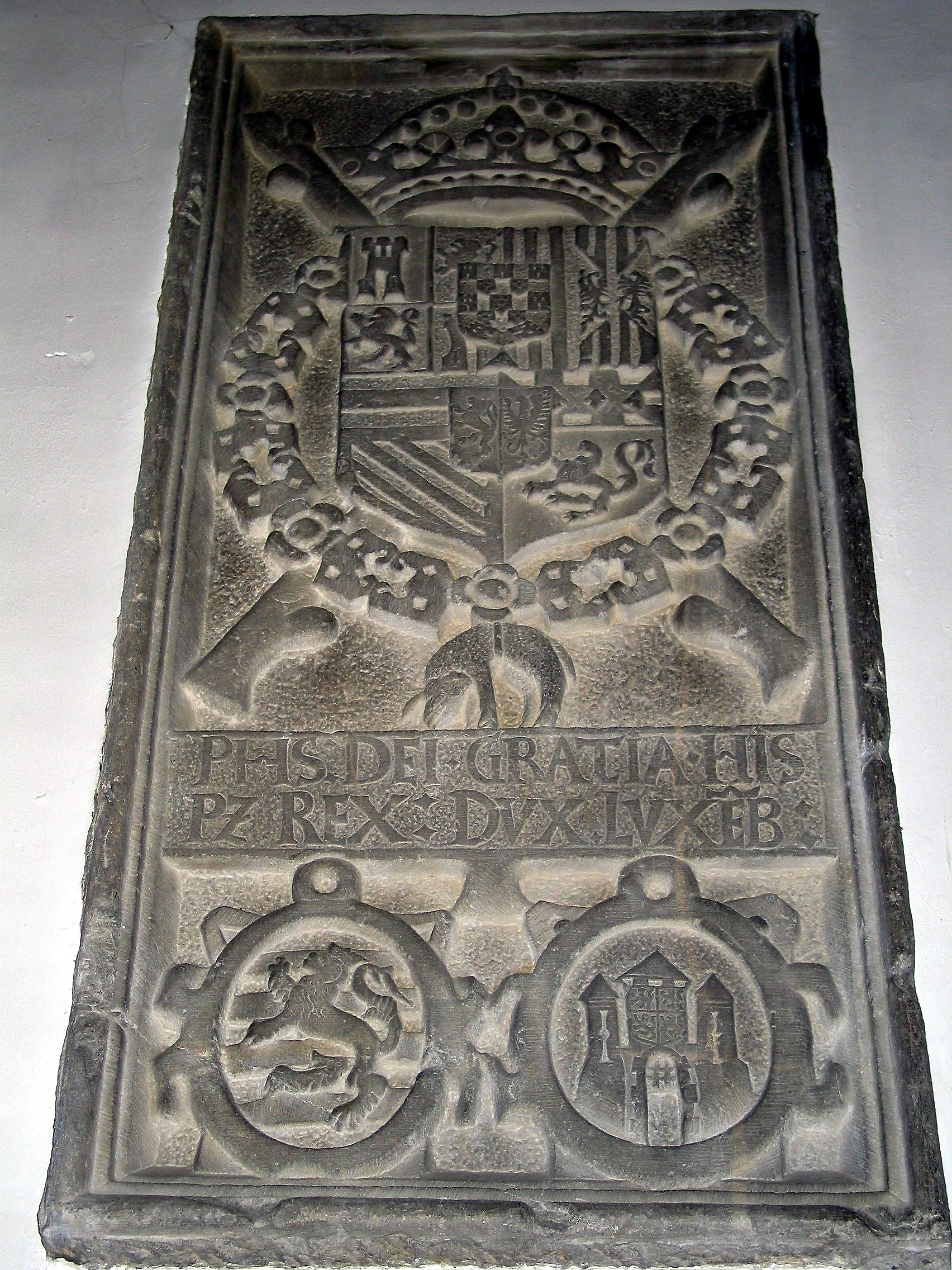
Commemorative stone Perpetual Edict (1577)

=== After 1500 ===
When in 1555 Philip II of Spain, son of Charles V, inherited his father's empire, the freedoms of Spain's Seventeen Provinces to the north were reduced considerably, giving rise to the Eighty Years' War. In the aftermath of the Pacification of Ghent, Don John of Austria, Philip II's half brother, granted the Perpetual Edict, which was signed in the city in February 1577. The edict allowed for the departure of the Spanish troops and recognized most of the city's freedoms, with the notable exception of religion. The war started again and Don John died a year later near Namur.

The castle and defensive walls were dismantled at the end of the 17th century on the orders of Louis XIV. A century later, the French Revolutionary troops entered the city and closed the convent. Fighting occurred in and around Marche in December 1944 as part of the Battle of the Bulge, the last major German offensive in West during World War II. Today, with its schools, light industries, military complex, and tourist attractions, Marche is a vibrant regional centre.

== Sights ==
- The city centre includes a few interesting buildings, such as the St Remacle church and the old Carmes convent.
- The city is the home of several museums, including a lace museum, which is housed in one of the last remnants of the city's medieval walls and commemorates the hundreds of lace workers that lived in the Marche area in the 18th century.
- The Famenne museum gives a good overview of the region's art and history.
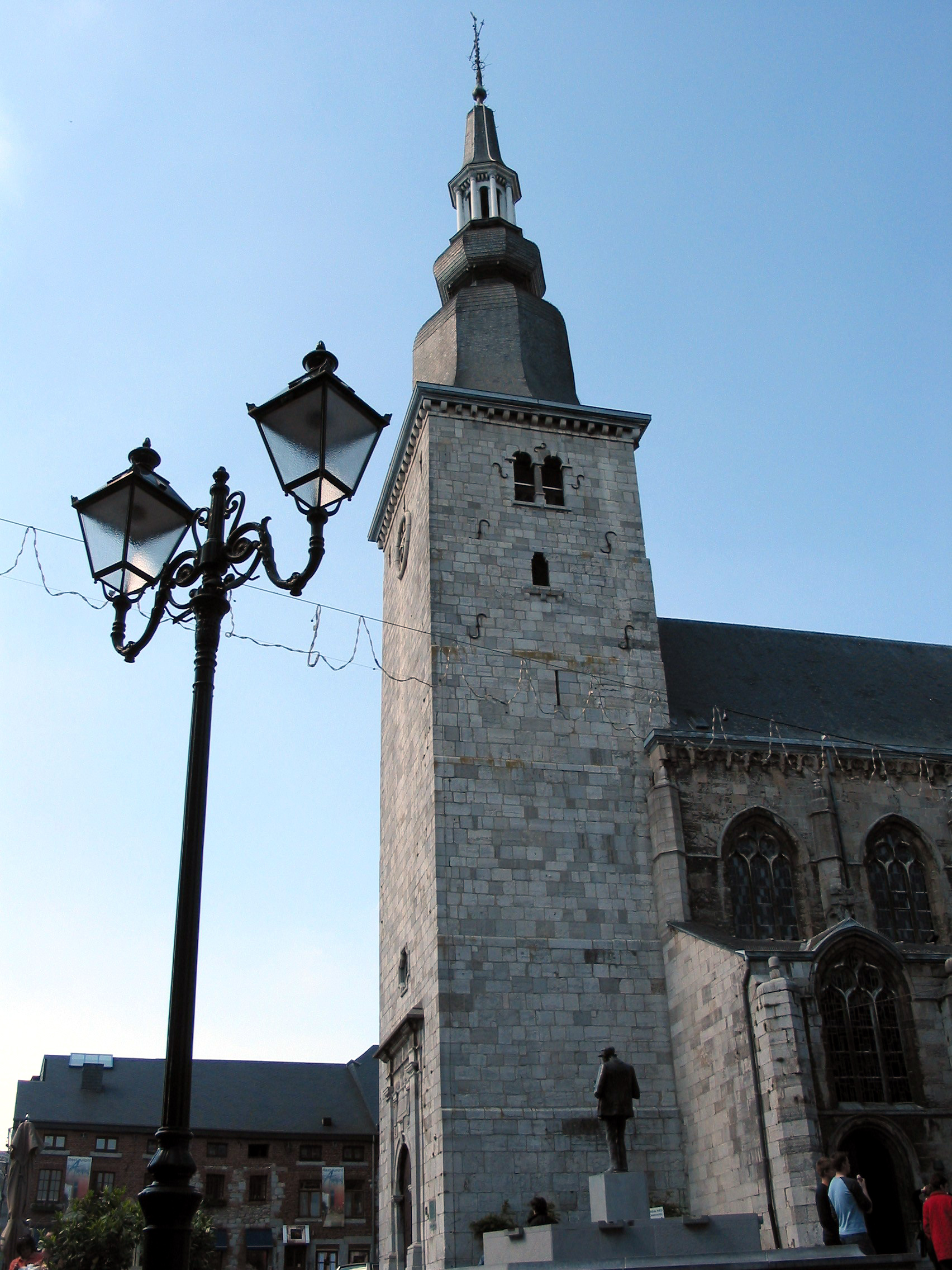
Church of St Remacle

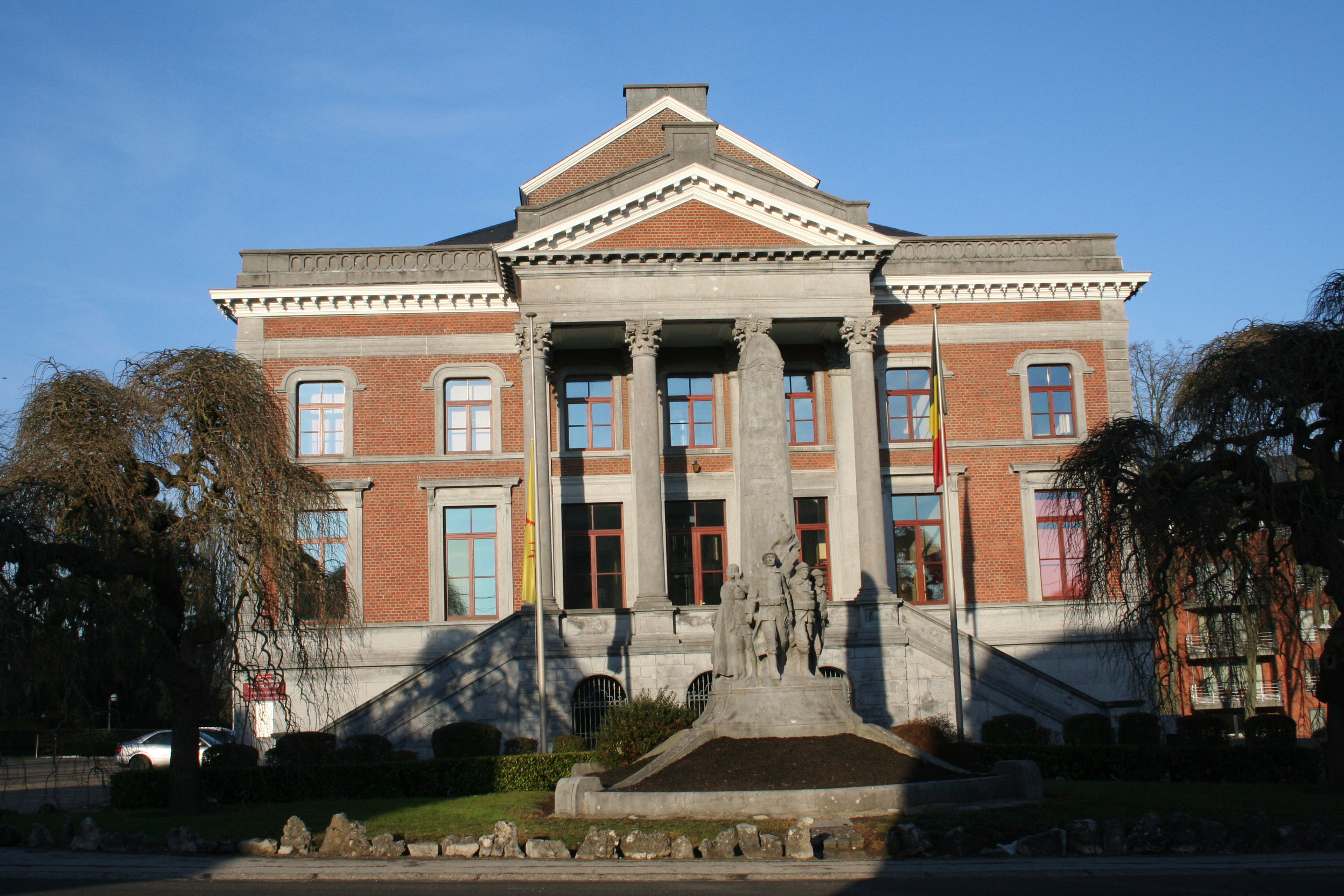
The law courts

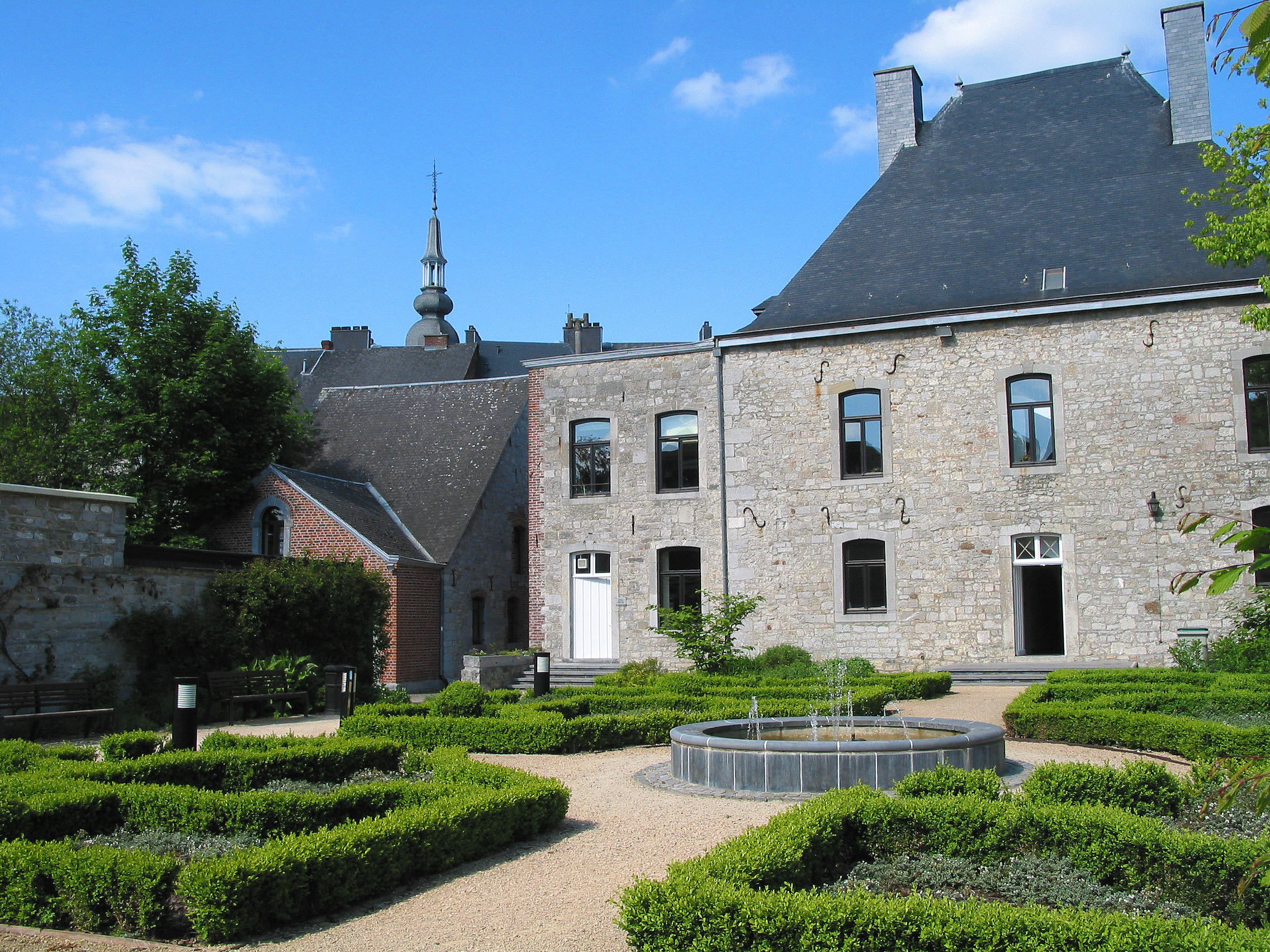
The Jadot park

== Festivities ==
- The Grosse Biesse (Great Beast) carnival takes place every year in February. It features the beast, as well as the city's mascot Gugusse, traditional giants, and several other groups of joyful characters.
- A folkloric group called La Plovinette (Fine Drizzle) specializes in traditional Walloon dancing.

== Demographics ==
Group of origin	Year		Year		Year		Year	
Group of origin	2000		2010		2020		2026	
Group of origin	Number	%	Number	%	Number	%	Number	%
Belgians with Belgian background	14,655	89,4	14,658	85,3	14,426	82	14,166	78,7
Belgians with foreign background	1,080	6,6	1,942	11,3	2,435	13,8	2,832	15,7
Neighboring country	332	2,02	462	2,69	524	2,98	588	3,26
EU27 (excluding neighboring country)	339	2,06	485	2,82	606	3,4	671	3,72
Outside EU 27	409	2,49	995	5,79	1,305	7,4	1,573	8,73
Non-Belgians	655	4	575	2,4	730	4,2	1,009	5,6
Neighboring country	173	1,05	158	0,91	189	1,07	209	1,16
EU27 (excluding neighboring country)	140	0;85	208	1,21	235	1,33	235	1,30
Outside EU 27	342	2,08	209	1,21	306	1,74	565	3,13
Total	16,390	100	17,175	100	17,591	100	18,007	100

== Notable people from Marche-en-Famenne ==
- Pierre Bailly, Belgian comics artist
- Jacques Beurlet, football player
- André Bouchat, politician
- Arnaud Brihay, Belgian artist
- Dany, Belgian comics artist
- Frans Depooter, Belgian painter
- Willy Deweert, Belgian writer
- Benoît Feroumont, Belgian comics artist
- Charles Hanin, politician
- Marie-Louise Hénin, member of the Belgian Resistance
- Jean Jadot, Belgian engineer
- Joseph Nusbaum, Belgian architect
- Brigitte Olivier, Belgian judoka
- Phil, Belgian comics artist
- Luc Templier, writer
