= Orthos =

Orthos can refer to:

- Orthos (skipper), a genus of butterfly in the grass skipper family
- Orthos (Thessaly), a city of ancient Thessaly, Greece
- A two-headed dog in Greek mythology, also known as Orthrus

== See also ==
- Orthros, the matins service in Eastern Christianity
