= Louis Buisseret =

Belgian painter, draftsman and engraver (1888–1956)

Louis Buisseret (1888–1956) was a Belgian painter, draftsman and engraver. His style of art mainly focused on realistic portraits, nudes, and still life. Works by Buisseret can be found in museums in Belgium, Barcelona, Madrid, Riga, and Indianapolis.

== Biography ==
Buisseret was born in Binche, Hainaut, Belgian in 1888. His parent had encouraged him to study art when he was a child. At age 16, Buisseret studied engraving at the Art Academy of Mons (Note: The Art Academy of Mons is also called Académie in Mons.) under Louis Joseph Greuse. In 1908, he studied at the Royal Academy of Fine Arts in Brussels (Note: The academy is also called Brussels Academy or Académie Royale des Beaux-Arts.) under Jean Delville, a mentor who heavily influenced Buisseret’s later work. After completing the training at Brussel Academy, Bruisseret traveled to Italy with his father to study the works of Italian artists of the Quattrocento and Cinquecento.

In 1920, Buisseret actively participated in leading salons and gallery exhibits in Belgium. In 1922, he married Emilie Empain, who often acted as a model for him. Buisseret's work was exhibited at the Carnegie Institute, Pittsburgh in 1926. In 1928, Buisseret’s work was rejected by the Salon of La Louviere for its obscene character. This incident led to the establishment of Nervia, a group of artists, by Buisseret, Anto Carte, and Leon Eeckman, who supported promising young artists.

In 1929, Buisseret was appointed as director of the Art Academy of Bergen, where he held the position for 20 years.

== Auction ==
Buisseret's work has been offered at auction multiple times. The record price for Buisseret at auction is $17,795 USD for an artwork titled Portrait of Mrs Homer Saint-Gaudens sold in 2008.

== Awards ==
- 1910, second prize in the Belgian Prix de Rome painting competition
- 1911, first prize in the Belgian Prix de Rome engraving competition
- 1929, silver medal at the Salon of Barcelona
