= Fernand Wéry =

Belgian painter

- Born: 1886; Ixelles, Belgium
- Died: 20 August 1964 (aged 77–78); Watermael-Boitsfort, Belgium
- Occupation: Painter

Fernand Wéry (1886, Ixelles – 20 August 1964, Watermael-Boitsfort) was a Belgian painter. His work was part of the painting event in the art competition at the 1936 Summer Olympics.
