= Orthos (Thessaly) =

Town and polis (city-state) in ancient Thessaly

- Όρθος (Greek)
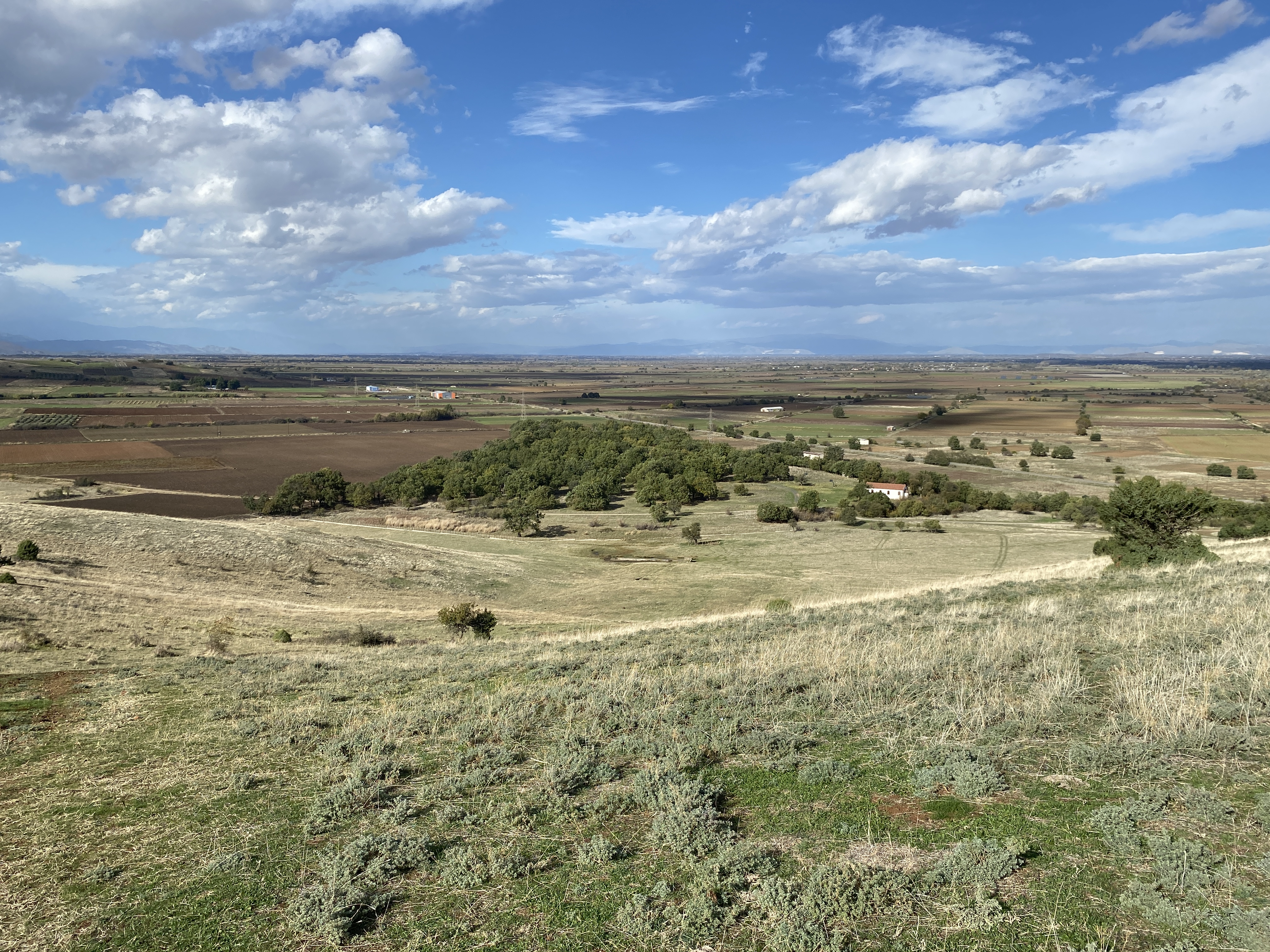
- The site of ancient Orthos next to the village of Kedros, Thessaly. In the background the western Thessalian plain and Mount Olympus.

- Location within Greece
- 39°13′07″N 22°02′05″E
- Type: Ancient Greek city (polis)
- Cultures: Ancient Greece
- Location: Kedros, Karditsa, Greece
- Region: Thessaly

Site notes
- Archaeologists: Babis Intzesiloglou, Christos Karagiannopoulos
- Discovered: 1905
- Owner: Hellenic Republic
- Management: Ministry of Culture and Sports
- Website: "Αρχαία Όρθη". Odysseus. Ministry of Culture and Sports, Hellenic Republic. 2012.

Orthos (Ancient Greek: Ὄρθος, Ὄρθοι, or Ὄρθα) was a city and polis (city-state) in Hellenistic ancient Thessaly.

The city appears in epigraphic texts dated to the 4th century BCE. In an inscription at Delphi of the year 341/0 BCE the name appears in genitive form (Ὄρθου). A late Hellenistic stamped roof tile found at the site of the ancient city bears the inscription [Ο]ΡΘΙΕΩ[Ν] ("of the Orthieians"), and a now-lost inscription of the 170s BCE provides evidence for an agoranomos of the Orthieians . In addition, bronze coins of Orthos dated between the 4th and 2nd centuries BCE are preserved with the legends «ΟΡΘΙ», «ΟΡΘΙΕΩΝ» and «ΟΡΘΙΕΙΩΝ». The city's name appears in a list of theorodokoi at Delphi dated to c. 230-220 BCE. Whether the community is the same as the Orthe known from the Homeric Catalogue of Ships in the Iliad is unknown but appears probable due to the similarities in name.

The archaeological site of Orthos is located at the Agios Nikolaos location just northwest of the village of Kedros (formerly Chalambrezi), some 17 km southeast of the regional capital of Karditsa. Much of the site is municipal property, but a substantial part is covered by privately owned cotton fields. The remains were discovered in 1905 during road construction work, during which the ancient fortification walls were completely robbed of their stone to be used as construction material in the new road.

Inscriptions of the Hellenistic and Roman periods have been discovered at the site, as well as the remains of a Hellenistic pottery workshop. The finds from the latter are exhibited in the Archaeological Museum of Karditsa. A sanctuary of a Chthonic deity (possibly Persephone) with a temple in antis has been excavated in the extensive northeastern cemeteries of the city, yielding a wealth of ceramic votive figurines.

The Archaic and Classical predecessor of Hellenistic Orthos was probably at the site of Kalathia near the village of Filia, circa 5 km northeast of the city site. Here, a larger settlement has been excavated during the construction of the new E65 highway, with several phases of habitation spanning until the mid-4th century BC.
