= La Roche-en-Ardenne Castle =

Castle in Wallonia, Belgium

- Château de La Roche-en-Ardenne
- La Roche-en-Ardenne, Province of Luxembourg, Wallonia
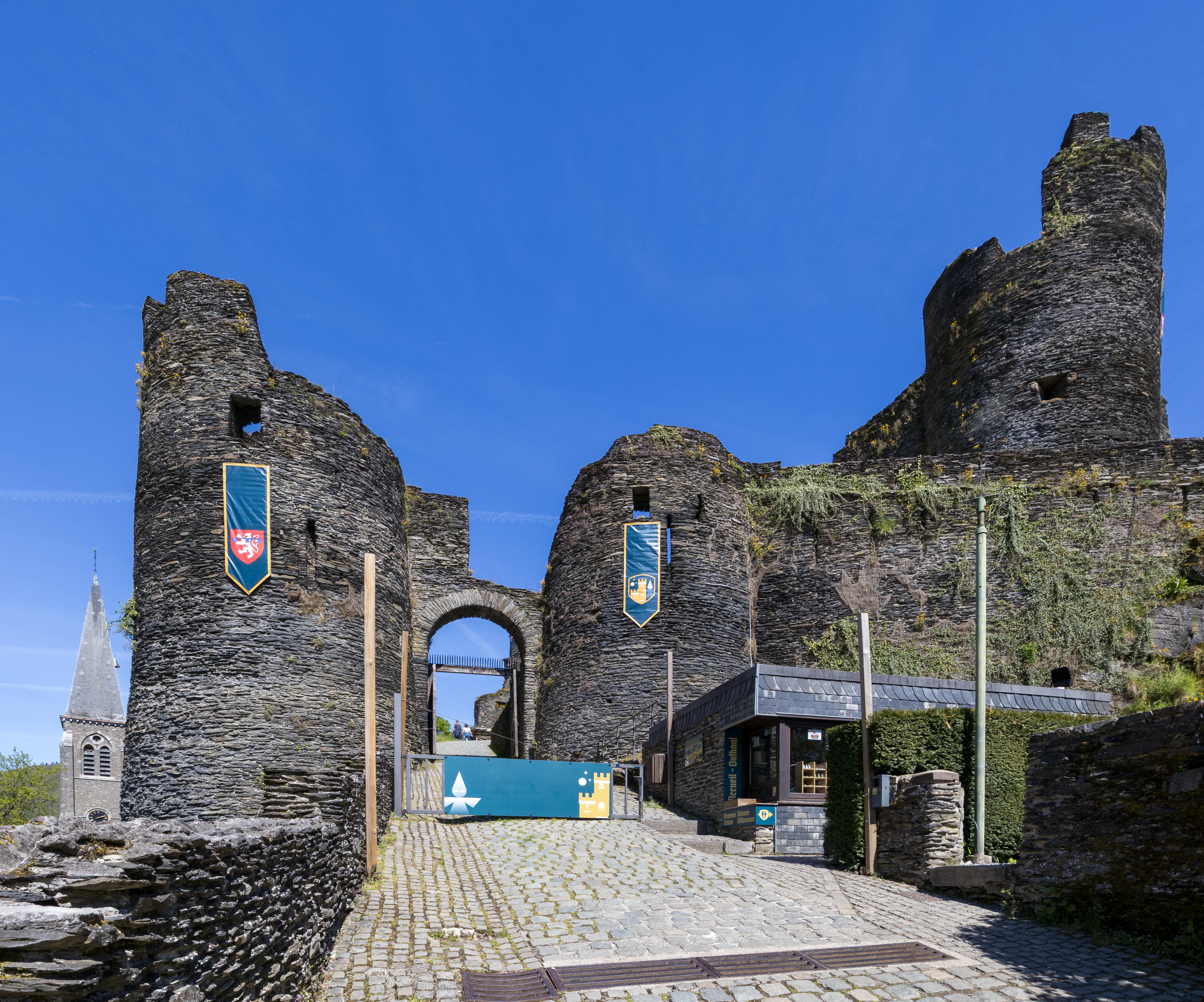
- The entrance

Site information
- Type: Castle
- Condition: Ruined

Location
- Location within Belgium
- Coordinates: 50.18198°N 5.57649°E

La Roche-en-Ardenne Castle (French: Château de La Roche-en-Ardenne) is a ruined medieval castle near La Roche-en-Ardenne in the province of Luxembourg, Wallonia, Belgium. Located on a rocky ridge overlooking a loop of the Ourthe river, its origins go back to a Celtic oppidum.

== History ==
The castle was built on the ruins of a Celtic oppidum, on a site where human presence dates back to Neolithic times. The Romans later established a fortified camp there. In the early eighth century, Pepin Landen built a villa on the site.

The first castle was built in 844 (approximately) by Adelard, Count of La Roche. After the death of Henri de la Roche in 1152, the countship passed to Henri the Blind Count of Namur, and upon his death in 1196, to his daughter Ermesinde of Luxembourg and thus to the line of the counts of Luxembourg.

In the 14th century, the inhabitants of La Roche were authorized by Jean the Blind, count of Luxembourg, to protect their city by a wall and towers that strengthened the defensive system of the castle.

The strategic importance of the castle did not escape Louis XIV. From 1681 to 1688, he had a student of Vauban reinforce the structures. However, these improvements did not benefit him much since the castle was taken by the winners of the War of Succession of Spain and they neglected it little by little.

The misfortunes of the castle continued in 1721, when it was badly damaged by a fire caused by lightning. Joseph II of Austria then dismantled it. It was the prey of vandals in the nineteenth century, and it also was damaged in the bombing of December 1944 during the Battle of the Bulge.

Fortunately for history and architecture enthusiasts, the ruins of the castle of La Roche-en-Ardenne still constitute today a beautiful example of military architecture throughout the ages.

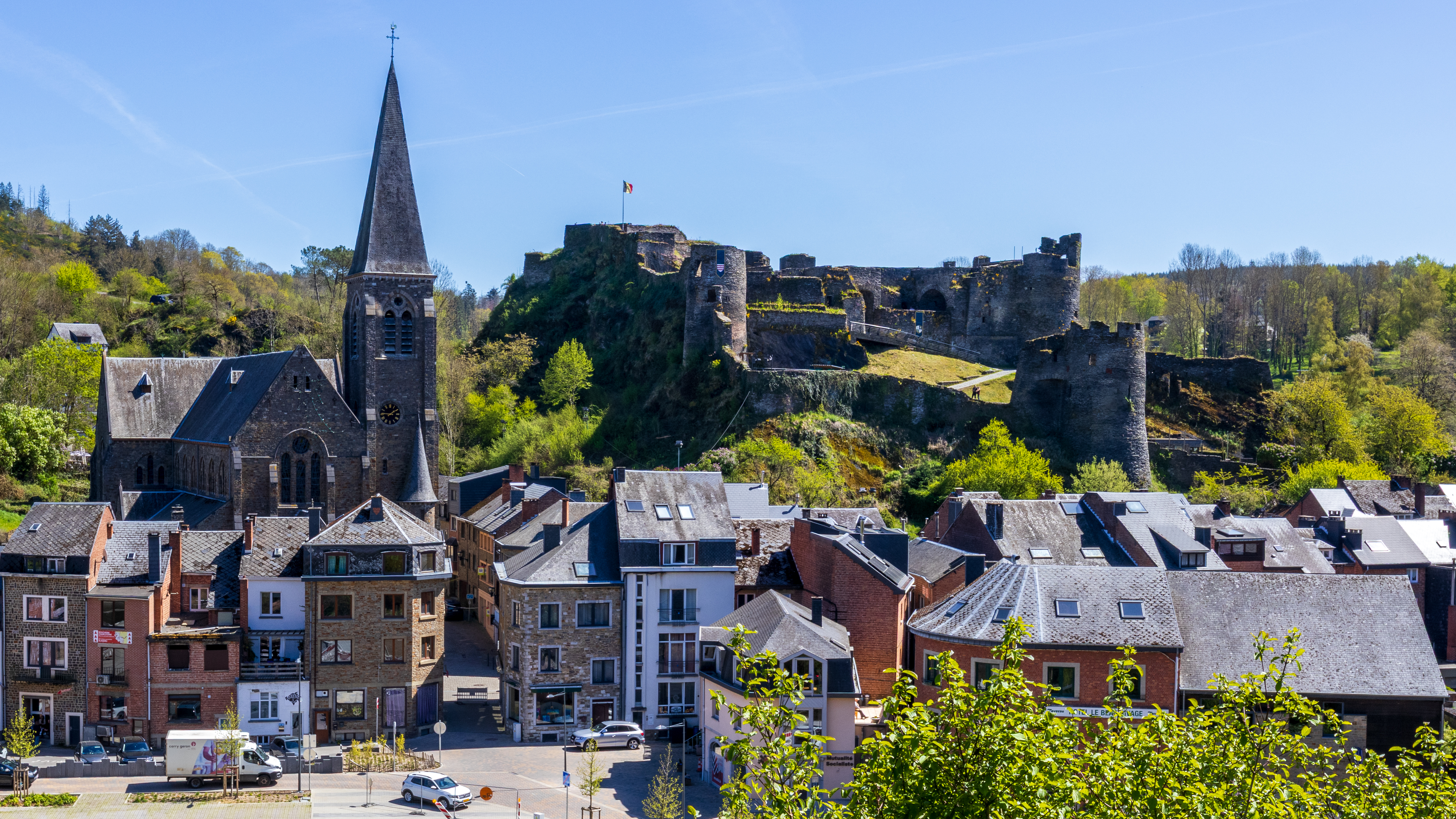

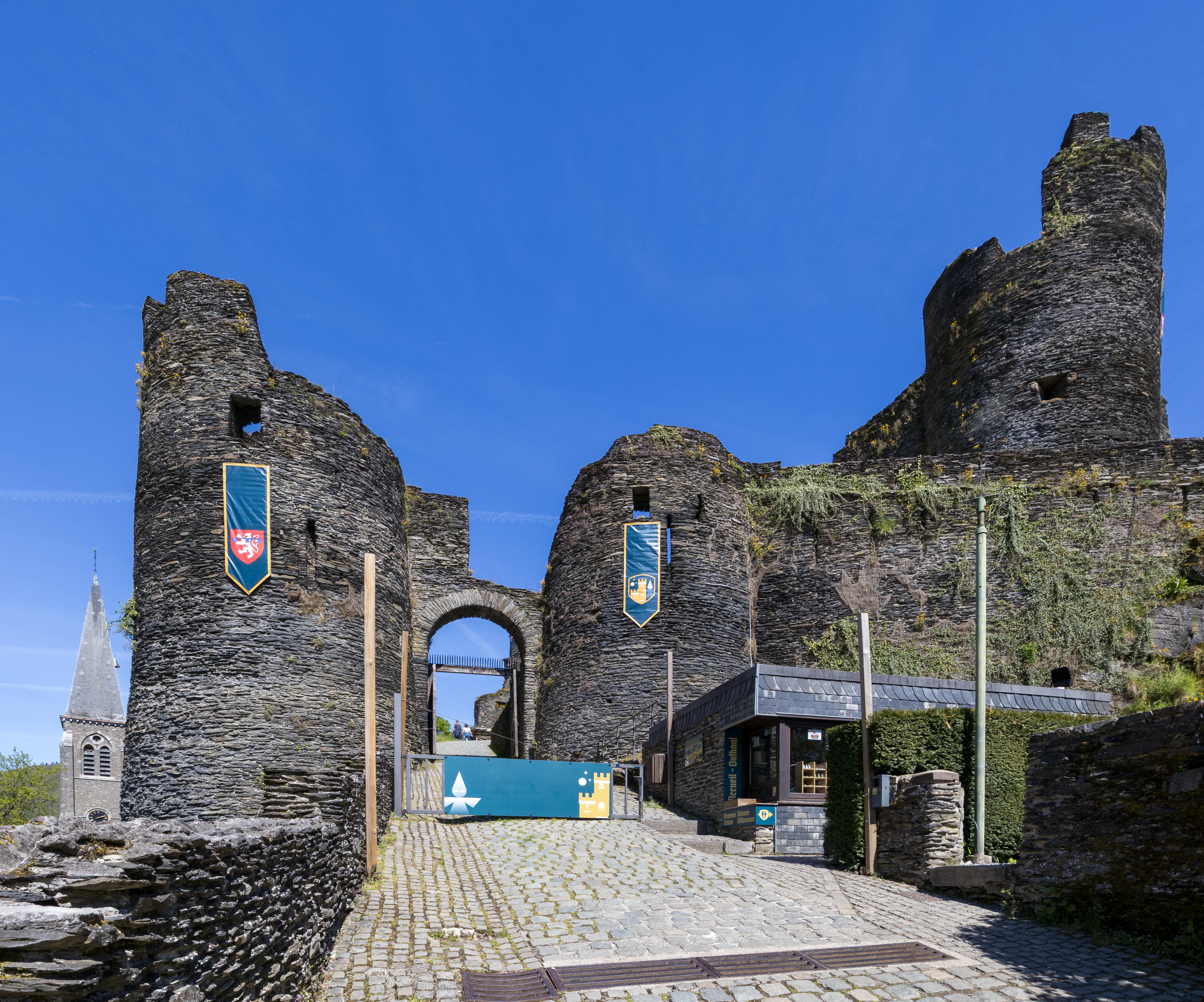

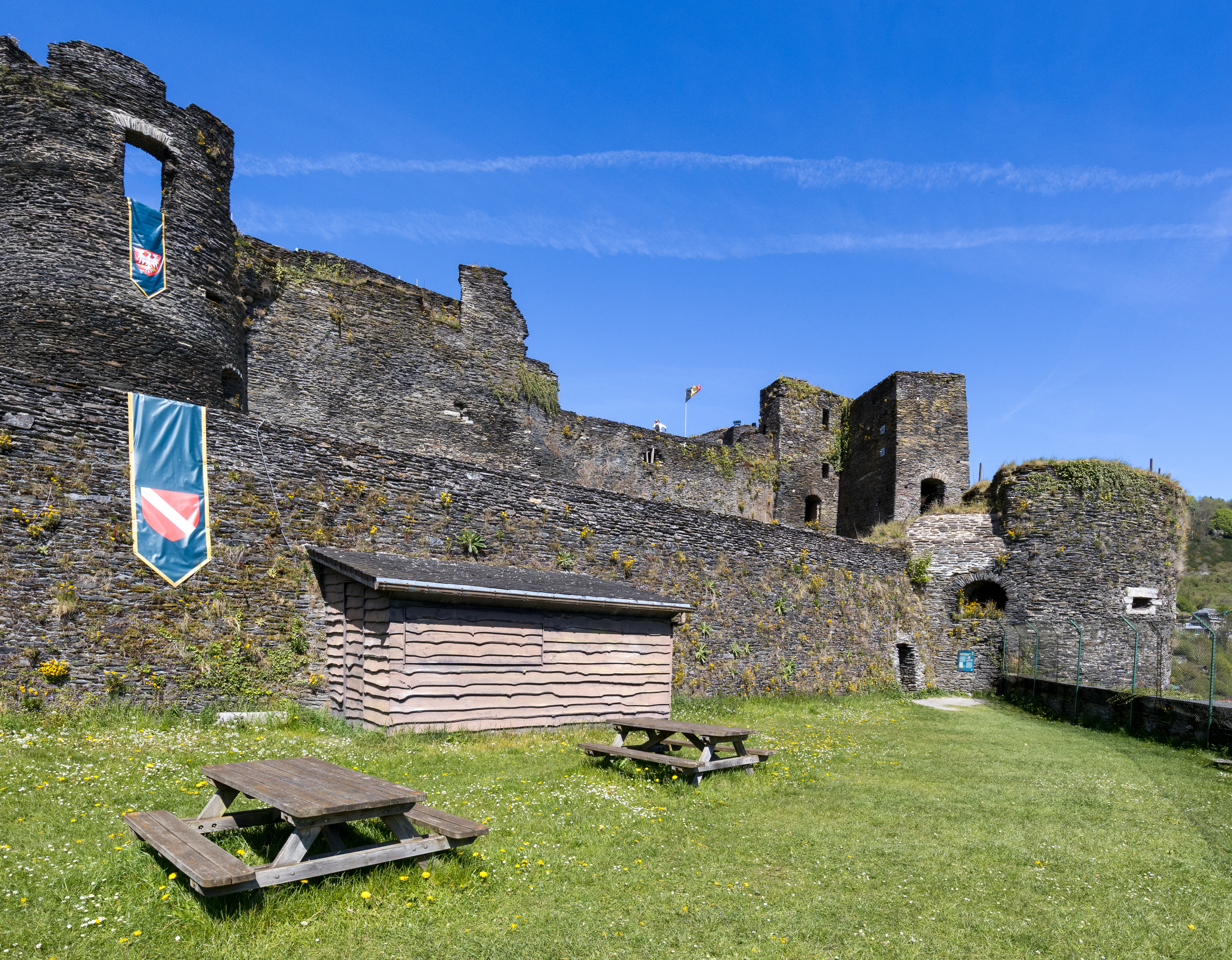

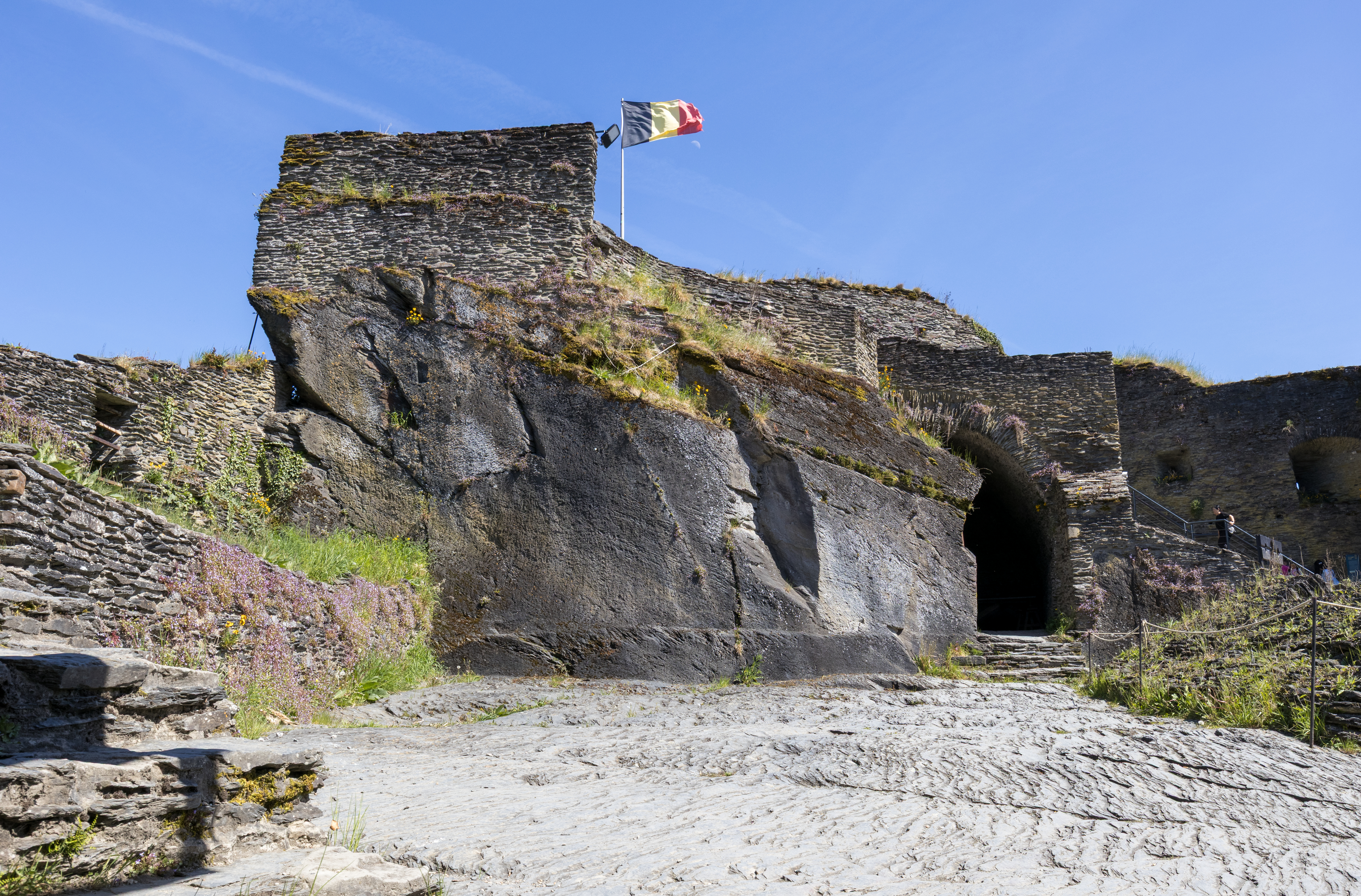

== See also ==
- List of castles in Belgium
