= Ortho, Belgium =

Ortho Ortô (Walloon)
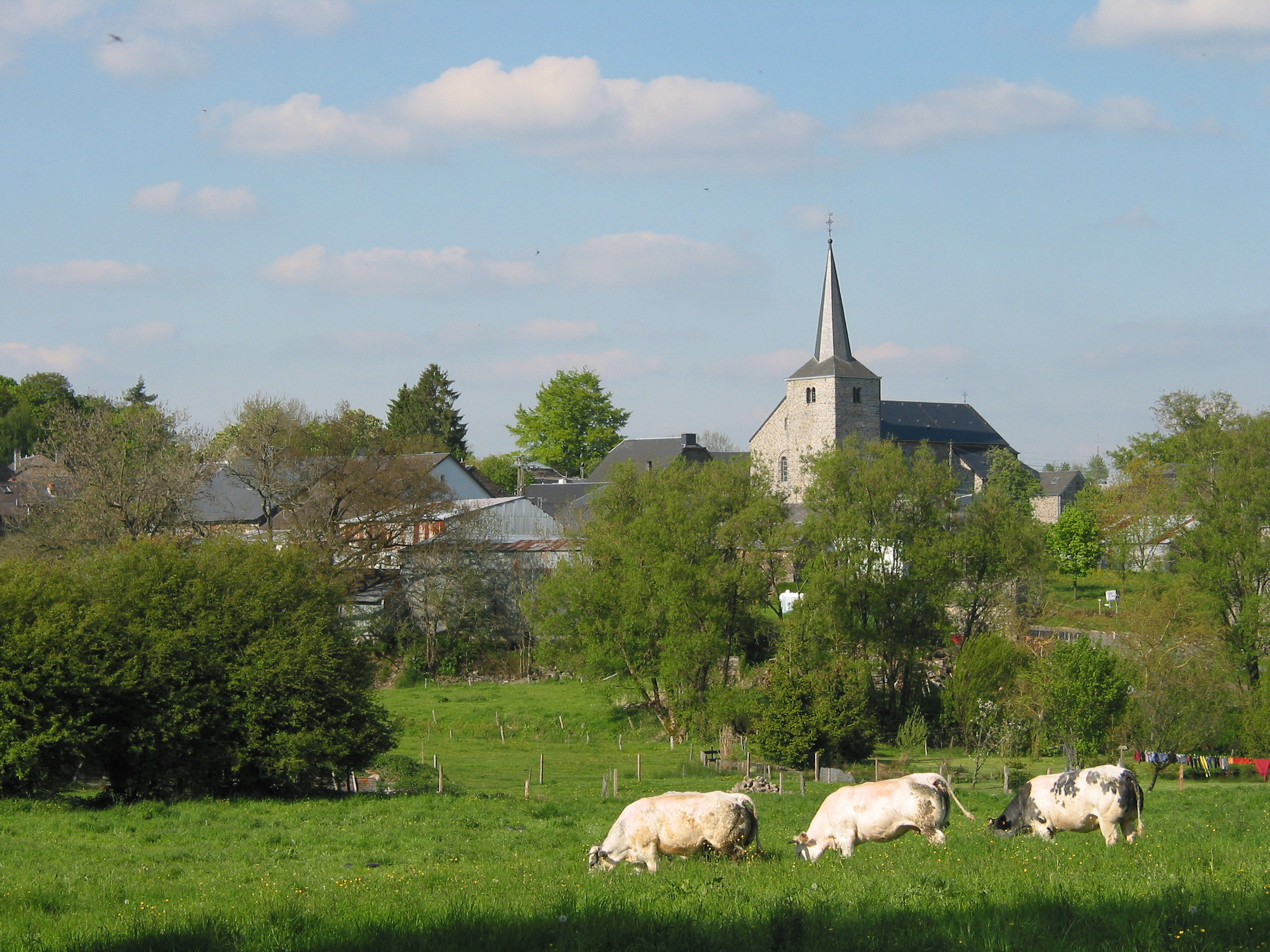
- Ortho

- Location in Belgium Ortho (Europe)
- Coordinates: 50°07′N 05°36′E
- Country: Belgium
- Region: Wallonia
- Province: Luxembourg
- Municipality: La Roche-en-Ardenne
- Postal code: 6983

Ortho (French pronunciation: [ɔʁto]; Walloon: Ortô) is a village of Wallonia and a district of the municipality of La Roche-en-Ardenne, located in the province of Luxembourg, Belgium.

The village is located at an altitude of 475 metres (1,558 ft) above sea level. It consists of houses built mainly during the 19th and 20th centuries, but also some from the 18th century. The chapel of Hervlinval was built in 1627. There are also the remains of a fortification from the Late Roman Empire in Ortho. The village was formerly a dependency of the Abbey of Saint-Hubert.
