= The Valley of the Nervia =

1884 painting by Claude Monet

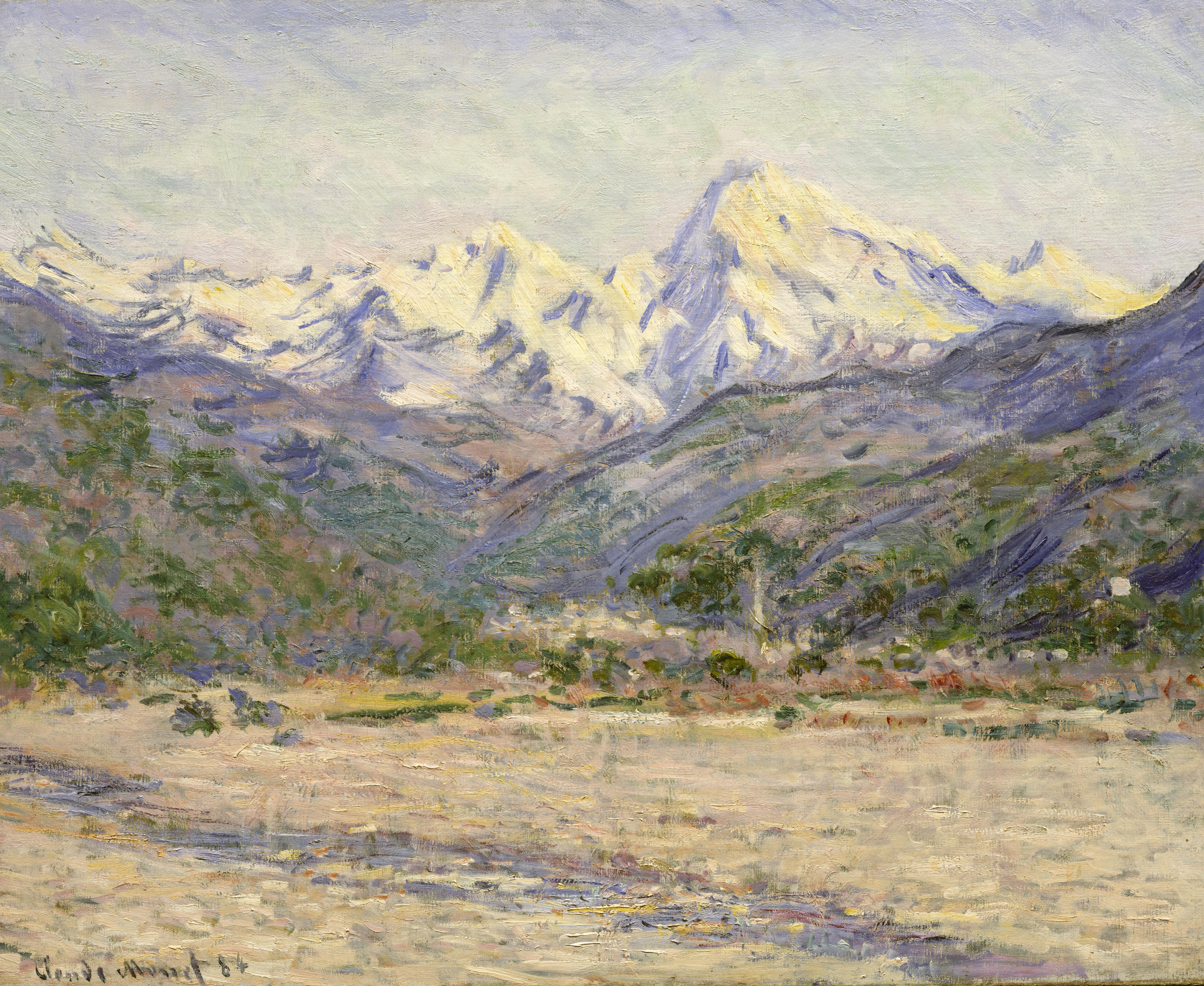
- Artist: Claude Monet
- Year: 1884
- Medium: Oil on canvas
- Dimensions: 66 cm × 81.3 cm (26 in × 32.0 in)
- Location: Metropolitan Museum of Art; New York

The Valley of the Nervia is a late 19th-century painting by French artist Claude Monet. The work is in the collection of the Metropolitan Museum of Art.

== Description ==
The Valley of the Nervia depicts the mountains of the Italian Riviera, where Monet had spent several months in 1884.

The composition comprises three horizontal bands of colour, an upper white band of snow-capped mountains, a green band of foothills and the lower beige foreground in which the village of Camporosso nestles under the foothills on the banks of the River Nervia.

== See also ==
- List of paintings by Claude Monet
