= Léon Devos (artist) =

Belgian painter

- Born: 1897; Petit-Enghien, Belgium
- Died: 1974 (aged 76–77); Précy-sous-Thil, France
- Known for: Painting

Léon Devos (1897–1974) was a Belgian painter. He studied in Mons and at the Académie Royale des Beaux-Arts in Brussels.

In 1928, Devos, Anto-Carte, Léon Navez, and Frans Depooter became co-founders of the Groupe Nervia.
