= La Roche-en-Ardenne =

City in Wallonia, Belgium

La Roche-en-Ardenne: Li Rotche (Walloon)
- City and municipality
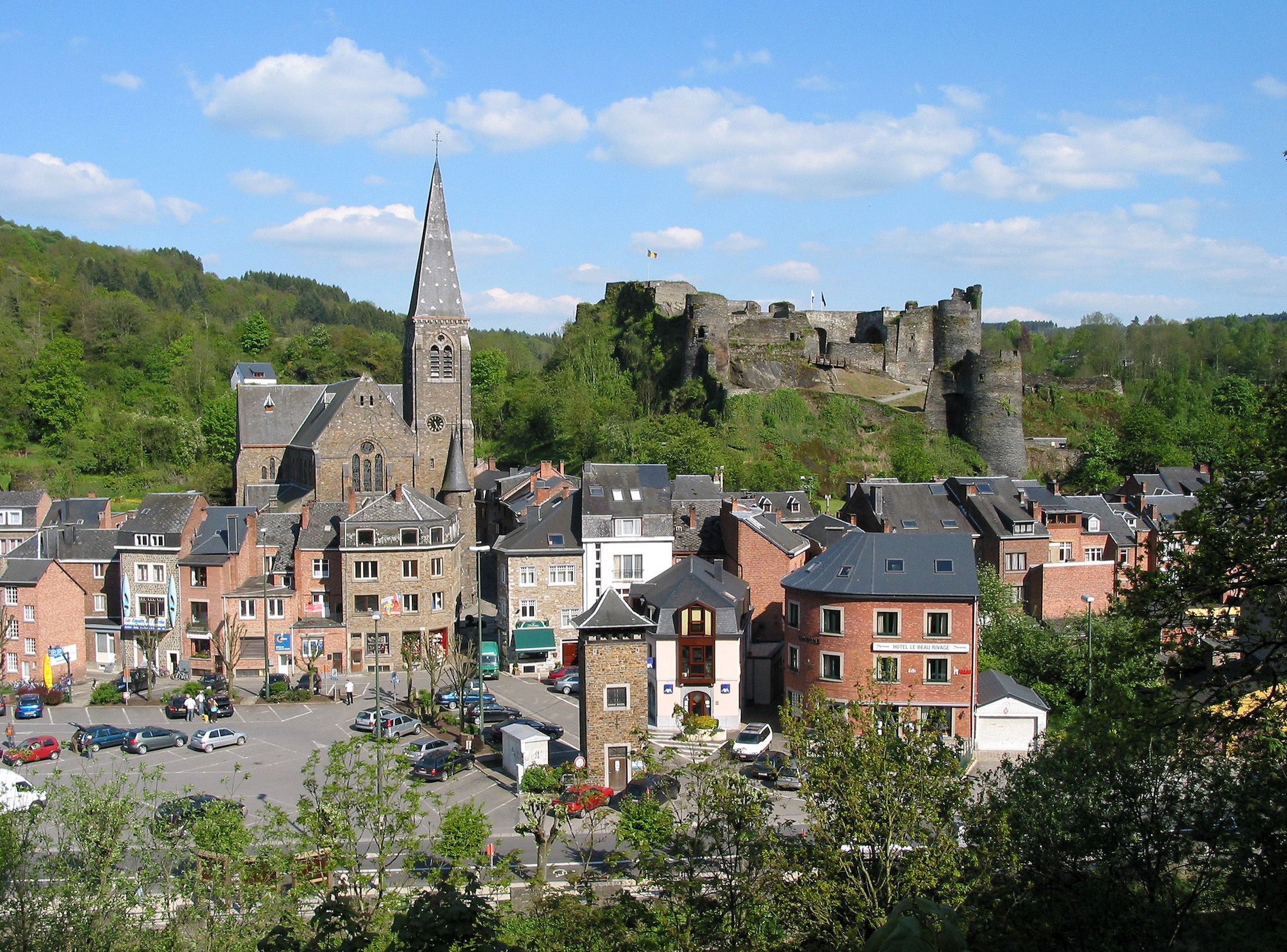
- La Roche: the town centre below its medieval castle

- Flag Coat of arms

- Location of La Roche-en-Ardenne in Luxembourg province
- Interactive map of La Roche-en-Ardenne
- Location in Belgium
- Coordinates: 50°10.9′N 05°34.5′E
- Country: Belgium
- Community: French Community
- Region: Wallonia
- Province: Luxembourg
- Arrondissement: Marche-en-Famenne

Government
  - Mayor: Guy Gilloteaux (MR)
  - Governing party: Pour Vous

Area
  - Total: 148.53 km^{2} (57.35 sq mi)

Population (2018-01-01)
  - Total: 4,194
  - Density: 28.24/km^{2} (73.13/sq mi)
- Postal codes: 6980, 6982-6984, 6986
- NIS code: 83031
- Area codes: 084
- Website: www.la-roche-en-ardenne.be

La Roche-en-Ardenne (French pronunciation: [la ʁɔʃ ɑ̃.n‿aʁdɛn]; Walloon: Li Rotche) is a city and municipality of Wallonia located in the province of Luxembourg and the arrondissement of Marche-en-Famenne, Belgium. Lying beside a bend in the River Ourthe, the small town of La Roche-en-Ardenne is one of the most popular tourist destinations in the Ardennes. Its name is derived from its position on a rock commanding the river.

On 1 January 2007 the municipality, which covers 147.52 km^{2}, had 4,348 inhabitants, giving a population density of 29.5 inhabitants per km^{2}.

The municipality consists of the following districts: Beausaint, Halleux, Hives, La Roche-en-Ardenne, Ortho, and Samrée. Other population centres include Bérismenil, Buisson, Cielle, Floumont, Herlinval, Hubermont, Lavaux, Maboge, Mierchamps, Mousny, Nisramont, Ronchampays, Ronchamps, Roupage, Thimont, Vecmont, and Warempage.

== Geography ==
La Roche-en-Ardenne is located between the E25 Liège-Luxembourg and the N4 motorways. More than half of the municipal area (about 85 square kilometres (33 sq mi)) is covered in forests and 50 square kilometres (19 sq mi) is arable land, and only 8 square kilometres (3.1 sq mi) has been built on. The division between deciduous and coniferous forests is more or less equal.

== History ==
La Roche is believed to have first been settled in the Neolithic era. There is a Celtic archaeological site dating between 850 and 520 BC. The Romans built a fort there following their conquest of Gaul and the Ardennes.

The town's medieval castle was in use between the 9th and 18th centuries. It provided protection to the many barges that plied their trade along the local river systems. It may have been the site of a sporting lodge of Pippin, and certainly the counts of La Roche held it in fief from his descendants, the Carolingian rulers. In the 12th century they sold it to the counts of Luxembourg.

In 1331, permission to build city walls was given by John the Blind, King of Bohemia and Poland and a Count of Luxembourg.

In World War II, the town was occupied by both German and Allied forces, suffering severe damage. Freed by Americans in September 1944, the town was recaptured by the Germans in December, during the Battle of the Bulge. The subsequent Allied bombing raids resulted in the town being reoccupied by Americans once more in January 1945, but left much of it destroyed and 116 residents dead. An American Sherman M4A1 tank and a British Achilles SP 17pdr are displayed as monuments to the town's liberation. In town also is a memorial to the 82nd Armored Reconnaissance Battalion.

In 1976 there was a merger of administrative districts in the area that resulted in the municipality of La Roche-en-Ardennes. Beausaint, Halleux, Hives, Ortho and Samrée were joined by Cielle detached from Marcourt, now within the municipality of Rendeux.

== Economy ==
Hiking, kayaking, and mountain biking are among the outdoor pursuits available here. The municipality's other main economic activity is agriculture. A business park was established on the plateau Vecmont to diversify the local economy.

The ceramic stoneware of La Roche (cobalt blue pottery, glazed with salt) is a local tradition, initiated in 1836 by Henry Hoffman, a native of Ransbach in the Duchy of Nassau. The production was revived in 1878 by the family Kalb and continued until 2009 by several successors. There is a permanent exhibition of this tradition.

== Governance ==
Like other Belgian Municipalities, the town is governed by a Communal College, whose membership is determined by the size of the population. In 2012, that was the Mayor, Town Clerk and 3 Alderman. An elected City Council determined what local taxes are spent and on what. As of 2012, this had a membership of 9 councillors.

== Sights ==
There are three main archaeological sites:

- Le Cheslé de Bérismenil, a Celtic refuge
- le Cheslin d'Ortho, a Roman refuge
- La Roche-en-Ardenne Castle

There is the Parc à Gibier, a small wild game park on the top of the plateau above the town.
