= Marloie =

Marloie Mårloye (Walloon)
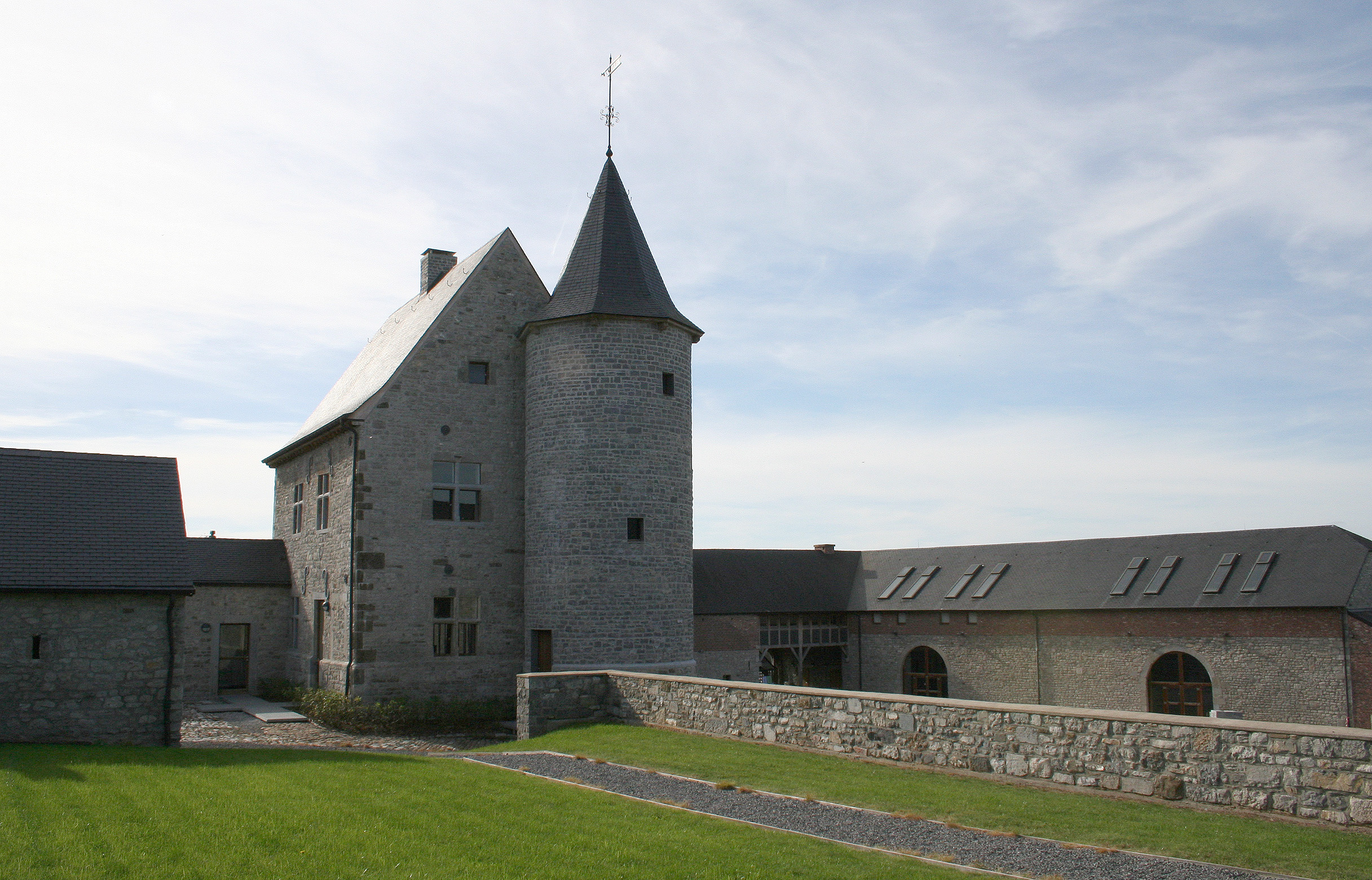
- Marloie, 15th-century fortified farm

- Location within Belgium Location within Europe
- Coordinates: 50°11′N 05°19′E
- Country: Belgium
- Region: Wallonia
- Province: Luxembourg
- Municipality: Marche-en-Famenne

Marloie (French pronunciation: [maʁlwa]; Walloon: Mårloye [mɔːʀ.'lõj]) is a village of Wallonia in the municipality of Marche-en-Famenne, district of Waha, located in the province of Luxembourg, Belgium.

The so-called Vieille cense (Vieille cense de Marloie) in the middle of Marloie is a medieval fortified farm which originally belonged to the Abbey of Saint-Hubert. Dating from the 15th century, it today houses a community centre and other functions. The village of Marloie grew rapidly during the 19th century, with the arrival of the railway line which connects Arlon and Brussels. In May 1944, during World War II, the village was heavily damaged and several people died when a German train loaded with explosives in the railway station of Marloie was attacked by Allied aircraft and blew up.
