= Anto Carte =

Belgian painter

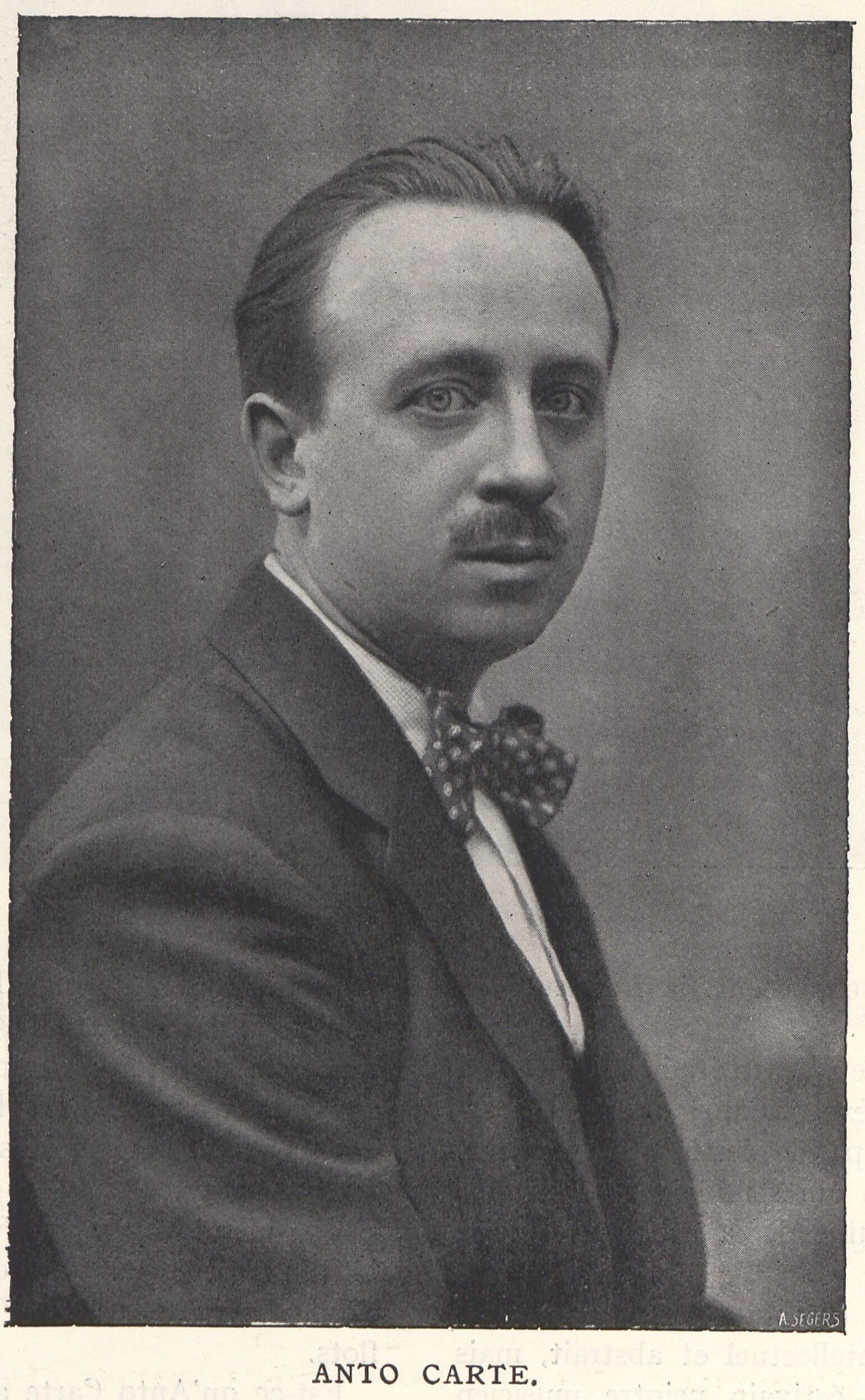
Anto Carte

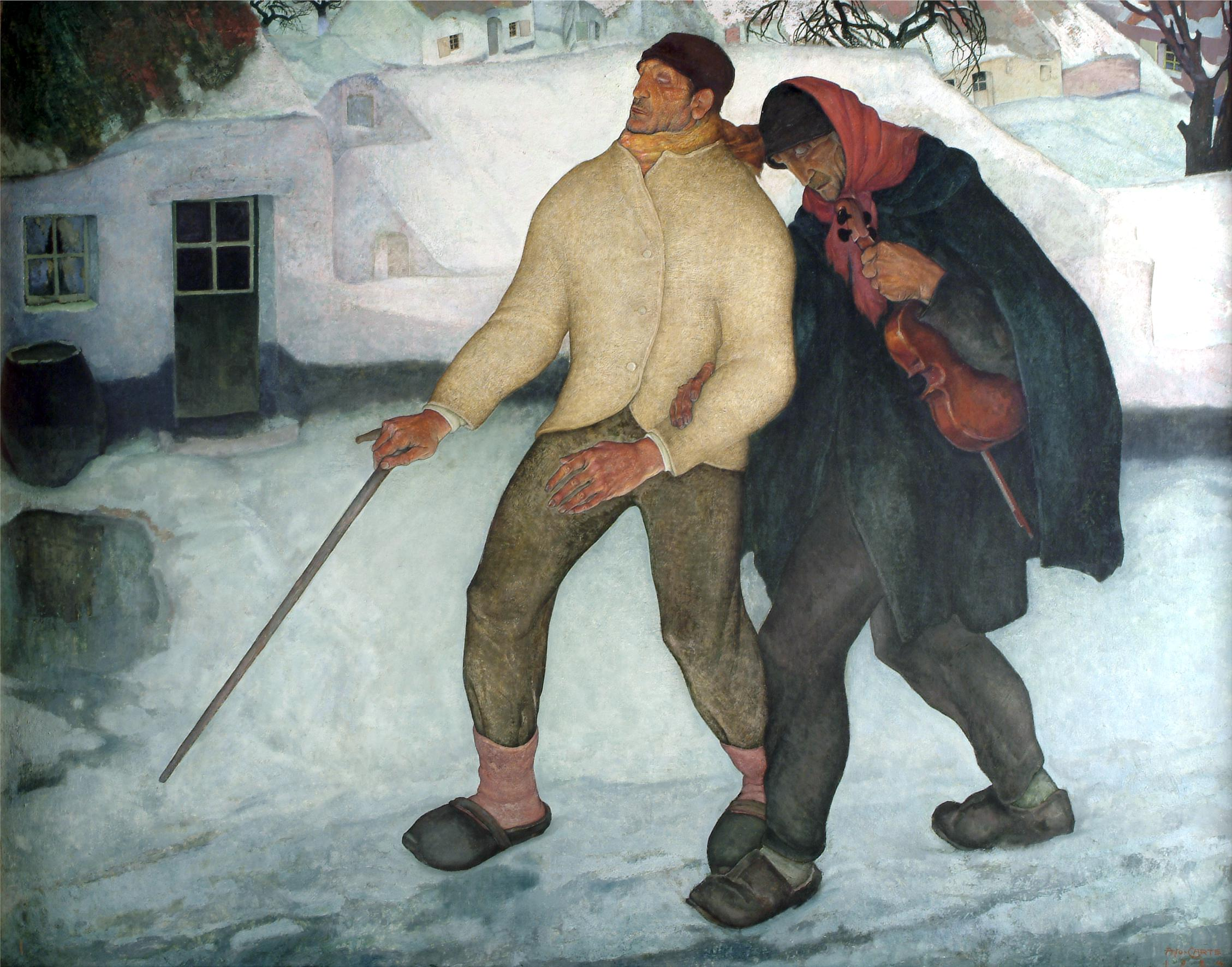
Les deux aveugles, 1924

Antoine "Anto" Carte (8 December 1886 - 15 February 1954) was a Belgian painter.

Antoine Carto was born in Mons in 1886. His father was a joiner. Anto Carte was first apprenticed to François Depooter, an interior painter, and then studied art at the academies of Mons and Brussels, and in Paris. He started working in a Symbolist style, but after the First World War became a Flemish Expressionist painter in the style of the painters of the group of Sint-Martens-Latem like Gustave Van de Woestijne. In 1917 he had his first exposition, of illustrations he made for a work by Emile Verhaeren. He exposed together with the Flemish Expressionists at the 1923 Salon d'Automne in Paris. He had a solo exhibition in Pittsburgh, at the Carnegie Institute, in 1924, where all 60 paintings were sold. Retrospective exhibitions at the Museum of Mons were organised in 1949 and in 1995.

Later in his career, he designed many posters and stained glass windows, including in 1927 the windows for a new building at the University of Mons-Hainaut. He also designed a 50 Belgian Francs banknote.

In 1928, he founded the art group Groupe Nervia together with Louis Buisseret. From 1932 on, he was a professor at the La Cambre school and at the Académie Royale des Beaux-Arts in Brussels.

He lived most of his career in Braine-le-Château, and died in Ixelles in 1954.
