= List of Roman villas in Belgium =

This is a list of Roman villas in Belgium. It is ordered by province. Links in bold direct to a page specifically on that villa; ordinary links link to an article on the town or village in or near which that villa is sited.

== By province ==
=== Antwerp ===
- Hombeek, Mechelen
- Leest, Mechelen
- Mortsel
- Muizen, Mechelen
- Vorst, Laakdal

=== Brabant (Flemish) ===
- Asbeek, Asse
- Attenhoven, Holsbeek
- Bierbeek
- Hoegaarden
- Meldert, Hoegaarden
- Merchtem
- Wange, Landen
- Wemmel

=== Brabant (Walloon) ===
- Basse-Wavre, Wavre
- Céroux-Mousty, Ottignies-Louvain-la-Neuve
- Chastre
- Cortil-Noirmont, Chastre
- Grez, Grez-Doiceau
- Sclimpré, Mélin, Jodoigne / Wahenge, Beauvechain
- Thines, Nivelles
- Tombe, Tourinnes-Saint-Lambert, Walhain (Roman vicus)
- Villeroux, Chastre

=== Brussels ===
- Biestebroeck, Anderlecht
- Jette
- Chaussée d'Haecht Schaerbeek

=== East Flanders ===
- Belsele, Sint-Niklaas
- Blandijnberg, Ghent
- Denderwindeke, Ninove
- Etikhove, Maarkedal
- Heldergem, Haaltert
- Hofstade, Aalst
- Michelbeke, Brakel
- Scheldewindeke, Oosterzele
- Velzeke, Zottegem

=== Hainaut ===
- Auberchies, Beloeil
- Basècles, Beloeil
- Biercée, Thuin
- Blaton, Bernissart
- Blicquy, Leuze-en-Hainaut (Roman vicus)
- Bruyelle, Antoing
- Cambron, Brugelette
- Chièvres
- Estinnes-au-Val, Estinnes
- Farciennes
- Froyennes, Tournai
- Gerpinnes
- Gilly, Charleroi
- Gosselies, Charleroi
- Ghislengien, Ath
- Hautrage, Saint-Ghislain
- Kennelée, Antoing
- Maffle, Ath
- Merbes-le-Château
- Meslin-l'Évêque, Ath
- Montignies-sur-Sambre, Charleroi
- Moranfayt, Dour
- Motte, Onnezies-Montignies-sur-Roc, Honnelles
- Moustier, Frasnes-lez-Anvaing
- Péruwelz
- Popuelles, Celles
- Sart, Mons
- Soignies (two villae, one in la Coulbrie and the "balneum" of l'Espesse)
- Solre-Saint-Gery, Beaumont
- Solre-sur-Sambre, Erquelinnes
- Strepy, La Louvière
- Tiripré, Ladeuze, Chièvres
- Nouvelles, Mons

=== Liège ===
- Acosse, Wasseiges
- Anthisnes
- Autuaxhe, Waremme
- Awans
- Bertrée, Hannut
- Borsu, Clavier
- Chokier, Flémalle
- Corswarem, Berloz
- Crisnée
- Deidenberg, Amel
- Haccourt-Froidmont, Liège
- Herstal, Liège (2 villae)
- Heure-le-Romain, Oupeye
- Hody, Anthisnes
- Jupille, Liège
- Kemexhe, Crisnée
- Place Saint-Lambert, Liège
- Lincent, Waremme
- Marchin
- Odeur, Crisnée
- Ramelot, Tinlot
- Vaux, Vaux-et-Borset, Villers-le-Bouillet
- Vervoz, Ocquier, Clavier
- Villers-le-Bouillet
- Villers-le-Temple, Nandrin
- Villes-en-Hesbaye, Braives

=== Limburg ===
- Bilzen
- Broekom, Borgloon
- Gingelom
- 's-Gravenvoeren, Voeren
- Hoeselt
- Kleine Spouwen, Bilzen
- Lafelt, Riemst
- Meerberg, Val-Meer, Riemst
- Montenaken, Gingelom
- Piringen, Tongeren
- Rekem-Neerharen, Lanaken
- Rosmeer, Bilzen
- Sint-Truiden
- Vechmaal, Heers

=== Luxembourg ===
- Amberloup, Sainte-Ode (Roman vicus)
- Chelche, Hollange, Fauvillers
- Dampicourt, Rouvroy
- Hachy, Habay
- Heckbous, Arlon
- Hollogne, Waha, Marche-en-Famenne
- Lionfaing, Vaux-sur-Sûre
- Mageroy, Habay-la-Vieille, Habay
- Nadrin, Houffalize
- Remagne, Libramont-Chevigny
- Rémichampagne, Hompré, Vaux-sur-Sûre
- Rettigny, Cherain, Gouvy
- Robelmont, Meix-devant-Virton
- Sainte-Marie-Chevigny, Libramont-Chevigny
- Schockville, Attert
- Tintange, Fauvillers (Roman vicus)
- Vaux, Cherain, Gouvy

=== Namur ===
- Baillonville, Somme-Leuze
- Barcène, Ciney
- Barvaux-Condroz, Havelange
- Berlacominne, Vedrin, Namur
- Bruyère, Leignon, Ciney
- Chapois, Leignon, Ciney
- Chardeneux-Bonsin, Somme-Leuze
- Chestruvin, Onhaye
- Conneux, Ciney
- Corria, Gesves
- Eve, Evelette, Ohey
- Flavion, Florennes
- Flawinne, Namur
- Fontaine, Anthée, Onhaye
- Frasnes, Couvin
- Furfooz, Dinant
- Gourdinne, Walcourt
- Haut-le-Wastia, Anhée
- Hemptinne, Fernelmont
- Le Hody, Champion-Emptinne, Hamois
- Lisogne, Dinant
- Lustin, Profondeville (Roman castrum)
- Maffe, Havelange
- Maillen, Assesse (four villae, in Arche, Maharée, Ronchinne and Sauvenière)
- Malagne, Rochefort
- Matagne, Ohey
- Matagne-la-Grande, Doische
- Miécret, Havelange
- Mohiville, Hamois
- Morville, Florennes
- Reumont, Malonne, Namur
- Roly, Philippeville
- Tahier, Evelette, Ohey
- Treignes, Viroinval
- Try-Hallot, Saint-Gérard, Mettet
- Vezin-Namêchte, Andenne
- Wancennes, Gedinne

=== West Flanders ===
- Heestert, Zwevegem
- Kerkhove, Avelgem
- Kooigem, Kortrijk
- Tiegem, Anzegem
- Velzeke, Kruishoutem
- Wervik

== Related links ==
- Archeoforum of Liège - Archéoforum
- Villa Romaine de Basse-Wavre
- Villa romaine de Malagne
- Map of Gallo-Roman cities, towns, villas, forts and tumuli in Belgium

== See also ==
- Gallo-Roman culture
- List of oppida in the Low Countries
