= Roman villa =

Historical residential structure

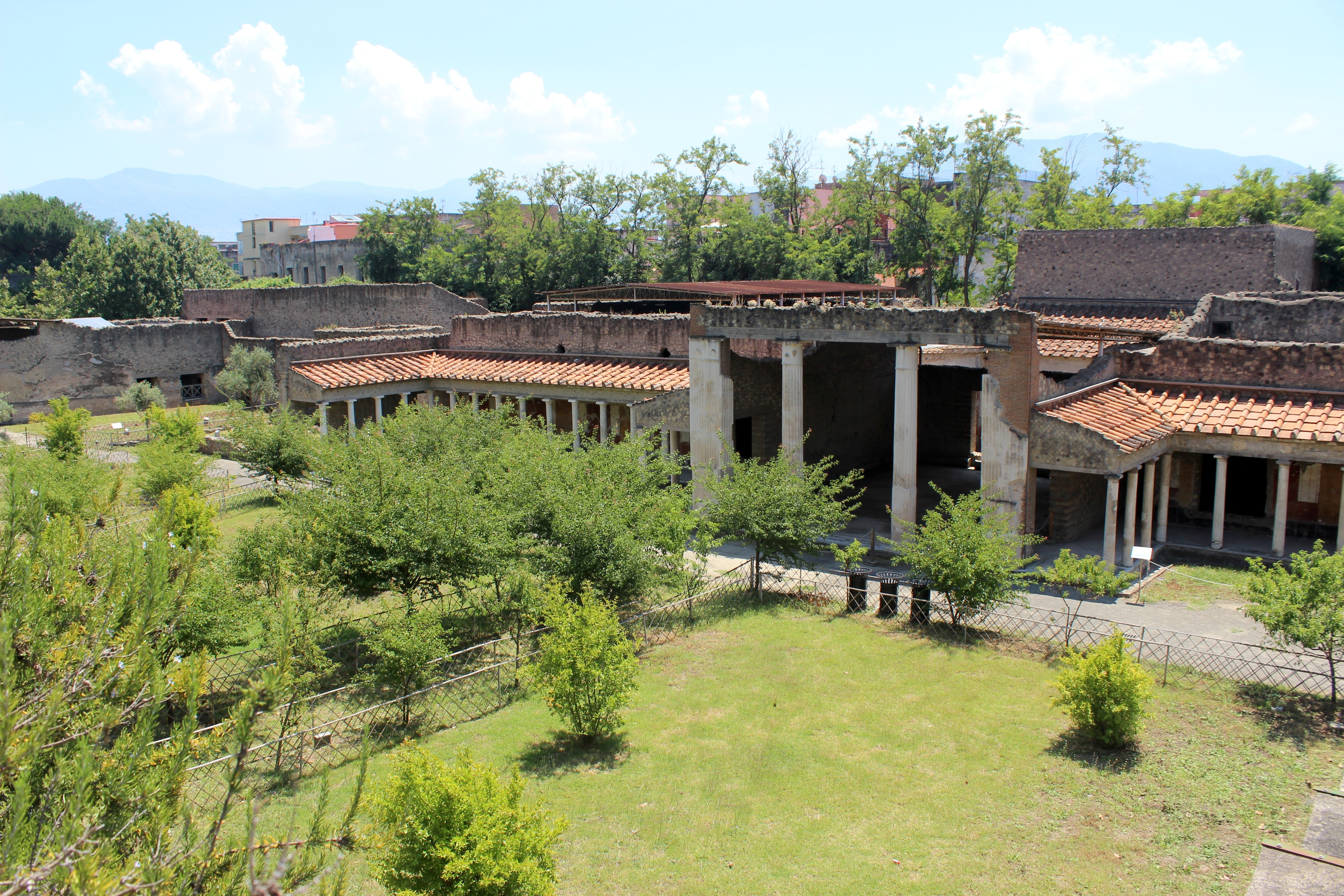
Villa Poppaea at Oplontis (c. 50 BC)

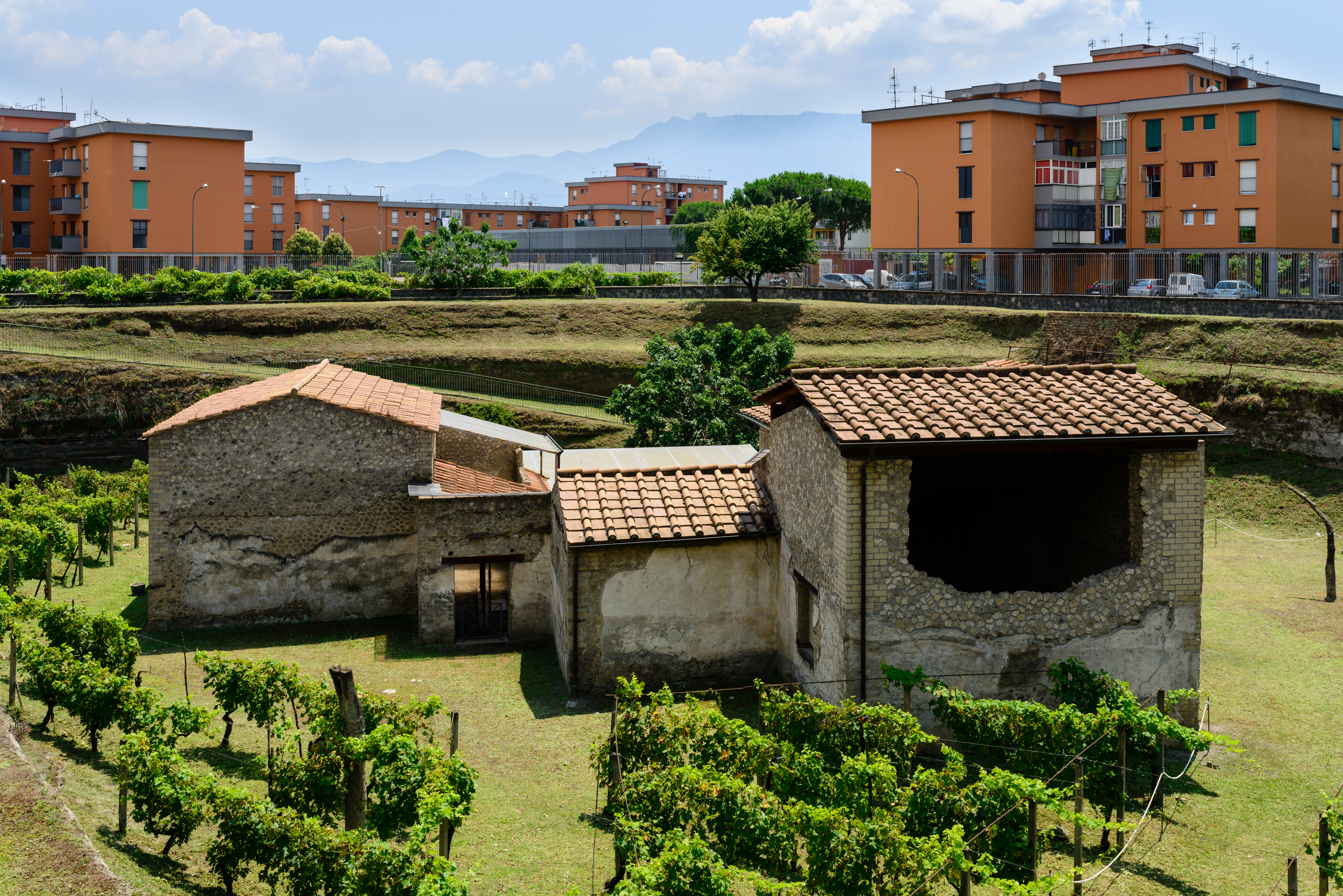
Villa Regina, Boscoreale

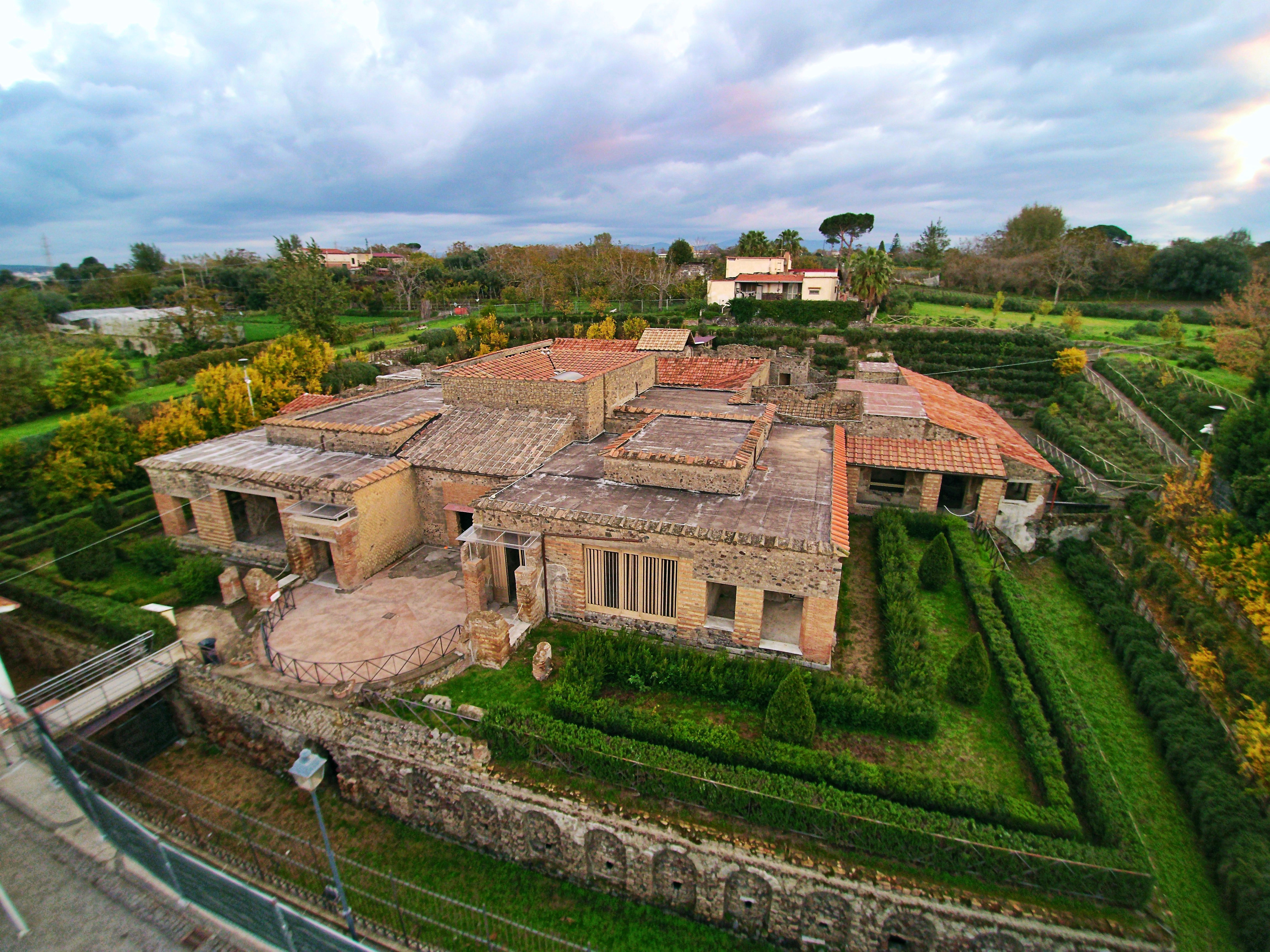
Villa of the Mysteries, Pompeii

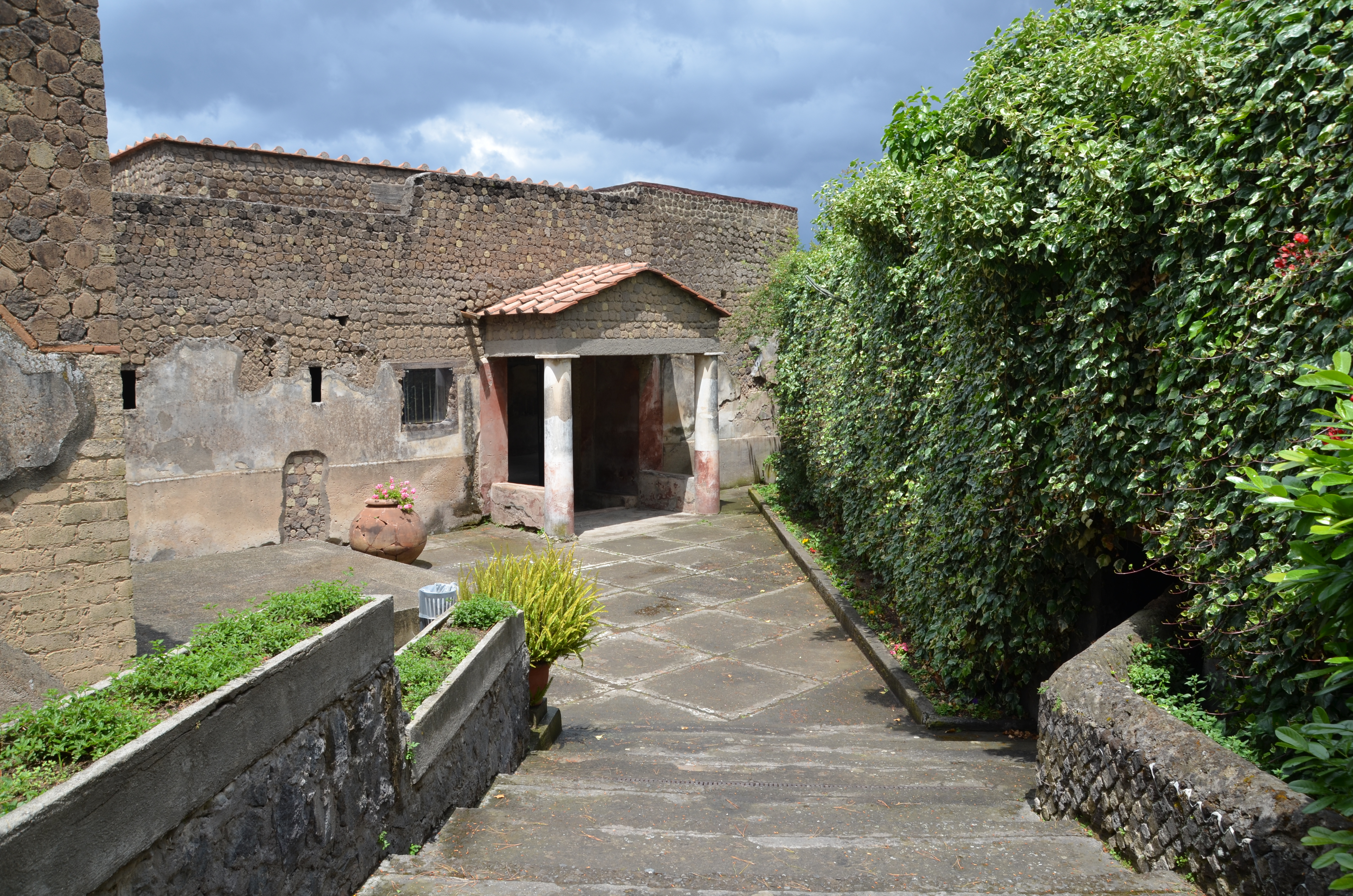
Entrance to the Villa San Marco, Stabiae

A Roman villa was typically a farmhouse or country house in the territory of the Roman Republic and the Roman Empire, sometimes reaching extravagant proportions.

Nevertheless, the term "Roman villa" generally covers buildings with the common features of being extra-urban (i.e. located outside urban settlements, unlike the domus which was inside them) and residential, with accommodation for the owner. The definition also changed with time: the earliest examples are mostly humble farmhouses in Italy, while from the Republican period a range of larger building types are included.

== Typology and distribution ==
The present meaning of "villa" is partially based on the fairly numerous ancient Roman written sources and on archaeological remains, though many of these are poorly preserved.

The most detailed ancient text on the meaning of "villa" is by Varro (116–27 BC) dating from the end of the Republican period, which is used for most modern considerations. But Roman authors (e.g. Columella [4-70 AD], Cato the Elder [234-149 BC]) wrote in different times, with different objectives and for aristocratic readers and hence had specific interpretations of villa.

The Romans built many kinds of villas and any country house with some decorative features in the Roman style may be called a "villa" by modern scholars.

Three kinds of villas were generally described:

- the villa urbana (e.g. Pliny's villa at Laurentum), or villa suburbana (according to Columella), an estate with little or no agriculture situated in the country, in the suburbs of a town or within close vicinity to a city; and
- the villa rustica (Pliny's villa in Tuscis), a farmhouse estate usually associated with small-scale agriculture or viticulture.
- the villa marittima, usually near the sea or river.

Other examples of villae urbanae were the middle and late Republican villas that encroached on the Campus Martius, at that time on the edge of Rome, the one at Rome's Parco della Musica or at Grottarossa in Rome, and those outside the city walls of Pompeii which demonstrate the antiquity and heritage of the villa urbana in Central Italy.

Other type of villa was a large commercial estate called latifundium which produced and exported agricultural produce; such villas might lack luxuries (e.g. Cato) but many were very sumptuous (e.g. Varro).

The whole estate of a villa was also called a praedium, fundus or sometimes, rus.

A villa rustica had 2 or 3 parts:

- pars urbana; residential part for the owner
- pars rustica; service, farm personnel and livestock section run by a villicus or farm manager
- sometimes a separate pars fructaria for production and storage of oil, wine, grain, grapes etc..

Under the Empire, many patrician villas were built on the coasts (villae maritimae) such as those on picturesque sites overlooking the Bay of Naples like the Villa of the Papyri at Herculaneum, or on the isle of Capri, at Circeii and at Antium. Wealthy Romans also escaped the summer heat in the hills within easy reach of Rome, especially around Frascati and including the imperial Hadrian's Villa-palace at Tivoli. Cicero allegedly possessed no fewer than seven villas, the oldest of them, which he inherited, near Arpinum in Latium. Pliny the Younger had three or four which are well known from his descriptions.

By the 4th century, "villa" could simply connote an agricultural holding: Jerome translated in the Gospel of Mark (xiv, 32) chorion, describing the olive grove of Gethsemane, with villa, without an inference that there were any dwellings there at all.

== Architecture of the villa complex ==
By the first century BC, the "classic" villa took many architectural forms, with many examples employing an atrium or peristyle for interior spaces open to light and air.

Villas were often furnished with heated bath suites (thermae) and many would have had under-floor heating known as the hypocaust.

== Social history ==
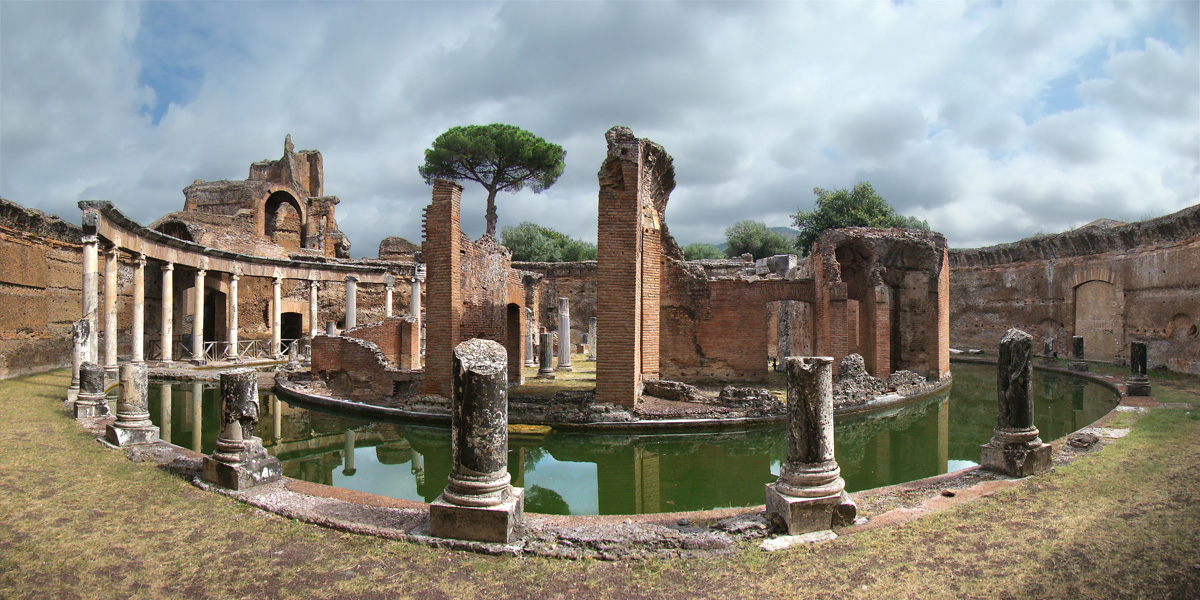
Maritime theatre, Hadrian's Villa, Tivoli

The late Roman Republic witnessed an explosion of villa construction in central Italy (current regions of Toscana, Umbria, Lazio, and Campania), especially in the years following the dictatorship of Sulla (81 BC).

For example the villa at Settefinestre from the 1st century BC was the centre of one of the latifundia involved in large-scale agricultural production in Etruria.

In the imperial period villas sometimes became quite palatial, such as the villas built on seaside slopes overlooking the Gulf of Naples at Baiae and those at Stabiae and the Villa of the Papyri and its library at Herculaneum preserved by the ashfall from the eruption of Mount Vesuvius in 79.

Areas within easy reach of Rome offered cool lodgings in the heat of summer. Hadrian's Villa at Tibur (Tivoli) was in an area popular with Romans of rank. Cicero had several villas. Pliny the Younger described his villas in his letters. The Romans invented the seaside villa: a vignette in a frescoed wall at the House of Marcus Lucretius Fronto in Pompeii still shows a row of seafront villas, all with porticos along the front, some rising up in porticoed tiers to an altana at the top that would catch a breeze.

Villas were centres of a variety of economic activity such as mining, pottery factories, or horse raising such as those found in northwestern Gaul. Villas specialising in the seagoing export of olive oil to Roman legions in Germany became a feature of the southern Iberian province of Hispania Baetica.

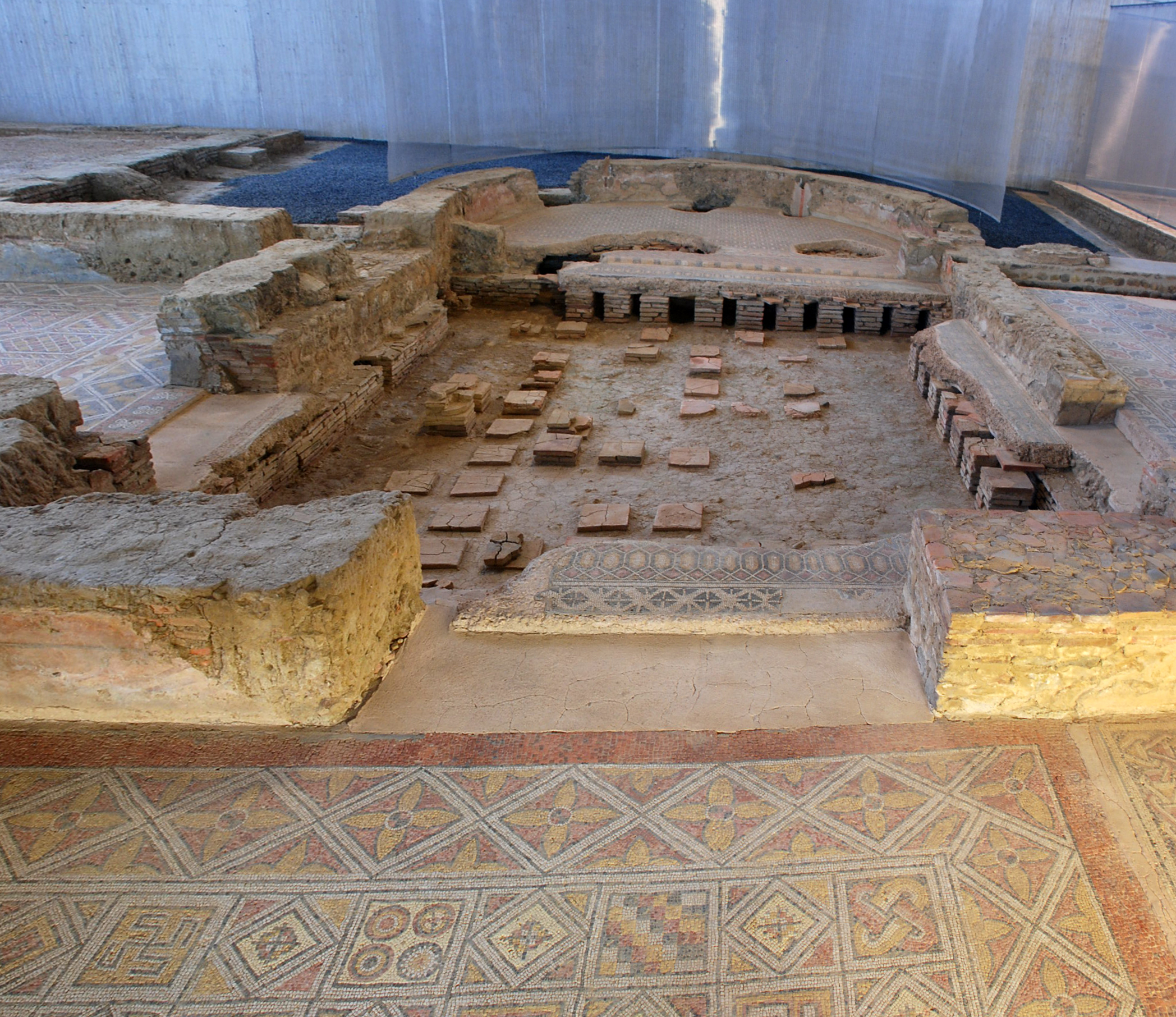
Villas had luxuries like hypocaust-heated rooms with mosaics (La Olmeda, Spain)

In some cases villas survived the fall of the Empire into the Early Middle Ages; large working villas were donated by aristocrats and territorial magnates to individual monks, often to become the nucleus of famous monasteries. For example, Saint Benedict established a monastery in the ruins of a villa at Subiaco that had belonged to Nero. Around 590, Saint Eligius was born in a highly placed Gallo-Roman family at the 'villa' of Chaptelat near Limoges, in Aquitaine. The abbey at Stavelot was founded ca 650 on the domain of a former villa near Liège and Vézelay Abbey had a similar founding. As late as 698, Willibrord established Echternach Abbey at a Roman villa near the city of Trier which Irmina of Oeren, daughter of Dagobert II, king of the Franks, presented to him.

== Examples of Roman villas ==
=== Britain ===
- Bignor Roman Villa in West Sussex, England
- Chedworth Roman Villa in Gloucestershire, England
- Fishbourne Roman Palace in West Sussex, England
- Littlecote Roman Villa in Wiltshire, England
- Llantwit Major Roman Villa in Glamorgan, Wales
- Lullingstone Roman Villa in Kent, England

=== Bulgaria ===
- Villa Armira, near Ivaylovgrad, Bulgaria

=== Germany ===
- Roman Villa Borg

=== Iberian Peninsula ===
- La Olmeda in Palencia, Spain
- Roman ruins of São Cucufate, Portugal

=== Italy ===
- Hadrian's Villa in Tivoli
- Villa Romana del Casale in Piazza Armerina, Sicily
- Villa of the Quintilii, Rome
- Villa of the Mysteries, Pompeii
- House of Menander, Pompeii
- Pliny's Comedy and Tragedy villas, Lake Como

=== Malta ===
- Żejtun Roman villa

=== Switzerland ===
- Gallo-Roman villa of Orbe-Boscéaz

== See also ==
- List of Roman villas in Belgium
- List of Roman villas in England
- List of Roman villas in Wales
- Roman villas in northwestern Gaul
- List of Roman villas in Spain
