= Nennig =

Village in Saarland, Germany

- Ortsteil of Perl
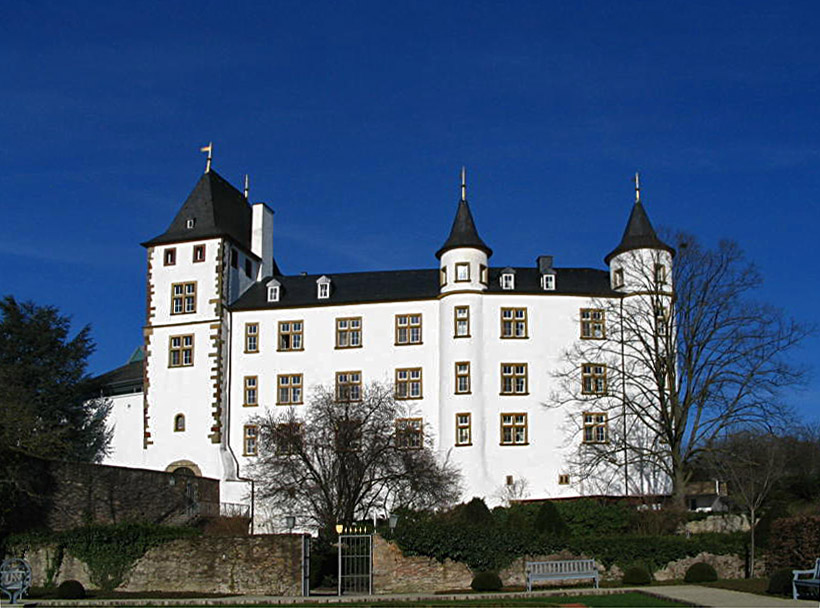
- Schloss Berg

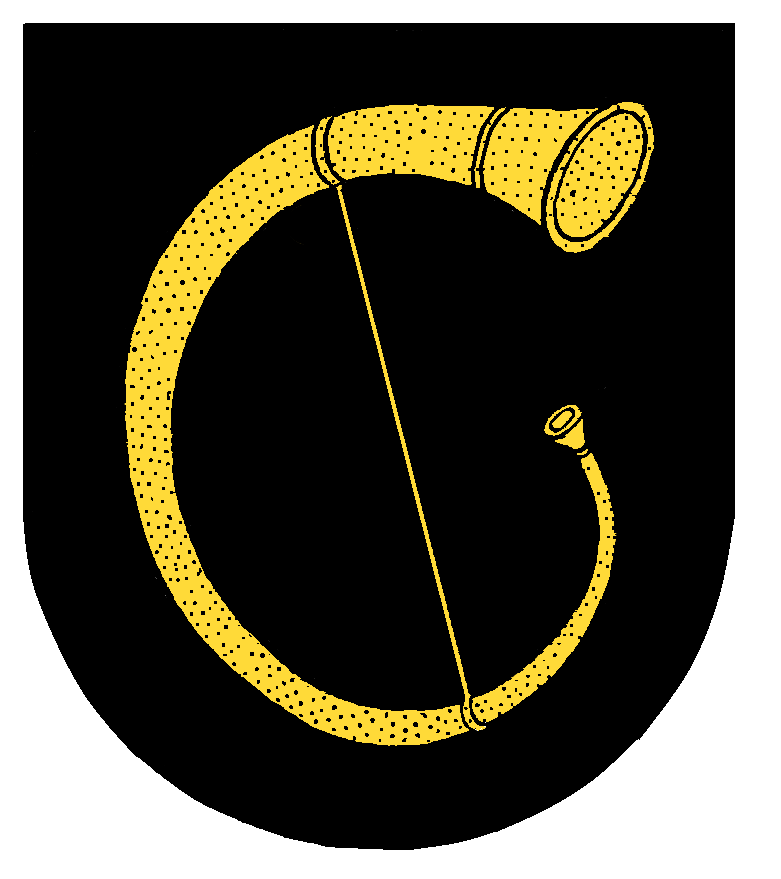
- Coat of arms
- Interactive map of Nennig
- Location within Germany Location within Saarland
- Coordinates: 49°32′00″N 06°23′00″E
- Country: Germany
- State: Saarland
- District: Merzig-Wadern
- Municipality: Perl

Area
  - Total: 9.73 km^{2} (3.76 sq mi)
- Elevation: 260 m (850 ft)

Population (2010)
  - Total: 1,149
  - Density: 118/km^{2} (306/sq mi)
- Demonym: Nenniger
- Time zone: UTC+01:00 (CET)
  - Summer (DST): UTC+02:00 (CEST)
- Postal codes: 66706
- Dialling codes: 06866
- Vehicle registration: MZG
- Website: Official website

Nennig is a village in the Saarland, Germany, part of the municipality of Perl. It is situated on the river Moselle, opposite Remich, Luxembourg.

== Overview ==
Nennig is known for a Roman villa containing well-preserved mosaics that were excavated in the 19th century. The village was a condominium of the Trier bishopric, Lorraine (the Kingdom of France from 1766) and Luxembourg until its annexation by Revolutionary France in 1794. During the Second World War Nennig was almost completely destroyed as the village changed hands several times in late-1944 and early-1945.

== Photogallery ==
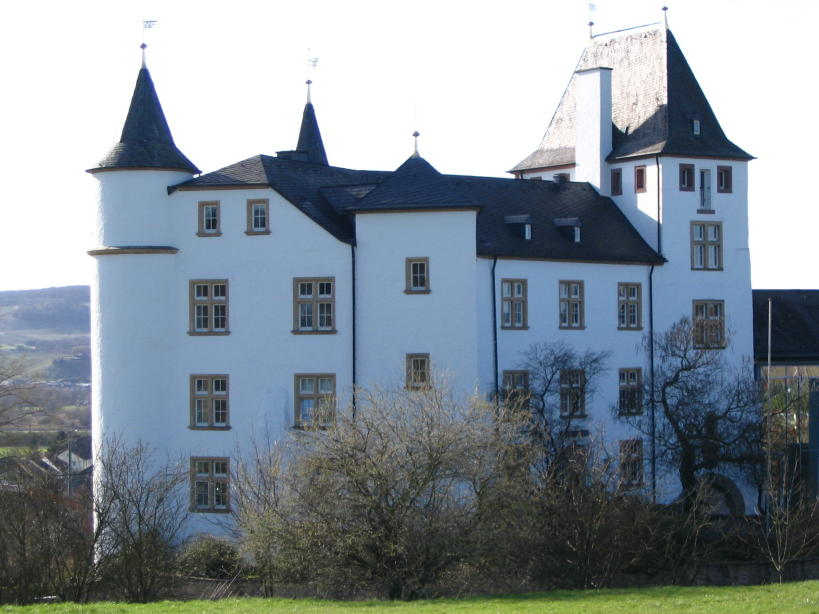
Schloss Berg

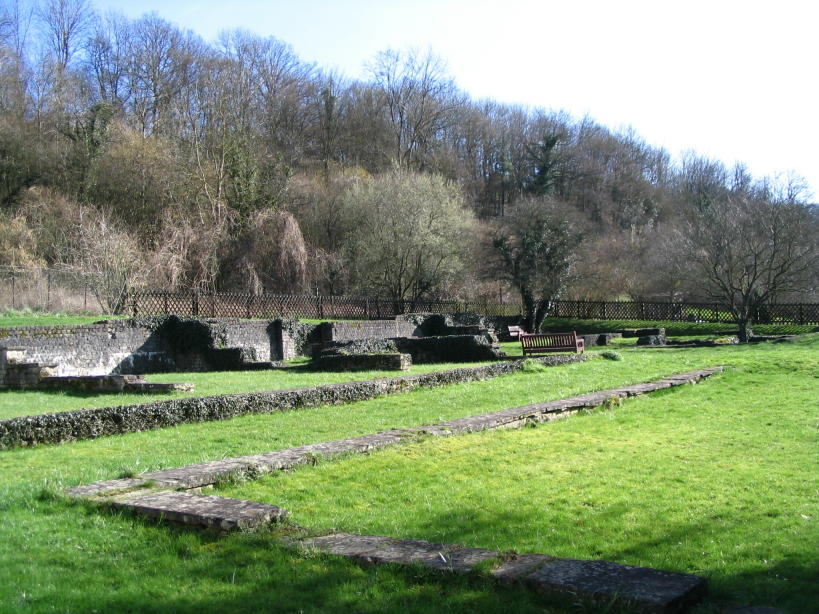
Roman villa
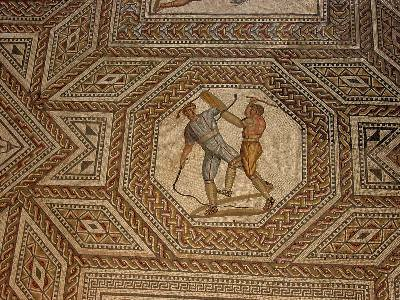
Mosaic in Roman villa

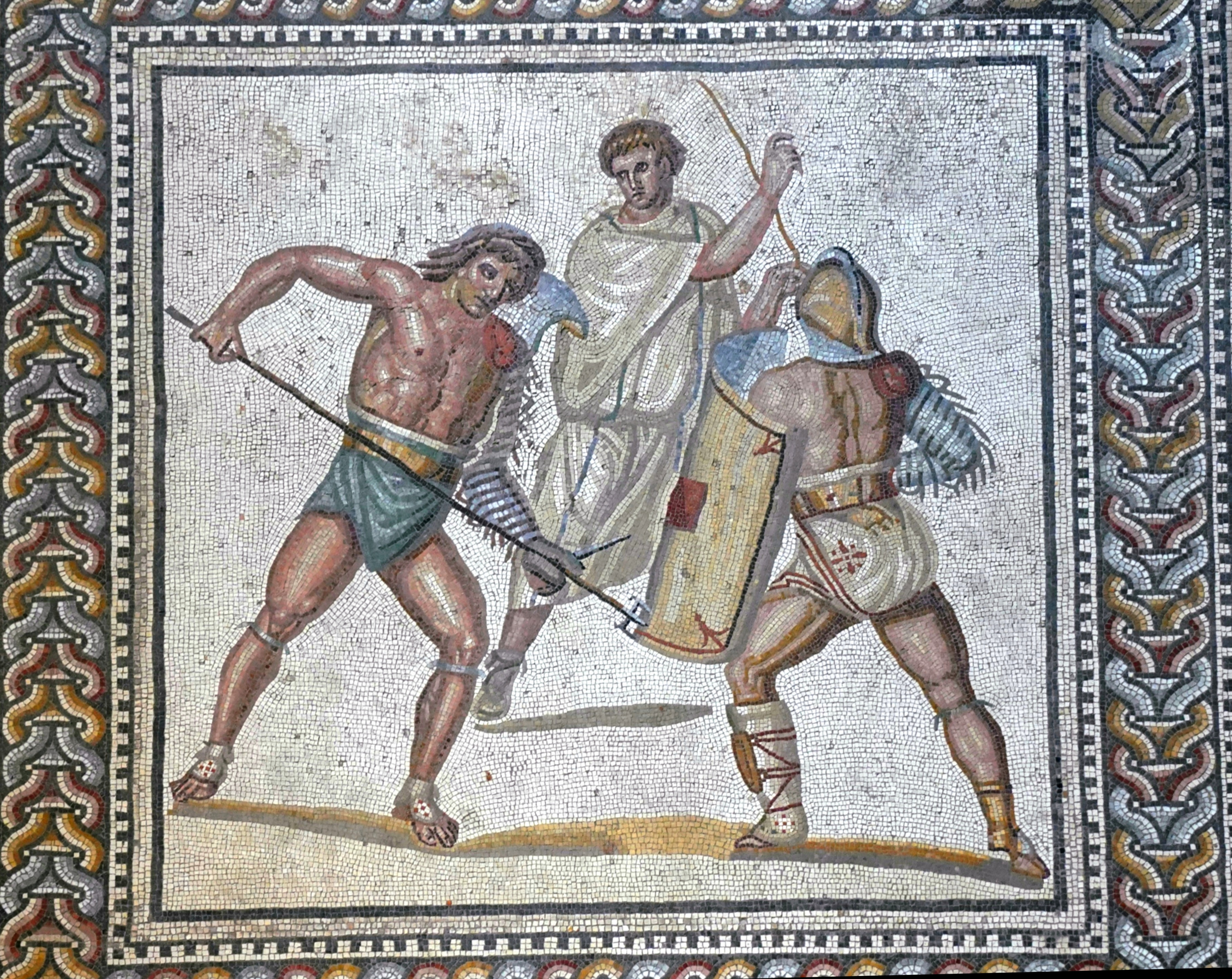
A retiarius gladiator stabs his secutor opponent (Mosaic of Nennig)

== See also ==
- Borg, Saarland
