= Barvaux-Condroz =

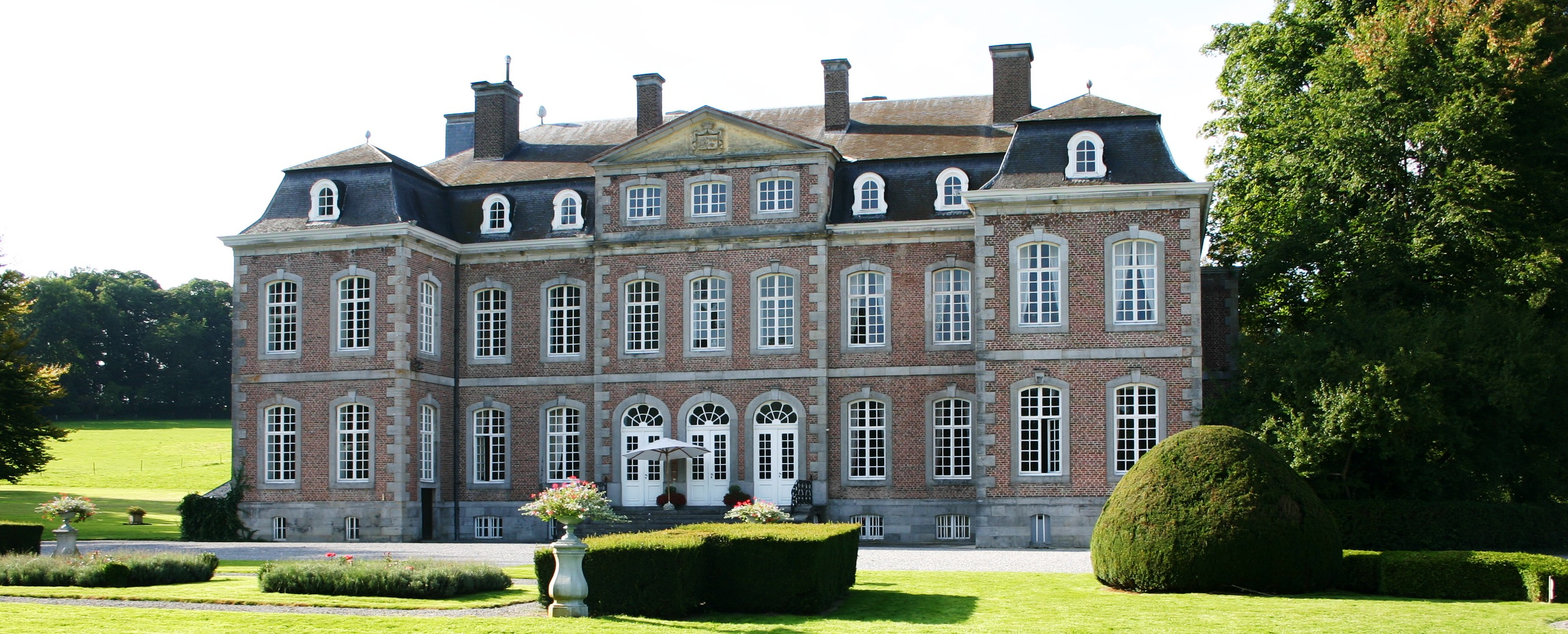
- Barvaux-Condroz, Château de Barvaux-Condroz

- Location within Belgium Location within Europe
- Coordinates: 50°19′46″N 05°15′38″E
- Country: Belgium
- Region: Wallonia
- Province: Namur
- Municipality: Havelange

Barvaux-Condroz is a district of the municipality of Havelange, located in the province of Namur in Wallonia, Belgium.

Remains of Celtic, Roman and Frankish settlements have been discovered in the area. During the Middle Ages, the Aulne Abbey owned land in the village. There are two châteaux in the village, Château de Barvaux-Condroz (its oldest parts dating from the 17th century) and Château de Ramezée (dating from the 18th century).
