= List of protected heritage sites in Havelange =

This table shows an overview of the protected heritage sites in the Walloon town Havelange. This list is part of Belgium's national heritage.

Object	Year/architect	Town/section	Address	Coordinates	Number^{?}	Image
Portal and roofs of castle Porcheresse-Condroz ^{(nl)} ^{(fr)}		Havelange		50.335435°N 5.235367°E	91064-CLT-0001-01 Info	
Froidefontaine Mansion at Barsy, namely the home, the canal, the bridge and gatehouse, ensemble of all buildings and the ensemble formed by the buildings and surrounding land. A protection zone established around the site. ^{(nl)} ^{(fr)}		Havelange		50.385122°N 5.143452°E	91064-CLT-0002-01 Info	Het herenhuis Froidefontaine in Barsy, namelijk het landhuis zelf, de gracht, de brug en poortgebouw, ensemble van alle gebouwen en het ensemble gevormd door de gebouwen en omringende land. Een bescherming zone is ingesteld rond de site
St. Nicholas Chapel and the ensemble formed by the chapel and its environment ^{(nl)} ^{(fr)}		Havelange	Doyon	50.394308°N 5.143373°E	91064-CLT-0003-01 Info	Sint-Nicolaaskapel, te Doyon, en het ensemble gevormd door de kapel en haar omgeving
The oak tree of Gibet and its surroundings ^{(nl)} ^{(fr)}		Havelange	Barvaux-Condroz	50.321216°N 5.277705°E	91064-CLT-0006-01 Info	De Eik van Gibet en dens omgeving, te Barvaux-en-Condroz
The facades and roofs of the old Chantraine Castle and those of the chapel and the ensemble formed by these buildings and the environment ^{(nl)} ^{(fr)}		Havelange		50.352988°N 5.267491°E	91064-CLT-0007-01 Info	
The facades and roofs and the wall on the street side of the farm ^{(nl)} ^{(fr)}		Havelange	rue de la Station	50.387439°N 5.242513°E	91064-CLT-0008-01 Info	De gevels en daken en de muur aan de straatzijde van de boerderij, aan de rue de la Station te Havelange

== See also ==
- List of protected heritage sites in Namur (province)
