= Borg, Saarland =

Borg
- Ortsteil of Perl
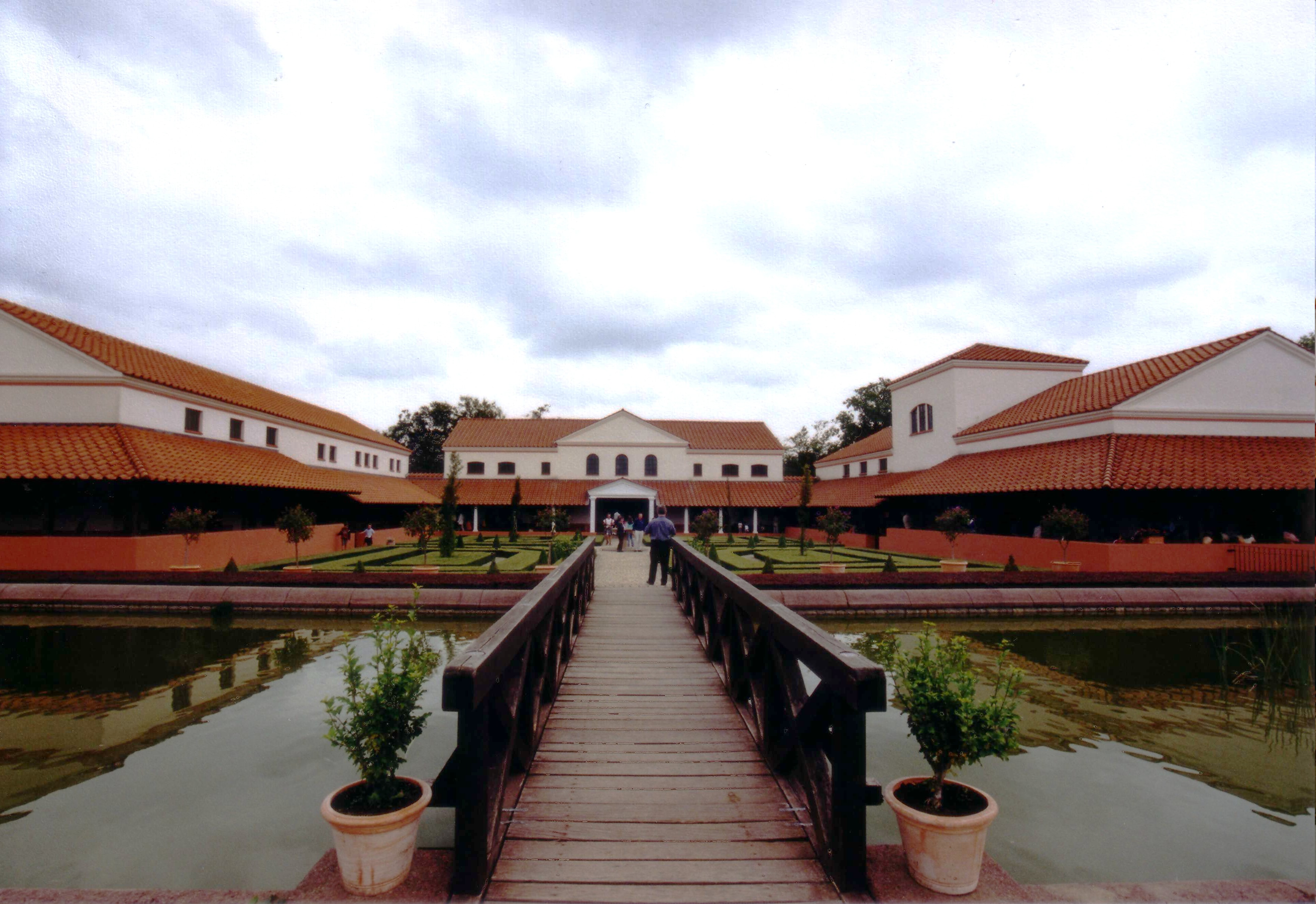
- Roman Villa Borg

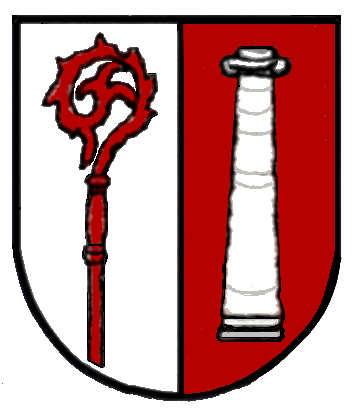
- Coat of arms
- Interactive map of Borg
- Location within Germany Location within Saarland
- Coordinates: 49°28′48″N 06°26′06″E
- Country: Germany
- State: Saarland
- District: Merzig-Wadern
- Municipality: Perl

Area
  - Total: 7.98 km^{2} (3.08 sq mi)
- Elevation: 355 m (1,165 ft)

Population (2014)
  - Total: 395
  - Density: 49.5/km^{2} (128/sq mi)
- Demonym: Borger
- Time zone: UTC+01:00 (CET)
  - Summer (DST): UTC+02:00 (CEST)
- Postal codes: 66706
- Dialling codes: 06866
- Vehicle registration: MZG

Borg is a German village in the municipality of Perl, Saarland. It is located 5 km north east of Perl and 11 km south west of Nennig on the River Mosel. It lies at a height of 355 m and has a population of 370. The nearby Roman Villa Borg is one of the Saarland's most important archaeological sites.

== History ==
Borg is first mentioned in 1569 as being part of the Parish of Perl. However, excavations show that there were much earlier settlements. In 1743, the village was given its own church and a school was built in 1749. Over the years it belonged to St Alban's Charterhouse in Trier, to the dioceses of Metz and Trier, and to the Duchy of Luxembourg. From 1816 to 1840, Borg enjoyed the status of a mayoralty but thereafter came under the jurisdiction of Perl. Pillingerhof, 2 km to the south west, was once a Luxembourg castle but is now an agricultural establishment.

== Church ==
The parish church of St John the Baptist (St. Johannes der Täufer) dates from 1728 but was rebuilt in 1922 by architect Josef Monz from Trier. After suffering damage in World War II, it was again rebuilt by architect H. Ulrich in 1949 to reflect the original plans. The church has three Baroque altars and 10 of the 12 original stones designating the Stations of the Cross.

== See also ==
- Roman Villa Borg
