= Noiseux =

Coordinates: 50.2997°N 5.3742°E

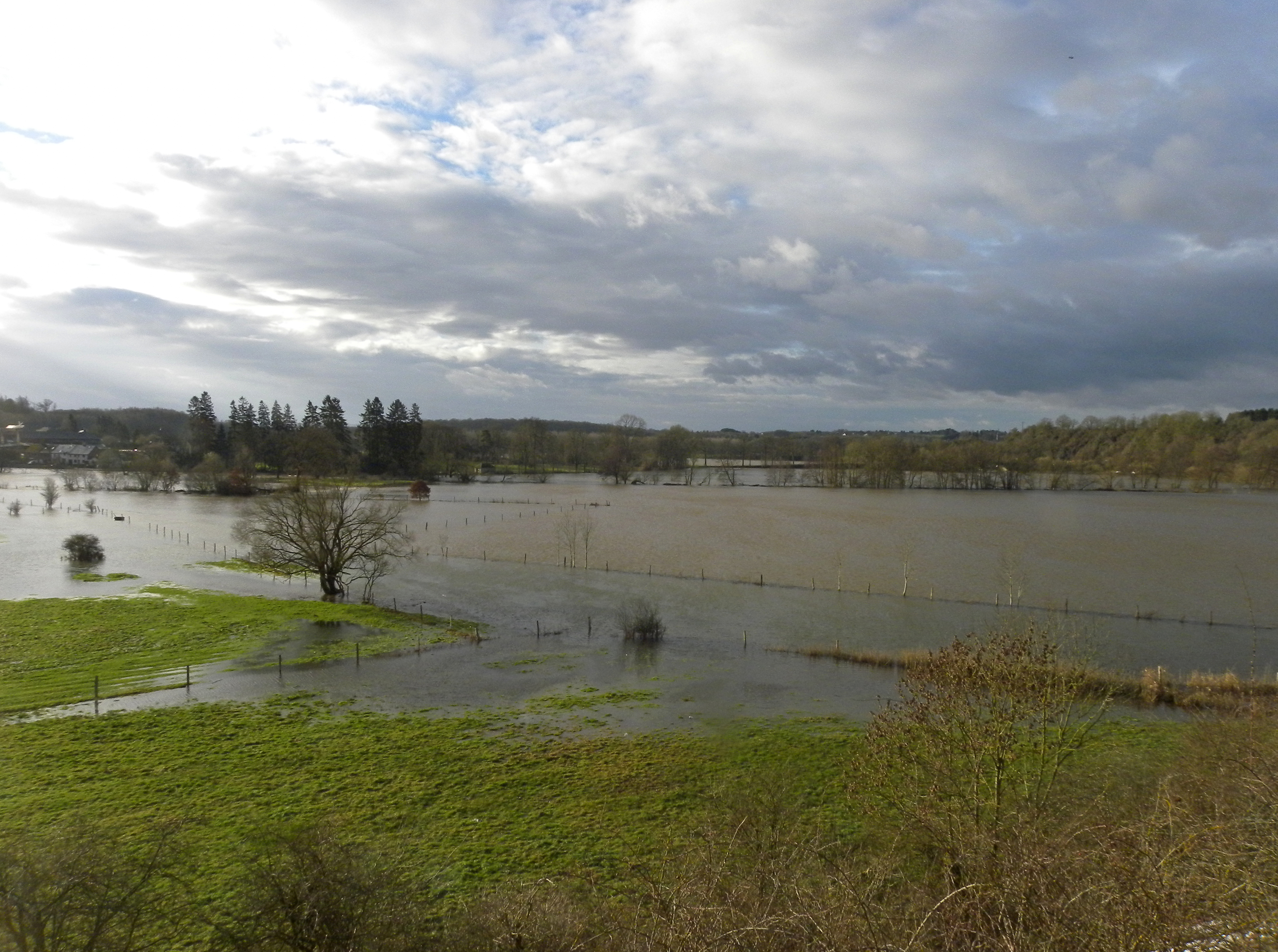
Noiseux

Noiseux (French pronunciation: [nwazø]; Walloon: Nwezeu) is a village of Wallonia and a district of the municipality of Somme-Leuze, located in the province of Namur, Belgium.

Near Noiseux flows the Ourthe river for a short distance through the province of Namur.
