= Heure-en-Famenne =

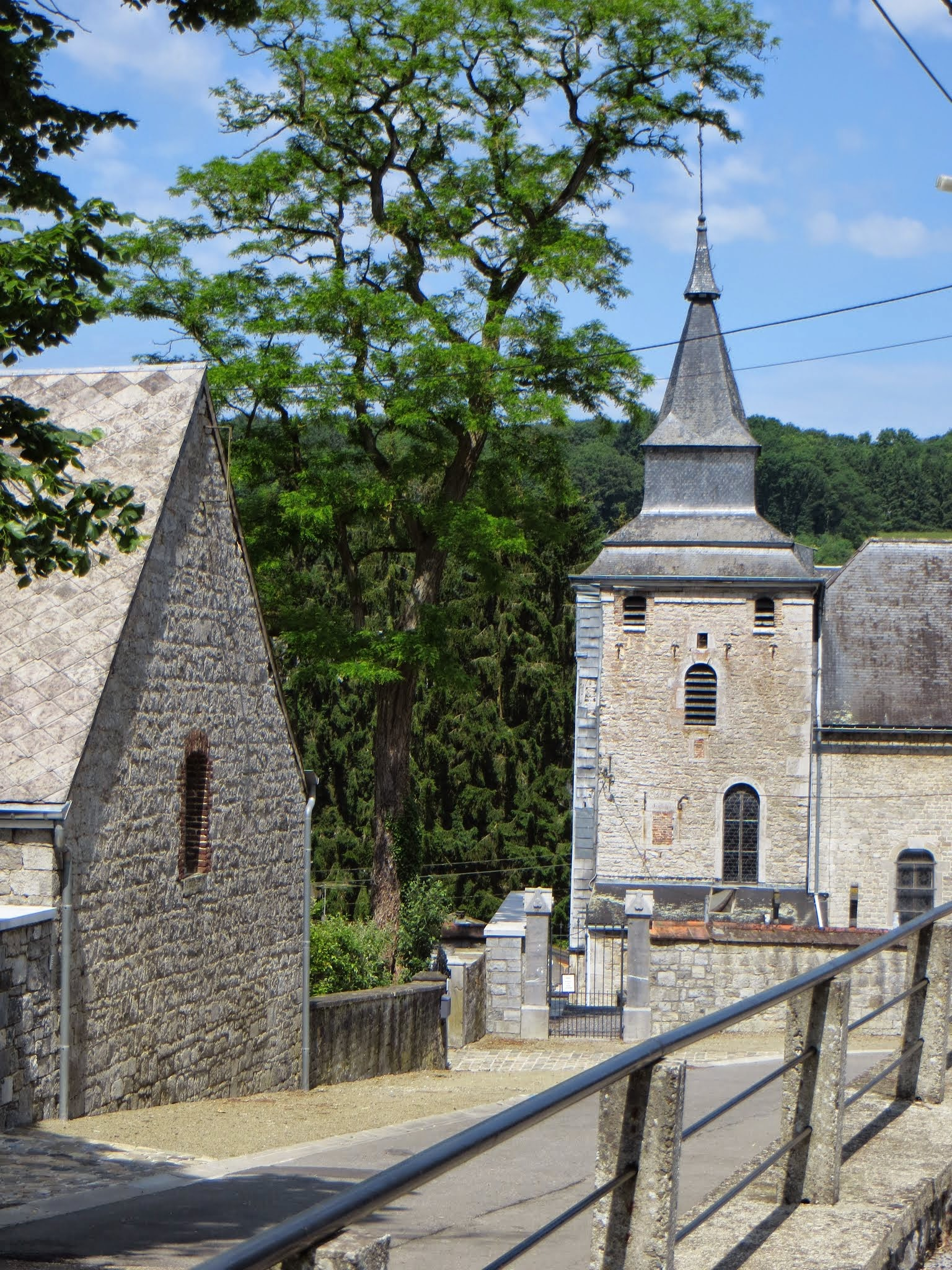
- Heure-en-Famenne

- Location within Belgium Location within Europe
- Coordinates: 50°17′42″N 05°17′42″E
- Country: Belgium
- Region: Wallonia
- Province: Namur
- Municipality: Somme-Leuze

Heure-en-Famenne (French pronunciation: [œʁ ɑ̃ famɛn], lit. 'Heure in Famenne') is a village of Wallonia and a district of the municipality of Somme-Leuze, located in the province of Namur, Belgium.

The location appears to have been inhabited already by the Franks, as a Frankish burial site has been discovered just outside the village. In 876, Louis the German donated a royal estate here to one of his confidants. The village belonged to Waulsort Abbey until 1739. During the 19th century, there were pyrite and lead mines operating in the village. They closed in 1939. The village church dates from the 17th century. In the village there is also a memorial commemorating four civilians shot by German troops in 1914, during World War I and the Rape of Belgium.
