= List of protected heritage sites in Ohey =

This table shows an overview of the protected heritage sites in the Walloon town Ohey. This list is part of Belgium's national heritage.

Object	Year/architect	Town/section	Address	Coordinates	Number^{?}	Image
Ensemble of the farm "La Rochette" ^{(nl)} ^{(fr)}		Ohey		50.410225°N 5.174700°E	92097-CLT-0001-01 Info	
Chapel of Saint-Servais and its furnishings and the fortified farm (north façade and the tower and the two parts of the roof of the building) and the ensemble formed by the buildings and surrounding area ^{(nl)} ^{(fr)}		Ohey		50.426536°N 5.223026°E	92097-CLT-0002-01 Info	
Chapel of Saint-Hubert and the ensemble of the chapel and its surroundings ^{(nl)} ^{(fr)}		Ohey		50.416321°N 5.197093°E	92097-CLT-0004-01 Info	
Ensemble of the farm Vouerie (the house and outbuildings, including the two towers from the 17th century), the old tower of the castle and surrounding area ^{(nl)} ^{(fr)}		Ohey		50.420804°N 5.196309°E	92097-CLT-0005-01 Info	
Castle farm of Baya: exterior, interior of the hall, the dining room, living room, staircase and bedrooms ^{(nl)} ^{(fr)}		Ohey	rue de Baya n°s 18-19	50.461830°N 5.202599°E	92097-CLT-0006-01 Info	
Farm of Perron (facades and roofs) and the chapel of Saint-Pierre ^{(nl)} ^{(fr)}		Ohey	rue du Centre, n°56 à Goesnes (M) et ensemble formé par cette ferme et les terrains environnants (S)	50.441981°N 5.216524°E	92097-CLT-0007-01 Info	
Castle Hodoumont: the castle itself, the buildings along the front yard, the main building of the farm dating from 1612, barn built in 1817 and its outbuildings on two sides (facades and roofs), surrounding walls of the farmhouse and the corner towers, small bridge southwest of the castle walls and terraces on the south and the north slope, pairs of neoclassical columns as gates from roads or meadows around the complex and the ensemble of these buildings and the surrounding land ^{(nl)} ^{(fr)}		Ohey		50.436550°N 5.198957°E	92097-CLT-0009-01 Info	
Chapel of Saint-Hubert ^{(nl)} ^{(fr)}		Ohey		50.416321°N 5.197093°E	92097-PEX-0001-01 Info	
The plaster of the hall and a large living room and three painted ceilings of the castle of Baya ^{(nl)} ^{(fr)}		Ohey		50.461830°N 5.202599°E	92097-PEX-0002-01 Info	
Chapel Saint-Pierre ^{(nl)} ^{(fr)}		Ohey	Goesnes	50.442261°N 5.216740°E	92097-PEX-0003-01 Info	
The site of the castle of Hodoumont and the park, including a stone pyramid, basins connected by a narrow channel flanked by two stone pyramids, the arbor, the avenue of lime trees on the axis of the courtyard, the double avenue of beech trees in the south, and the avenue of lime trees along the road to Goesnes ^{(nl)} ^{(fr)}		Ohey		50.438055°N 5.182808°E	92097-PEX-0004-01 Info	

== See also ==
- List of protected heritage sites in Namur (province)
- Ohey
