= List of protected heritage sites in Somme-Leuze =

This table shows an overview of the protected heritage sites in the Walloon town Somme-Leuze. This list is part of Belgium's national heritage.

Object	Year/architect	Town/section	Address	Coordinates	Number^{?}	Image
Chapel of the "Nativité de la Chapelle de la Vierge " ^{(nl)} ^{(fr)}		Somme-Leuze	Chardeneux (Bonsin)	50.374251°N 5.363696°E	91120-CLT-0001-01 Info	Kapel ('Chapelle de la Nativité de la Vierge')
Tower of the church Saint-Martin ^{(nl)} ^{(fr)}		Somme-Leuze	Bonsin	50.371445°N 5.380373°E	91120-CLT-0002-01 Info	
rural building ^{(nl)} ^{(fr)}		Somme-Leuze	rue du Centre n°33, (actueel: rue de Borlon, n°14), Bonsin	50.372889°N 5.380961°E	91120-CLT-0003-01 Info	
Tower of the church of Notre-Dame ^{(nl)} ^{(fr)}		Somme-Leuze	Heure	50.293528°N 5.296060°E	91120-CLT-0004-01 Info	
St. Martin's Church, churchyard wall and the ensemble formed by the building and the cemetery ^{(nl)} ^{(fr)}		Somme-Leuze	Nettinne	50.291627°N 5.262648°E	91120-CLT-0005-01 Info	Kerk Saint-Martin, kerkhofmuur en het ensemble gevormd door het gebouw en de begraafplaats
Castle Farm, the chapel of Saint-Roch and the ensemble formed by the buildings and surrounding grounds ^{(nl)} ^{(fr)}		Somme-Leuze	rue de Somal n°11	50.329731°N 5.320041°E	91120-CLT-0006-01 Info	

== See also ==
- List of protected heritage sites in Namur (province)
