= Perl, Saarland =

Perl
- Municipality
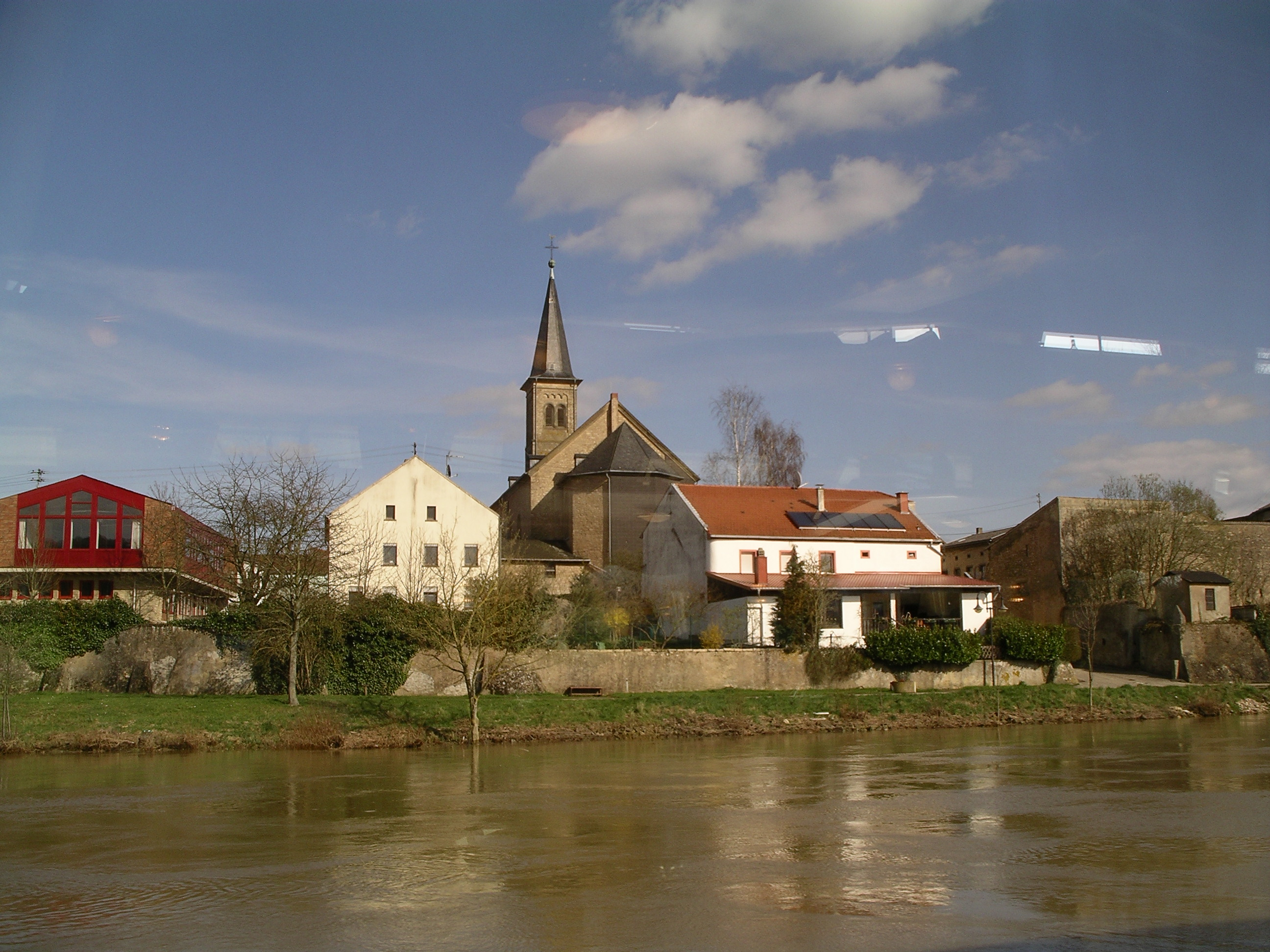

- Coat of arms

- Location of Perl within Merzig-Wadern district
- Interactive map of Perl
- Location within Germany Location within Saarland
- Coordinates: 49°28′N 06°22′E
- Country: Germany
- State: Saarland
- District: Merzig-Wadern

Government
  - Mayor (2015–25): Ralf Uhlenbruch (CDU)

Area
  - Total: 75.24 km^{2} (29.05 sq mi)
- Elevation: 146–429 m (479–1,407 ft)

Population (2025-12-31)
  - Total: 9,405
  - Density: 125.0/km^{2} (323.7/sq mi)
- Time zone: UTC+01:00 (CET)
  - Summer (DST): UTC+02:00 (CEST)
- Postal codes: 66706
- Dialling codes: 06867
- Vehicle registration: MZG
- Website: Official website

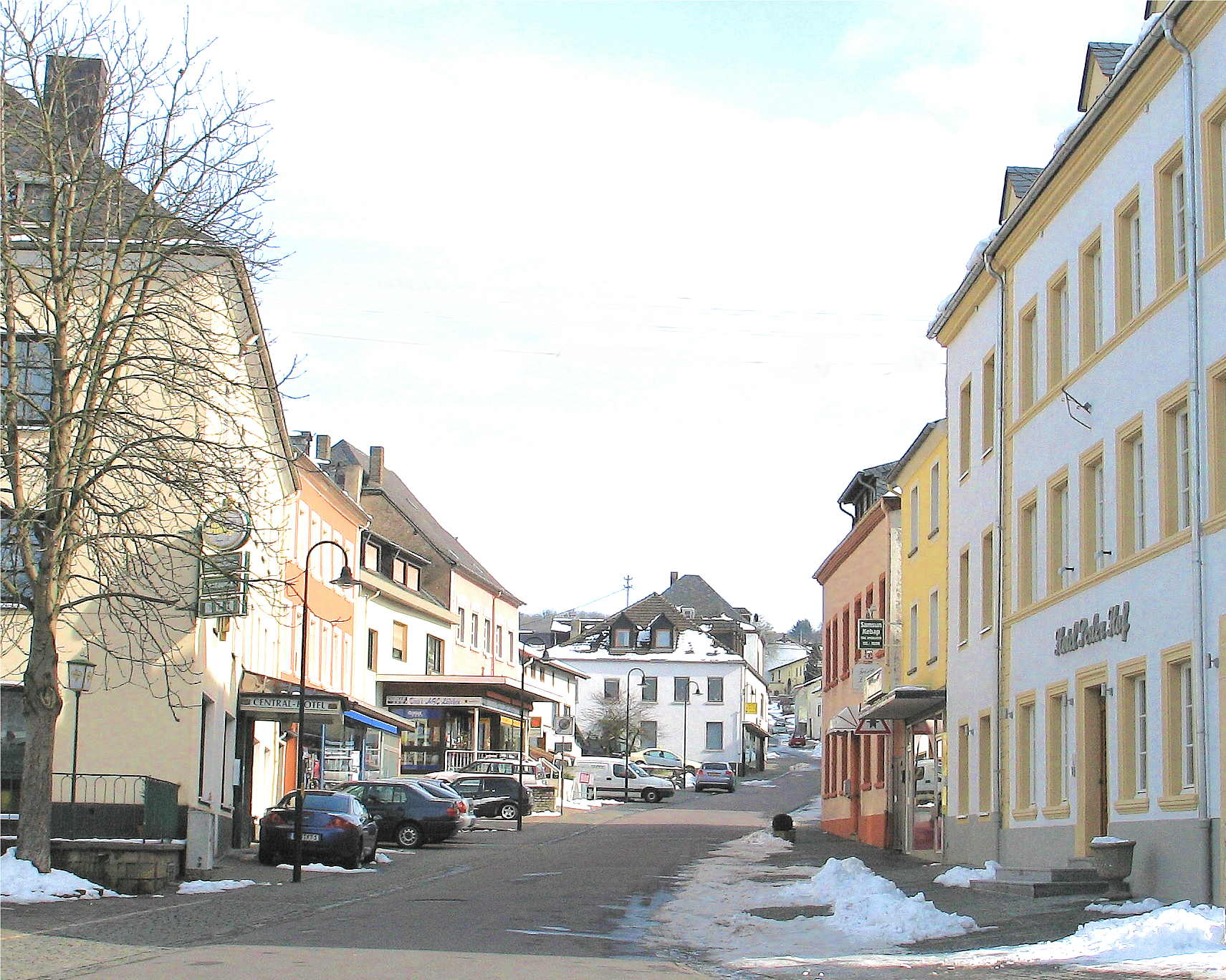
A road in Perl

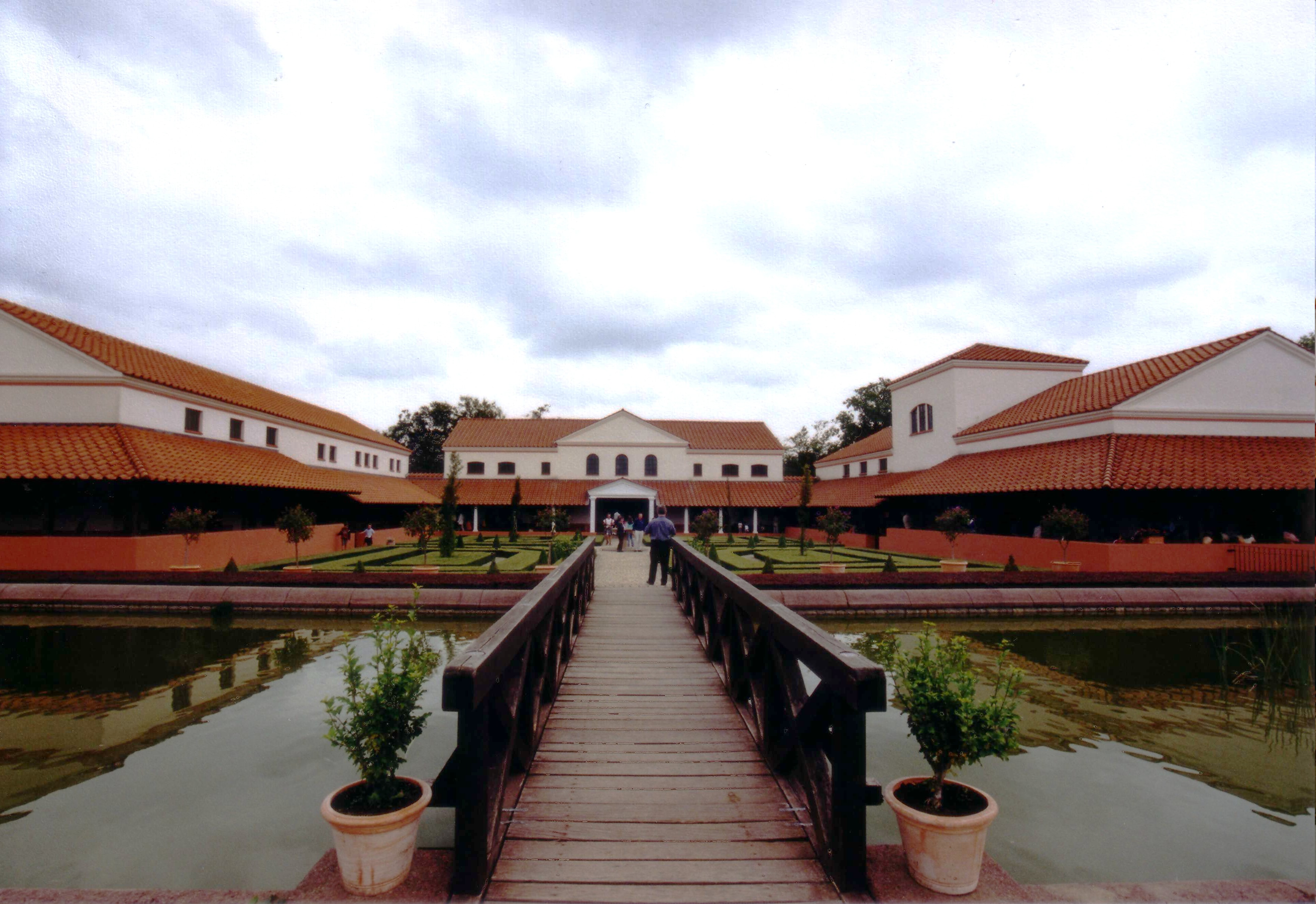
The Roman Villa Borg

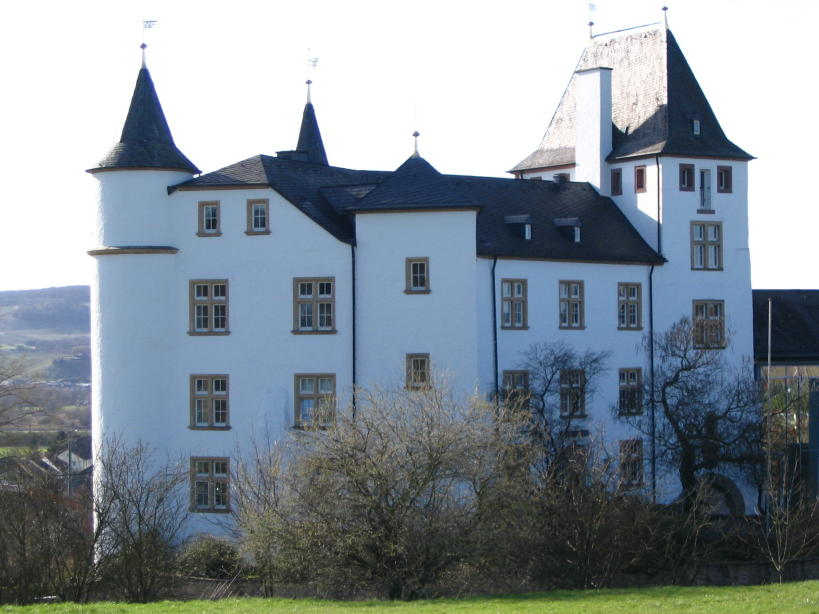
The Schloss Berg at Nennig

Perl (German pronunciation: [pɛʁl]) is a municipality in Merzig-Wadern, Saarland, Germany. In 2020 its population was 8,824.

== Geography ==
=== Overview ===
It is situated on the right bank of the river Moselle, on the border with Luxembourg and France, approximately 25 km southeast of Luxembourg City. It is joined by a bridge across the Moselle with Schengen in Luxembourg and by a second bridge between Nennig and Remich. A fine Roman mosaic has been found in the village of Nennig.

=== Subdivision ===
The municipality consists of Perl and 13 villages (Ortsteil):

Arms	Village	Area (km^{2})	Population (2010)
	Perl	2.96	2,129
	Besch	7.82	1,304
	Borg	7.98	390
	Büschdorf	4.23	303
	Eft-Hellendorf	9.92	312
	Keßlingen	2.34	126
	Münzingen	1.78	50
	Nennig	9.73	1,149
	Oberleuken	7.14	544
	Oberperl	3.05	483
	Sehndorf	2.73	227
	Sinz	6.72	331
	Tettingen-Butzdorf	4.77	374
	Wochern	3.88	188

== Administration ==
- 1989–2007 : Anton Hoffmann, CDU
- 2007–2015 : Bruno Schmitt, SPD
- 2015–present : Ralf Uhlenbruch, CDU

== Education ==
There have been schools in the municipality of Perl for several centuries, with the oldest schooling and school building records dating back to the year 1743. The Deutsch-Luxemburgisches Schengen-Lyzeum Perl is the first cross-border grammar school which offers both the German and Luxembourg diplomas.

=== Day care centres ===
- Day Care St. Franziskus Besch
- Day Care Center St. Martin Nennig
- Day Care Center St. Quirinus Perl
- Day Care Center Leukbachtal Oberleuken

=== Primary school ===
- Primary school Dreiländereck Perl

=== Grammar school ===
- German-Luxembourgish Schengen-Lyzeum Perl

== Main sights ==
=== Roman mosaic floor ===
The Roman mosaic in Nennig is the second largest mosaic north of the Alps, with a size of 160 m^{2}. It was rebuilt in 1874 and restored in 1960. The mosaic has a 15.65 m × 10.30 m large, ornamental decorated surface, which is a gem that exceeds all mosaics that have been found in the Moselle region in Roman palaces and mansions.

=== Roman Villa Borg ===
The Roman Villa Borg has been reconstructed faithfully with lobbies, public baths, gardens and Roman tavern and also displays archaeological finds. Original recipes of the Roman gourmet Apicius are used for cooking.

=== Palace von Nell and parc von Nell ===
In 1733 the hereditary tenant of the Trier Cathedral Chapter constructed a stately house (palace), which later fell into the possession of a family from Nell. The residential building is a nine-axle, two-storey building with a front length of 24.30 m and a high kerb roof. Opposite the palace is a garden portal with a double-barreled external staircase that leads to the "Parc of Nell", which was transformed to a Baroque garden as part of the project "Gärten ohne Grenzen".

=== Besch military cemetery ===
The military cemetery commemorates the fallen of the Second World War. Three large stone crosses stand atop a blown up bunker. The cemetery is the last resting place of 1279 German dead and also 950 war victims of other nations.

=== Schloss Berg ===
Schloss Berg in Nennig consists of a lower and upper castle. The lower castle is private property and the upper castle has been rebuilt as the Renaissance-Schloss. Today it is a luxury hotel, a gourmet restaurant and a modern casino.

== Personalities ==
=== Born in Perl ===
- Karl Eduard Heusner (1843–1891), Vice Admiral
- Albert Grégoire (1865–1949), Member of the Reichstag
- Nikolaus Simmer (1902–1986), politician (NSDAP) and mayor of Koblenz (1940–1945)
- Aloysius Winter (1931–2011), professor of theology
- Karl Peter Fixemer (born 1931), Entrepreneur
- Rudolf Heinz (born 1937), philosopher, psychoanalyst and musicologist
- Edmund Kütten (born 1948), politician, member of parliament (since 2004)

=== Connected to Perl ===
- Christian Bau (born 1971), chef
