= Chardeneux =

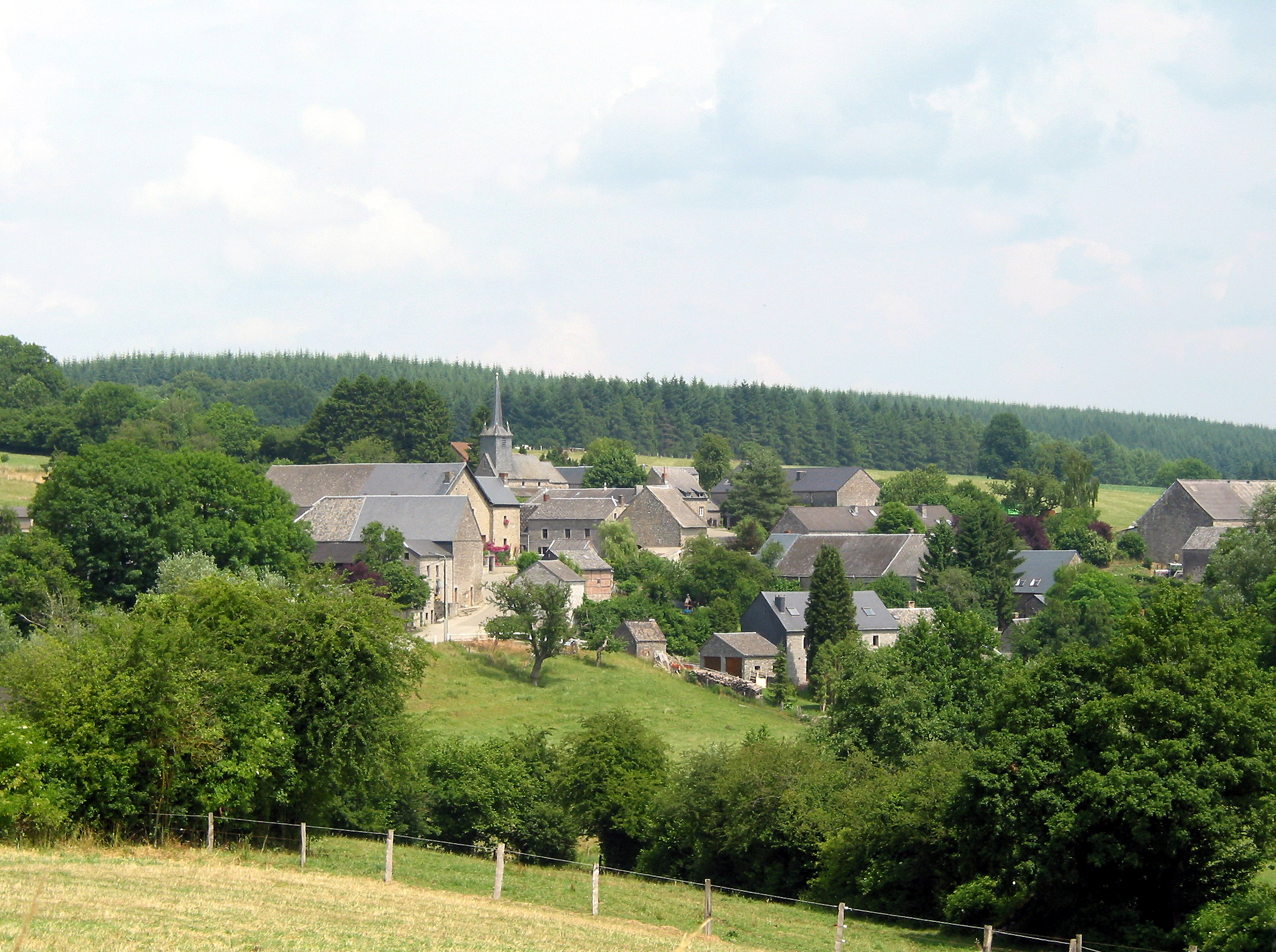

- Location in Belgium
- Coordinates: 50°22′N 05°22′E
- Country: Belgium
- Region: Wallonia
- Province: Namur
- Municipality: Somme-Leuze

Chardeneux (French pronunciation: [ʃaʁdənø]) is a village of Wallonia, part of the district of Bonsin, in the municipality of Somme-Leuze, located in the province of Namur, Belgium.

Chardeneux is a member of the Les Plus Beaux Villages de Wallonie ("The Most Beautiful Villages of Wallonia") association. The village has a Romanesque church and the village houses, from the 18th and 19th centuries, display a uniformity of style typical for the Condroz region.
