= Tahier =

- Tahier, 17th-century fortified farm

- Location within Belgium Location within Europe
- Coordinates: 50°25′37″N 05°13′17″E
- Country: Belgium
- Region: Wallonia
- Province: Namur
- Municipality: Ohey

Tahier is a hamlet of the village of Évelette, Wallonia located in the municipality of Ohey, province of Namur, Belgium.

The village contains a chapel dedicated to Saint Servais from the 11th century, restored in the 18th century. There is also a fortified farm complex from the first half of the 17th century in the village.
