= Roman Villa Borg =

Archaeological museum in Germany

Coordinates: 49°29′47″N 6°27′29″E

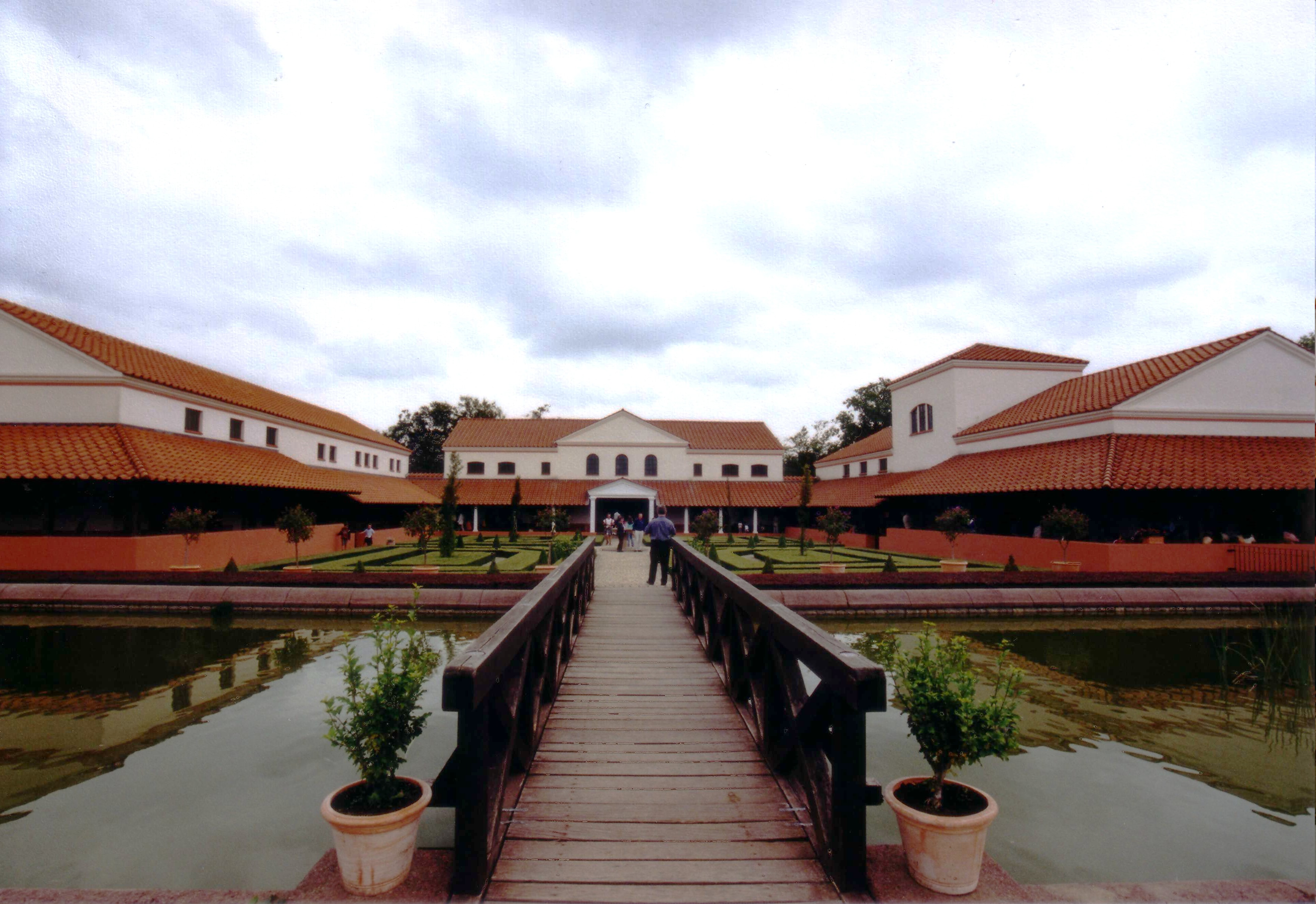
The reconstructed Roman Villa Borg

The Roman Villa Borg is a reconstructed Roman villa rustica located near the villages of Borg and Oberleuken in the municipality of Perl in Saarland, Germany. Discovered at the end of the 19th century, the site was excavated in the late 1980s. Reconstruction work, which began in the mid-1990s, was virtually completed in late 2008 although further excavation work is still continuing. The site is a popular tourist attraction with some 50,000 visitors per year.

== History ==
It was Johann Schneider, a local schoolteacher, who around the year 1900 first came across the site after noticing unnatural mounds in the area. He soon discovered the remains of walls as well as Roman pottery. Partly as a result of the World Wars, little was done until the mid-1980s when the Saarland authorities fenced the site off after illegal excavations started to threaten its survival. Systematic excavation work began in 1987. The excavations soon revealed evidence of pre-Roman inhabitation directly below the foundations of the Roman villa. Not only were there traces of Iron Age structures but also of Beaker culture settlements. Tools dating from the Neolithic period were also found on the site.

== The site ==
The site is that of a villa rustica or agricultural facility consisting of a large palatial residence or pars urbana and a pars rustica or economic area. There had been very little activity on the site since Roman times with the result that the Roman remains are still in very good condition.

== Reconstruction ==
Reconstruction work was designed to present an authentic representation of the buildings as they originally stood so that visitors could better appreciate archaeology and antiquity. In addition to the findings of excavation work, similar sites (such as Echternach in Luxembourg) were taken into account as was pertinent ancient (e.g. Vitruvius) and modern literature. The reconstructed buildings now stand on the Roman foundation walls, revealing their probable appearance in the 2nd to 3rd century.

The current buildings comprise: the baths which are fully functional consisting of a frigidarium (cold bath), caldarium (hot bath) and tepidarium (tempered bath) together with latrines, a dressing room and a relaxation area; the manor or main building with a large reception hall and a number of adjacent rooms in which the most important finds from the site are displayed; the Roman kitchen (completed in 2008); a residential building; and a tavern, which was not part of the original villa but which serves meals based on ancient Roman recipes.

== The gardens ==
The gardens, which have been designed as authentically as possible on the basis of pollen analysis and relevant literature, consist of a herb garden with spices and remedial plants as well as a kitchen garden with fruits and vegetables. The rose garden and the inner court garden are also based on Roman models and give an idea of Roman garden architecture with their fountains and footpaths.

== Annual Roman days ==
The "Roman Days" (Römertage), a weekend with shows of Roman-era historical reenactment, have been held annually at the villa for one weekend in August since 1997.
