= Havelange =

Municipality in Wallonia, Belgium

Havelange Havlondje (Walloon)
- Municipality
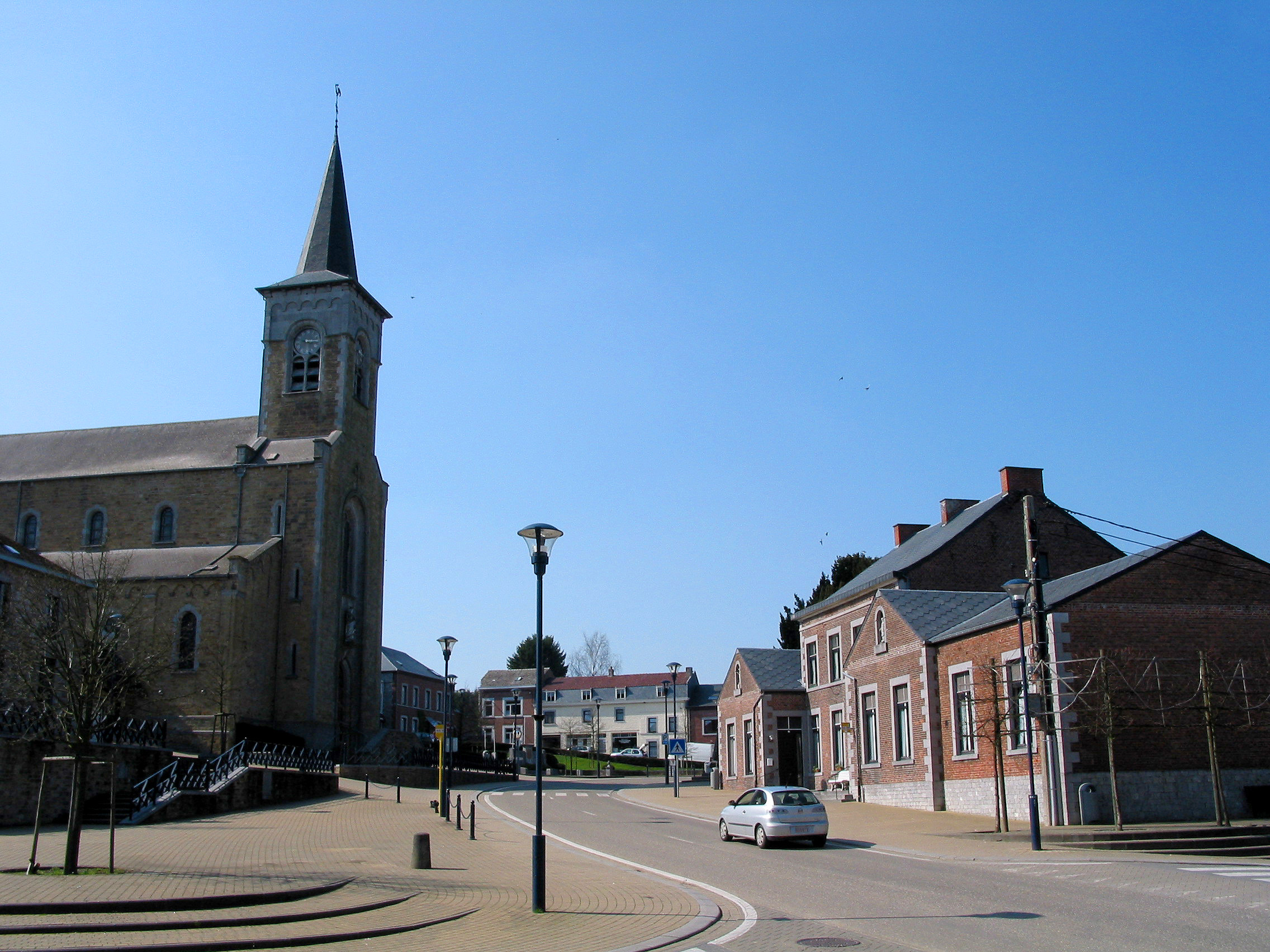

- Flag Coat of arms

- Location of Havelange in Namur province
- Interactive map of Havelange
- Location in Belgium
- Coordinates: 50°23′N 05°15′E
- Country: Belgium
- Community: French Community
- Region: Wallonia
- Province: Namur
- Arrondissement: Dinant

Government
  - Mayor: Nathalie Demoulin-Demanet
  - Governing party: HAV'ENIR - Ecolo

Area
  - Total: 104.73 km^{2} (40.44 sq mi)

Population (2018-01-01)
  - Total: 5,130
  - Density: 49.0/km^{2} (127/sq mi)
- Postal codes: 5370, 5372, 5374, 5376
- NIS code: 91064
- Area codes: 083
- Website: www.havelange.be

Havelange (French pronunciation: [avlɑ̃ʒ]; Walloon: Havlondje) is a municipality of Wallonia located in the province of Namur, Belgium.

On 1 January 2006 the municipality had 4,844 inhabitants. The total area is 104.73 km^{2}, giving a population density of 45 inhabitants per km^{2}.

== Other centres ==
Apart from Havelange itself, the municipality also comprises the following districts :

- Barvaux-Condroz, including the eponymous castle, still owned by the noble Aspremont-Lynden family
- Flostoy, including the hamlet of Bormenville and its castle
- Jeneffe
- Maffe
- Méan
- Miécret
- Porcheresse
- Verlée

== See also ==
- List of protected heritage sites in Havelange
