= Baillonville =

Baillonville Bayonveye (Walloon)
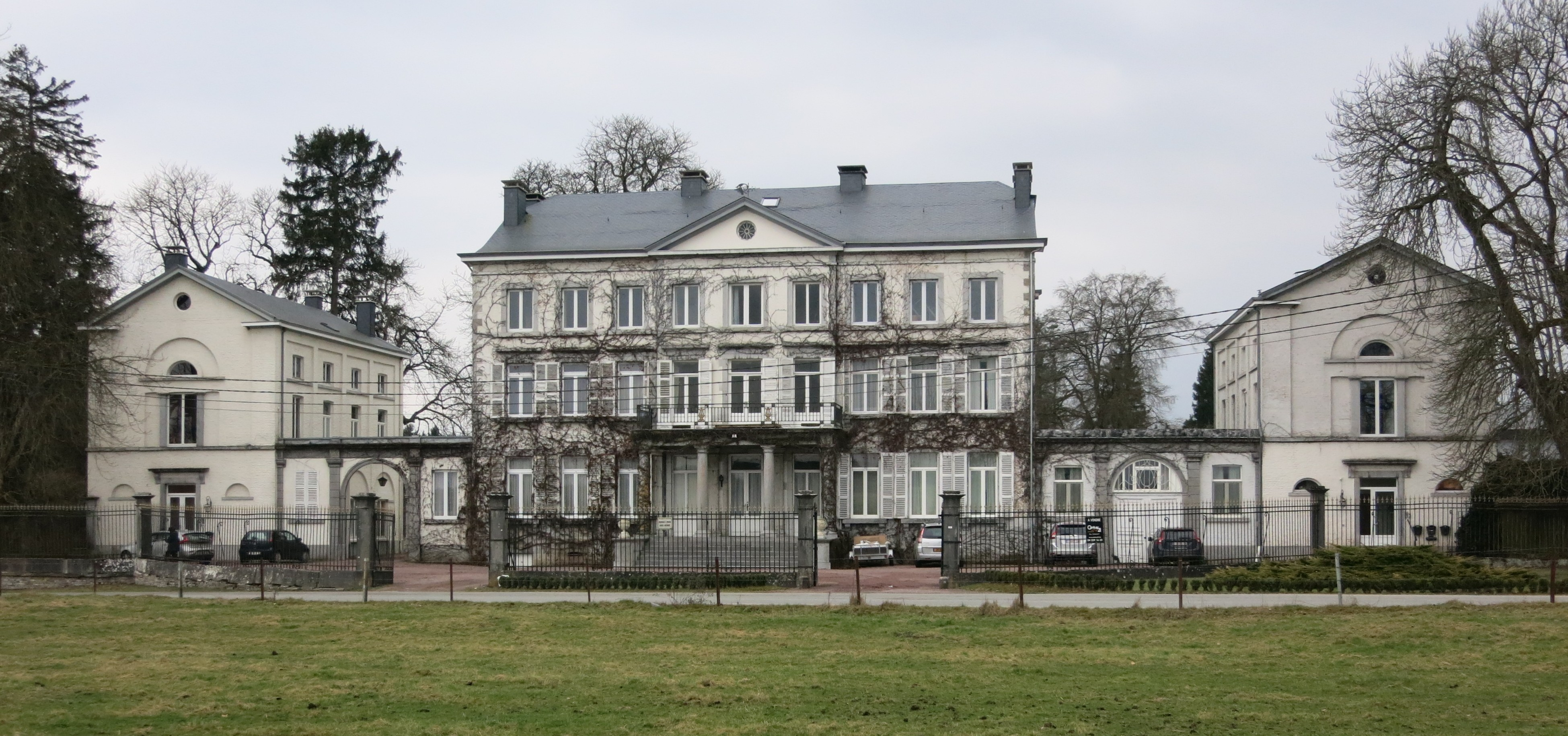
- Château de Baillonville

- Location within Belgium Location within Europe
- Coordinates: 50°25′37″N 05°13′17″E
- Country: Belgium
- Region: Wallonia
- Province: Namur
- Municipality: Somme-Leuze

Baillonville (French pronunciation: [bajɔ̃vil]; Walloon: Bayonveye) is a village of Wallonia and a district of the municipality of Somme-Leuze, located in the province of Namur, Belgium.

From the early Middle Ages until 1706, the village belonged to the Prince-Bishopric of Liège. The ownership then passed between several aristocratic families until the French Revolution. The village contains the Château de Baillonville, built in 1806 in a Neoclassical style. The village church, dedicated to Saint Hubert, has Romanesque foundations. There is also a chapel from 1895 with a memorial plaque honouring American troops who fought here during the Battle of the Bulge in 1944.
