= Roman villas in northwestern Gaul =

Roman villas in northwestern Gaul (modern France) functioned as colonial economic centers. Most villas did not resemble the luxurious, aristocratic country retreats of the Mediterranean region. Their owners were absentee investors (or the emperor himself), managed by local Gauls whose families were rewarded after the Gallo-Roman wars.

It is difficult for archeologists to define a villa; the recovered residences varied in size and style (often determined by economic function). However, all sites designated as "villas" contain Roman architectural elements found in homes (such as mosaics, porticos, columns and square grounds plans).

At first the new Roman masters physically changed very little in Gaul, simply refining the rural economic system in an already intensely farmed landscape. These refinements took the form of technological improvements and enhancing the economic structure (which included the transport of goods and raw materials to larger markets).

== Gauls (Celts) ==
The Gauls (Celts who lived in Gaul) were a culture rather than a race, nation or empire. They were skilled in metalworking and cattle-raising. The culture began to dominate France around 800 BCE, replacing the existing culture (but not the people).

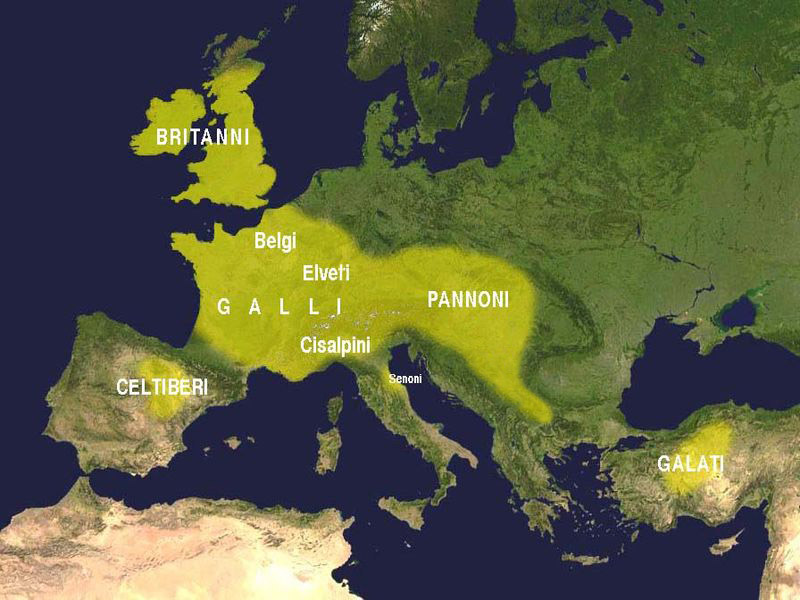
Celts in the third century BC

The Celtic landscape resembled a countryside, with open fields instead of woods; however, Celtic fields were smaller (often square). More fields were used for pasture than for crops because of the need for cattle, sheep and forage. The Gauls intensely managed the forest for wood and forest products; the Romans enhanced the system without dramatically altering it.

Villages and hamlets were denser in the countryside during the Roman period; the population (equal to that at the time of Louis XIV) was about 20 million. At this time, Roman Britain's population of four to six million equaled later-medieval numbers. Homes were better constructed than most houses built during the Middle Ages; they were built with local materials: timber uprights with plaited wicker, coated with clay, straw, and animal hair.

== Roman conquest and colonization ==
Julius Caesar and his Roman legions succeeded in their conquest of Gaul from 57 to 52 BCE at the invitation of Gauls in Marseille, who asked the Romans to come to their defense.

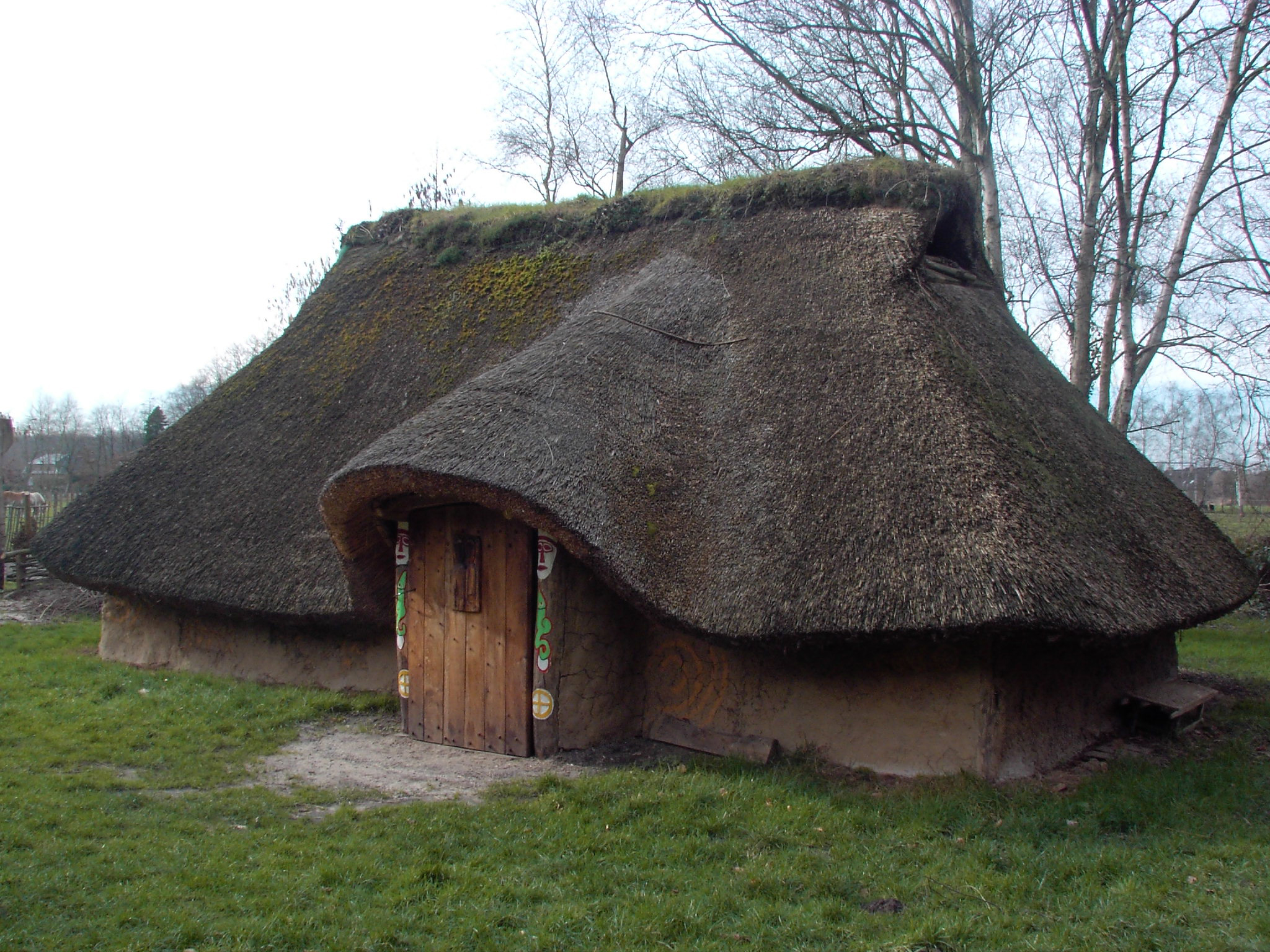
Pre-Roman Gaul home

The Romans occupied and managed their empire with a minimum of administrators, no police force and an army primarily located on the frontiers (much like the French colonial empire of the 17th and 18th centuries. A few Roman natives lived in major towns, but most governmental and economic functions were carried out by local Gauls. This "minimalist empire" left most people and institutions untouched. New Roman settlements were relatively few; if one paid their taxes and kept the peace, life did not change much during the early centuries of occupation.

The primary early-Roman modifications were technological improvements and links to a market economy, which often meant new Roman roads and supplies for the Roman army. The major technological addition was a bigger plough (possibly invented in Gaul), which could break up the heavier soil. This new plough cut deeper into the soil, and the ploughman could regulate its depth. It was usually pulled by four to eight oxen, and had three parts:

- Coulter: Knife-like vertical iron blade
- Ploughshare: Blade which cut horizontally through grass roots
- Mouldboard: Turned the soil to one side

The results of these innovations were longer fields (suitable for large estates) and population growth (with the additional food produced).

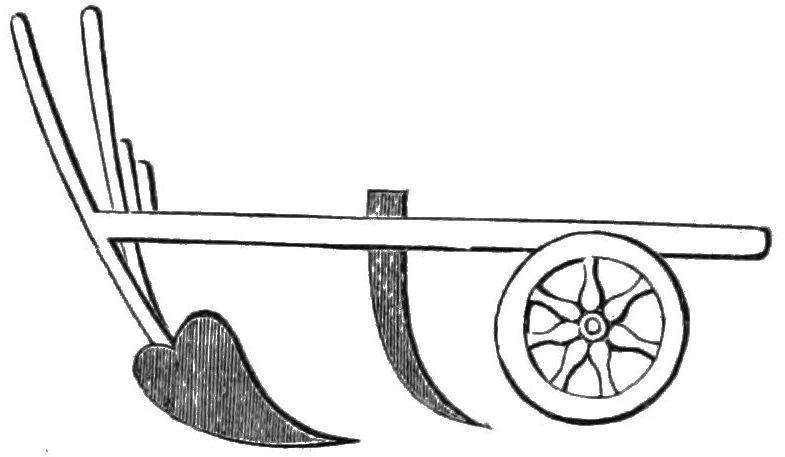
Wheeled plough from the Roman Empire

Roman investors (possibly living in North Africa) bought and sold land, using local Gallic lords to manage the new villa system. These managers built the villas we find today, which historians call a romanitas (Romanized Gallic villa). These Gauls created a wide variety of homes, from two-room cottages to palaces more in keeping with the Roman ideal of life (evidenced in mosaics, columns and other typically Roman features). This romanitas was the passport to a new world of consumer goods, prestige and advancement: urban luxury in the countryside.

== Locations ==
Originally, historians believed Roman villas to be primarily near urban centers and major roads; their view of the villas stressed their economic autonomy, since transport over land was expensive and slow (even with the improvement of Roman roads throughout Gaul).

Today, scholars believe that the villas were linked to a broader empire economy through a system of secondary (and tertiary) Roman roads. These roads were sometimes built (or maintained) by villa owners, especially if the road crossed an owner's land. Owners often hired surveyors, geologists and labourers for the work.

Villa sites were places of previous occupation over hundreds (and possibly thousands) of years to reuse stone, water sources, raw materials and transportation links (roads and waterways). In pre-Roman Gaul, tribal areas were divided into parcels approximately the size of a parish (pagi). Each pagus usually had a village at its center, and sometimes Iron Age settlements relocated closer to a Roman road.

An adequate water source was the primary site-location factor for a villa. Deep wells were often dug to ensure enough drinking and cleaning water for the family, laborers and livestock. Clean water was also essential for watermills and (eventually) baths, the Roman indicator of a fully civilized life.

== Types ==
Archaeologists have had difficulties defining villas, since there were a number of local, regional and functional variations. Villa sizes ranged from two rooms to several acres (for rambling houses). The word "villa" sometimes refers to an architectural style with residential, urban Roman features such as porticos and columns.

Most villas were food-production operations made up of cultivated fields, meadows and forest, with timber use important. Watermills, cowsheds, corn driers, wine cellars and kilns were typical farm buildings. Villas produced wool, leather and tallow in addition to food. Hunting, fowling and fishing were sources of protein. Beef was important in northern France, and pork in the south; sheep were more common outside the villas. The transport of produce overland was once thought to be too expensive, but amphorae and delicate ceramics were carried across North Africa (causing archeologists to reconsider ancient logistics).

Although Romans used barges (towed up rivers by oxen, horses, or slaves) on the Rhone River, it is unknown if the same system was used on the smaller rivers of Lower Normandy. Right-of-way would need to be secured by the state, and a clear riverside track would need to be maintained.

Some Roman villas engaged in industrial production in addition to food and other essentials. These included:

- Tile works: The correct type of clay and a sizable forest (for fuel) were required. Most French forests in existence today existed during the Gallo-Roman period.
- Horse farms
- Health spa: Containing a large swimming pool (or bath)
- Salt works: On the coast, usually owned by the emperor
- Pottery kilns: Similar requirements to tile works, producing amphorae and mass-produced table and kitchenware (such as the popular red ware—terra sigilata—for long-distance trade. Local ceramics for cooking, eating and religious figurines were also produced for consumption.
- Stone quarries: The hard work demanded slave labor (often criminals), requiring soldiers and tighter security.
- Mining: Precious metals were eventually controlled by the emperor. Community entrepreneurs or private associations controlled most other mines, but all mining (including quarries) was noted for its life-shortening slave work. Most mines were short-lived, located near small villages.
- Imperial estates: The civil service or the army administered the emperor's villas.

All villas paid predetermined income and inheritance taxes (tributum) in cash. Materials sold to the army (most commonly leather and corn), were processed on-site. The results were then sent through the empire's posting stations (mansion) to the northern frontier. All industrial villas bought food, iron for tools, wood and other materials locally, hiring local labor.

== Labor ==
Slave-based villas existed in large numbers (especially after the wars of conquest), but were not dominant; free peasants and tenant farmers working for villas were common as well. The primary source of slaves was war, but abandoned-property owners were also rounded up and treated as slaves.

Slaves were considered expensive assets, and treated accordingly. Sometimes several hundred slaves served a medium-sized villa. They were treated as thinking, self-motivated “instruments” with a variety of skills. Owners were firm but tolerant, admonishing and encouraging with small rewards. Women specialized in a number of jobs: cooks, hairdressers, weavers and laundresses.

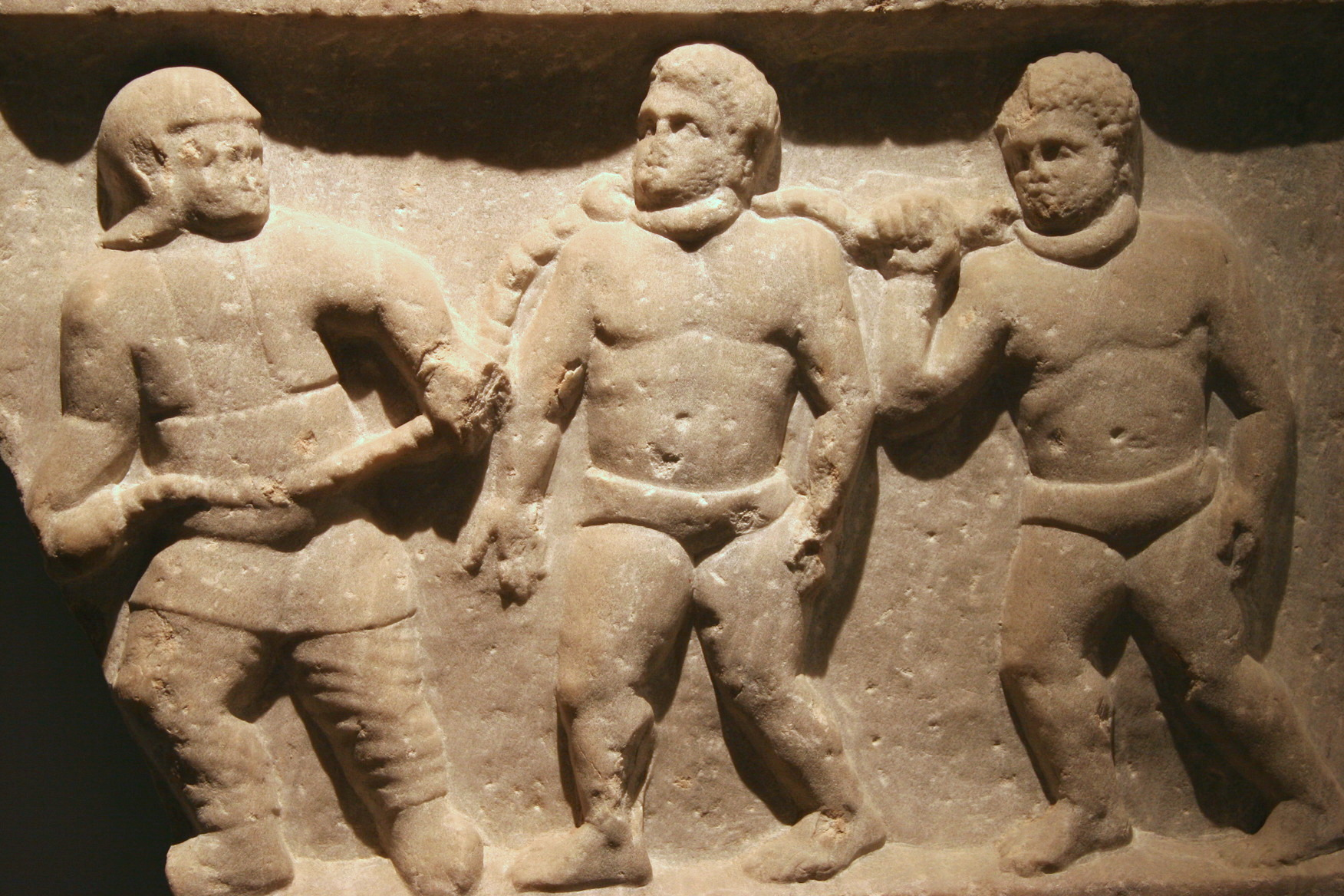
Roman slaves and free laborers were used on villa estates.

After periods of political upheaval, a father's job legally bound his son to the same work. The Roman institution of slavery in the empire also provided other options. Many were freed for good service, an incentive. There were also opportunities to earn bonuses and buy freedom. A promising young slave might attend the children's lessons; an owner could cultivate his own secretaries, accountants, administrators, and tutors and rent them out. The emperor's slaves were insiders in the wealth system, and could become wealthy themselves.

By the end of the second century BCE, 80 percent of the population consisted of emancipated slaves or their descendants. After the wars of expansion, as the slave pool dried up villas converted to tenant or employed laborers. By the end of the empire most slaves worked in domestic service as the owners’ private staff, rather than as laborers on the estates.

== Architecture ==
Over five centuries, the villa took on many forms. It sometimes began as a simple cottage, which became embedded in a complex of additions; large investor colonial villas were also designed and built, fully formed. Near the empire's end, villas became smaller and more numerous.

The classic great villa consisted of a main house with a veranda (or porch) overlooking two rows of buildings (or wings). These were often not parallel, diverging to enhance the effect of distance. The rooms were connected by the veranda, which acted as a hall. Each room had a different function, and all offered little privacy. Some villas were several rooms deep and lit by a clerestory, or dormer windows. Thick walls indicate villas which could have been two or three stories tall, with attics for storage.

Although fireplaces with hoods have been found, most heating was by braziers burning charcoal or coal. Rarely, a central room was heated by hypocausts (under-floor hot air from fires beneath the house). The venting ran up the walls of the villa, emptying under the roof eaves. This source of venting made the home appear to be on fire because of the smoke billowing from the roof edges and walls.

Kitchens were unsophisticated, featuring a masonry hearth with a charcoal fire. Coals would have been scraped into a pile, and a portable grill would hold a pot to simmer or grill meat. Kitchens were often near baths, since both required water; they were detached (or at the end of a building) due to the risk of fire. Some kitchen fireplace ovens used refractory brick, which allowed heat to be gradually released into an adjoining room (a library, study or storage room for drying split wood or wine being artificially aged). Kitchen ceilings were high, again to reduce the fire risk.

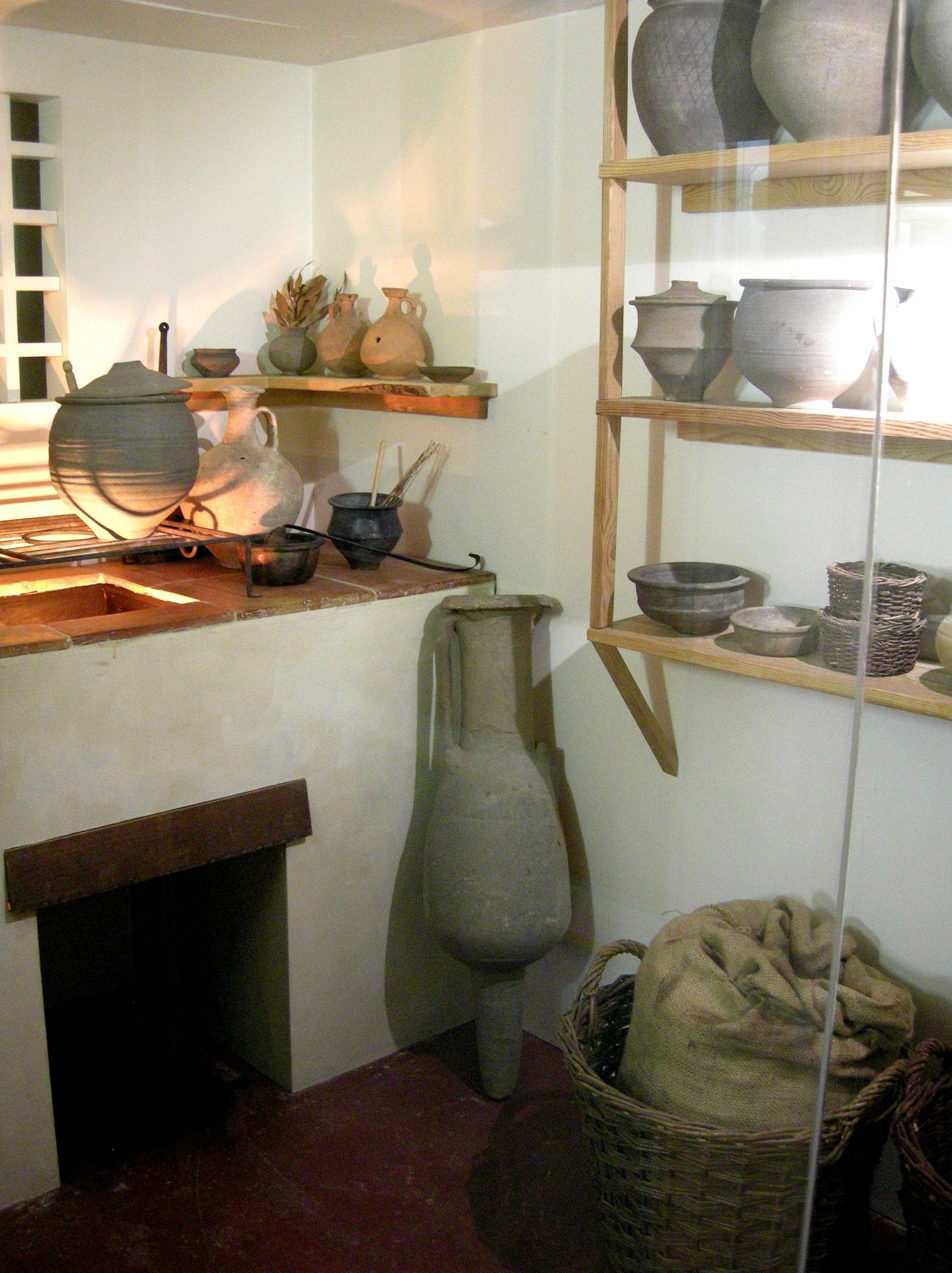
Reconstructed Roman kitchen (Roman Museum, Canterbury)

Lavatories were used in towns, but not at villas since trees provided privacy. Rubbish was discarded out the window or into pits. Walls (interior and exterior) and columns might be painted in bright colors, such as red, purple, brown or white. Roof tiles could be a bright sky-blue from the clay-baking process. Painted wall murals rarely survive, but were popular.

At least one mosaic appears in all villas, usually on the floor in public areas (and especially in dining rooms by the empire's end). Set in hard Roman cement and buried under collapsed debris, thousands have been found throughout northern Europe. Simple mosaics consisted of a geometric pattern, but an enormous range of cultural and artistic aspects of Roman life were also portrayed (including interpretations of classical literature and Roman mythology).

Furniture was sparse by modern standards: a cupboard, sideboard and an occasional table were set along the walls, and brought out when needed. Beds were simple frames. During the late empire, dining was on reclining couches set in threes. Most rooms were square, with chairs and a small table. Increased wealth was spent not on more furniture, but better-quality pieces.

The most distinct structure at the villa was the Roman bath, its architectural showpiece: warm, noisy, clean and lavishly decorated. There were two types: Spartan, with high-temperature sauna-style dry heat and a “Turkish” (moist heat) version with plunge baths. A well-equipped bath would provide both, with the bather entering an unheated room to undress and going into a warm room, a warmer room and a hot bath (perhaps including massage) followed by cleansing. Cleansing was done not with soap, but olive oil scraped off with a bronze tool known as a strigil. Cleansing was followed by a cold plunge bath. Lighting for the baths came through narrow lancet windows. Rarely, pale green glass (glazed or held by crossbars) has been found in windows. Personal lighting came from hand-carried oil lamps. Some lamps had multiple wicks, providing more light but consuming more olive oil. An oil lamp was capable of burning for 40 to 50 hours.

On the outside of the villa, hinged wooden shutters protected windows. Walls were rendered or exposed timber and frame. Roofs were made from thatch, tile, stone, terra cotta or a combination, with occasional stone finials. Flower gardens decorated the villas, resembling ordered patches of wild flowers. These gardens were considered necessary for festivals, family altars and banquets. Common flowers were roses, violets, lilies, narcissus, sunflowers, carnations, hyacinths, bluebells and snapdragons. Vegetable gardens were laid out in beds, yielding lettuce, cabbage, leeks, beans and radishes. Fruits consisted of apples, pears, cherries, figs, almonds and plums.

Most villas had an aisled barn (rarely two), storing equipment and produce rather than animals. Archeologists have found evidence in these barns of corn drying, metalwork and communal kitchens. The barns may have been partitioned, since workers often slept where they worked.

== Religion ==
Roman villas illustrate the Christianization of Europe, since the country villa served as "pieces of cities broken off" and Christianity originated as an urban religion. The Galois aristocrats benefited from conversion by closer ties to Rome (and the emperor's family) after Constantine's conversion. Roman culture was flexible, so a multicultural blend (or sympathetic intermingling) was usually the result with many villas religiously ambiguous. The local peasants (and their pagan traditions) were ignored; pre-Roman religious sites evolved into Roman cult sites and (later) Christian pilgrimage destinations. Because the church kept all records throughout the fall of Rome and the Middle Ages, historians have little information about local non-Christian beliefs.

Since historians only know in general terms about Celtic religion, archeology provides additional information. Peasants on the villa estates observed a complex polytheism. While Gallo-Roman religion considered Mercury (known as Lug by the Gauls) the chief god, there were many nature gods and goddesses for war, thunder, trees and youth. Earth goddesses were Divona (water), Onuava (earth) and Epona (horses and fertility).

Villa managers and owners were dependent on local labor. The aristocrats paid lip service to country life with its sturdy virtues, health and innocent pleasures; however, they also felt disdain (mingled with fear) for peasants. The latter have always faced forces beyond their control, seeking to improve and influence their situation with religious acts. Villa owners sometimes created religious sites on their estates as a destination for pilgrimages, but most were abandoned during the Christian era. Aerial photography has confirmed pagan temples in high-villa-density areas by their distinctive square shape (with over 40 in Picardy alone).

== Evolution and decline ==
As the central empire declined, villas became more self-sufficient and less part of a larger market economy. At the same time, a greater number of smaller villas appeared, exhibiting Roman culture and values. As Rome waned, the provinces waxed at first.

From 235 AD (the death of Emperor Severus Alexander) a series of short-lived, sometime incompetent emperors ruled Rome. They generally died violently, after serving for an average of 2.6 years. The high turn-over represents the attempt to find a leader who could deal with the challenges facing the empire. Generals Postumus and Tetricu in Gaul established a separate 'Gallic' Empire 260-274 in response to an invasion of tribes in 259 which reached as far south as Tarrgona in Spain since the legitimate emperor in Rome was too pressed to respond. Bubonic plague (or malaria) may have swept the provinces, and villa owners feared bandit armies. A manpower shortage meant that fewer people were paying taxes. Some continental villa investors may have moved their holdings to Roman Britain. The Empire actually did not have a budget in the modern sense until Diocletian, 284-305. The authorities resorted to forced requisition to meet needs. From 257 CE to 276 CE began the first series of barbarian invasions pillaging the countryside. These outsiders sensed the disorganization of the Imperial armies on the frontier, and took advantage of the power vacuum:

The whole region between the Alps and the Pyrenees, the ocean and the Rhine was devastated.
The Quadi, the Vandals, the Sarmati, the Alani, the Gepidae, the Herul, the Saxons, the Burgundians, the Alemanni and Pannonians.
O wretched Empire.

— Saint Jerome, 409 CE

Roman rulers debased the currency to pay the armies, creating enormous inflation. Arbitrary requisitions on rural population caused many to flee the anarchic conditions. Beginning in the early fourth century, more villas appeared to be uninhabited; coins and datable pottery become rare in the archaeological record. The market economy survived, unpredictably, in some parts of Gaul. During this time, archeologists have found more wooden, temporary construction on villa grounds; some villas added fortifications.

A recent, nuanced view is that although massacre sites at villas have been found, most barbarian newcomers arrived with sickle rather than sword; they wanted to be settlers. Backed by armed garrisons living nearby, the new occupiers moved in and dominated politically and culturally. By the early fifth century all villas seemed abandoned as residences; however, archeologists have found small homes built next to the large houses. Some villas seem to have served as cemeteries. Pollen analyses for this period found no drop in crops, indicating that the population largely remained in place and sustained itself. The whole region between the Alps and the Pyrenees, the ocean and the Rhine suffered considerable damage. It took some decades to recover, however Gaul even in the north recovered some of its prosperity especially in the southern half of the country where numerous massive villas are attested. The beginning of the end of Roman Gaul came as a result of the invasions of tribes in 407 who eventually went to Spain in 409. However, the failure to control or remove the Visigoths in the southwest, the Burgundians in Savoy and the Franks in Belgium resulted in the end of Roman control post 455 (the assassination of Valentinian III opened the flood gates).

In 472-475 CE, the Roman Empire lost control of its remaining provinces in southern Gaul to the Visigoths. In the north the last rulers claiming to be Roman were defeated by the Franks in 486. In 470 CE a mass migration to Brittany from Britain occurred. There was continuity from the Roman villa culture and economy.

== Modern era ==
The size and shape of Roman estates did not change from Roman to Frankish occupation; parish or commune boundaries remained from Roman and (probably pre-Roman) times. Some Christians willed their villas to the church in Spain, which may have also happened in France. Some of these became monasteries; churches often occupied villa sites in the countryside as well.

The suffix "-ville" is thought to derive from villa, and place names often derived from the villa name. From the eighth to the twelfth centuries, Norman agglomerations in France began to acquire names. The prefix ville indicates a rural name; the suffix usually occurred in urban names (meaning the domain of a family's name). Most of this naming was done between the 10th and 11th centuries.

A good way to see Roman Gaul is from the sky. Fields may be seen in a rectangular system, with walls and foundations evident. However, without an archeological dig it is often difficult to date artifacts.

== See also ==
- Jublains archeological site
