= Ohey =

Municipality in Namur Province, Wallonia, Belgium

Ohey Ohè (Walloon)
- Municipality
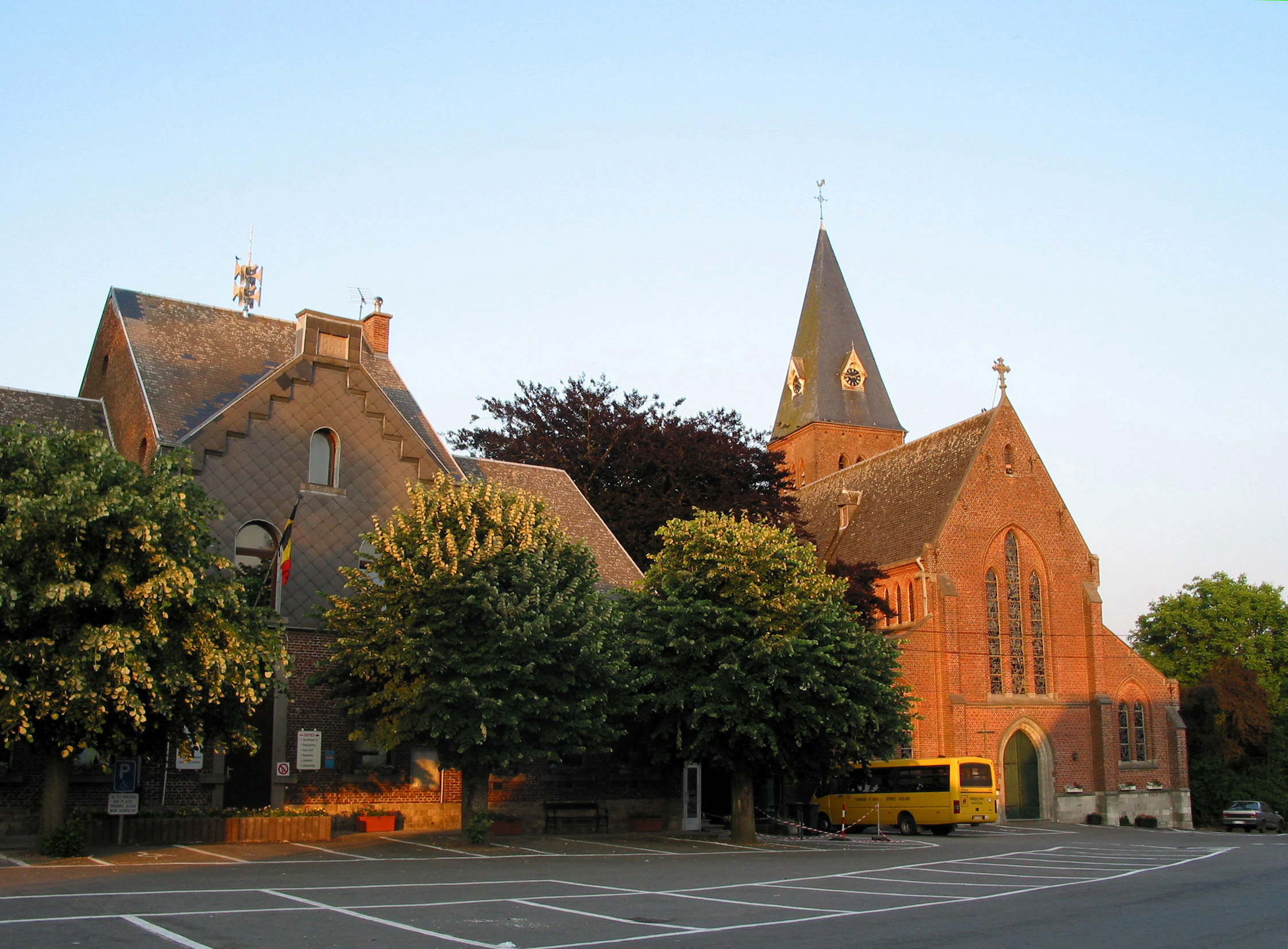
- The municipal centre and St Peter's Church

- Flag Coat of arms

- Location of Ohey in Namur Province
- Interactive map of Ohey
- Location in Belgium
- Coordinates: 50°26′N 05°08′E
- Country: Belgium
- Community: French Community
- Region: Wallonia
- Province: Namur
- Arrondissement: Namur

Government
  - Mayor: Christophe Gilon
  - Governing party: Plus d'Echo

Area
  - Total: 56.68 km^{2} (21.88 sq mi)

Population (2018-01-01)
  - Total: 5,090
  - Density: 89.8/km^{2} (233/sq mi)
- Postal codes: 5350-5354
- NIS code: 92097
- Area codes: 085
- Website: www.ohey.be

Ohey (French pronunciation: [ɔɛ]; Walloon: Ohè) is a municipality of Wallonia located in the province of Namur, Belgium.

On 1 January 2006 the municipality had 4,283 inhabitants. The total area is 56.62 km^{2} (21.86 sq mi), giving a population density of 76 inhabitants per square kilometre (200 inhabitants/mi^{2}).

The municipality is composed of the following districts: Évelette, Goesnes, Haillot, Jallet, Ohey, Perwez.

Also located in Ohey are the villages of Bois-Dame-Agis, Ève, Filée, La Bouchaille, Libois, Résimont, Saint-Mort and Tahier.

== See also ==
- List of protected heritage sites in Ohey
