= Somme-Leuze =

Municipality in Wallonia, Belgium

Somme-Leuze Some-Leuze (Walloon)
- Municipality
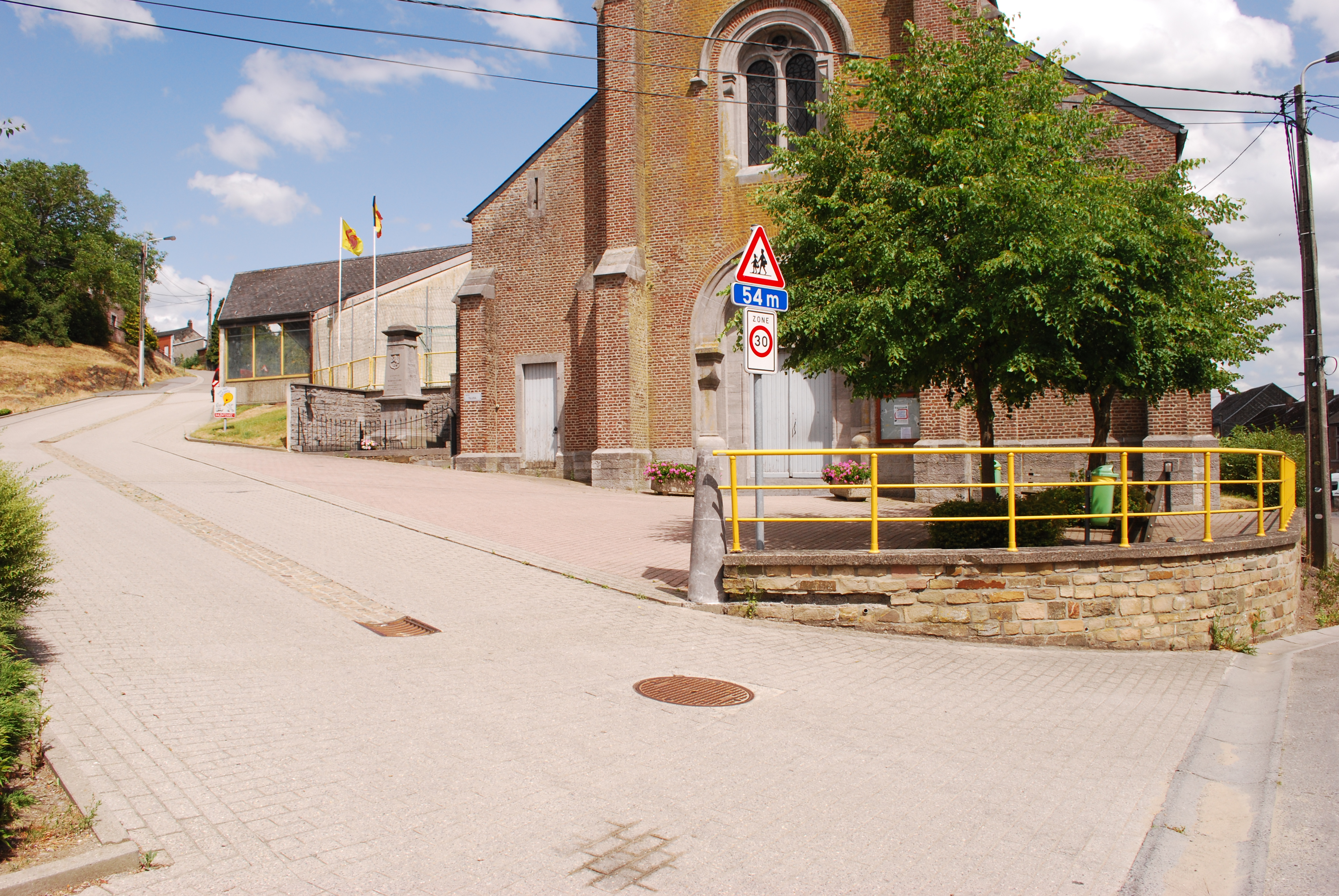

- Flag Coat of arms

- Location of Somme-Leuze in Namur province
- Interactive map of Somme-Leuze
- Location in Belgium
- Coordinates: 50°20′N 05°22′E
- Country: Belgium
- Community: French Community
- Region: Wallonia
- Province: Namur
- Arrondissement: Dinant

Government
  - Mayor: Valérie Lecomte
  - Governing party: Union Communale

Area
  - Total: 95.23 km^{2} (36.77 sq mi)

Population (2018-01-01)
  - Total: 5,587
  - Density: 58.67/km^{2} (152.0/sq mi)
- Postal codes: 5377
- NIS code: 91120
- Area codes: 086
- Website: www.somme-leuze.be

Somme-Leuze (French: [sɔm løz]; Walloon: Some-Leuze) is a municipality of Wallonia located in the province of Namur, Belgium.

On 1 January 2006 the municipality had 4,656 inhabitants. The total area is 95.09 km^{2}, giving a population density of 49 inhabitants per km^{2}.

The municipality consists of the following districts: Baillonville, Bonsin (including Chardeneux), Heure-en-Famenne, Hogne, Nettinne, Noiseux, Sinsin, Somme-Leuze, and Waillet.

== See also ==
- List of protected heritage sites in Somme-Leuze
