= List of national roads in Belgium =

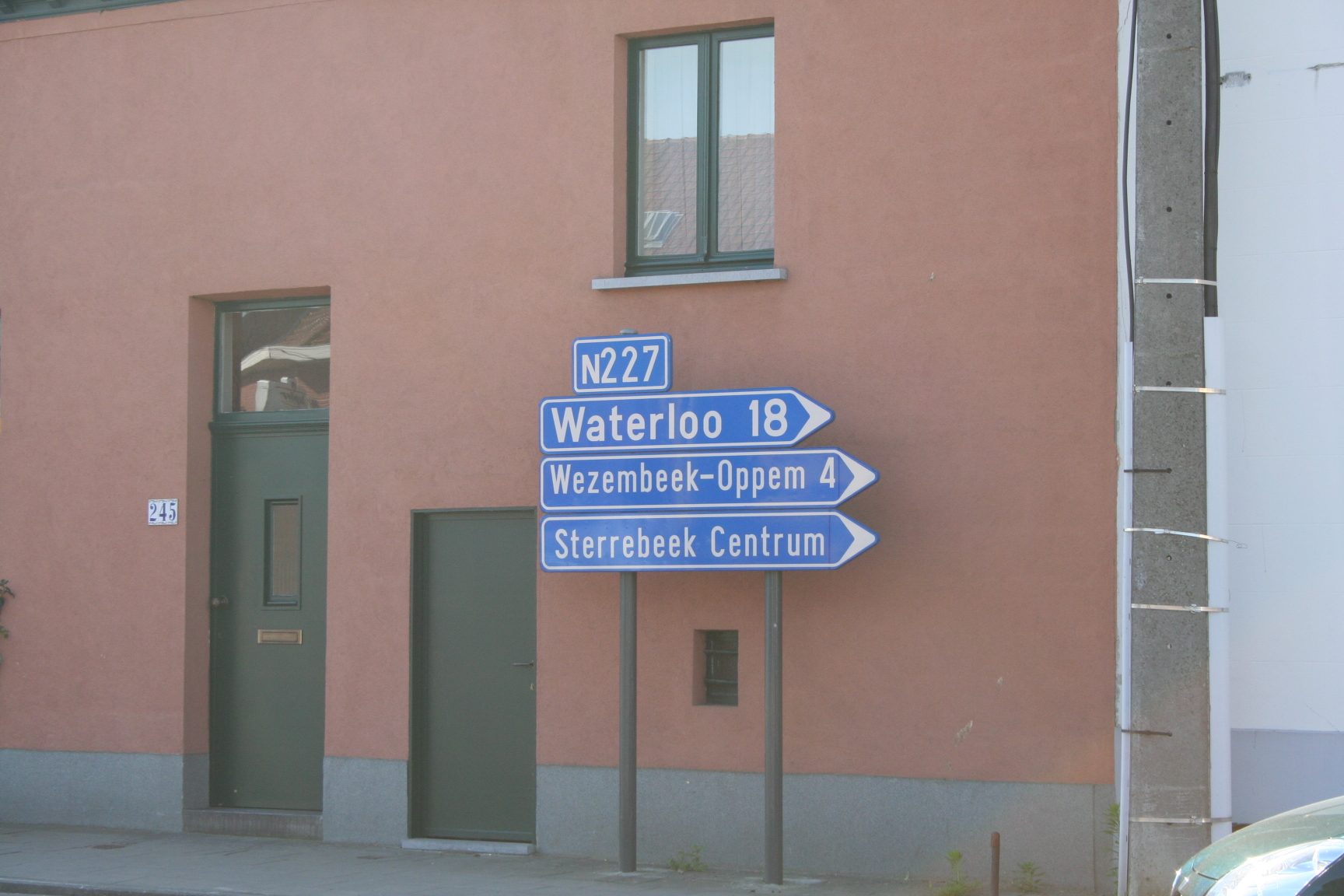
The N227 in Belgium

The national roads of Belgium are roads that cover the whole of the country; some of the roads are provincial and communal. The use of the national roads is free; they are open to all vehicles, but some are for cars only.

Since the second state reform in 1980, the networks of national roads have been managed by the federal regions, depending on the region in which they are located.

In general the road names are linked to the surrounding areas; most of these are linked to historical references. For example, the N3 around Liège is known as the "Road to Brussels" in the west of the city and the "Road to Fléron" in the east of the city. Another example is around Brussels, where the N2 is known as the "Road to Leuven" ("Chaussée de Louvain" in French, "Leuvensesteenweg" in Dutch).

The numbering of the roads is grouped into four networks of roads:

- The roads N1 to N9 are large connections, starting from Brussels to the borders of the country in each direction. These roads are numbered clockwise.
- In between are roads with numbers N10, N20, N30, etc., which are short connections between two N roads of the first network and located in different provinces.
- There are other important roads having numbers N11, N12, etc., up to N99.
- Lastly, there are local N roads with three digits.

Most of the roads of the third and fourth networks have a first digit that identifies the province: N1xx for Antwerp, N2xx for ex Brabant, N3xx for West Flanders, N4xx for East Flanders, N5xx for Hainaut, N6xx for Liège, N7xx for Limburg, N8xx for Luxemburg and N9xx for Namur. This first digit corresponds with the NIS code of the provinces.

Some short roads have the number of another N road suffixed with a letter of the alphabet. These are usually a short road connecting to an N road, a part of that N road, or a road that can be taken as an alternative to that N road.

== First network ==
The first network consists of national roads, each starting from the capital Brussels and forming a clockwise star.

Num.	Route
N1	Brussels – Antwerp – Breda (The Netherlands)
N2	Brussels – Hasselt – Maastricht (The Netherlands)
N3	Brussels – Leuven – Liège – Aachen (Germany)
N4	Brussels – Namur – Arlon – Luxembourg City (Luxembourg)
N5	Brussels – Charleroi – Reims (France)
N6	Brussels – Mons – Maubeuge (France)
N7	Halle – Tournai – Lille (France)
N8	Brussels – Kortrijk – Ypres – Koksijde
N9	Brussels – Ghent – Bruges – Ostend

== Second network ==
The second network groups the national roads that are linked to major cities and towns of Belgium, excluding Brussels.

Num.	Route
N10	Mortsel – Diest
N20	Hasselt – Liège
N30	Liège – Bastogne
N40	Arlon – Mons
N50	Mons – Bruges
N60	Ghent – Peruwelz – Valenciennes (France)
N70	Ghent – Antwerp
N80	Hasselt – Namur
N90	Mons – Charleroi – Namur – Liège

== Third network ==
The third network is composed of provincial national roads. The first digit corresponds to a province—from 1 to 9—based upon the old provinces and in alphabetical order in French, thus: 1 is Province of Antwerp; 2 is Province of Brabant; 3 is Province of West Flanders; 4 is Province of East Flanders; 5 is Province of Hainaut; 6 is Province of Liège; 7 is Province of Limburg; 8 is Province of Luxemburg; and 9 is Province of Namur.

=== Province of Antwerp ===
Num.	Route
N11	Merksem – Putte – (The Netherlands)
N12	Antwerp – Turnhout – Poppel – (The Netherlands)
N13	Lier – Geel
N14	Mechelen – Meerle – (The Netherlands)
N15	Mechelen – Westerlo
N16	Mechelen – Sint-Niklaas
N17	Puurs – Dendermonde
N18	Turnhout – Leopoldsburg
N19	Turnhout – Leuven

=== Province of Brabant ===
Num.	Route
N21	Brussels – Haacht – Aarschot
N22	Brussels – Zaventem
N23	Rue Belliard – Avenue de Roodebeek (including tunnels)
N24	Place Poelaert – Avenue Louise – Avenue Franklin Roosevelt
N25	Leuven – Wavre – Ottignies – Louvain-la-Neuve – Nivelles
N26	Leuven – Mechelen
N27	Waterloo – La Louvière – Binche
N28	Nivelles – Halle – Ninove
N29	Charleroi – Diest – Beringen

=== Province of West Flanders ===
Num.	Route
N31	Bruges – Zeebruges
N32	Bruges – Menen – Halluin (France)
N33	Ostend – Torhout
N34	Knokke – Ostend – Adinkerke
N35	De Panne – Gavere
N36	Zarren – Roeselare – Ronse
N37	Aalter – Ypres
N38	Ypres – Cassel (France)
N39	Nieuwpoort – Dunkirk (France)

=== Province of East Flanders ===
Num.	Route
N41	Aalst – Dendermonde – Sint-Niklaas
N42	Wetteren – Geraardsbergen – Lessines
N43	Ghent – Kortrijk – Mouscron
N44	Aalter – Maldegem
N45	Aalst – Ninove – Soignies
N46	Aalst – Oudenaarde
N47	Asse – Lokeren
N48	Brakel – Ronse – Tournai
N49	Antwerp – Zelzate – Maldegem – Knokke

=== Province of Hainaut ===
Num.	Route
N51	Mons – Quiévrain – Valenciennes, Nord, D630 (France)
N52	Gaurain-Ramecroix – Brunehaut
N53	Charleroi – Chimay
N54	Charleroi – Erquelinnes – Maubeuge, Nord, D649 (France)
N55	Enghien – La Louvière – Solre-sur-Sambre
N56	Nimy – Ath
N57	Ronse – Lessines – Soignies – Familleureux
N58^{†}	Dottignies – Dronkaard ... Menen (A19) – Armentières (France)
N59	Feluy – Gozée

^{†}Due to linguistic differences, the national road N58 took more than twenty years to build. It does not actually run from Dottignies to Armentières as anticipated because the road is split into two sections: the first stretches from Armentières in France up to Menen where it joins onto the A19 motorway; the other part starts in the village of Dronkaard to the southeast of Menen, and ends in the village of Dottignies.

=== Province of Liège ===
Num.	Route
N61	Liège – Verviers – Limbourg – Eupen
N62	Beaufays – Saint-Vith – Diekirch (Luxembourg)
N63	Liège – Marche-en-Famenne
N64	Huy – Tirlemont
N65	Huy – Waremme
N66	Huy – Trois-Ponts
N67	Welkenraedt – Eupen – Monschau (Germany)
N68	Aachen (Germany) – Eupen – Stavelot – Diekirch (Luxembourg)
N69	Tongeren – Waremme – Moxhe

=== Province of Limburg ===
Num.	Route
N71	Geel – Mol – Lommel – Hamont – Achel – Maarheeze (The Netherlands)
N72	Zonhoven – Beringen – Heppen
N73	Kessenich – Tessenderlo
N74	Hasselt – Eindhoven (The Netherlands)
N75	Hasselt – Genk – Dilsen
N76	Borgloon – Genk – Hamont
N77	Genk – Maastricht (The Netherlands)
N78	Vroenhoven – Maaseik – Venlo (The Netherlands)
N79	Sint-Truiden – Maastricht (The Netherlands)

=== Province of Luxemburg ===
Num.	Route
N81	Arlon – Athus
N82	Arlon – Virton
N83	Arlon – Bouillon
N84	Bastogne – Ettelbruck
N85	Carignan – Florenville – Bastogne
N86	Aywaille – Marche-en-Famenne – Ave-et-Auffe
N87	N4 – Virton – Montmédy
N88	Athus – Virton – Florenville
N89	Sedan (France) – Salmchâteau

=== Province of Namur ===
Num.	Route
N91	Namur – Hamme-Mille
N92	Namur – Dinant
N93	Namur – Nivelles
N94	Dinant – Halma
N95	Dinant – Bouillon
N96	Yvoir – Dinant – Givet (France)
N97	Philippeville – Clavier
N98	Sombreffe – Vodecée
N99	Doische – Couvin – Chimay – Hirson (France)

== Fourth network ==
The fourth network consists of national secondary roads. The first digit corresponds to the province, as for the third network.

Num.	Route
N203	Ring N203a – Sint-Rochus (Halle)
N237	Ottignies – Court-Saint-Étienne – Bousval – Genappe – Nivelles
N275	Watermael-Boitsfort – Villers-la-Ville
N285	Asse – Hove
N375	Ypres (N37b) – Dikkebus – Loker – Belle (Bailleul), Nord, D23 (France)
N397	Zedelgem (N309) – Bruges
N500	Tournai – Antoing – Vezon
N501	Vaulx – N7
N502	Tournai – Antoing – Bruyelle (Antoing)
N503	Antoing – Callenelle (Péruwelz)
N504	Péruwelz – Vezon
N505	Péruwelz – Stambruges (Access 27 A16E42)
N506	Quevaucamps – Blaton (Access 28 A16E42)
N507	Tournai – Brunehaut – Saint-Amand-les-Eaux, Nord, D169 (France)
N508	Tournai – Rumes – Orchies, Nord, D938 (France)
N509	Tournai – Templeuve – Roubaix, Nord, D206 (France)
N523	Brugelette – Silly
N524	Tertre – Soignies
N525	Chièvres – Hornu
N526	Leuze-en-Hainaut – Sirault
N527	Ath – Grandglise-Stambruges
N528	Ath – Frasnes-lez-Buissenal
N529	Tournai – Lessines
N532	Braine-le-Comte – Mignault
N533	Braine-le-Comte – Nivelles
N534	Marche-lez-Ecaussinnes – Ronquières
N550	Cuesmes – Boussu
N563	Chapelle-lez-Herlaimont – Gœgnies-Chaussée – Gognies-Chaussée, Nord, D31 – Bavay, Nord, D932 (France)
N567	Mellet – Fleurus
N574	Nalinnes-Bultia – Biesme
N582	Fontaine-l'Eveque – Gosselies
N586	Nivelles – Gosselies
N681	Malmedy – Robertville
N910	Mesnil-Saint-Blaise – Achêne
N911	Beauraing – Rochefort
N912	Éghezée – Fleurus
N913	Carlsbourg – Graide – Houdremont
N914	Sorendal – Vresse-sur-Semois – Graide
N915	Anthée – Mesnil-Saint-Blaise
N921	Ciney – Halbosart
N922	Châtelet – Sovimont
N922	Châtelet – Fosses-la-Ville – Floreffe
N923	Jemeppe-sur-Sambre – Ham-sur-Sambre
N924	Champion – Wasseiges
N929	Dion – Houyet – Grandhan
N930	Onoz – Vitrival
N932	Annevoie-Rouillon – Fraire
N935	Gedinne – Pussemange
N936	Hastière – Onhaye – Dinant – Achêne
N937	Yvoir – Ciney
N938	Achêne – Méan
N942	Saint-Germain (Eghezée) – Frisée
N947	Jambes – Godinne
N948	Dinant – Dorinne
N951	Wépion – Morville
N952	Hargnies – Haut-Fays
N958	Floreffe – Suarlée
N959	Beez – Namêche
N971	Anhée – Denée
N972	Eghezée – Perwez
N975	Châtelet – Corenne
N977	Biesme – Agimont
N978	Somzée – Cerfontaine
N981	Flohimont – Beauraing
N983	Ohey – Barvaux-sur-Ourthe
N988	Fleurus – Saint-Gérard
N992	Gelbressée – Marche-les-Dames
