= Antoing cement kiln =

Industrial facility in Hainaut, Belgium

Coordinates: 50.5754°N 3.4424°E

The Antoing cement kiln is in the Belgian province of Hainaut. The facility is next to the Scheldt River in the Tournai region. It was built in 1929 under CBR which was later taken over by Heidelberg Materials.

== History and ownership ==
In 1910 the anonymous association Cimenteries et Briqueteries Réunies Bonne-Espérance et Loën (abbreviated CBR) was formed by the merger of the two companies: La Bonne Esperance and Fabrique de Ciment Portland Artificiel de Loën. In 1929 CBR took over the Société Carrières et Fours à Chaux et à Ciment du Coucou in Antoing. Around 1975, crushing plants were installed on the Antoing site. In 1981, the Société Cimescaut (Société Générale des Ciments Portland de l'Escaut) becomes part of CBR together with its blue limestone quarry. During this year they switch from the wet process to the dry process in Antoing. In 1983, CBR starts building a new clinker factory in Antoing. In 1986, a cement kiln was installed at the Antoing plant. In 1993 CBR was taken over by HeidelbergCement.

=== Heidelberg Materials ===
Heidelberg Materials is a listed building materials company based in Heidelberg, Germany. The company has been operating since 1873 and originated from a brewing family. Heidelberg is the current world leader in producing construction aggregates (293.7 million tonnes/year), 2nd largest in cement production (126.5 million tonnes/year) and 3rd largest producer of ready-mixed concrete (45 million m^{3}/year).

The Heidelberg Group operates in more than 50 countries and has 57,000 employees worldwide working at 3,000 production sites. Since 1993, they have also been active in Belgium through the acquisition of the company CBR. Because CBR was already a large multinational company, Heidelberg was able to grow strongly internationally. It owns several sites in Belgium including Antoing and Lixhe.

== Kiln ==
=== Process ===
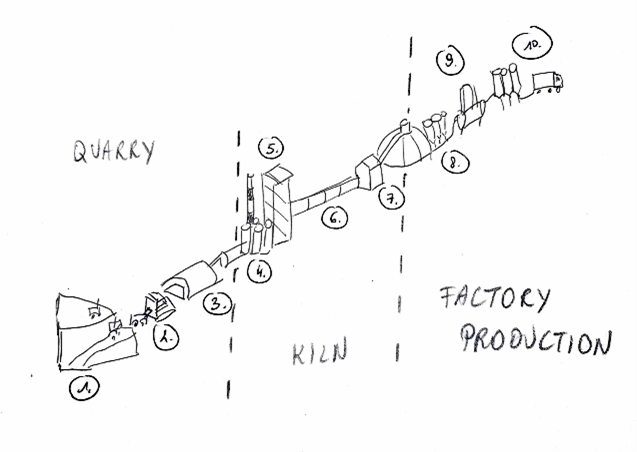
Production process of a cement plant from start to finish

At the Antoing site of Heidelberg Materials, there is 1 cement kiln that operates according to the dry process with a capacity of 3250 tons of clinker per day. This kiln consists of 3 zones:

1. the extraction, dosing and mixing of raw materials (step 1 to 3)
2. the kiln (step 4 to 7)
3. the crushing process of the resulting product. (step 8 to 10)

The mining of raw materials is done in the quarry next to the cement kiln site. After mining, the raw materials are broken down, mixed and crushed into "raw powder". The crushing of the raw material is done in 2 ball mills with a capacity of 130 tons/h. The crushing process also produces a lot of noise, which can go up to L_{p} = 140 dB which is louder than a jet engine. The powder produced consists of 3 essential cement components: limestone (CaCO_{3}), silica (SiO_{2}) and alumina (Al_{2}O_{3}). Before the powder goes to the kiln, the composition of the 3 components is carefully monitored to ensure the right ratio. The powder can also sometimes be mixed with iron oxide, blast furnace slag from the steel industry or with fly ash from coal combustion.

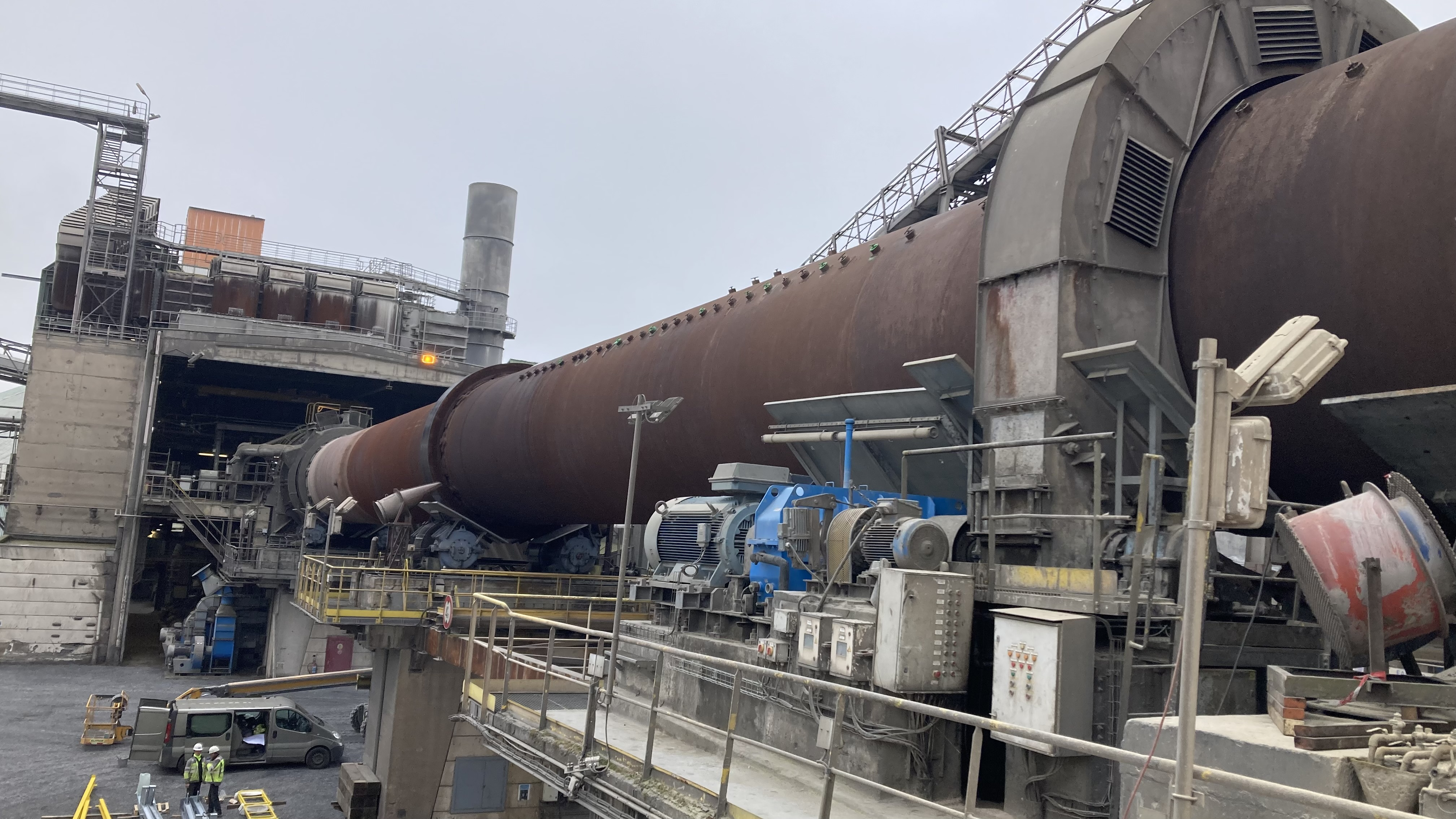
Antoing's cement kiln

After composing the raw powder, it is taken to the furnace. The furnace consists of 2 processes: the tower where the calcination process (step 5) takes place and the kiln with the sintering process(step 6). The powder is first brought into the top of the 88m high tower where it is heated up to 900 °C and where the calcination of limestone starts to produce lime (CaCO_{3} → CaO + CO_{2}). During this process, a lot of CO_{2} (68% of totale emission) is released. After the calcination process, the materials go to the sintering process in the kiln, which is located at the bottom of the tower. The kiln consists of a 67m long tube of 3.9m in diameter with metal on the outside and covered with a fireproof brick on the inside. It is supported by 3 points and is placed under a slight angle of 2.5%. The kiln slides back-and-forth and rotates at a speed of 4.2 rotations per minute. In the sintering process, the powder is further heated to 1450 °C to activate the silica (SiO_{2}) and allow it to combine with the lime and alumina (and iron oxide/blast furnace slag/flying gas) to form the clinker minerals. The result are clinker granules with a size of 3-25mm, which is first cooled heavily to 150 °C before going into storage (step 7).

After the kiln and the manufacturing of the clinker granules, they are stored in 1 large silo of 55000 tons. The granules are then transported by ship to other Heidelberg Materials sites in Ghent, Rotterdam and IJmuiden where they are crushed on these sites (step 8 to 10).

=== CO_{2} emissions ===
During the processes in the kiln, CO_{2} is emitted into the atmosphere. 68% of these total emissions are released by the chemical process of calcination of limestone into lime (CaCO_{3} → CaO + CO_{2}). The other 32% is released during the fossil fuel burning process to reach the temperature of 1800 °C. The kiln must remain constantly active to ensure that the kiln does not expand in different zones and to prevent kiln deformation. A backup burner is provided for this purpose as well as a backup for the backup. Shutting down the kiln is possible but will take 5 days, therefore this is only done once a year during the maintenance period.

With a production of 3250 tons of clinker per day or 1.15 million tons of clinker per year and an emission of 0.717 tons of CO_{2} per tonne clinker, we are looking at an annual emission of 842.55 kilotons of CO_{2} per year in Antoing. This means that 33 million trees needs to be planted or 65.9 thousand hectares of forest (comparable to 85% of the land surface of New York City) to absorb these emissions. To put this further into perspective, a comparison can be made between the CO_{2} emissions of Antoing and the total CO_{2} emissions in Belgium. Looking at Belgian industry with an emission of 16863 kton CO_{2} in 2022, Antoing's cement kiln has a 4.9% share there. To dig even deeper into the total CO_{2} emissions from cement production in Belgium with an emission of 2443 kton CO_{2} in 2022, Antoing has a contribution of 34.5% of the total CO_{2} emissions from Belgian cement production.

To reduce environmental impact, fossil fuel is often replaced by industrial wastes as an alternative fuel, however not all fuels are suitable such as sulfates, alkanes and sulfites. The less you use these chemicals as fuel, the less you emit of these pollutants. In Antoing, coal is used as the main component for fuel. The rest (65%) comes from alternative fuels such as fluff, animal meal and dried sludges which are fed to the main burner together with pure O_{2} injection. The preheater is fed with fluff, saw dust, 3D plastic, dried sludges and animal meal. While these alternative fuels reduce CO_{2} emissions by reducing the proportion of coal, a critical look should also be taken at the alternative fuels used. For example, dried sludge, burning dried sludge releases a lot of methane (CH_{4}) which is also a harmful greenhouse gas and should also be given attention.

Another technique Heidelberg Materials uses to reduce impact is to use cRCP, which is old concrete that has been broken down back to its three basic components: aggregates, sand and powder. The extracted powder can then be reactivated by reacting with CO_{2}. This can serve as a replacement powder for fly ash or blast furnace slag, but cannot completely replace cement. This technology ensures that the CO_{2} that was released to make the cement for the old concrete is not lost, thus recycling the CO_{2} that was once emitted, so to speak.

=== Future plans ===
To further reduce environmental impact in the future, Heidelberg Materials says they are working on the Anthemis project (Antoing Heidelberg Emissions Integrated Solutions), which is a CO_{2} capturing project and should be in place by 2029. For Antoing, they want to aim for a 97% reduction of emissions, which amounts to 800000 ton CO_{2} per year. This will require an investment of 450 million euros. The process would work according to 3 main steps: first, the emissions are cooled down to 50 °C, then CO_{2} is unbound from the total emissions and finally this unbound CO_{2} is compressed and prepared for transport. This captured CO_{2} would then be transported to harbors where it will be taken by ship to Øygarden Municipality. Once it arrives, the CO_{2} would be further compressed and pumped into pipelines that take it 110 km offshore where it can be stored under the seabed under a depth of 2.6 km. Concrete made with this CO_{2} captured cement will then be given an evoZero logo.

== Adjoning quarry ==
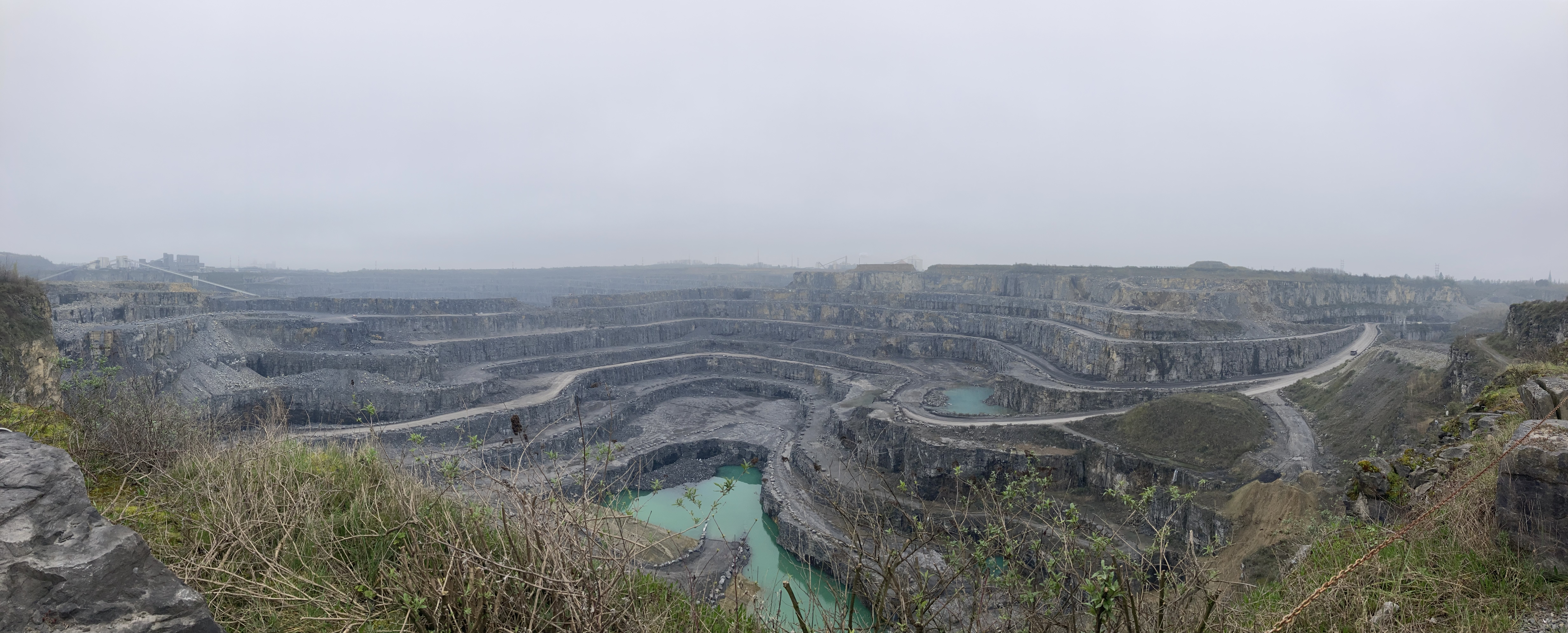
Carrière Cimescaut at Antoing

The Carrière Cimescaut limestone quarry is one of the three quarries present in Antoing and is an opencast mine where mainly blue limestone is extracted. Carrière Cimescaut has been owned by CBR since 1982 and is operated by Sagrex. Together with adjacent quarries: Carrière Lemay (Sagrex) and Carrière du Milieu (Holcim), the quarry covers an area of 240 hectares, comparable to 240 football fields. Carrière Lemay will in the future be united with Carrière Cimescaut to form one large limestone quarry. Demolition of the separation wall between these 2 quarries has already begun.

Annually, Carrière Cimescaut mines 2.3 million tons of limestone for making cement and aggregates (asphalt, concrete applications, etc.). From this, about 900,000 tons of clinker is produced and destined for the cement plants in Ghent, Rotterdam and IJmuiden. The remaining limestone is used as granulates. The entire production is transported via the Scheldt River.

The quarry consists of 8 banks with a height of 10-20m. The limestone is mined by controlled explosions. Each blast uses about 5 tons of dynamite and yields about 20,000 tons of limestone. After mining, the limestone is ground with a cone crusher and divided into poor and rich limestone. A conveyor belt transports the limestone to the cement plant's storage silos.

The rock in the Antoing region dates from the Triassic and Cretaceous geological eras and was formed between about 245 – 145 million years ago. It consists mainly of dark gray to black, clayey limestones divided into horizontal banks of 20 to 80 cm. This is called the formation of Antoing. 4 layers are distinguishable in this formation, from top to bottom:

1. Member of Warchin
2. Member of Gaurain-Ramecroix
3. Calonne superior
4. Calonne inferieure
