= List of roads in West Flanders =

This is a list of the various roads and highways located in the West Flanders province of Belgium. West Flanders is known for its extensive network of regional, national, and European roads connecting key towns, cities, and coastal areas.

== Overview ==
West Flanders features a combination of major highways, regional roads, and local streets that facilitate transportation and commerce in the region. The road network supports connectivity within the province and links it to the rest of Belgium and neighboring countries.

== Major highways and motorways ==
- E40 Motorway – A major east-west European route passing through Bruges.
- E403 Motorway – Connecting Bruges to Kortrijk and beyond.
- E17 Motorway – Linking Ghent and Kortrijk, part of the corridor to France.

== National roads (N roads) ==
- N31 Road – From Bruges to Ostend.
- N32 Road – Connecting Bruges to Torhout.
- N33 Road – Running between Bruges and Veurne.
- N35 Road – Linking Diksmuide and Ypres.
- N36 Road – Connecting Roeselare to Menen.
- N37 Road – Serving the area between Ypres and Menen.
- N313 Road – A regional road between Ieper (Ypres) and Poperinge.
- N368 Road – Connecting Houthulst and Diksmuide.
- N375 Road – Running near Roeselare.
- N398 Road – Connecting Kortemark and nearby towns.

== Regional roads ==
- N50 Road – Linking Bruges and nearby villages.
- N367 Road – Serving rural communities in the area.
- N382 Road – Running in the coastal region.
- N395 Road – Connecting smaller municipalities in West Flanders.
- N399 Road – Serving local traffic between towns.
- N303 Road – Road connecting regional centers.

== Important local roads ==
- N9 Road – Running from Bruges towards Kortrijk.
- N8 Road – Connecting Bruges to Ghent, partly overlapping West Flanders.
- N36 Road – Serving the Kortrijk area.
- N50 Road – Local road serving areas around Bruges.
- N8a Road – A regional spur connecting localities.

== Coastal roads ==
- N34 Road – The scenic coastal road running along the Belgian North Sea coast through West Flanders.
- N49 Road – Connecting Knokke-Heist to Bruges.

== See also ==
- Transport in Belgium
- List of roads in Belgium
- West Flanders

== Sources ==
- Regional road maps of West Flanders from the Belgian Federal Public Service Mobility and Transport
- Roads and highways overview in Belgium
- Official West Flanders provincial website – Transport and infrastructure section
