= N32 =

N32 may refer to:

== Roads ==
- N32 road (Belgium), a National Road in Belgium
- N32 road (Ireland)
- Nebraska Highway 32, in the United States

== Other uses ==
- N32 (Long Island bus)
- Northrop N-32, an American transport aircraft
- Thule Site N-32, a former Army Air Defense Command Post
