= N31 =

N31 may refer to

- N31 (Long Island bus)
- Kutztown Airport, in Berks County, Pennsylvania, United States
- London Buses route N31

== Roads ==
- N31 road (Belgium), a National Road in Belgium
- Route nationale 31, in France
- N31 road (Ireland)
- Nebraska Highway 31, in the United States
