= Joseph Defaux =

Belgian politician

Joseph Defaux (Gaurain-Ramecroix, 20 April 1860 – 28 June 1931) was a Belgian politician, a member of the Chamber of Representatives and mayor. He entered parliament in 1918.

== Biography ==
Defaux was born in Gaurain-Ramecroix, Tournai, on April 20, 1860. He was first a stonemason and soon became involved in trade union activity, trying to organize the working class. For this reason, he had a hard time dealing with the local employers and had to look for another job, which he found during the construction of the Edingen-Ronse-Vloesberg railway. He nevertheless became the first permanent secretary of the stonemasons' union in Tournai and remained so until 1918.

In his native village he became a municipal councilor (1904), alderman (1908) and mayor (1912–1920). He was also a provincial councilor for Hainaut (1912–1918).

In 1918 he succeeded Émile Royer, who died during the World War I, as a socialist representative for the Tournai – Aat district. He then exercised this mandate until his death. He remained unmarried.

In Gaurain-Ramecroix a monument was erected in his memory and there is a Résidence Joseph Defaux.

== Bibliography ==
- Paul Van Molle, Het Belgisch Parlement, 1894–1972, Antwerpen, 1972
