= Tournai-Ath (Chamber of Representatives constituency) =

Former Belgian national legislative constituency

Tournai-Ath was a constituency used to elect members of the Belgian Chamber of Representatives between 1900 and 1965.

== Representatives ==
| Election | Representative (Party) | Representative (Party) | Representative (Party) | Representative (Party) | Representative (Party) | Representative (Party) |
|---|---|---|---|---|---|---|
| 1900 | Henri Crombez (Liberal) | Henri Duquesne Watelet de la Vinelle (Catholic) | Joseph Hoÿois (Catholic) | Léon Cambier (Catholic) | Louis Pouille (PS) | Oswald Ouverleaux (Liberal) |
| 1904 | Albert Asou (Liberal) | Henri Duquesne Watelet de la Vinelle (Catholic) | Joseph Hoÿois (Catholic) | Emile Gracia (Catholic) | Louis Roger (Liberal) | Oswald Ouverleaux (Liberal) |
| 1908 | Albert Asou (Liberal) | Henri Duquesne Watelet de la Vinelle (Catholic) | Joseph Hoÿois (Catholic) | Emile Boval (Catholic) | Émile Royer (PS) | Oswald Ouverleaux (Liberal) |
| 1912 | Paul Jouret (Liberal) | Henri Duquesne Watelet de la Vinelle (Catholic) | Adhémar Foucart (Catholic) | Maurice Houtart (Catholic) | Joseph Defaux (PS) | Paul-Emile Janson (Liberal) |
| 1919 | Paul Jouret (Liberal) | Charles De Bruycker (Catholic) | Emile Carlier (PS) | Maurice Houtart (Catholic) | Joseph Defaux (PS) | Paul-Emile Janson (Liberal) |
| 1921 | Paul Jouret (Liberal) | Charles De Bruycker (Catholic) | Emile Carlier (PS) | Maurice Houtart (Catholic) | Joseph Defaux (PS) | Paul-Emile Janson (Liberal) |
| 1925 | Florentin Huart (PS) | Charles De Bruycker (Catholic) | Emile Carlier (PS) | Henri Carton de Tournai (Catholic) | Joseph Defaux (PS) | Paul-Emile Janson (Liberal) |
| 1929 | Paul Jouret (Liberal) | Charles De Bruycker (Catholic) | Emile Carlier (PS) | Henri Carton de Tournai (Catholic) | Ursmar Depotte (PS) | Paul-Emile Janson (Liberal) |
| 1932 | Joseph Nèves (PS) | Jacques Haustrate (Catholic) | Jules Hossey (PS) | Henri Carton de Tournai (Catholic) | Ursmar Depotte (PS) | René Lefebvre (Liberal) |
| 1936 | Gustave Wyns (REX) | Jacques Haustrate (Catholic) | Jules Hossey (PS) | Vincent Cossée de Maulde (Catholic) | Ursmar Depotte (PS) | René Lefebvre (Liberal) |
| 1939 | Camille Artisien (PS) | Jacques Haustrate (Catholic) | Jules Hossey (PS) | Vincent Cossée de Maulde (Catholic) | Ursmar Depotte (PS) | René Lefebvre (Liberal) |
| 1946 | Alphonse Bonenfant (PCB) | Horace Leleux (Liberal) | Jules Hossey (PS) | Maurice Couplet (CVP) | Paul Meunier (CVP) | René Lefebvre (Liberal) |
| 1949 | Alphonse Bonenfant (PCB) | Camille Vangraefschepe (BSP) | Jules Hossey (PS) | Maurice Couplet (CVP) | Pierre Wigny (CVP) | René Lefebvre (Liberal) |
| 1950 | Alphonse Bonenfant (PCB) | Camille Vangraefschepe (BSP) | Jules Hossey (PS) | Maurice Couplet (CVP) | Pierre Wigny (CVP) | René Lefebvre (Liberal) |
| 1954 | Henri Castel (BSP) | Camille Vangraefschepe (BSP) | Jules Hossey (PS) | Marcel Décarpentrie (CVP) | Pierre Wigny (CVP) | René Lefebvre (Liberal) |
| 1958 | Henri Castel (BSP) | Camille Vangraefschepe (BSP) | Jules Hossey (PS) | Marcel Décarpentrie (CVP) | Pierre Wigny (CVP) | René Lefebvre (Liberal) |
| 1961 | Henri Castel (BSP) | Jean Picron (Liberal) | Jules Hossey (PS) | Marcel Décarpentrie (CVP) | Pierre Wigny (CVP) | René Lefebvre (Liberal) |
