= List of protected heritage sites in Erquelinnes =

This table shows an overview of the protected heritage sites in the Walloon town Erquelinnes. This list is part of Belgium's national heritage.

Object	Year/architect	Town/section	Address	Coordinates	Number^{?}	Image
The towers, the main house and the stables of the castle farm Montignies-Saint-Christophe ^{(nl)} ^{(fr)}		Erquelinnes		50.283634°N 4.186177°E	56022-CLT-0001-01 Info	De torens, het hoofdgebouw en de stallen van het kasteelboerderij van Montignies-Saint-Christophe
The bridge called "Pont Romain" in Montignies-Saint-Christophe ^{(nl)} ^{(fr)}		Erquelinnes		50.282695°N 4.182742°E	56022-CLT-0002-01 Info	De brug genaamd "Pont Romain" te Montignies-Saint-Christophe
The Roman bridge and the surrounding land in Montignies-Saint-Christophe ^{(nl)} ^{(fr)}		Erquelinnes		50.282441°N 4.181153°E	56022-CLT-0003-01 Info	De Romeinse brug en het omliggende land in Montignies-Saint-Christophe
The church of Saint-Medard ^{(nl)} ^{(fr)}		Erquelinnes		50.309423°N 4.151514°E	56022-CLT-0004-01 Info	De kerk van Saint-Médard
The castle of Solre-sur-Sambre ^{(nl)} ^{(fr)}		Erquelinnes		50.309753°N 4.155708°E	56022-CLT-0005-01 Info	Het kasteel van Solre-sur-Sambre
The tower of the farm "Ferme du Clocher" in Solre-sur-Sambre ^{(nl)} ^{(fr)}		Erquelinnes		50.305739°N 4.146986°E	56022-CLT-0006-01 Info	De toren van het boerderij "Ferme du Clocher" te Solre-sur-Sambre
The chapel of Saint-Antoine-sur-Sambre in Solre ^{(nl)} ^{(fr)}		Erquelinnes		50.307691°N 4.154026°E	56022-CLT-0007-01 Info	
The facades and roofs of buildings of the farm "La Tour" on the rue Notre-Dame 18 ^{(nl)} ^{(fr)}		Erquelinnes	rue Notre-Dame, 18	50.310446°N 4.124711°E	56022-CLT-0008-01 Info	

== See also ==
- List of protected heritage sites in Hainaut (province)
- Erquelinnes
