= List of protected heritage sites in Antoing =

This table shows an overview of the protected heritage sites in the Walloon town Antoing. This list is part of Belgium's national heritage.

Object	Year/architect	Town/section	Address	Coordinates	Number^{?}	Image
House ^{(nl)} ^{(fr)}		Antoing		50.565839°N 3.447022°E	57003-CLT-0001-01 Info	Kasteel van Antoing met toevoegingen uit de 19e eeuw, de behuizing met torens uit de twaalfde eeuw en de hoofdingang genaamd Bolewerk, Place Bara en het ensemble gevormd door het kasteel, het omliggende park en de muren met inbegrip van gemeenschappelijk, parken en het bos aansluitend op het park naar de site van Crèvecoeur
Tumulus of Billemont ^{(nl)} ^{(fr)}		Antoing		50.571090°N 3.461782°E	57003-CLT-0002-01 Info	Tumulus van Trou de Billemont, Romeinse tombe met de naam "Billemont"
"Guéronde" Roman tomb ^{(nl)} ^{(fr)}		Antoing		50.572906°N 3.455579°E	57003-CLT-0003-01 Info	
part of Antoing park near the Crèvecoeur quarry ^{(nl)} ^{(fr)}		Antoing		50.556612°N 3.437369°E	57003-CLT-0005-01 Info	
City Hall ^{(nl)} ^{(fr)}		Antoing		50.565672°N 3.448868°E	57003-CLT-0008-01 Info	Stadhuis: hoofdgebouw met voorgevel, twee puntgevels, twee dakhellingen
Castle Lannoy ^{(nl)} ^{(fr)}		Antoing		50.551709°N 3.422369°E	57003-CLT-0009-01 Info	Kasteel van Lannoy of onjuist ook "Château de Bruyelle" genoemd

== See also ==
- List of protected heritage sites in Hainaut (province)
- Antoing
