= Gennaro Rubino =

Italian anarchist (1859–1918)

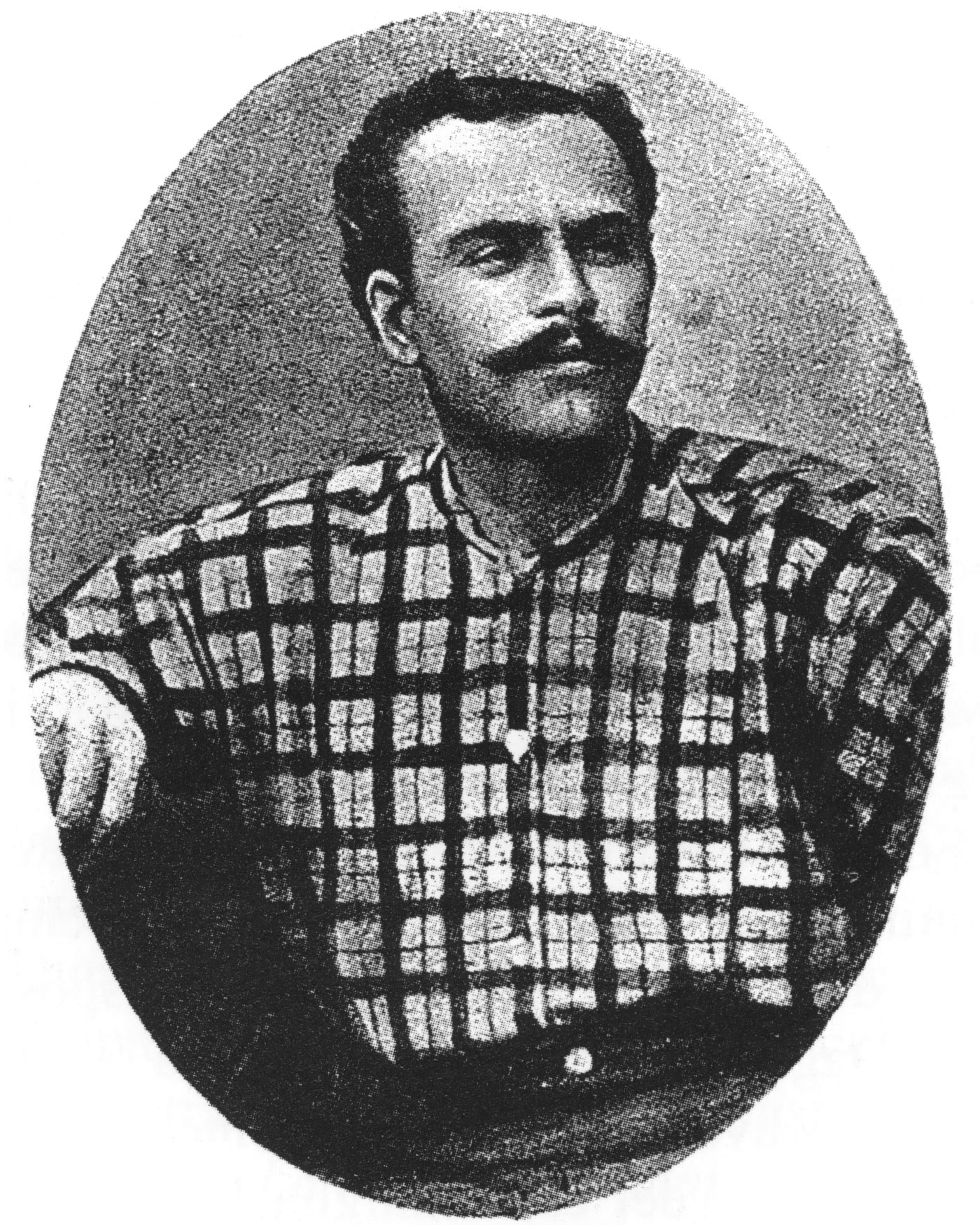
- Gennaro Rubino in 1894
- Born: Gennaro Rubino; 23 November 1859; Italy
- Died: 14 March 1918 (aged 58); Leuven, Belgium

Gennaro Rubino (November 23, 1859 – March 14, 1918; also spelled Rubini) was an Italian anarchist who unsuccessfully tried to assassinate King Leopold II of Belgium.

== Early life ==
Rubino was born in Bitonto, during the period of Italian unification. While serving in the Italian army as a young man, Rubino was condemned to five years' detention for writing a subversive newspaper article. In 1898, he was arrested again during bread riots in Milan. Rather than serving a lengthy prison sentence, Rubino fled the country. He first took up residence in Glasgow, Scotland and then moved to London. He was unable to find work, however, until offered assistance by the Italian Embassy. He was then employed by the Italian Secret Service to spy on anarchist organizations in London. He was dismissed from the job, however, once embassy officials discovered that he sympathized with the anarchists.

In May 1902, Rubino's employment with the Italian Secret Service was uncovered, and he was denounced by the international anarchist press as a spy. Evidently, Rubino then resolved to commit an assassination in order to prove his allegiance to the anarchist cause. As he wrote in a letter to his former comrades, "perhaps tomorrow or after, I will be able to prove my rebellion in a manner more consistent with my and your aspirations." According to later police interrogations, he considered killing King Edward VII, but decided against it due to the strong feeling of the English people in favour of the monarchy. Instead he chose King Leopold II of Belgium.

== Assassination attempt ==
In late October, 1902, Rubino relocated to Brussels. On the morning of November 15, 1902, King Leopold was returning from a ceremony in memory of his recently deceased wife, Marie Henriette.

The royal cortege left the cathedral. In the first carriage Prince Albert was seated with the king, and in the second carriage princess Elisabeth was seated.

Rubino took a revolver and waited for the King's procession among a crowd on the Rue Royale in front of the Bank of Brussels. After Leopold's carriage passed, Rubino drew his gun and fired three shots at the third carriage. In this carriage Count Charles John d'Oultremont, the Grand Marshal of the Royal court was seated, and he received broken glass in his face. The carriages did not stop and continued to the palace. When he arrived in the royal palace, the Grand Marshal was questioned by officials. His uniform was covered in broken glass. The king and members of the royal family were told that they had escaped an assassination attempt. The king asked if anybody had been hurt and then continued his day.

All three shots missed, although one smashed the window of a carriage of Count Charles d'Oultremont, who was almost killed. The king was saved by M. J. Bernard from Bar-le-duc who successfully disarmed Rubino. Paul van den Bosch, from Liege, caught Rubino by his throat and handed him to the police. The police put Rubino in a cab, which was immediately surrounded by an angry mob. The police had great difficulty in forcing their way through the crowd, which shouted alternately, "Kill him!" and "Long live the King!"

At the police station, Rubino was searched and found to be carrying a package of ball cartridges and picture postcards bearing portraits of King Leopold, Prince Albert, and Princess Elisabeth. Rubino said he procured the cards so he would be able to recognize the members of the royal family. He also said he did not regret his act and would have fired "at the King of Italy as readily as at the King of Belgium, because monarchs are tyrants who cause the misery of their peoples." He also asserted that he had no accomplices, although several people who were near Rubino when he fired the revolver asserted that he was accompanied by another man who escaped among the crowd.

Following the attempted assassination, anarchists further condemned Rubino as an agent provocateur, with some even speculating that the entire event was staged in order to justify subsequent police crackdowns against European anarchists. This speculation was fueled by early reports that the unfired cartridges left in Rubino's revolver were blanks. This was contradicted by later reports that Rubino's revolver was never found by the police.

== Trial and imprisonment ==
After the attempt he was sent to the prison of Saint Gilles, where he received three glasses of beer for dinner and some bread. He was questioned by the Examining magistrate M. J. Count d'Oultremont. Rubino chose Émile Royer, a socialist who had previously defended the anarchist Jules Moineau, as his lawyer.

There was an issue: because the grand Marshall of the royal Court count Charles d'Oultremont was related to Examining magistrate M. J. d'Oultremont, he had to be replaced by Mr. van Nerom to respect a neutral examination.

Rubino stood trial in Brussels in February 1903. At the trial Rubino was unrepentant and even boastful, declaring that he had hoped to be able to kill the King, Prince Albert, and a few of the clergy. During the trial Rubino often expounded anarchist doctrines which, he said, recognized neither laws nor judges. The jury found Rubino guilty and the court then sentenced him to life imprisonment.

== Death ==
Rubino died on March 14, 1918, in Leuven Centraal, the main prison of Leuven, Belgium.

== Sources ==
- Milillo, Stefano (2005). "Gennaro Rubino e l'attentato a Leopoldo II re del Belgio". Studi Bitontini (in Italian) (80). Edipuglia: 85–97. ISSN 0392-1727.
