= N41 road (Belgium) =

Regional road in Belgium

National Route 41
- Dutch: Nationale Weg 41; French: Route nationale 41

Route information
- Length: 20 km (12 mi)

Major junctions
- North end: Dendermonde
- 5,7,8
- South end: Sint Niklaas

Location
- Country: Belgium
- Provinces: West Flanders, East Flanders

Highway system
- Highways of Belgium; Motorways; National Roads

The N41 is a regional road in Belgium that connects the cities of Dendermonde and Sint Niklaas in Flanders. It serves as an important route for both commuters and freight traffic, passing through towns such as Hamme and Grembergen. It stretches to the E17 near Sint Niklaas and the N47 road near Dendermonde.

== Route ==
The N41 begins north in Sint Niklaas, travelling south past the E17 route, which connects to the cities of Ghent and Antwerp. The N41 road continues south for approximately 20 km until it reaches the N47 road near Dendermonde. The route consists of 6 bridges. In he northern section, the road has four lanes, two going in each direction, but in the south near Dendermonde, there is only one lane in each direction. This is due to the northern section of the road being closer to the E17 road, as many commuters from nearby towns use the N41 to commute to Antwerp or Ghent.

== History ==
The exact date of the construction of the N41 is not widely known.

During the Second World War, Nazi Germany invaded France through modern day Belgium and the Netherlands. The N41 road was a vital road for transporting soldiers and weapons, as the Nazis had a major base located near Hemme, located near to the N41 road. In 1940, 2500 troops were temporarily stationed there, so the N41 road acted as a vital connection point for army vehicles.

In 1985, during the country-wide re-classification of the road system, the road was called National Route 41, or in Dutch, Nationale Weg 41.

On 21 March 2025, a major car accident took place in Eleversele, near Hamme. 4 died in the incident, including 2 children.
