= Henri Carton de Tournai =

Belgian lawyer and politician

Henri Joseph Georges Carton de Tournai (1878–1969) was a Belgian lawyer and Catholic Party politician who was a member of the Belgian Senate and Chamber of Representatives, and a government minister.

== Life ==
Carton de Tournai was born in Tournai, Belgium, on 19 February 1878. He studied at the Catholic University of Leuven and became a lawyer in his hometown. He was elected to the Senate for the Tournai-Ath constituency in 1919, serving until 1925, and was then elected to the Chamber of Representatives from the same constituency, serving until 1936, when he was again elected to the Senate.

He was appointed Minister of the Colonies on 11 March 1924, late in the government of Georges Theunis, and retained the portfolio under the short-lived premierships of Aloys Van de Vyvere and Prosper Poullet. He resigned when Poullet's government fell on 20 May 1926. He went on to serve as Minister of the Interior from February to October 1932, in the government of Jules Renkin. During the Second World War, he worked discreetly to provide relief to those suffering under the German occupation. His final term in parliament ended in February 1946, as he did not stand for re-election in the 1946 Belgian general election. In 1956, he was awarded the title of baron. He died in Brussels on 18 January 1969.
