= Calonne, Wallonia =

Calonne
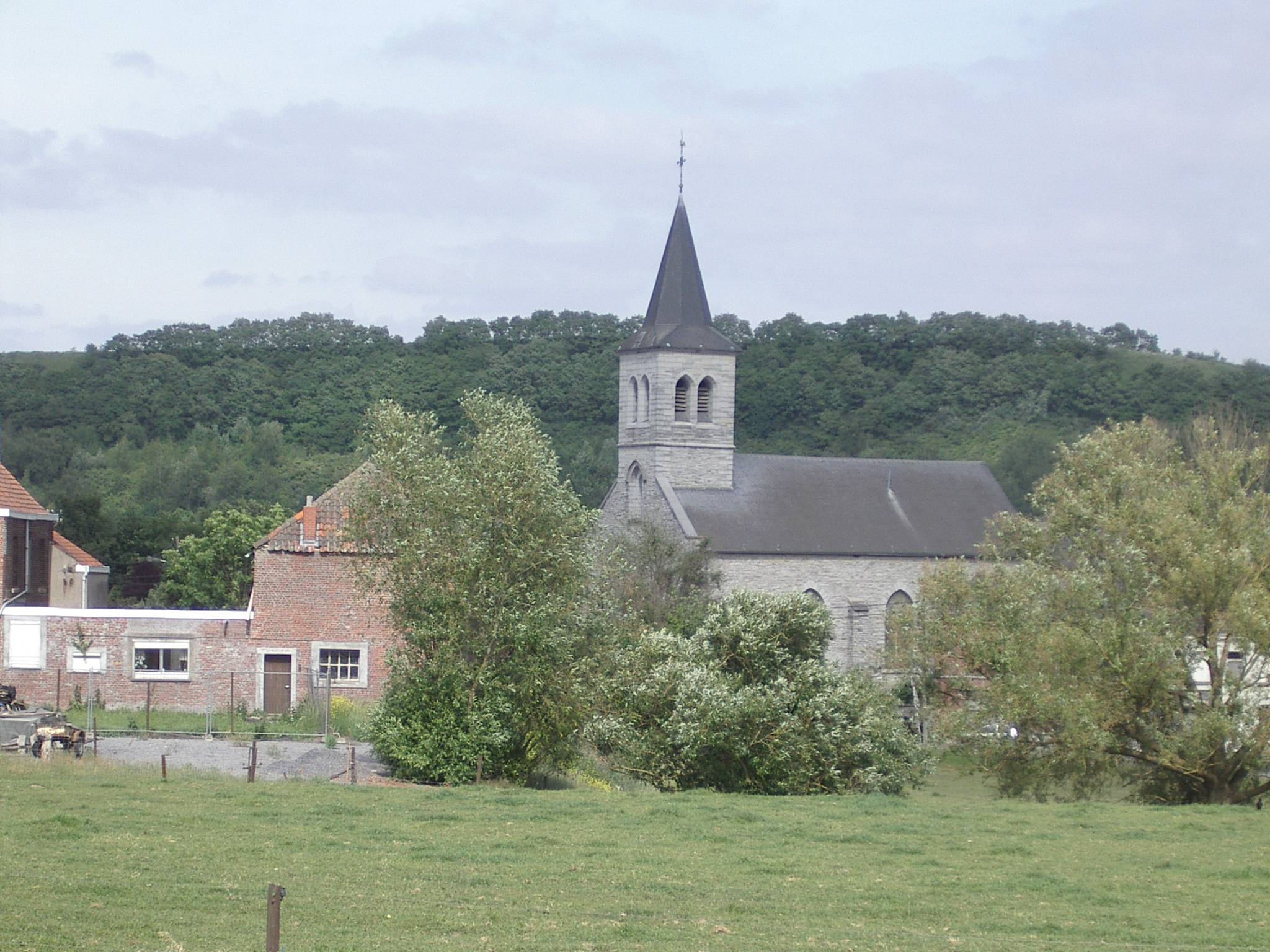
- Calonne

- Location in Belgium
- Coordinates: 50°34′37″N 03°26′13″E
- Country: Belgium
- Region: Wallonia
- Province: Hainaut
- Municipality: Antoing

Calonne is a village of Wallonia and a district of the municipality of Antoing, located in the province of Hainaut, Belgium.

The village is mentioned in written sources in the early 12th century, and became a parish of its own towards the end of the century. The village was directly subordinate to the cathedral chapter of Tournai Cathedral. Stone has been quarried in the village since at least 1349. The current village church dates from 1843 but replaced a far older structure on the same site when it was built.
