= Cyriaque Gillain =

Belgian Army general and politician

Cyriaque Cyprien Victor Gillain
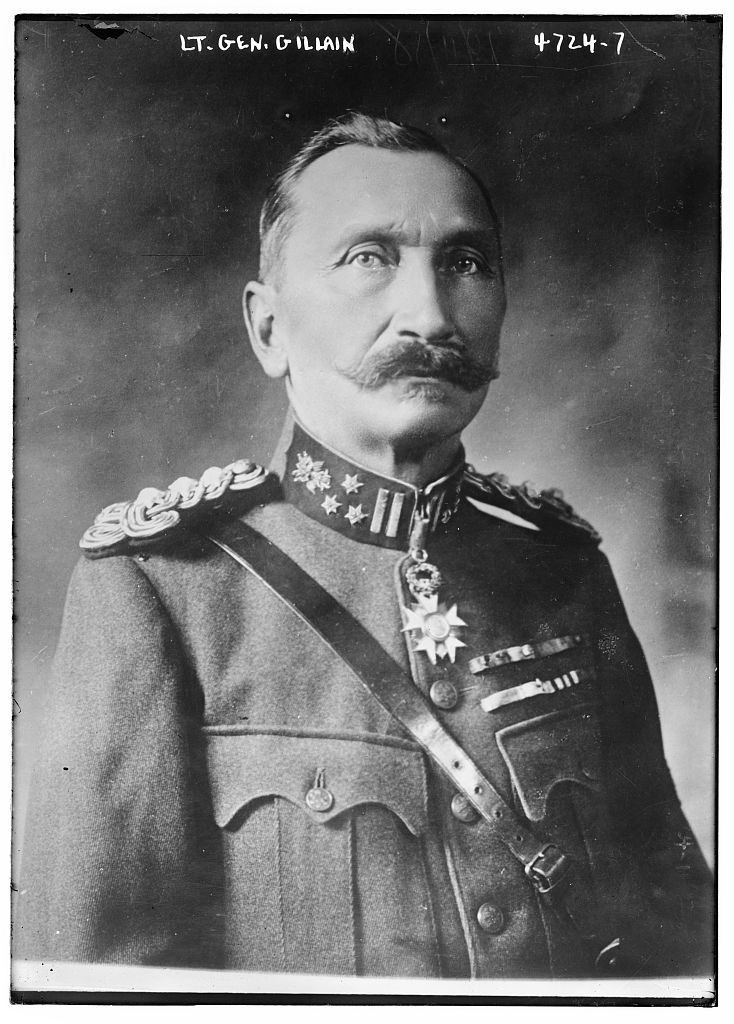
- Born: 11 August 1857; Biesme, Belgium
- Died: 17 August 1931 (aged 74); Uccle, Belgium
- Military career
- Allegiance: Belgium
- Branch: Belgian Army
- Service years: 1875–1920
- Rank: Lieutenant General
- Commands: 4th Lancers; 1st Cavalry Brigade; 5th Infantry Division
- Conflicts: Congo-Arab War; World War I
- Awards: Royal Order of the Lion; Distinguished Service Medal (US)

Cyriaque Cyprien Victor Gillain (11 August 1857 – 17 August 1931) was a Belgian officer who served in World War I and was chief of the Belgian general staff between April 1918 and February 1920.

== Youth and education ==
Gillain was born in Biesme on 11 August 1857, as a son of Adolphe Gillain and Virginie Alexandre. Gillain experienced a difficult youth because he could not agree with his family. To escape from them, he enlisted as a volunteer in the 4th artillery regiment at the age of 18. A few years later, in 1878, he entered the Ecole Militaire. According to fellow students, Gillain never was a brilliant student during his time at the Ecole. He graduated in 1883 with the rank of sous-lieutenant in the artillery, and, at his own request, was transferred to the cavalry a few months later. In 1886, he entered the Ecole de Guerre, which provided further schooling for officers, where he graduated in 1888 as a lieutenant with a degree of the general staff.

== Congo Free State ==
The Belgian king Leopold II had established the Congo Free State in 1885, and the Kings newly founded colony was in need of young, adventurous officers. Gillain departed to Congo in 1888, the same year still of his graduation, being motivated by the better promotional opportunities, and his desire to be among the first explorers of the vast colony. Shortly before his departure, he had become engaged to Adèle Ménétrier, the daughter of an engineer who was the director of a coal mine in Marchienne-au-Pont. Not very long after his arrival, Gillain distinguished himself in a brilliant feat of arms. On the orders of his captain, he was charged with leading a campaign against the Mussuronghe tribe whose pillaging activities impeded commercial development. During the campaign, the first gunshots in Congo were fired on Gillains command during a confrontation. This created such a surprise among the tribal warriors that they fled in panic. Gillain also partook in the campaigns against slavery.

In 1890 Gillain solicited for a position in the largely unexplored upper Congo. He was positioned at the camp of Lusambo, and took part in the Le Marinel expedition along the Lomami river. In late 1890, his superior Paul Le Marinel was tasked by Leopold to set up an expedition into the rich Yeke Kingdom of Msiri in the Katanga region. With Le Marinel gone, Gillain was appointed as commander of the post, which he reorganised and commanded until the end of 1891 when he returned to Belgium. In October 1892, he was promoted to district chief first class, and after his arrival in March 1893, he supported Francis Dhanis in the Congo Arab war, helping him take the stronghold city of Kasombo. After the victory of the Congo Free State against the Arab-Swahili tribes, Gillain returned to his post in Lusambo in April 1894. He remained in Lusambo until, plagued by fevers, he finally returned to Belgium in February 1896.

== Career in Belgium ==
On 26 September 1896, Gillain finally married his fiancée Adèle Menetrier. In 1898, a daughter, Claire Gillain, was born out of the marriage. However, his wife Adèle died ten years later, in 1908. Gillain remarried to her sister, Eugénie, who took over Adèles role in his daughters upbringing.

On a professional level, Gillain received the rank of captain commander in March 1898. In 1900, he was appointed as aide de camp to major general Hallet, and in 1904 as that of general-major Mersch. He was further promoted to major in 1906, lieutenant colonel in 1909 and colonel in 1913.

== First World War ==
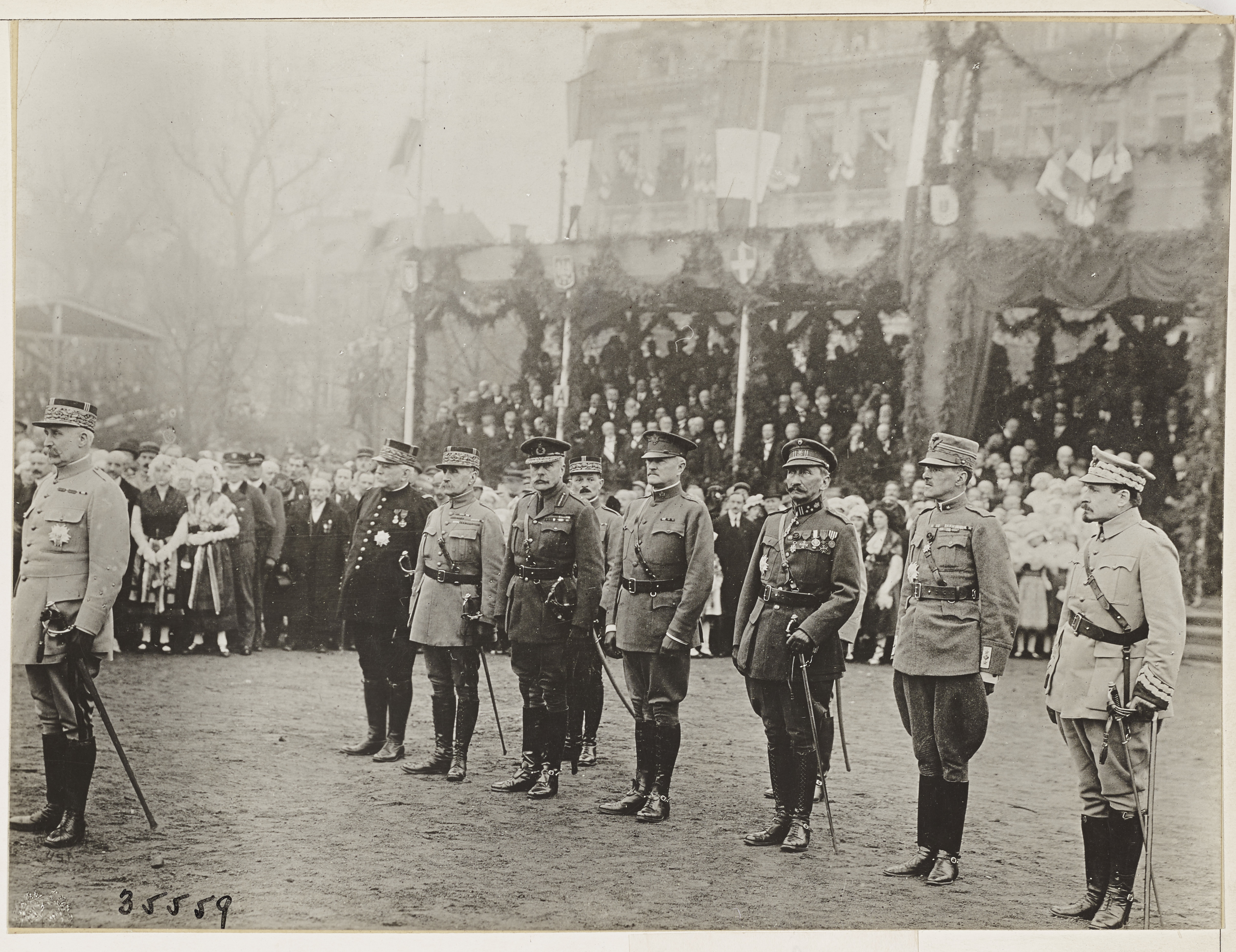
Gillain (third from right) with the other allied commanders at the promotion of General Pétain to marshal

At the outbreak of the First World War, in August 1914, Gillain was the commander of the 4th Lancer regiment. In this function, he soon distinguished himself during the Battle of Halen on 12 August, where the Belgian cavalry was able to defeat their German counterparts in a tactical victory.
On 12 October, he assumed command of the 1st cavalry brigade, with which he took part in the Battle of the Yser. During the war, he was promoted several times, first to major general in February 1915, then lieutenant general in January 1917 when he received the command of the 5th Infantry Division.

Eventually, on 11 April 1918, king Albert appointed Gillain as chief of staff of the army. On 17 April, under his command, the Belgian army was able to put a halt to a German offensive in the Battle of Merckem, a part of the larger Battle of the Lys that culminated in a decisive victory for the Allied forces. After the start of the Hundred Days Offensive, the final stage of the war, Gillain was tasked with the command of the Army reserves, while king Albert assumed command of the offensive operations.

== Later life and career ==
On 28 February 1920, Gillain resigned from his post as chief of staff for reasons of personal health. As a recognition for his service, his was offered the title of baron, but refused. On 28 December 1921, he was co-opted as a senator by the Catholic Party, where he took on the role of vice president of the senate defence committee. At the same time, he also actively participated in colonial propaganda, becoming the first president of the Belgian colonial academy in Antwerp in 1923.

== Death and commemoration ==
Gilliain died on 17 August 1931, at the age of 74, and was given a state funeral on 22 August. He is buried at the cemetery of Marchienne-au-Pont, where a street was also named after him. In his native village of Biesme, a monument in his memory was erected in 1968.

== See also ==
- Royal Museum for Central Africa

Military offices
Preceded by Louis Ruquoy	Chief of the General Staff of the Belgian Army; 10 April 1918 – 4 February 1920	Succeeded by Henri Maglinse
