= Montignies-Saint-Christophe =

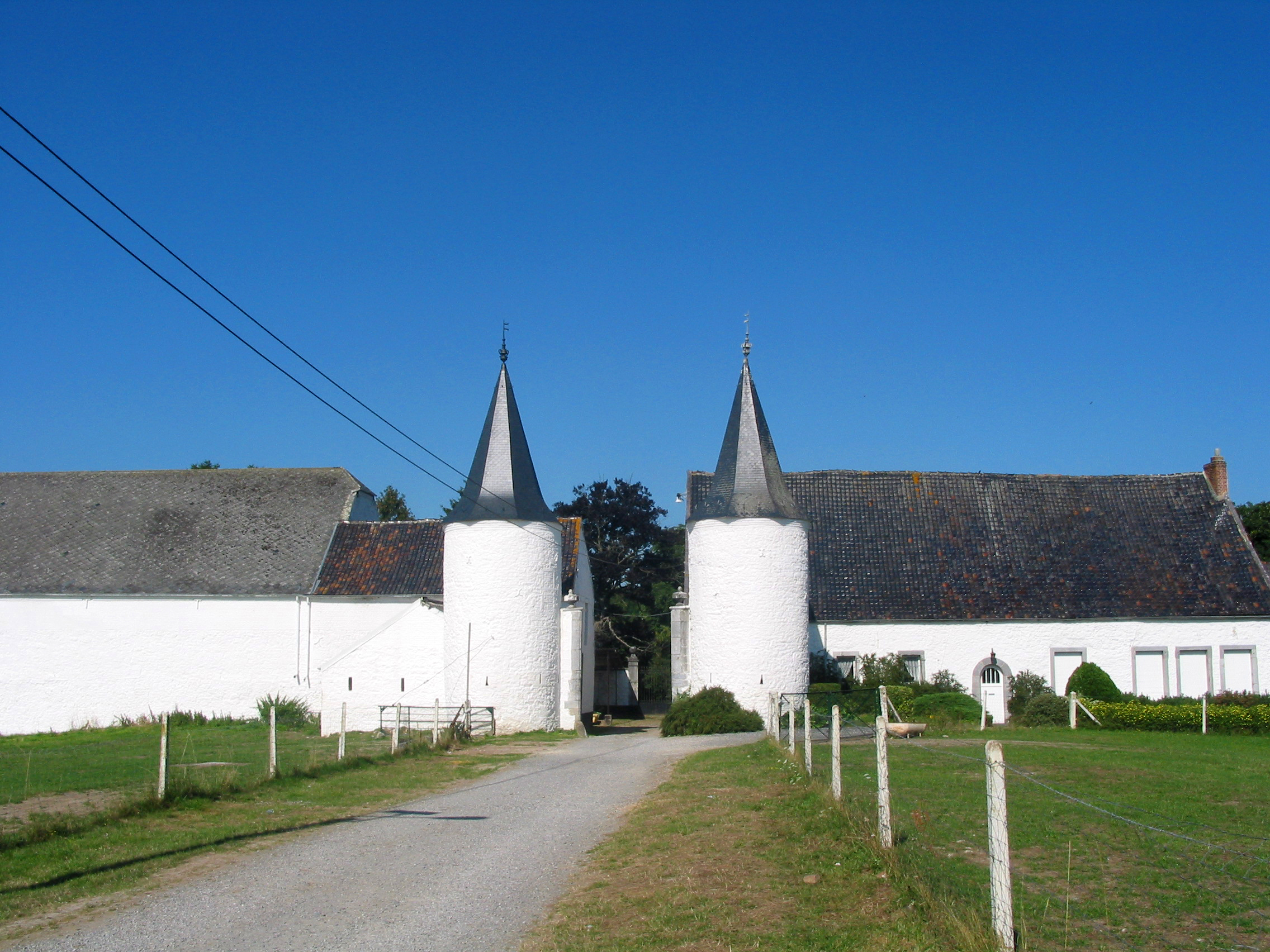
- The Ferme du château in Montignies-Saint-Christophe

- Location within Belgium Location within Europe
- Coordinates: 50°16′53″N 04°11′18″E
- Country: Belgium
- Region: Wallonia
- Province: Hainaut
- Municipality: Erquelinnes

Montignies-Saint-Christophe is a village and district of the municipality of Erquelinnes, located in the Hainaut Province in Wallonia, Belgium.

The village is mentioned in 868, when it was the property of Lobbes Abbey. Agriculture, forestry and quarrying of stone has traditionally been the main economic activities of the village. A Carmelite convent was founded here in 1658; its ruins are still partially visible. The village church dates from the 15th century but was heavily rebuilt in the 19th century. The village also contains an old stone bridge of uncertain age, which locals have baptised the "Roman bridge". A fortified farm, the Ferme du château, located slightly outside the village is a listed historical building.
