= Solre-sur-Sambre Castle =

Castle in Wallonia, France

Coordinates: 50.309°N 4.155°E

- Wallonia, Belgium
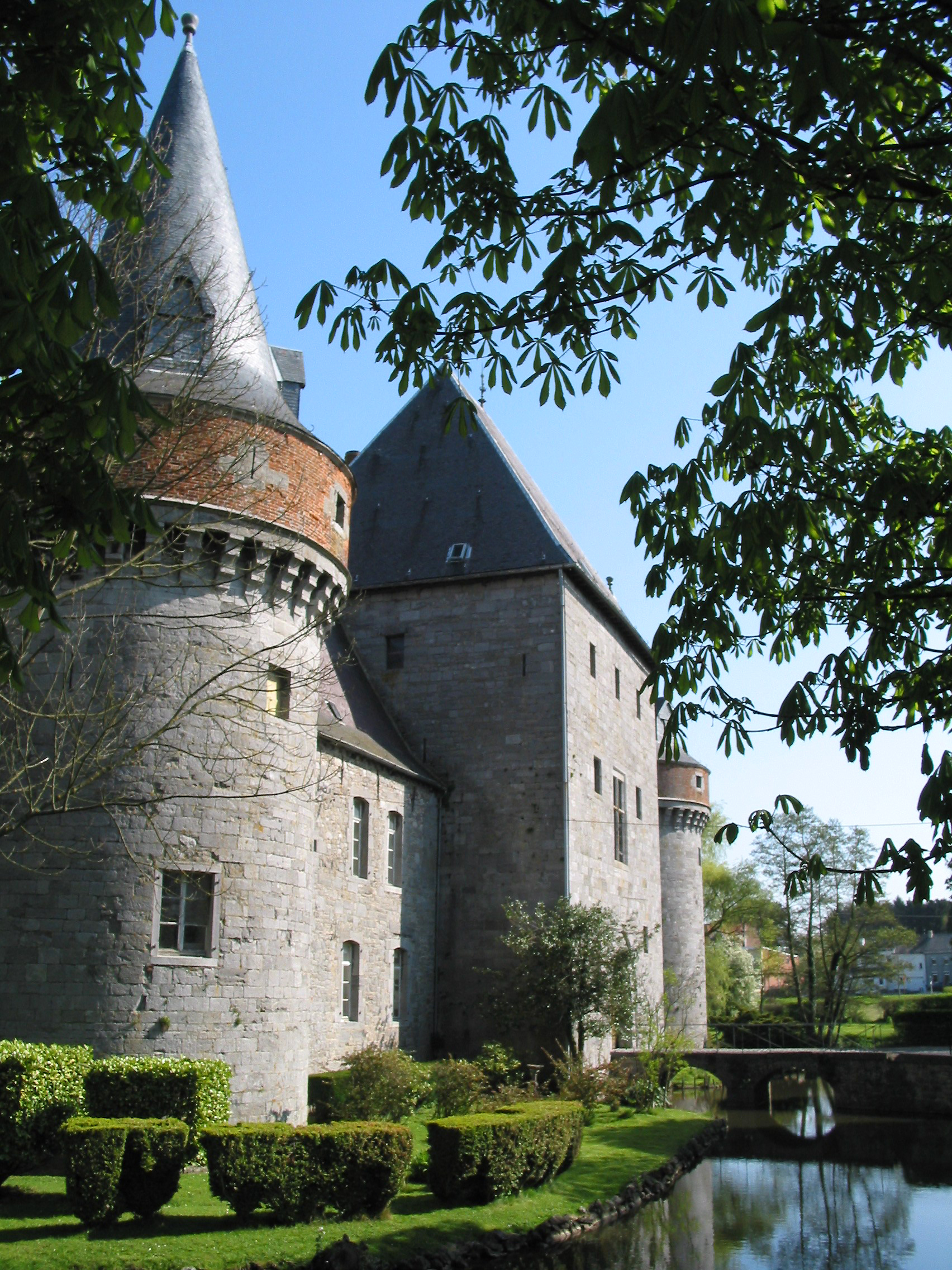

Solre-sur-Sambre Castle (French: Château de Solre-sur-Sambre) is a water castle in Solre-sur-Sambre in the municipality of Erquelinnes, province of Hainaut, Wallonia, Belgium. It is one of the oldest fortified castles in Hainaut, and the property of the Princes de Merode.

== History ==
It was built in the late 13th or early 14th century, near an enclave of the Principality of Liège. The land, then the château, belonged to the Barbençon family. The Lords of Barbençon built a massive rectangular keep, pierced with small openings which were used for defensive purposes. Communication between the groundfloor and the first floor was by a retractable ladder. It was later incorporated into a square castle, with the keep becoming a gate tower.

The property then came by marriage to the de Mortagne family. Around 1480, the château was purchased from Antoine de Mortagne by Jean Carondelet, Grand Chancellor of Burgundy and Flanders. Around 1487 Jean de Carondelet added a floor. Around 1500, he modified the structure of the front towers by surmounting them with conical towers.

Anne-Françoise de Carondelet married Maximilien-Antoine de Mérode, Seigneur of Ham-sur-Heure, in 1628, and the château passed to the House of Merode (Mérode-Deinze branch). In 1637, during the Eighty Years' War, Henri de La Tour d'Auvergne, Viscount of Turenne attacked and took the Castle of Solre-sur-Sambre.

In 1677, during the Franco-Dutch War, French troops under the Comte de Broglie occupied the castle, which guarded one of the few intact bridges on the Sambre.

Marie Théodoline de Merode, born in Villersexel on July 22, 1817, and died in Paris on February 26, 1909, married Alof, marquis de Wignacourt (died in Paris in January 1897) on August 9, 1843. On the death of her father, Félix de Merode (February 7, 1857), Marie Théodoline inherited the château. The estate thus passed into the hands of the Wignacourt family, who occupied it for 132 years.

In 1989, Prince Alexandre de Merode purchased the property from the Wignacourt family. The château is currently owned by Prince Amaury de Mérode, son of a first cousin of Prince Alexandre. As a private residence, it is not open to the public.

== Description ==
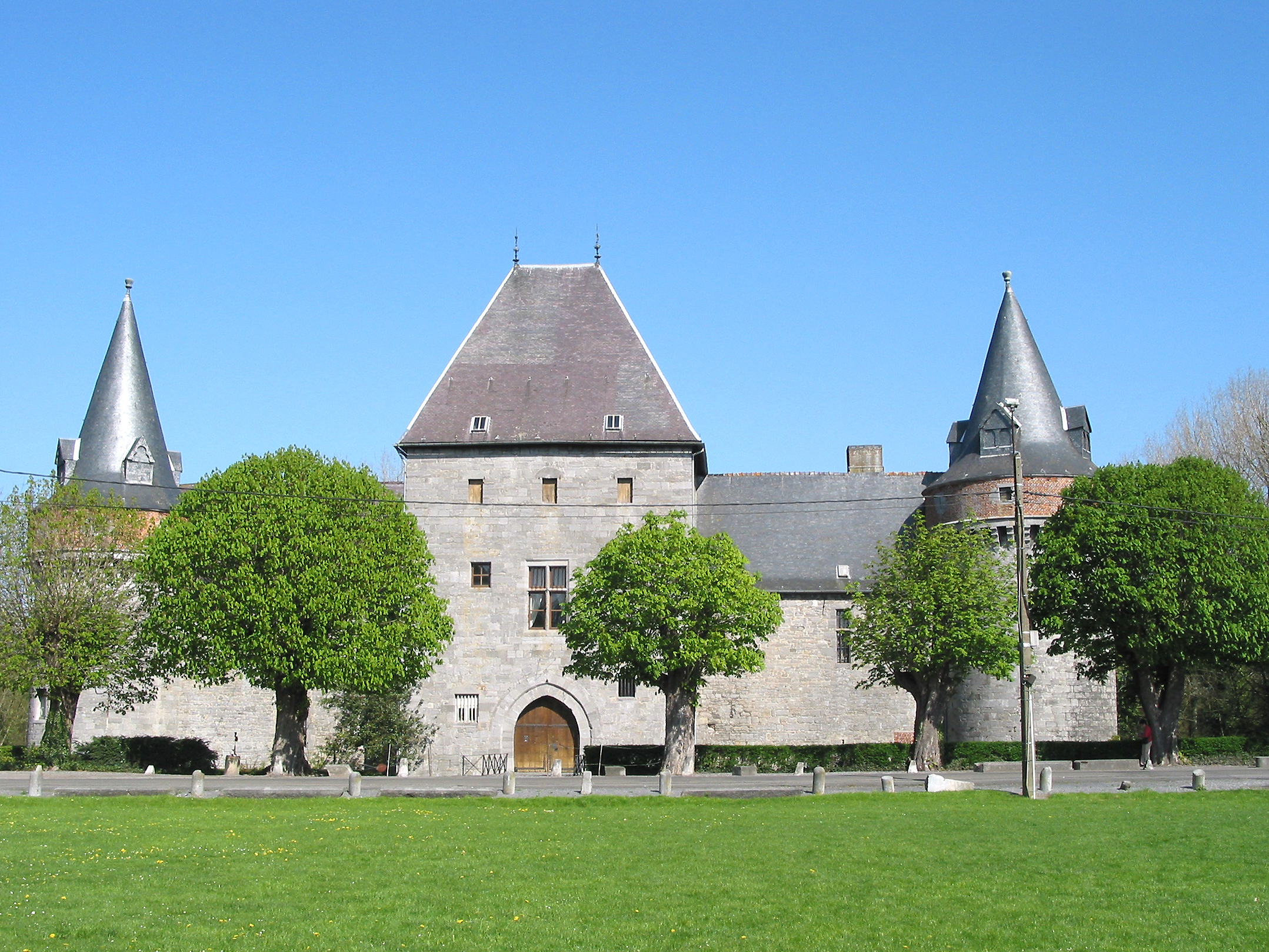
Solre-sur-Sambre

It is situated near an enclave of the commune of Erquelinnes, at the confluence of the Thure and Sambre rivers. Solre-sur-Sambre castle defended the border. An important example of medieval military architecture in Hainaut, it retains its quadrilateral layout, with circular towers reinforcing the four corners.

On the south side, an imposing keep-porch gives access to the inner courtyard. Over time, two smaller buildings have been erected against the curtain walls. Its moat is fed by the waters of the Thure river. The original drawbridge was replaced by a stone version. The château is located on the village square in Solre-sur-Sambre. There is no central heating; heat is supplied by fireplaces.

== See also ==
- List of castles in Belgium
