= Bruyelle =

Bruyelle Briyèle (Picard)
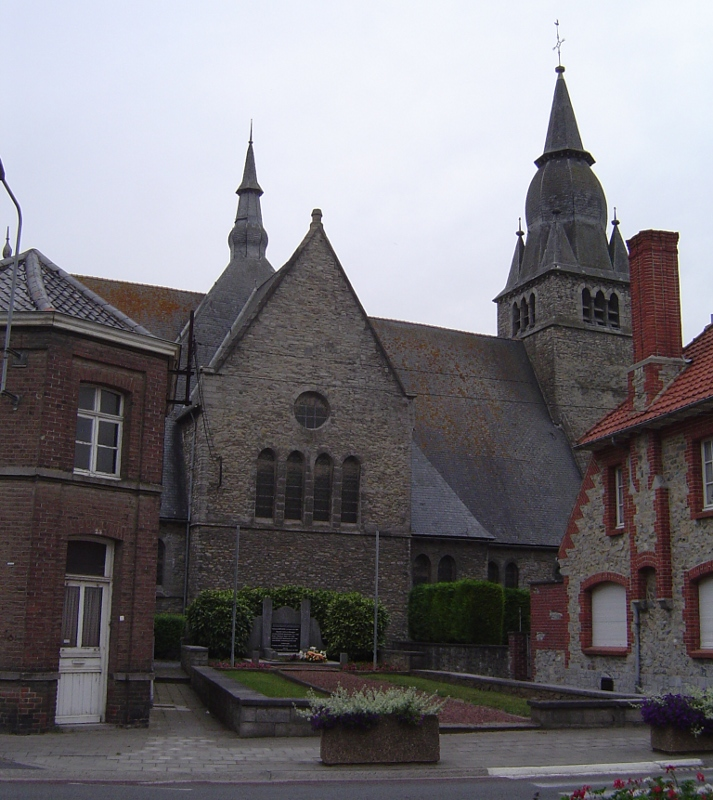
- Bruyelle

- Location in Belgium
- Coordinates: 50°33′N 03°25′E
- Country: Belgium
- Region: Wallonia
- Province: Hainaut
- Municipality: Antoing

Bruyelle (Picard: Briyèle) is a village of Wallonia and a district of the municipality of Antoing, located in the province of Hainaut, Belgium.

A settlement has existed here since Roman times. Remnants of destroyed buildings may be testimony that the village was destroyed by Chauci invaders between the years 172 and 179. In the 12th century, the village belonged to Saint Peter's Abbey, Ghent. During World War I, the village church was destroyed by the Germans, and later rebuilt in a different style. Still preserved however is a farmhouse partially dating to the 12th century. Historically, stone has been quarried in the village.

The British Bruyelle War Cemetery lies in the village.
