= Biesme =

Biesme Bieme (Walloon)
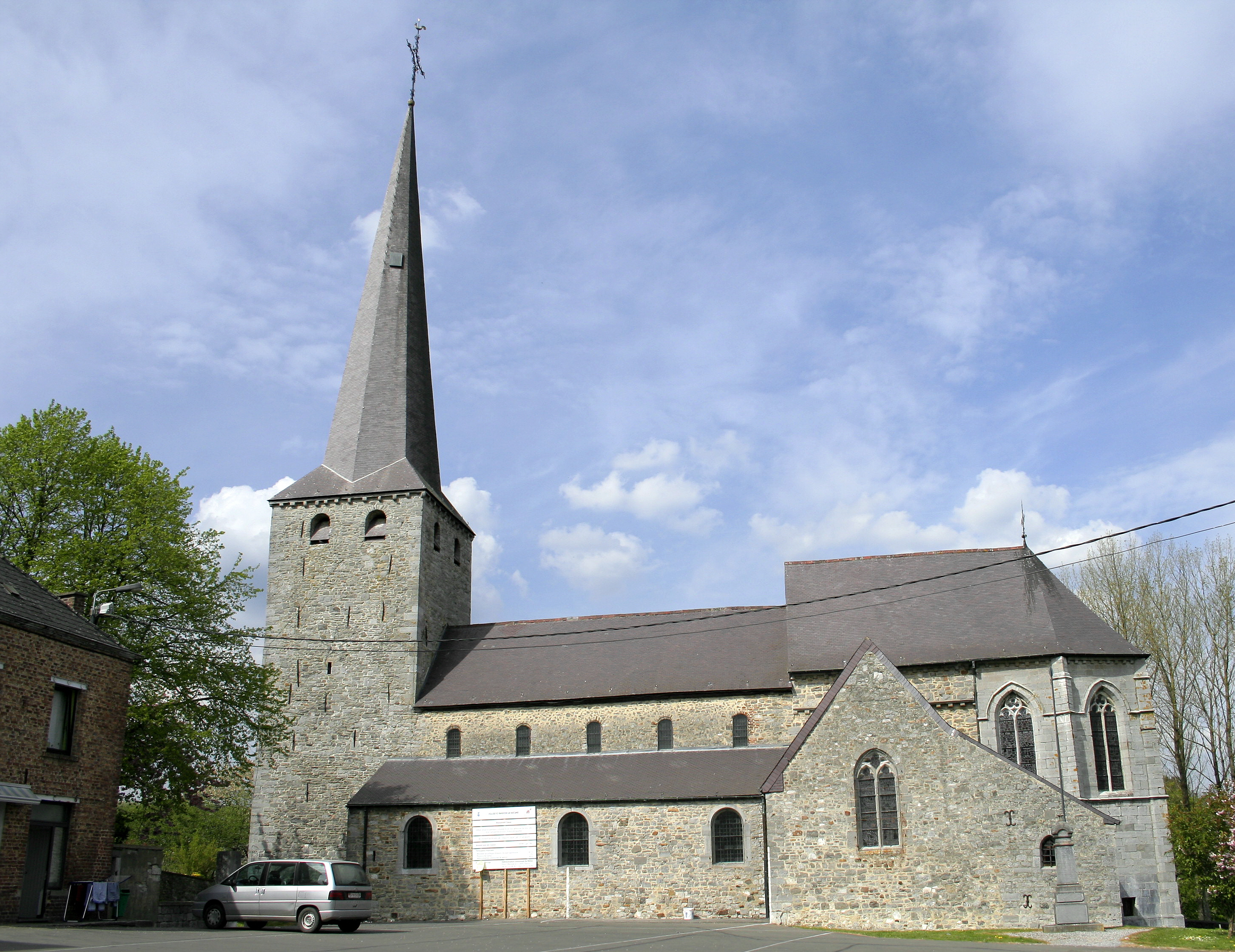
- Biesme, church of St Martin

- Location within Belgium Location within Europe
- Coordinates: 50°18′N 04°36′E
- Country: Belgium
- Region: Wallonia
- Province: Namur
- Municipality: Mettet

Biesme (French pronunciation: [bjɛm]; Walloon: Bieme) is a village of Wallonia and a district of the municipality of Mettet, located in the province of Namur, Belgium.

== History and heritage ==
There has been a settlement in the area at least since the time of the Merovingians. During the Middle Ages, the village belonged to the counts of Namur. The village church, dedicated to Saint Martin, was built in the 11th century. The nave and the tower are Romanesque in style, while the larger transept and chancel are Gothic. Inside, the church is decorated with stuccoed ceilings from 1760. In Biesme there is also a castle, dating from the 16th and 17th centuries and surrounded by a park. North of the village, towards Mettet, there is a chapel dedicated to Saint Roch, built in 1635 in attempt to ward of the plague.

== Notable people ==
- Cyriaque Gillain, Belgian general (1857–1931), born in Biesme
