= Solre-sur-Sambre =

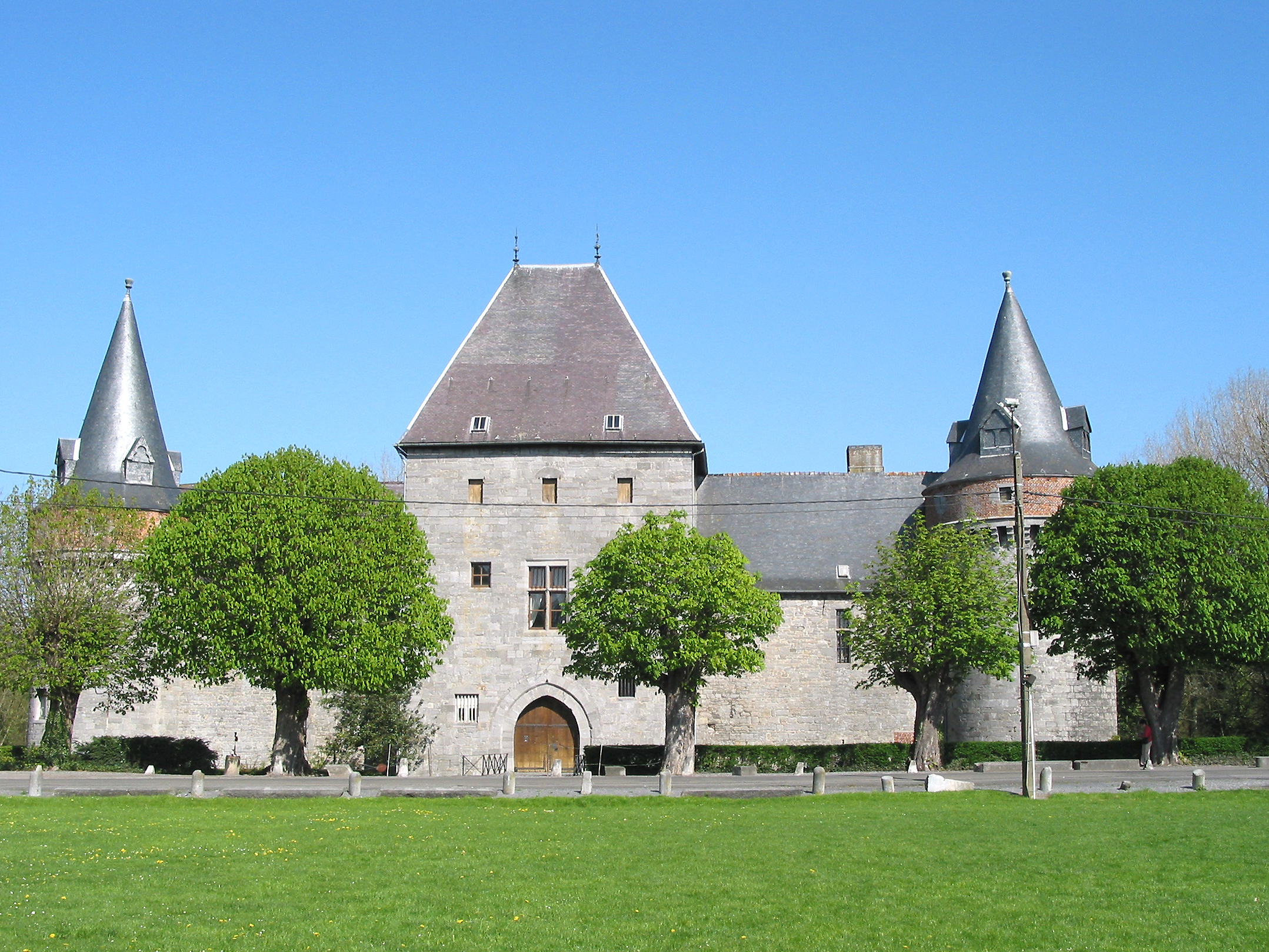
- Solre-sur-Sambre Castle

- Coat of arms

- Location within Belgium Location within Europe
- Coordinates: 50°18′24″N 04°09′20″E
- Country: Belgium
- Region: Wallonia
- Province: Hainaut
- Municipality: Erquelinnes

Solre-sur-Sambre is a village and district of the municipality of Erquelinnes, located in the Hainaut Province in Wallonia, Belgium.

The village lies at the confluence of the rivers Thure and Sambre. The area has been inhabited since Roman times; in 2007 archaeologists discovered the remains of a large Roman villa in Solre-sur-Sambre. The village church, dedicated to Saint Medardus, is partially medieval and has tracery windows from the 13th century. There is also a 15th-century chapel in the village. The Solre-sur-Sambre Castle traces its origins to the 12th century, and is a well-preserved medieval fortress.
