= Émile Royer =

Belgian politician

Émile Royer (27 April 1866 – 16 May 1916) was a Belgian socialist politician and member of the Chamber of Representatives.

Royer obtained a law degree at the Free University of Brussels on 4 November 1887 and soon began practicing law in Brussels. In 1903 he represented the anarchist Gennaro Rubino at his trial for having attempted to assassinate King Leopold II the previous year.

Royer had joined the Belgian Workers' Party in 1894, and in 1908 was elected a member of parliament for the Tournai-Ath constituency. Royer became a leader of the Walloon Movement and strongly opposed the annexationist policies of Belgian nationalists such as Pierre Nothomb, Fernand Neuray, and Maurice des Ombiaux. Royer died in Paris on 16 May 1916.
