= Erquelinnes =

Municipality in Hainaut Province, Wallonia, Belgium

Erquelinnes Erkelene (Walloon)
- Municipality
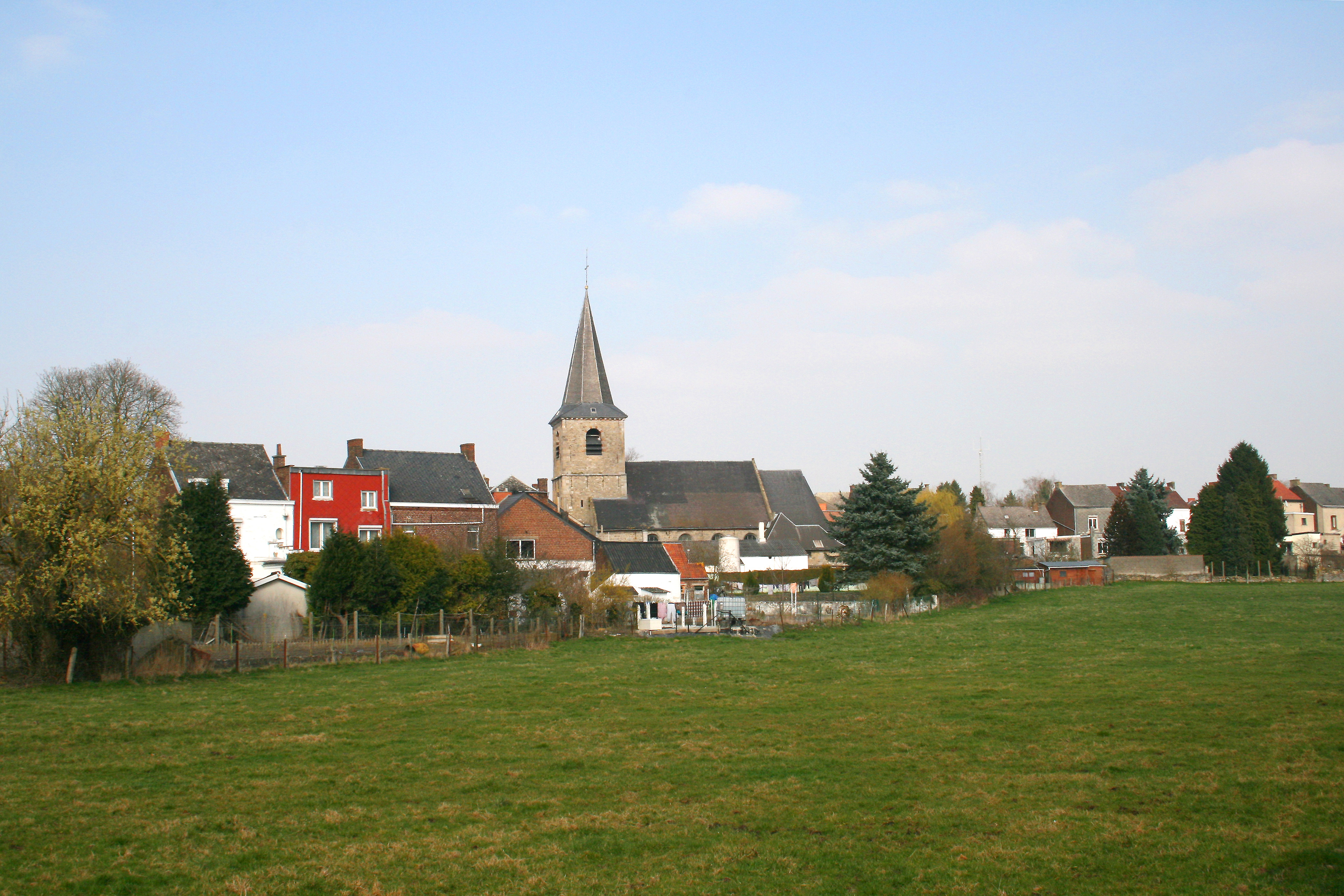

- Flag Coat of arms

- Location of Erquelinnes in Hainaut
- Interactive map of Erquelinnes
- Location in Belgium
- Coordinates: 50°18′N 04°07′E
- Country: Belgium
- Community: French Community
- Region: Wallonia
- Province: Hainaut
- Arrondissement: Thuin

Government
  - Mayor: David Lavaux
  - Governing party: IC

Area
  - Total: 44.54 km^{2} (17.20 sq mi)

Population (2026-01-01)
  - Total: 9,941
  - Density: 223.2/km^{2} (578.1/sq mi)
- Postal codes: 6560
- NIS code: 56022
- Area codes: 071
- Website: www.erquelinnes.be

Erquelinnes (French pronunciation: [ɛʁkəlin]; Walloon: Erkelene) is a municipality of Wallonia located in the province of Hainaut, Belgium.

Located on the border with France, where the commune of Maubeuge lies, Erquelinnes had a total resident population of 9,549, in 2006. The total area is 44.23 km^{2} (17.08 sq mi) which gives a population density of 216 inhabitants per km^{2}.

The municipality consists of the following districts: Bersillies-l'Abbaye, Erquelinnes, Grand-Reng, Hantes-Wihéries, Montignies-Saint-Christophe, and Solre-sur-Sambre.

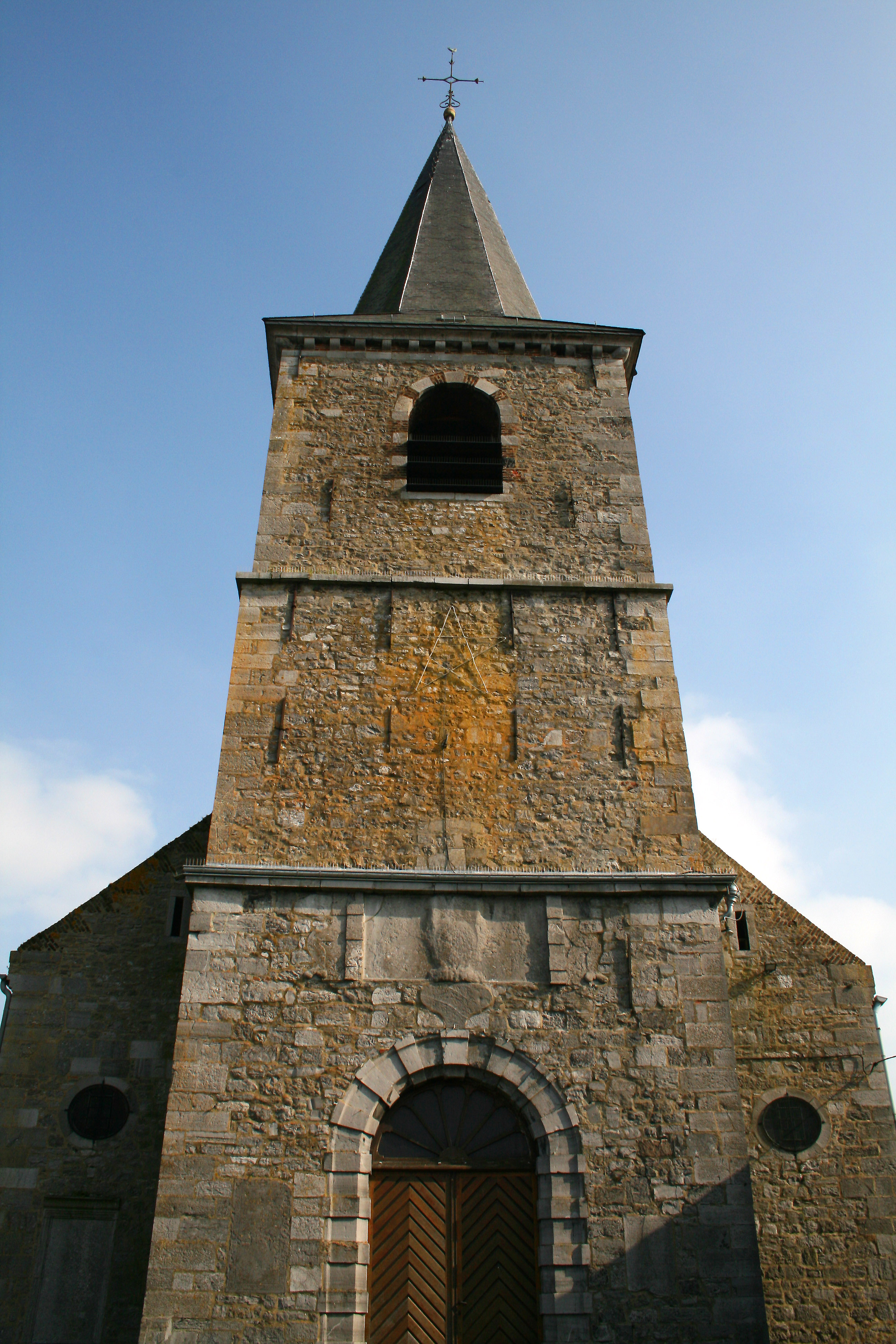
Saint George's church

== Heritage ==
- The Solre-sur-Sambre Castle
