= N31 road (Belgium) =

National Route 31
- Dutch: Nationale Weg 31; French: Route nationale 31

Major junctions
- North end: Ostend
- South end: Roeselare

Location
- Country: Belgium
- Provinces: West Flanders

Highway system
- Highways of Belgium; Motorways; National Roads

The N31 is a regional road in Belgium that runs from the coastal city of Ostend southward to Roeselare in West Flanders province. It connects the North Sea coast with inland urban centers and supports local commuter and freight traffic.

== Route ==
The N31 begins in Ostend, near the port and city center, then heads southeast through towns such as Ichtegem and Torhout. The road serves residential, commercial, and agricultural areas and links with multiple regional routes along its course. It terminates in Roeselare, connecting with major roads like the N36 and N37.

The N31 is primarily a two-lane road with additional turning lanes in busier sections near towns. Recent maintenance efforts have focused on resurfacing, improved road markings, and upgraded safety signage.

The route experiences moderate traffic volumes, particularly during rush hours and tourist seasons. It is an important corridor for freight transport between the port of Ostend and inland distribution centers.

== Major junctions ==
- Ostend – Starting point, connection with N34 and port access
- Ichtegem – Junctions with local roads
- Torhout – Intersection with N375 and regional roads
- Roeselare – Terminus, connection with N36, N37, and urban network
