= Antoing =

City in Hainaut Province, Wallonia, Belgium

Antoing Antweon (Picard)
- Municipality
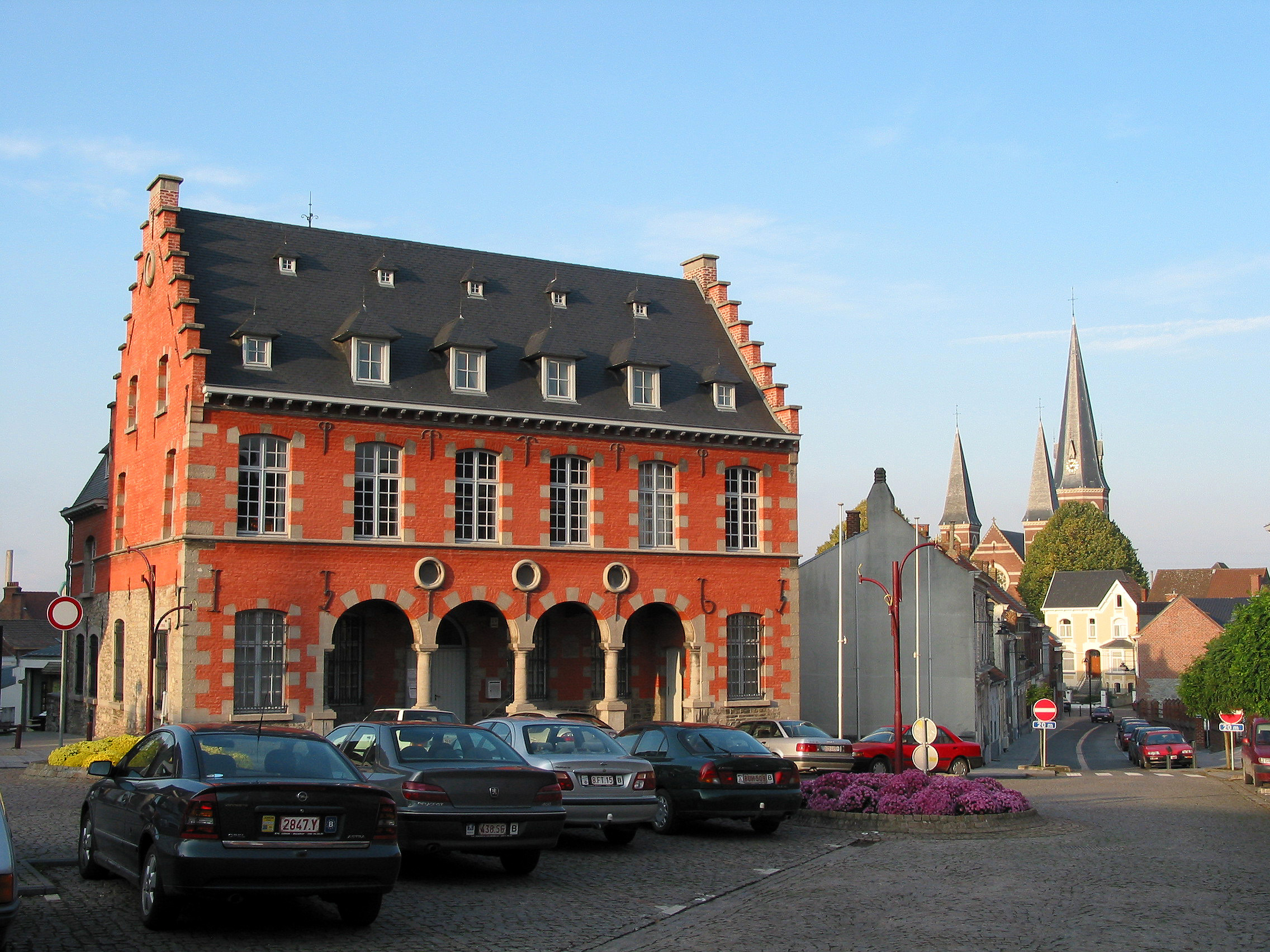

- Flag Coat of arms

- Interactive map of Antoing
- Location in Belgium
- Coordinates: 50°34′N 03°27′E
- Country: Belgium
- Community: French Community
- Region: Wallonia
- Province: Hainaut
- Arrondissement: Tournai

Government
  - Mayor: Bernard Bauwens

Area
  - Total: 31.33 km^{2} (12.10 sq mi)

Population (2026-01-01)
  - Total: 7,602
  - Density: 242.6/km^{2} (628.4/sq mi)
- Postal codes: 7640-7643
- NIS code: 57003
- Area codes: 069

Antoing (French pronunciation: [ɑ̃twɛ̃]; Picard: Antweon) is a city and municipality of Wallonia located in the province of Hainaut, Belgium.

The municipality consists of the following districts: Antoing, Bruyelle, Calonne, Fontenoy, Maubray, and Péronnes-lez-Antoing.

== History ==
The Battle of Fontenoy, a major battle in the War of Austrian Succession, was fought near Fontenoy village on 11 May 1745.

== Places of interest ==
- Antoing Castle, originally from the 12th century, restored by Eugène Viollet-le-Duc in the 19th century
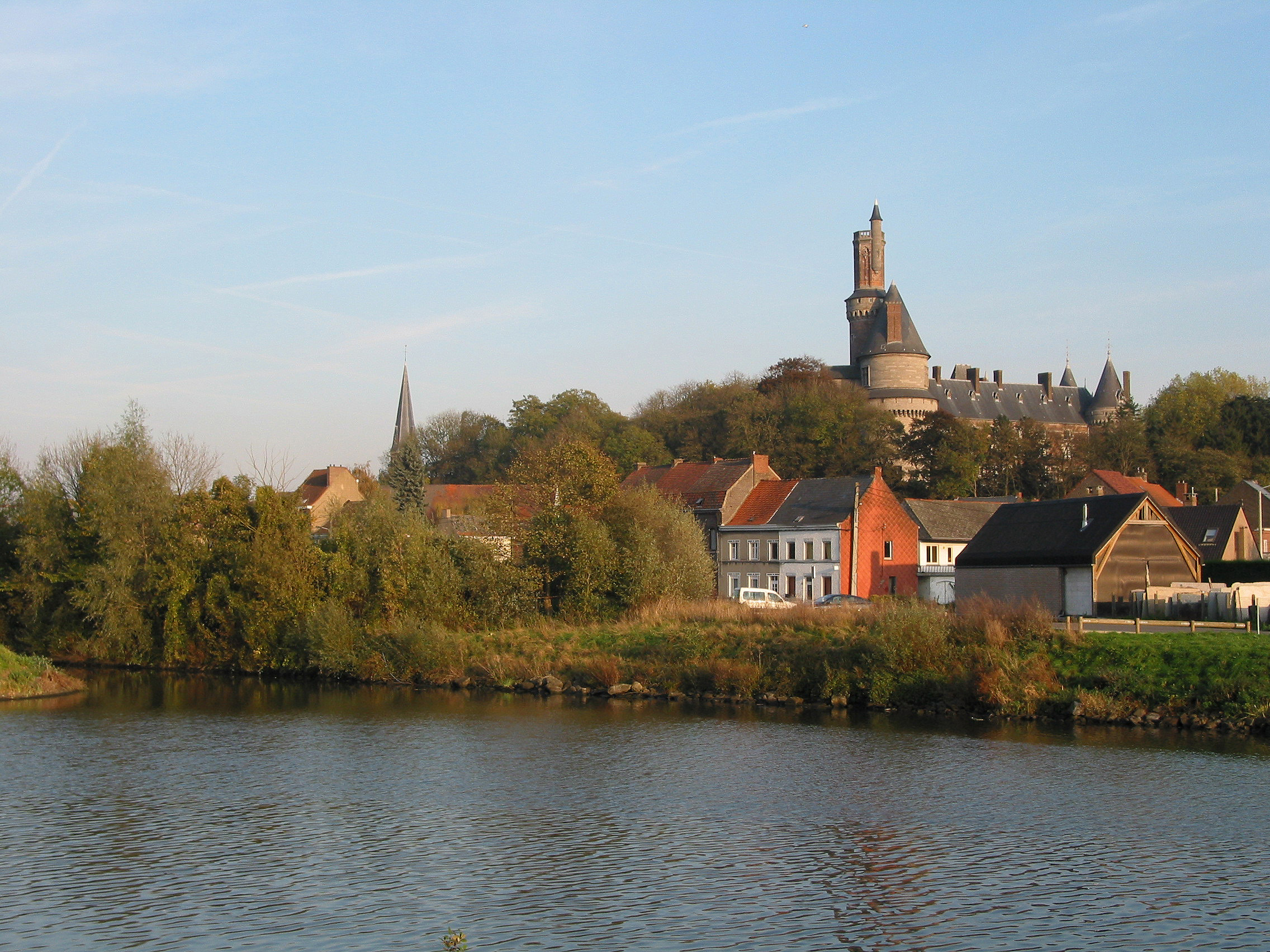
Antoing Castle, castle of the Princes de Ligne (13th - 16th centuries)

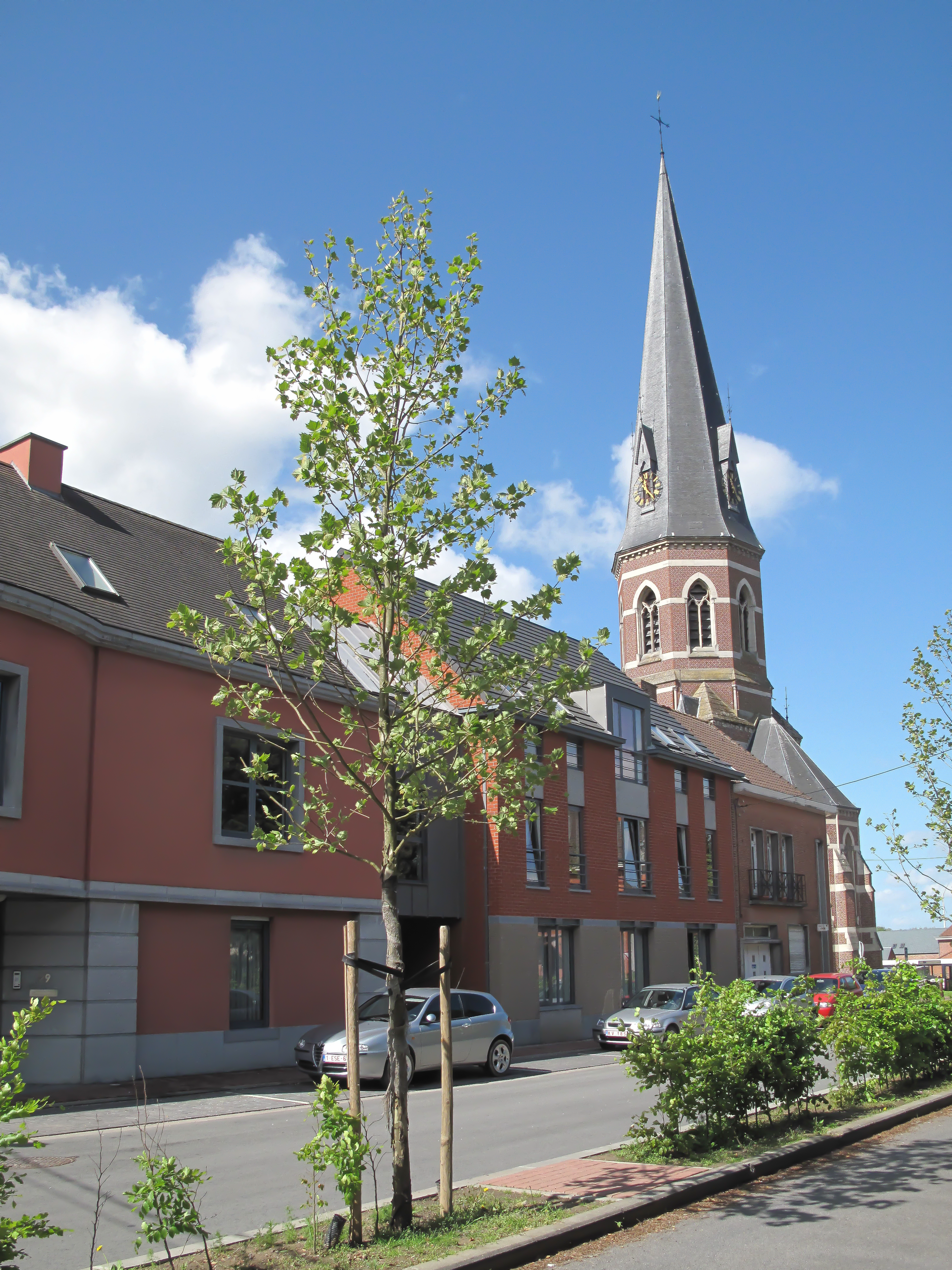
Churchtower (l'église Saint-Pierre)

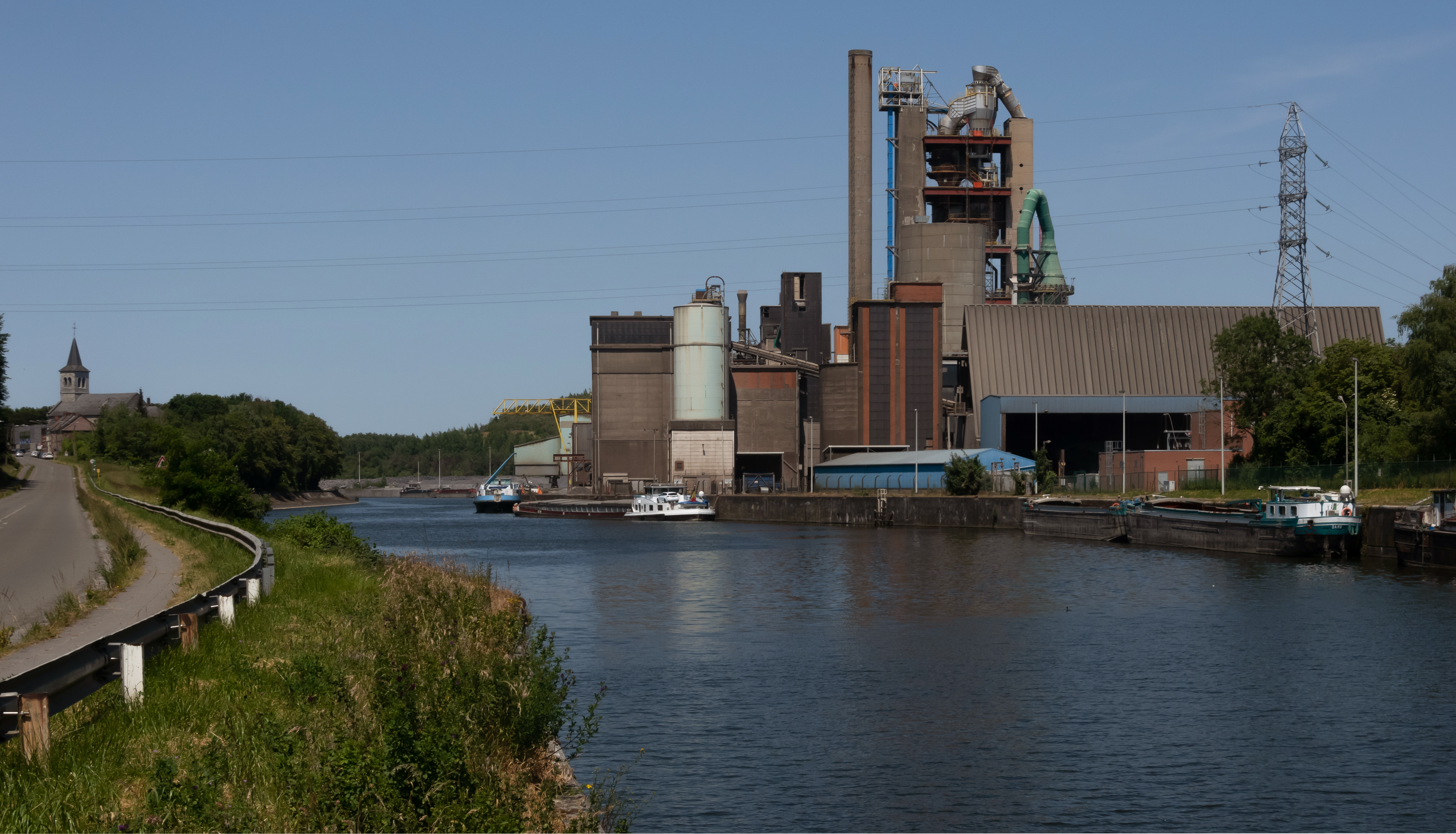
Calonne, industrial area along the Scheldt

== Famous inhabitants ==
- Raoul Cauvin, comics writer, was born in Antoing in 1938
