= N32 road (Belgium) =

Road in Belgium

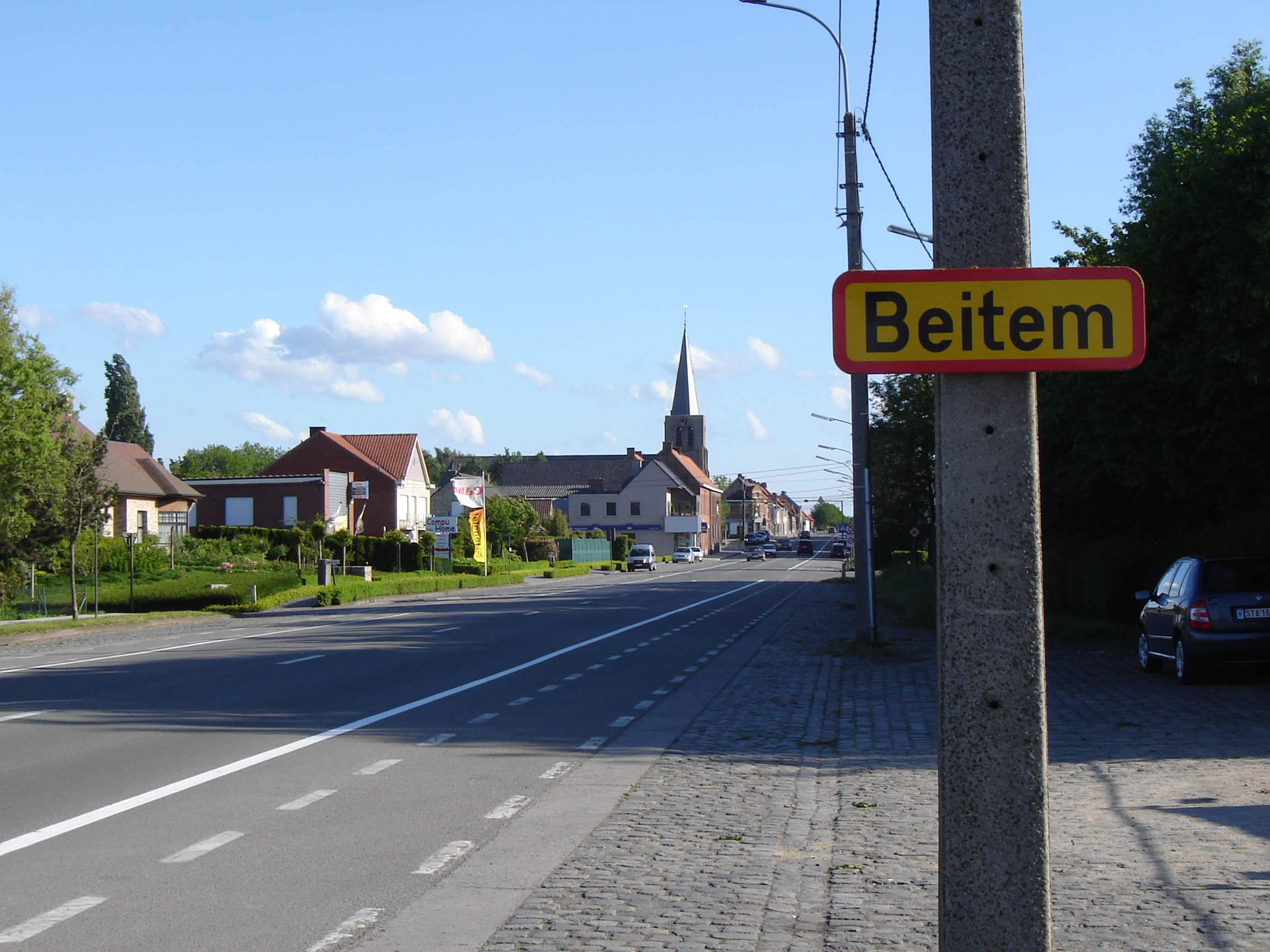
View on the village/hHamlet of Beitem. Entering from Roeselare centre along the Meensesteenweg street (N32). Beitem, in Rumbeke, Roeselare, West-Flanders, Belgium

The N32 is a national road in Belgium that runs through the provinces of West Flanders and East Flanders. It connects the historic city of Bruges to the city of Roeselare, continuing south toward Menen and the French border at Halluin, where it links with France’s road network. The total length of the road is approximately 54 kilometers (33.6 miles).

== Route description ==
The N32 passes through several towns including Zedelgem, Torhout, and Lichtervelde, acting as a regional connector and alternative to major motorways like the E403 and E40.

Although it is not classified as a motorway, the N32 is an important corridor for local and regional traffic, especially for towns not directly served by the highway network.

== Infrastructure and road conditions ==
The road is paved and generally well-maintained, but conditions vary along its length. Some segments feature designated bike lanes, although many of these are considered narrow or poorly designed, which has led to criticism from cyclists.

A 4.2 km section in Zedelgem (Torhoutsesteenweg) has been fitted with permanent average speed checks as part of a Flemish government initiative to improve traffic safety.

== History ==
The precise construction date of the N32 is not documented, but it is widely believed that the road was built or significantly upgraded between the 1960s and 1970s, during a period of major infrastructure expansion in Belgium.

Before modernization, the route likely followed or paralleled older regional trade routes that historically linked Bruges to inland towns and the French border.

== Economic and regional importance ==
Despite not being a motorway, the N32 plays an essential role in regional connectivity. It supports local economies by linking industrial zones, residential areas, and commercial districts, and serves as a commuter route between Bruges, Roeselare, and Menen.

The road is also a key link for cross-border trade and transportation between Belgium and northern France.

== Cycling and environmental considerations ==
Cyclists have expressed concerns about the limited and sometimes unsafe cycling infrastructure along the N32. With increasing regional emphasis on sustainable transportation, improvements to bike infrastructure may be prioritized in future mobility plans.

== Future developments ==
There are no major reconstruction projects currently announced, but periodic upgrades for traffic management and safety enforcement, such as additional speed control systems, are expected.
