= Gaurain-Ramecroix =

Coordinates: 50°35′N 3°29′E

Gaurain-Ramecroix is a village of Wallonia and a district of the municipality of Tournai, located in the province of Hainaut, Belgium.
