= List of rivers of Belgium =

These are the main rivers that flow wholly or partially in Belgium or have Belgian tributaries.

All of Belgium is drained into the North Sea, except the municipality of Momignies (Macquenoise), which is drained by the river Oise into the English Channel. Rivers that flow into the sea are sorted alphabetically. Rivers that flow into other rivers are sorted by the proximity of their points of confluence to the sea. Some rivers (e.g. Moselle, Rhine, Seine) do not flow through Belgium themselves, but they are mentioned for having Belgian tributaries. They are given in italics. Below, the Belgian rivers are given alphabetically. See also Category:Rivers of Belgium. If the names are different in French, Dutch or German, they are given in parentheses (only given if the river flows in French, Dutch or German-speaking territory).

Note for additions: Please remember to add the city where the river meets for each river. For an alphabetical overview of rivers of Belgium, see the category Category:Rivers of Belgium.

== By basin ==
=== Meuse ===
- Grevelingen, Krammer, Volkerak (branches in the Netherlands)
  - Dintel (in Dintelsas, Netherlands)
    - Mark (near Oudenbosch, Netherlands)
      - Aa of Weerijs (in Breda, Netherlands)
- Meuse (Dutch: Maas) (main branch at Stellendam, Netherlands)
  - Dieze (in 's-Hertogenbosch, Netherlands)
    - Dommel (in 's-Hertogenbosch, Netherlands)
  - Rur (Dutch: Roer) (in Roermond, Netherlands)
    - Inde (in Jülich, Germany)
  - Geul (French: Gueule, German: Göhl) (near Meerssen, Netherlands)
    - Gulp (French: Galoppe) (near Gulpen, Netherlands)
  - Jeker (French: Geer) (in Maastricht, Netherlands)
  - Voer (French: Fouron) (in Eijsden, Netherlands)
  - Berwinne (Dutch: Berwijn) (near Visé)
  - Ourthe (in Liège)
    - Vesdre (German: Weser) (near Liège)
      - Hoëgne (in Pepinster)
      - Gileppe (in Limbourg)
    - Amblève (German: Amel) (in Comblain-au-Pont)
      - Salm (in Trois-Ponts)
      - Eau Rouge (near Stavelot)
      - Warche (near Malmedy)
  - Hoyoux (in Huy)
  - Mehaigne (in Huy)
    - Burdinale (near Burdinne)
  - Sambre (in Namur)
  - Bocq (in Yvoir)
  - Molignée (in Anhée)
  - Lesse (in Dinant-Anseremme)
  - Viroin (in Vireux-Molhain, France)
  - Semois (in Monthermé, France)
    - Rulles (near Tintigny)
      - Mellier (near Marbehan)
      - Mandebras (near Rulles)
  - Chiers (in Bazeilles, France)

=== Rhine ===
- Rhine (main branch at Hook of Holland, Netherlands)
  - Moselle (in Koblenz, Germany)
    - Sauer (French: Sûre) (in Wasserbillig, Luxembourg)
      - Our (in Wallendorf, Germany)
      - Alzette (in Ettelbruck, Luxembourg)
        - Attert (in Colmar-Berg, Luxembourg)

=== Scheldt ===
- Scheldt (Dutch: Schelde, French: Escaut) (near Flushing, Netherlands)
  - Rupel (in Rupelmonde)
    - Nete (in Rumst)
      - Kleine Nete (in Lier)
        - Aa (in Grobbendonk)
        - Wamp (in Kasterlee)
      - Grote Nete (in Lier)
        - Wimp (in Herenthout)
        - Molse Nete (in Geel)
        - Laak (in Westerlo)
    - Dijle (French: Dyle) (in Rumst)
      - Zenne (French: Senne) (near Mechelen)
        - Maalbeek (in Grimbergen)
        - Woluwe (in Vilvoorde)
          - Kleine Maalbeek (in Kraainem)
        - Maalbeek (French: Maelbeek) (in Schaerbeek)
        - Molenbeek (in Brussels-Laken)
        - Neerpedebeek (in Anderlecht-Neerpede)
        - Zuun (in Sint-Pieters-Leeuw-Zuun)
        - Geleytsbeek (in Drogenbos)
        - Linkebeek (in Drogenbos)
        - Molenbeek (in Lot)
        - Senette (in Tubize)
          - Hain (in Tubize)
          - Samme (in Braine-le-Comte-Ronquières)
            - Thines (in Nivelles)
      - Demer (near Rotselaar)
        - Velp (in Halen)
        - Gete (in Halen)
          - Grote Gete (in Zoutleeuw)
          - Kleine Gete (in Zoutleeuw)
        - Herk (in Herk-de-Stad)
      - Voer (in Leuven)
      - IJse (in Huldenberg-Neerijse)
      - Nethen (in Grez-Doiceau-Nethen)
      - Laan (in Huldenberg-Terlanen-Sint-Agatha-Rode)
        - Zilverbeek (in Rixensart-Genval)
      - Thyle (in Court-Saint-Étienne)
        - Orne (in Court-Saint-Étienne)
          - Houssière (in Mont-Saint-Guibert)
  - Durme (near Temse)
  - Dender (French: Dendre) (in Dendermonde)
    - Mark (French: Marcq) (in Lessines)
    - Ruisseau d'Ancre (in Lessines)
    - Zulle (in Ath)
    - Oostelijke Dender (in Ath)
    - Westelijke Dender (in Ath)
  - Lys (Dutch: Leie) (in Ghent)
    - Mandel (in Wielsbeke)
    - Gaverbeek (in Kortrijk)
    - Douve (in Comines-Warneton)
  - Rooigembeek (in Gavere)
  - Zwalm (in Zwalm)
  - Rone (in Kluisbergen)
    - Rhosne (in Ronse)
  - Haine (in Condé-sur-l'Escaut, France)
    - Hogneau (in Condé-sur-l'Escaut)
      - Honelle (in Quiévrain)
        - Aunelle (..)
        - Grande Honelle (..)
        - Petite Honelle (..)
    - Trouille (in Mons)
    - Obrecheuil (near Mons)

=== Seine ===
- Seine (entering the English Channel in an estuary between Le Havre and Honfleur)
  - Oise (near Paris, France)

=== Yser ===
- Yser (Dutch: IJzer) (in Nieuwpoort)
  - Ieperlee (in Diksmuide)

== See also ==
- List of lakes of Belgium
- Zeeschelde
- Oehl
