= Hermitage at Schaelsberg =

Building in Valkenburg aan de Geul, Netherlands

- Kluis op de Schaelsberg; Kloes op de Sjaatsberg
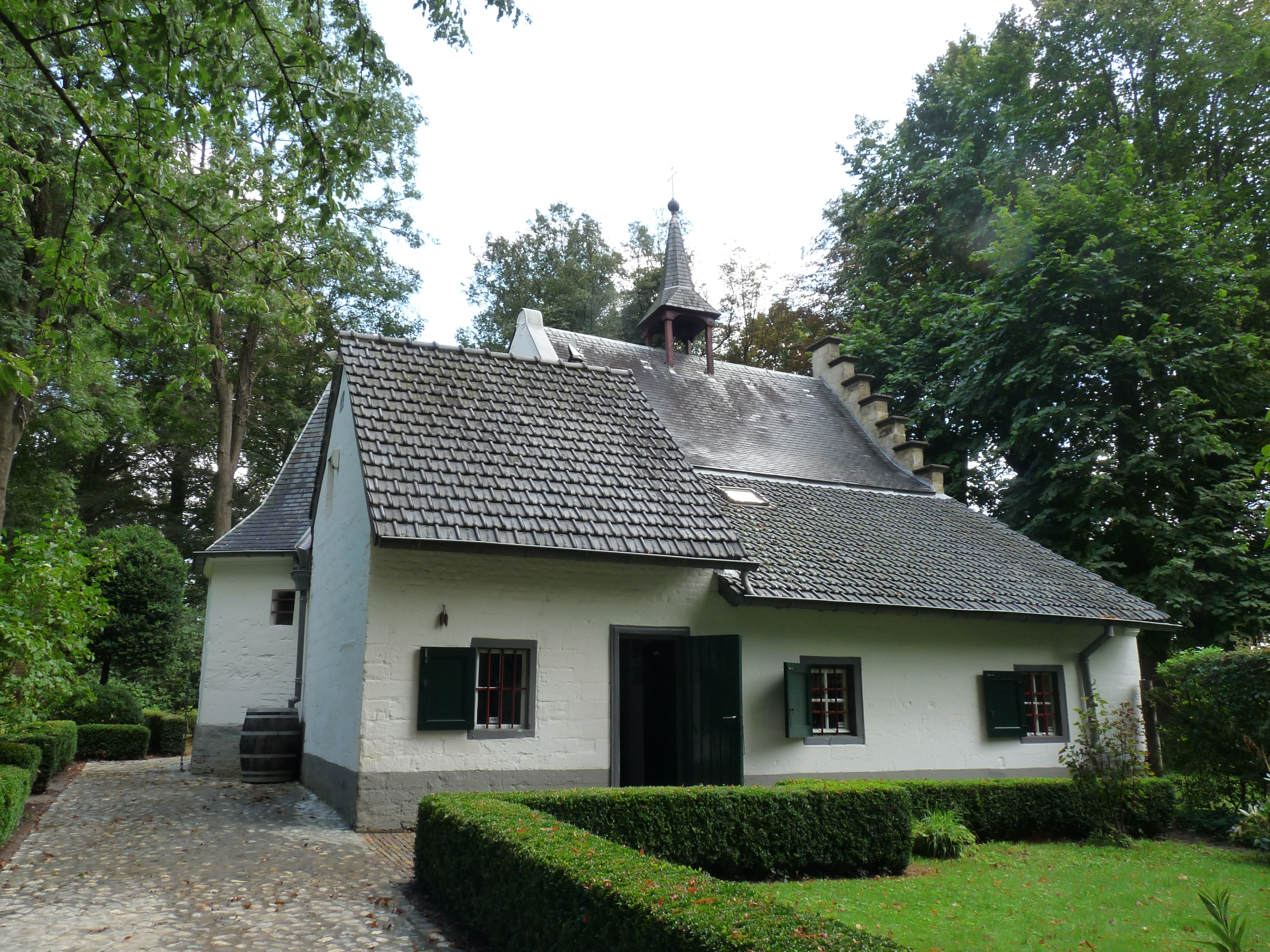
- Chapel in 2011
- Interactive map of the Hermitage at Schaelsberg area

General information
- Status: Rijksmonument (36829)
- Type: Chapel
- Location: Molenweg 2, Schin op Geul, Netherlands
- Coordinates: 50.860692°N 5.855542°E
- Completed: 1688

Design and construction
- Designations: Monument (1967-present); Hermitage (1688-1930)

References
- Church buildings in Limburg

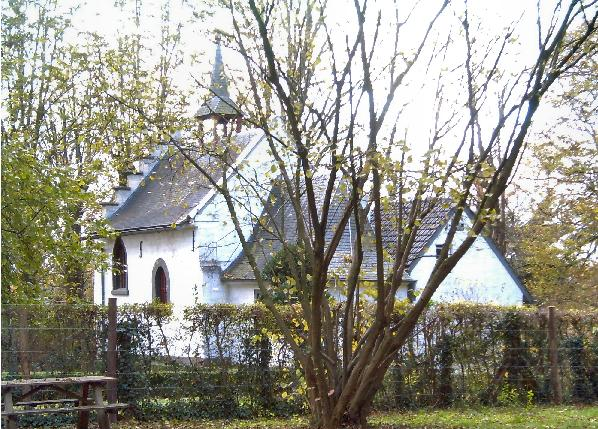
The chapel in 2005

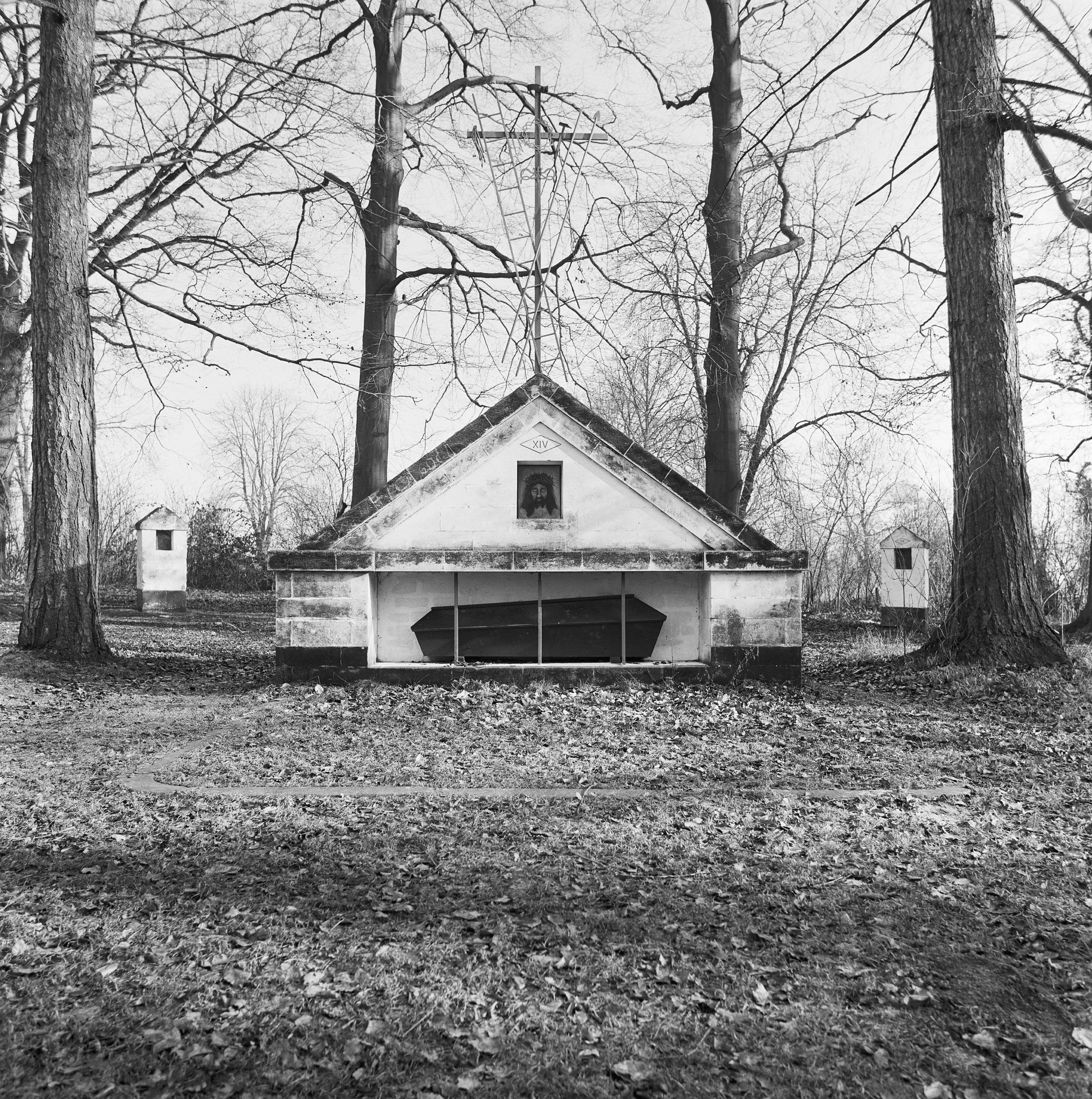
The Stations of the Cross form a circle, surrounding a central shrine

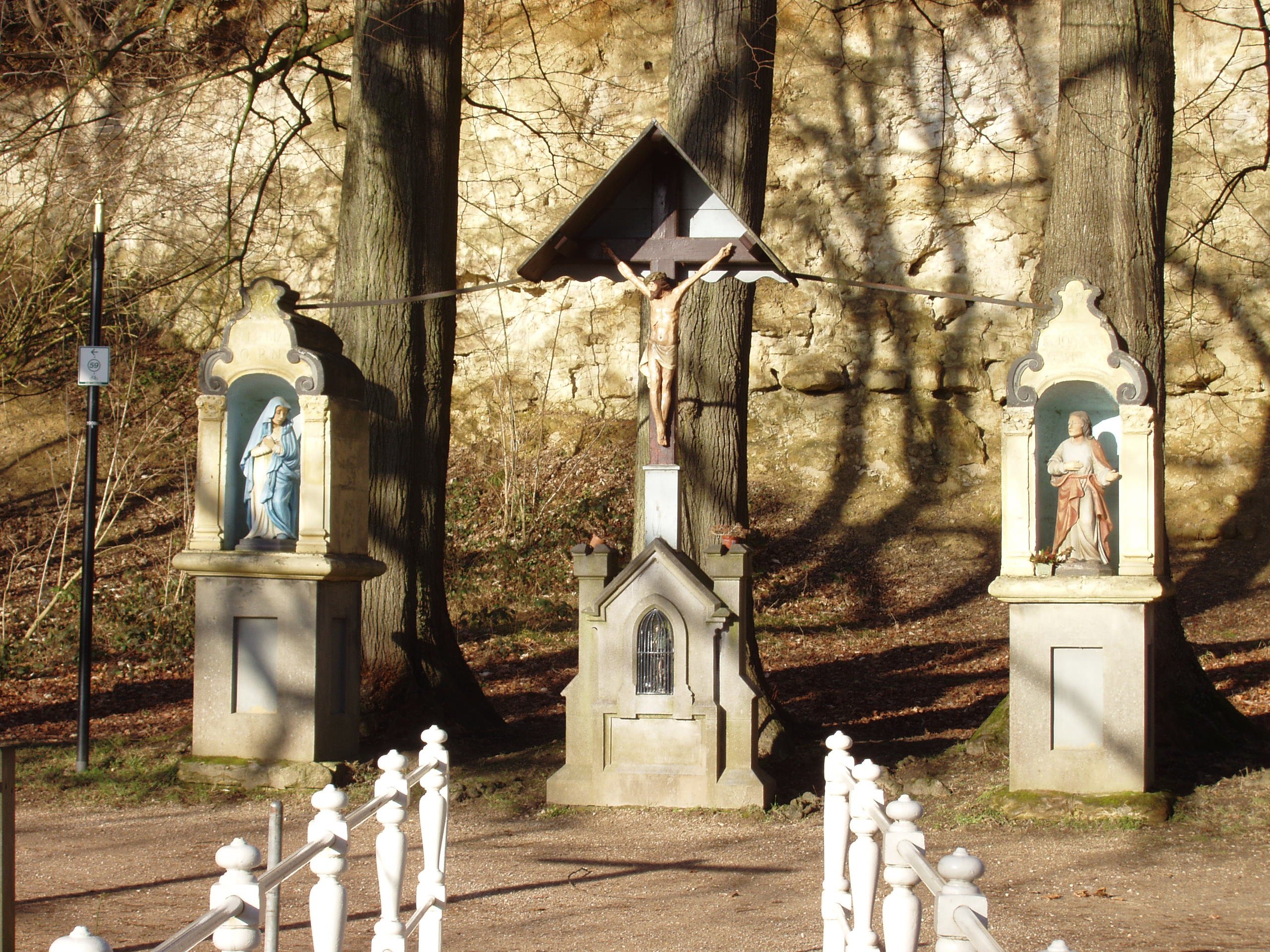
The three statues on the bottom of the Schaesberg hill

The hermitage at Schaelsberg (Dutch: kluis op de Schaelsberg, Limburgish: kloes op de Sjaatsberg) is a monumental hermitage in Schin op Geul, in the municipality of Valkenburg aan de Geul, Netherlands. Built in 1688 for the lords of nearby Schaloen Castle, the chapel and attached living space, housed a succession of 16 hermits from its foundation until 1930. The chapel and nearby Stations of the Cross, added in 1843, are a national monument. Since 1758 a yearly procession, the Sjaasbergergank, is held to the hermitage, and this procession is listed as national intangible cultural heritage. Located in a tourist area of South Limburg, it is a popular tourist attraction.

== Description ==
The hermitage is located on top of the Schaesberg hill, on the edge of the Schaelsbergerforest. It is a rectangular chapel, with a small living space attached, all made out of white painted marl. The chapel has a crow-stepped gable and flèche, with on the north side a choir and apse, and on the south side a nave. Attached is a small living space, consisting of two rooms, with an upper floor and a basement. The lowest of these two rooms dates from the 15th century and was originally a hunting house of Schaloen Castle.

East of the chapel are Stations of the Cross, built in 1843. The stations are presented by 14 marl pedestals, each with a niche containing a lithograph image behind glass, all grouped in a circle surrounding a central shrine, which represents a symbolic grave, with on top the Arma Christi.

On the bottom of the Schaesberg hill, near a bridge across the river Geul to castle Schaloen, there are three small chapels dating from 1739, dedicated to saint Roch. The central chapel has a cross on top with a statue representing Jesus, while the outside chapels each have a statue on top, representing Mary and John the Baptist.

== History ==
The chapel was dedicated to saint Anthony of Padua in 1688 and was part of the saint Mauritius parish in Schin op Geul. From 1688 until 1930 a succession of 16 Franciscan and Carthusian hermits lived in the hermitage.

== Monument ==
The chapel and nearby Stations of the Cross have been a national monument since 14 March 1967. It has a sign stating it is a monument of the province of Limburg. The province of Limburg officially does not have listed buildings, but it gives these signs to national monuments that get provincial financial support. The area is property of Vereniging Natuurmonumenten and maintained by the Sjaasbergergank foundation.

On the last Sunday of June a procession is held, the Sjaasbergergank. This procession is listed as national intangible cultural heritage.

== List of hermits ==
This is a list of all 16 hermits from 1688 until the last hermit died in 1930.

- Lourens Ploemen, 27 April 1688
- Johannes Louens
- Johannes Esken
- Benedictus Martens, 1727
- Arnold Haesen
- Petrus Prickartz, 1764
- Henri de Lidt, 1779
- Petrus Haenen, 1779
- Johannus Jacobs, 2 May 1816
- Johannes Smitsmans, 19 March 1831
- Peter Jozef Dresen, 1874
- Henricus Weerts, 4 October 1860
- Nicolaas Laurent, Juli 1889
- Clemens Salingré, 1 December 1892
- Auguste Tevesen, 2 December 1906
- Broeder Lutgerus
