= Oehl =

River in Belgium

Coordinates: 50°42′17″N 6°05′25″E

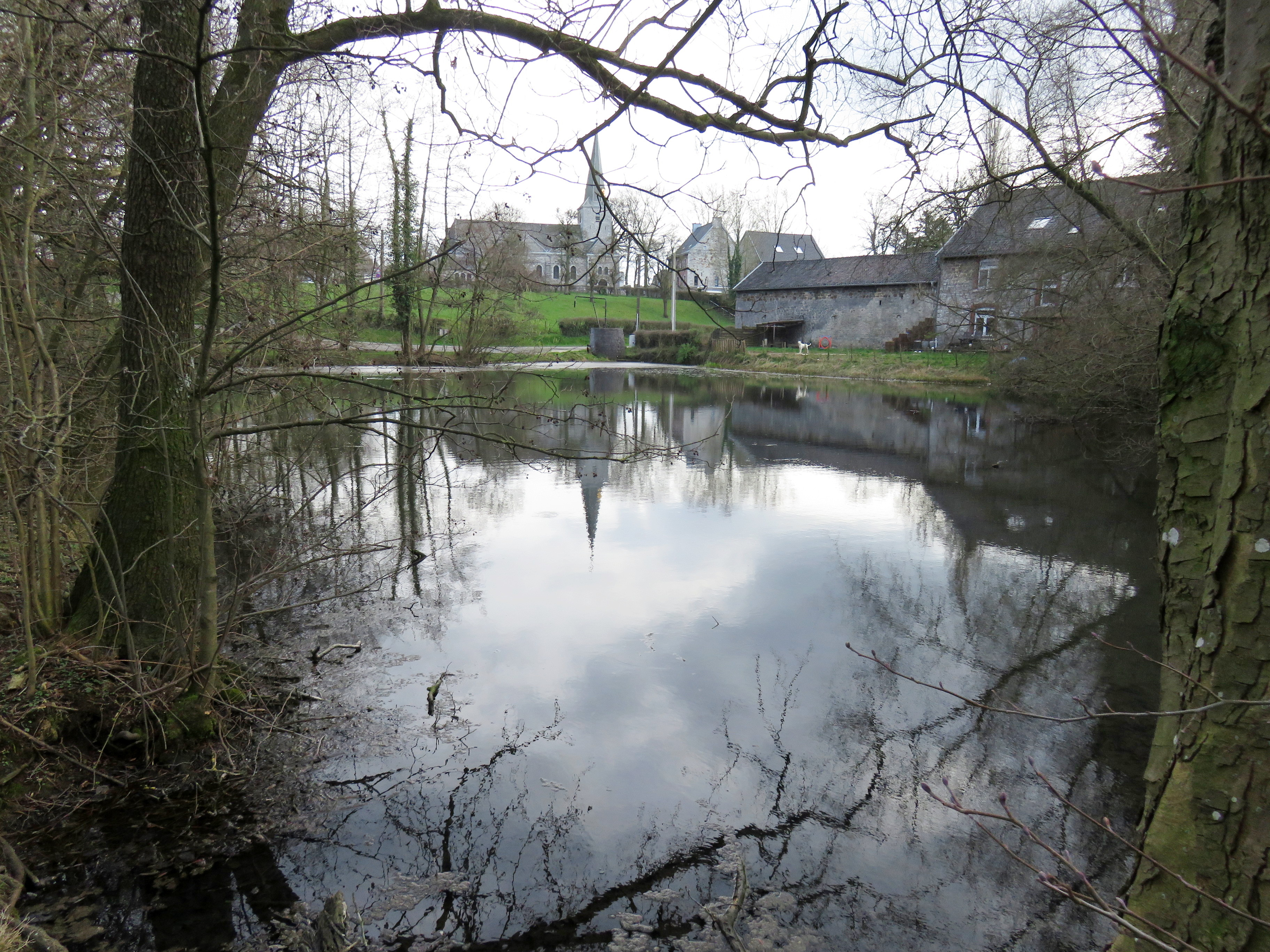
- The pond into which the spring that feeds the Oehl flows

Location
- Country: Belgium

Physical characteristics
- Source: Area of Lichtenbusch
- Mouth: Geul

The Oehl is the first tributary of the Geul river, starting from its source. It flows within the territory of the Belgian municipality of Raeren (part of the Eynatten district). A tributary of the Oehl is the Möschenbergsbach.

== The Geul ==
The Geul river originates from multiple sources located in and near Lichtenbusch, a Belgian town near the Aachener Wald (Aachen Forest) and close to the German border. After these source branches merge, the Geul briefly flows through a forested area, running parallel to the freeway connecting Liège to Aachen (known as A3 in Belgium and BAB44 in Germany) as it crosses the border at Lichtenbusch. It then meanders through meadows for approximately one kilometer, gradually approaching the freeway. Just before reaching Eynattermühle (at the N68 road), the Geul encounters the Oehl, joining it on its left bank.

== The name ==
The Geul river is known as die ''Göhl'' in German, sometimes spelled ''die Goehl''. Interestingly, the name of the first tributary stream closely resembles that of the main stream. This similarity existed in the past as well. Around 1560 the name Gael was used for the Geul, and the side stream was called Nael.

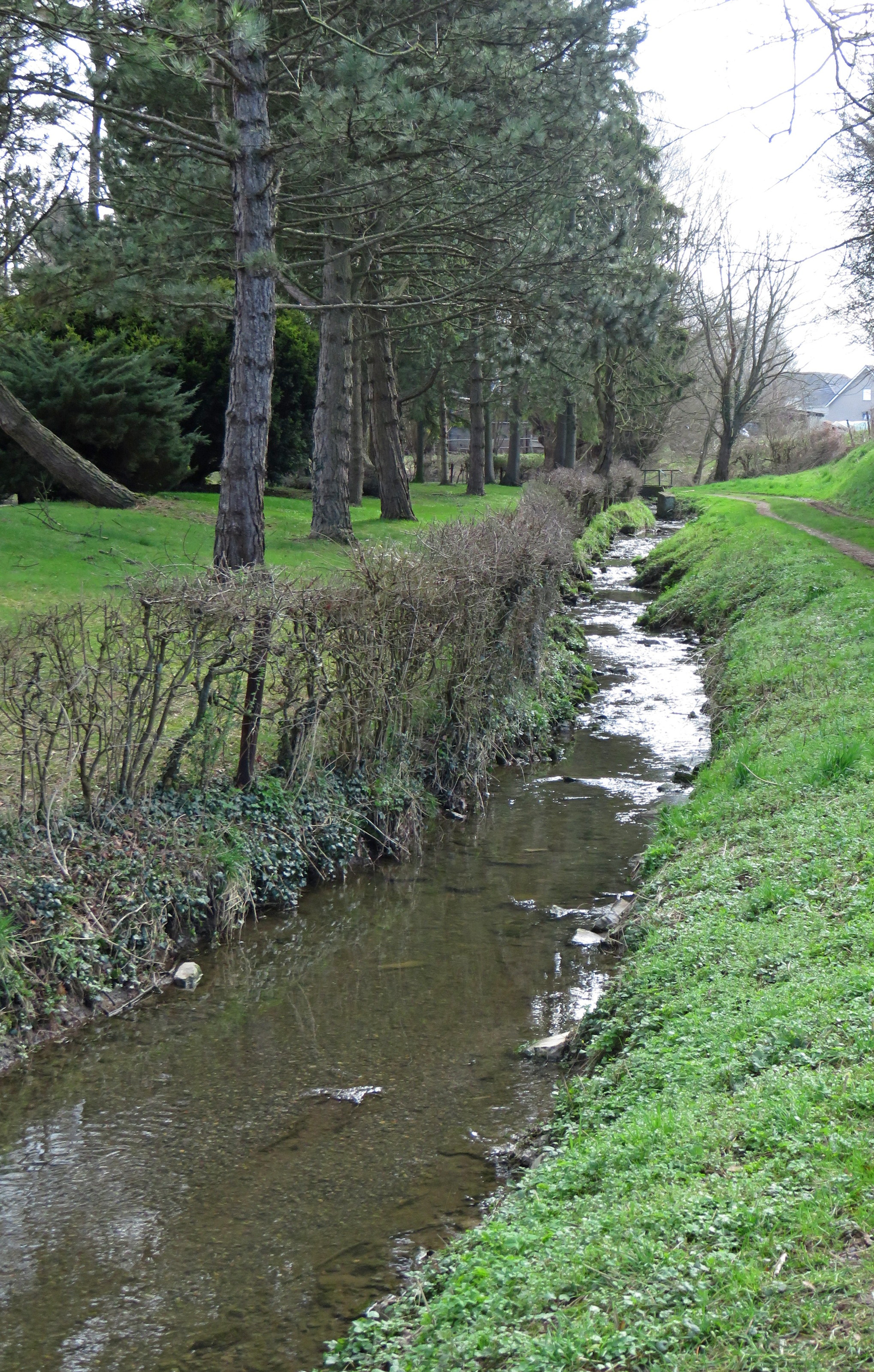
The Oehl behind the Amstenrath moated castle in Eynatten

== Hydrography ==
Regarding the Oehl's hydrography, here are some key points:

- The Oehl originates at an elevation of 275 meters above sea level (m + NAP)
- The Oehl joins the Geul River at an elevation of 255 meters above sea level (m + NAP)
- The drop in elevation is 20 meters
- The Oehl has a length of 1700 meters
- Its gradient is approximately 11.76

In Eynatten, there were two water castles: the Herrenhaus (usually referred to today as Amstenrath Castle) and the Vlattenhaus. The former is still in good condition, while the latter has deteriorated into ruins (and has since been modernized). Between these two castles, there's a powerful spring that contributes to the Oehl's consistent flow.

Further south, closer to the Geul-Roer watershed, groundwater emerges on both sides of the road from Eupen to Eynatten. Depending on precipitation levels, these sources can turn into small streams that supply water to the Oehl for part of the year. The spring in Eynatten, which had an output of about 3 cubic meters per hour around 1975, has satisfied the water needs of the local population for centuries. It featured a pumping system that could be easily activated by anyone needing water. It wasn't until around 1970 that the village was connected to the municipal water supply system. The springwater flows into a pond, which then feeds the Oehl. As it continues, the Oehl receives water from various springs, including one near the Herrenhaus. Just north of the Herrenhaus, the Oehl passes under the N68 road and flows through meadows toward the A3 freeway. About halfway along, another stream joins alongside the Oehl, which is supplied by a strong spring. According to Meerman's research, this stream actually contributes to the Oehl's flow! A bit downstream, the Möschenbergsbach also merges with it. Eventually, the stream goes under the highway and combines with the Geul. The hydrological conditions in the latter part of the Oehl valley have significantly changed due to the construction of the highway.

=== Regarding the Möschenbergsbach ===
- Originates at an elevation of 277 meters above sea level.
- Joins the Oehl at an elevation of 257 meters above sea level.
- Total drop in elevation: 20 meters.
- Length: 1650 meters.
- Gradient: 12.12

The Möschenbergbach doesn't have a clearly defined starting point either; it features numerous groundwater discharge points. The stream takes a distinct form southeast of Eynatten and then flows towards the Möschenberg hamlet. To the north of Möschenberg, the creek meanders through marshy meadows, eventually transforming into a marshy area where it merges with the Oehl.

== See also ==
- Gulp (river)
- Geul
- List of rivers of Belgium
- Rur (river)
