= Schaloen Castle =

Coordinates: 50°51′25″N 5°51′03″E

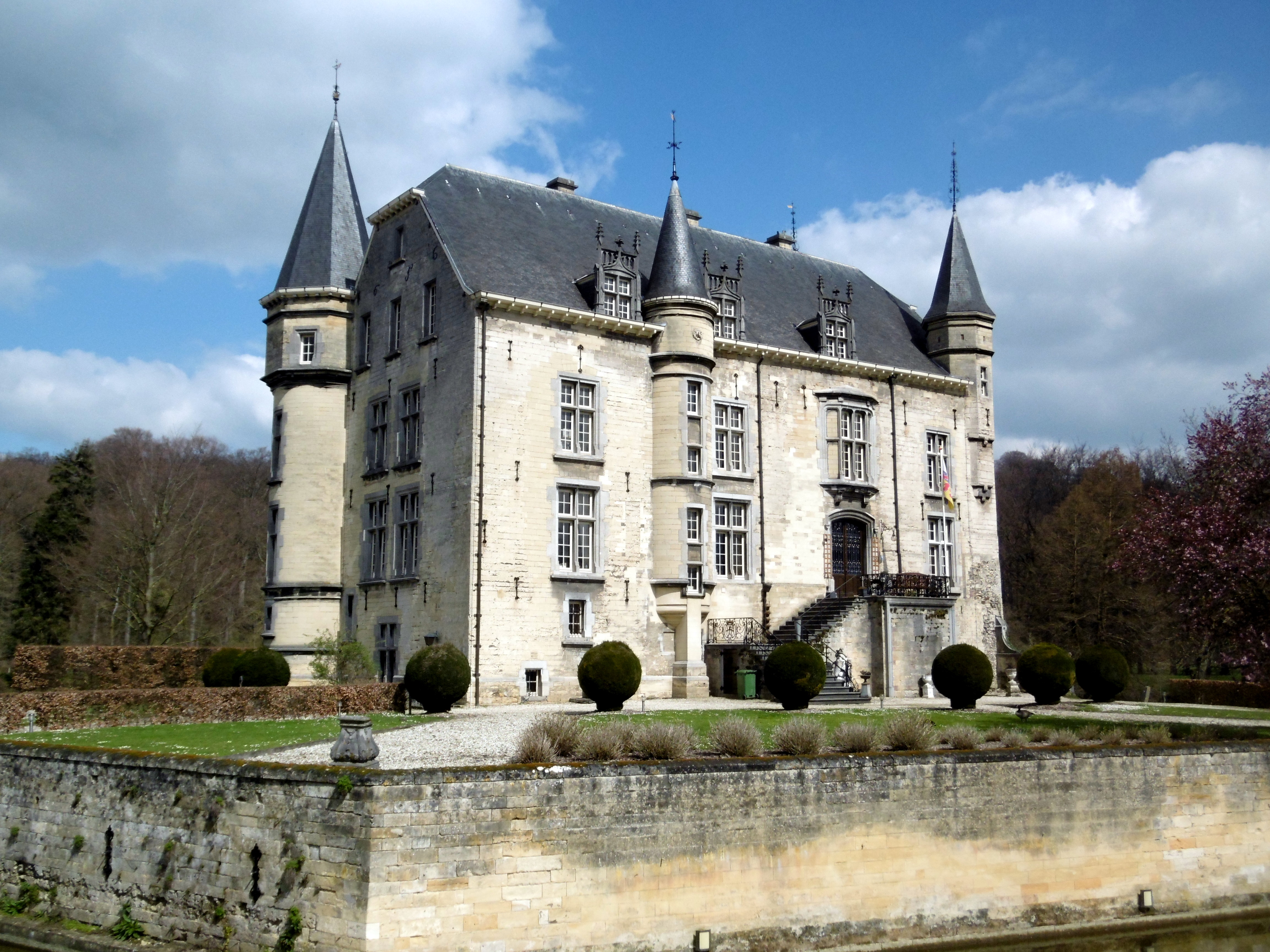
Schaloen Castle

Schaloen Castle (Dutch: Kasteel Schaloen) is a castle in Oud-Valkenburg in the South Limburg municipality of Valkenburg aan de Geul in The Netherlands. The castle is a national monument. Together with the Johannes de Doperkerk and Genhoes, it is part of the protected face of Oud Valkenburg. It is also part of the Buitengoed Geul & Maas.

== Location ==
The castle is located in the meadow of the river Geul near the village of Oud-Valkenburg. The canal around the house is fed with water from the Molenbeek, a Geul branch that formed the main branch of the Geul in the 16th century. The castle is located north of the Oud-Valkenburgerweg, the through road from Valkenburg to Schin op Geul.

At the end of a driveway, one arrives at a watermill and then, through a gatehouse, on a square where the castle and forecourt are located. The marlstone Schaloensmolen from 1699 was originally a ban mill, but nowadays only serves as a demonstration mill. In the castle garden, the local IVN association has created a Limburg botanical garden, which is open to the public.

== Building history ==
The rectangular castle is built of marl and originally dates from the 12th century. Then it was a bit smaller. It was expanded in the following century, but almost completely burned down in 1575. On the map Jacob van Deventer in 1550, the castle with attribution Sloenes clearly visible in its current form. In the middle is a residential tower with an extension as an entrance. A wing has been added on both sides. The arkel turrets date from the 16th century. There is a wide canal around it.

Johan Reinier Hoen van Cartils restored the castle in 1656, after years of vacancy. An inscription in Latin says that after the fire in 1575, the couple Hoen van Cartils and Johanna Maria van der Merwijck saved and restored the building. The state in 1656 is also a rectangular building with 4 storeys under a gable roof and a vaulted cellar. The different types of marl show that materials have been reused in the various restorations. Restorations followed in 1721 and 1738. In 1721 a tithe barn is also built, which now functions as a hotel.

After the French occupation in 1814, the castle became the property of the De Villers Masbourg d'Eclaye family. In 1894 they had the castle thoroughly restored by architect Pierre Cuypers in a neo-Gothic style and the castle got its current appearance with an attached west tower and stair tower at the front and raised arkel turrets. The facades were given a new, more regular layout, the front facade was given a bay window and the rear facade a balcony. The interior was also renewed.

After the billeting of American soldiers at the end of the Second World War (1946), the house was completely destroyed inside. After restoration in 1956, the main building was again suitable for habitation.

The outer bailey, on the west side, is said to be from the Middle Ages, given its oval shape. It is made of brick with layers of marl. Fire walls have stepped gables. The entrances have round arch gates. Above one of these is an arch decoration and inscription. Wall anchors depict the year 1701 on the façade. These probably indicate the restoration by Gerard Ernst Hoen van Cartils. In the second half of the 20th century, a café with a tea garden was established in part. There have been hotel apartments in the castle since 1986.

The gatehouse, renovated in 1718, is located behind a bridge over the canal. It is also built in marl and has a hipped roof. Above the round gate is a triangular tympanum. There is a tower-shaped ridge on the roof. In 1987 the building was converted into a caretaker's house. Today it has a catering function.

== Occupant History ==
The oldest records of the existence of Schaloen Castle date from 1381. At the end of the 14th century it had two owners: knight Jan van Hulsberg, sheriff of the alderman 's bank of Klimmen and Geraerdt Mulaerdt. Later the former shares the castle with Gerard van der Linden. After 1397, Reinier II van Hulsberg owned the entire castle. In 1442 and 1457 the castle was owned by his son Reinier IV van Hulsberg van Schaloen called Sjaloen, according to the archives in Maastricht and Tongeren. His son Librecht van Hulsberg was his successor and after his death in 1530 his brother Johan van Hulsberg was well served. His son Reinier V van Hulsberg van Schaloen became the next lord of the castle. This was succeeded by his brother Gerard van Hulsberg, who acquired the rights to the manor of Oud-Valkenburg in 1605 . The family lived at Huys de Dohm in Welten. During the Spanish-Dutch war in the sixteenth century, the castle was almost completely destroyed by fire, but it could be rebuilt in 1656.

After Gerard's death, Johan Reinier Hoen van Cartils became owner by inheritance. He was also the owner of Cartils Castle and in 1644 bought the Schin op Geul manor from the Spanish king. Around 1665 his son Gerard Ernest Hoen van Cartils succeeded him. He had a number of buildings built, including a water mill and a safe on the Schaelsberg. He was married to Anna Agnes van Renesse van Elderen. She brought the title of count into the family. The Calvary group, popularly called the Three Statues, at the foot of the Schaasberg aan de Geul, was also founded by the lord of Schaloen in 1739.

Maximilian Hendrik de Hoen Cartils had no children and his nephew, Count Maximilian Hendrik Laurens Hoen de Cartils inherited the estate in 1782. He married Felicitas of Hohenzollern, a princess of Hohenzollern-Hechingen. They did not live on Schaloen. The count bought the ruins of Valkenburg Castle, which remained in the family until 1919. The Hoen-Hohenzollern couple had three daughters. The eldest daughter married Ladislas de Villers Masbourg d'Eclaye. They inherited Schaloen. After the French occupation, the castle became the property of the De Villers Masbourg d'Eclaye family (1814). This family remained the owner of Schaloen until the late 1960s in the 20th century, although they lived in Brussels since 1934 . In 1968 the municipality becameValkenburg-Houthem the new owner.

The second daughter, Philipine, married Count de Hamal. They inherited Geulle Castle and lived in it until 1842. In that year Count de Hamal sold Geulle Castle to the Belgian Count Emile d'Oultremont.

The municipality of Valkenburg-Houthem sold the castle in 1977 to contractor Woudenberg. He restored a part with the help of grants. In 1986 the Bot family (contractor) bought the property and moved to the main building. Bot started, among other things, with the exploitation of the outer bailey as hotel apartments. All buildings were restored in the years that followed.

Today the castle no longer has the function it used to have, but the stables and outbuildings are now used as a hotel. The castle itself cannot be visited. In 2013 the castle is for sale, the most expensive house for sale in the Netherlands.

== Lords of Schaloen in Maastricht ==
The lords of Schaloen, like many noble families, owned a refugee house in a nearby town, in this case in the Bredestraat in Maastricht. Some members of the Van Hulsberg family were mayors of Maastricht in the 16th century (from both Liège and Brabant side ).

== Pictures ==
=== Castle ===
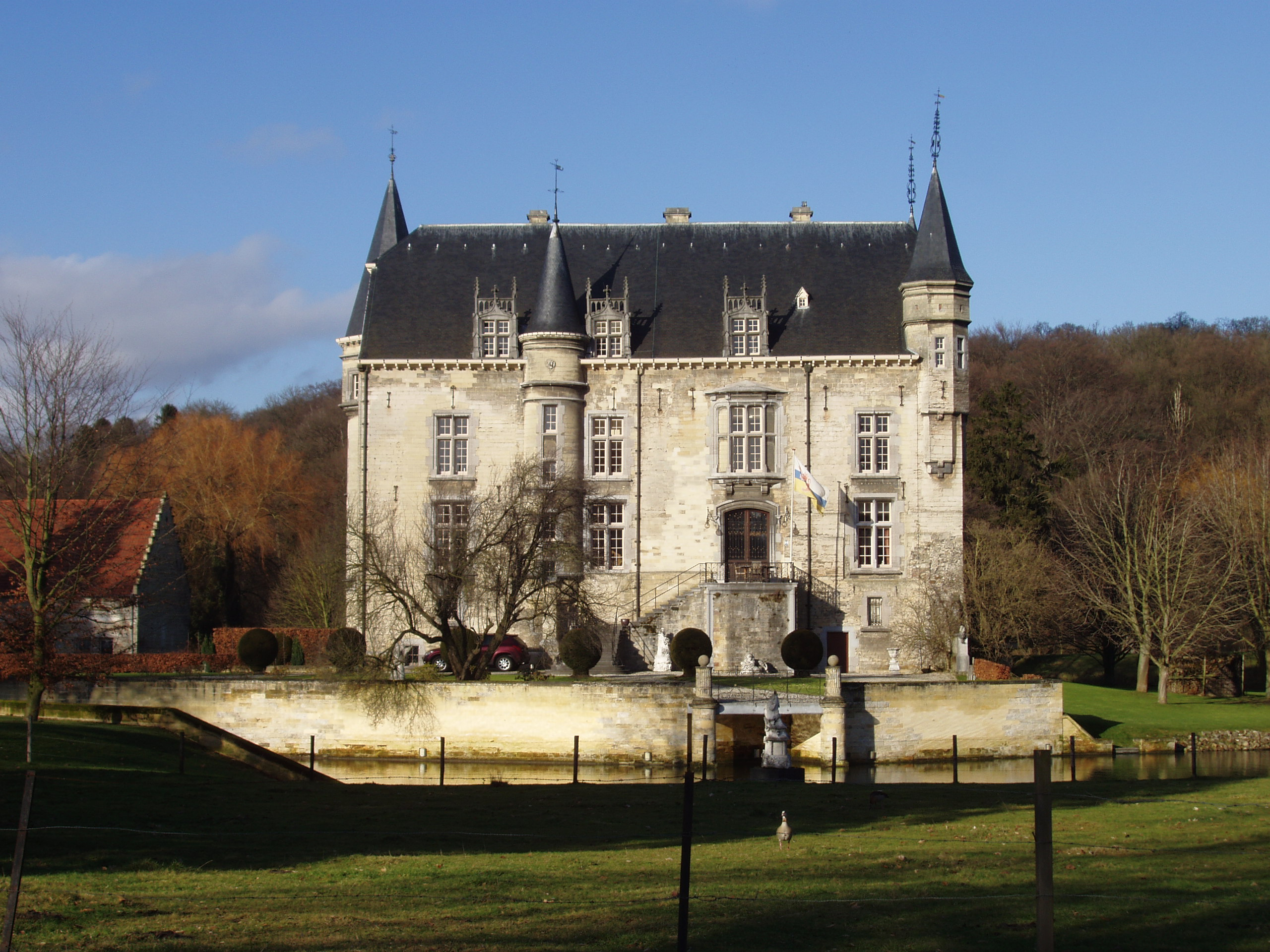
Westgevel

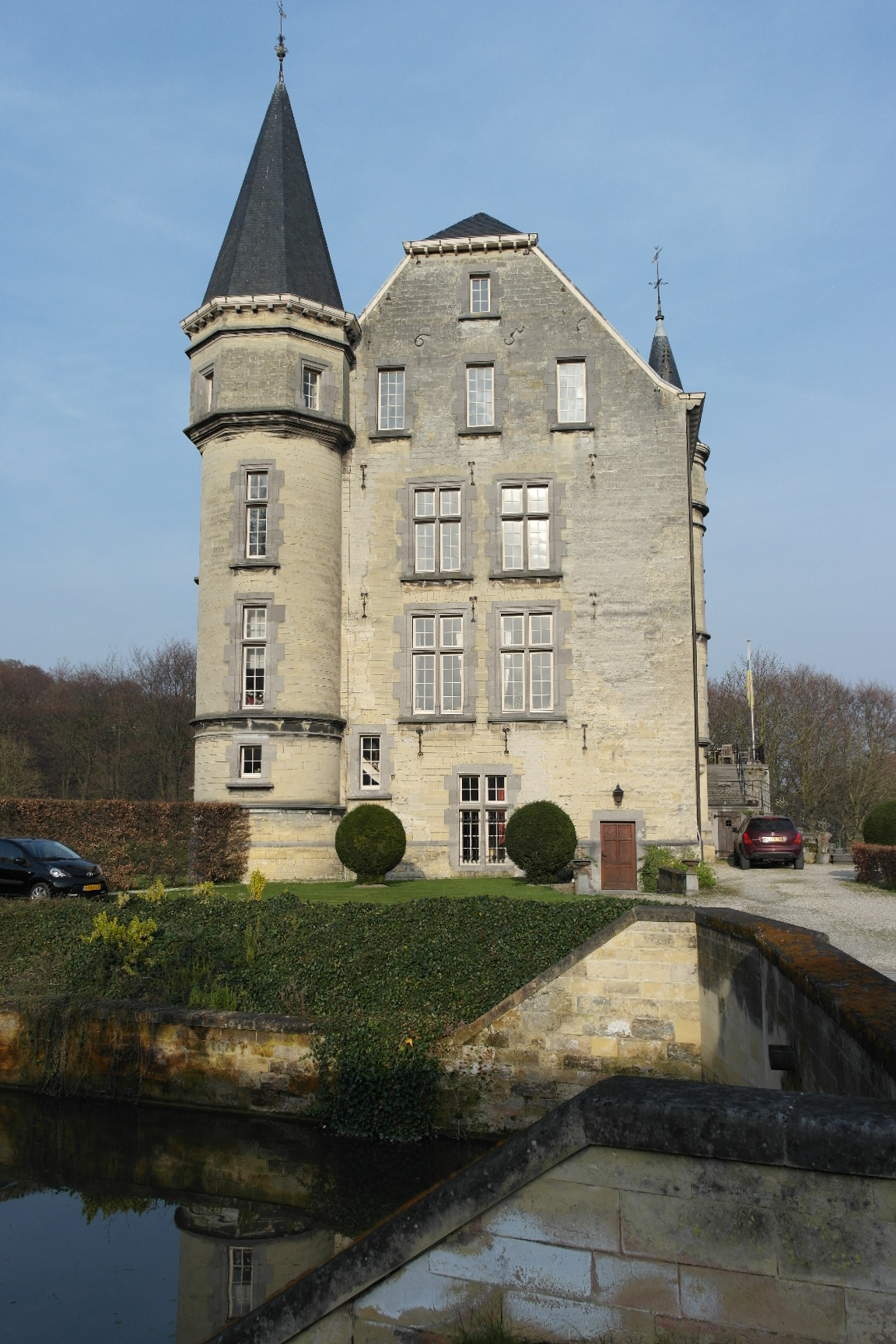
Zuidgevel

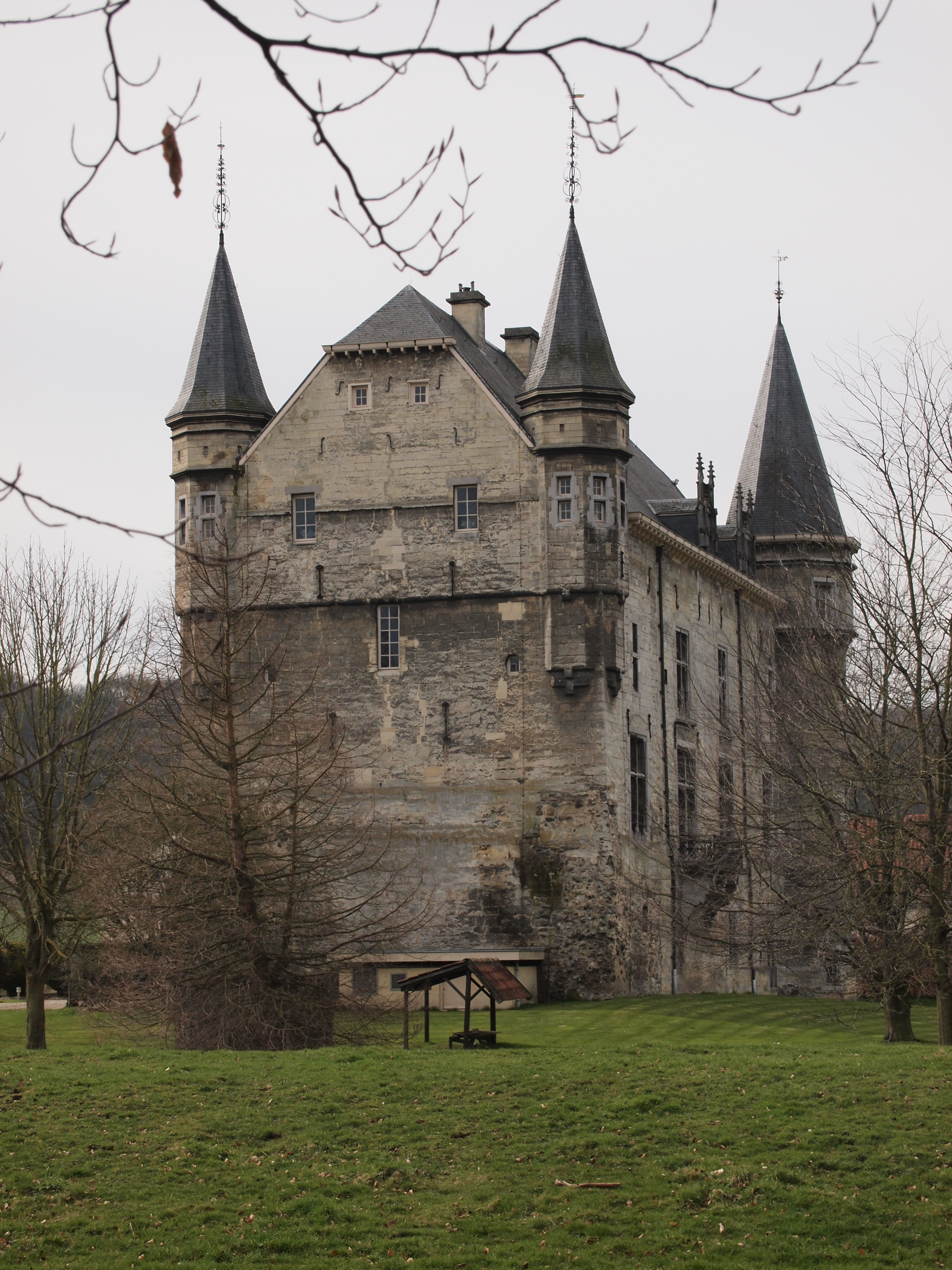
Noordgevel

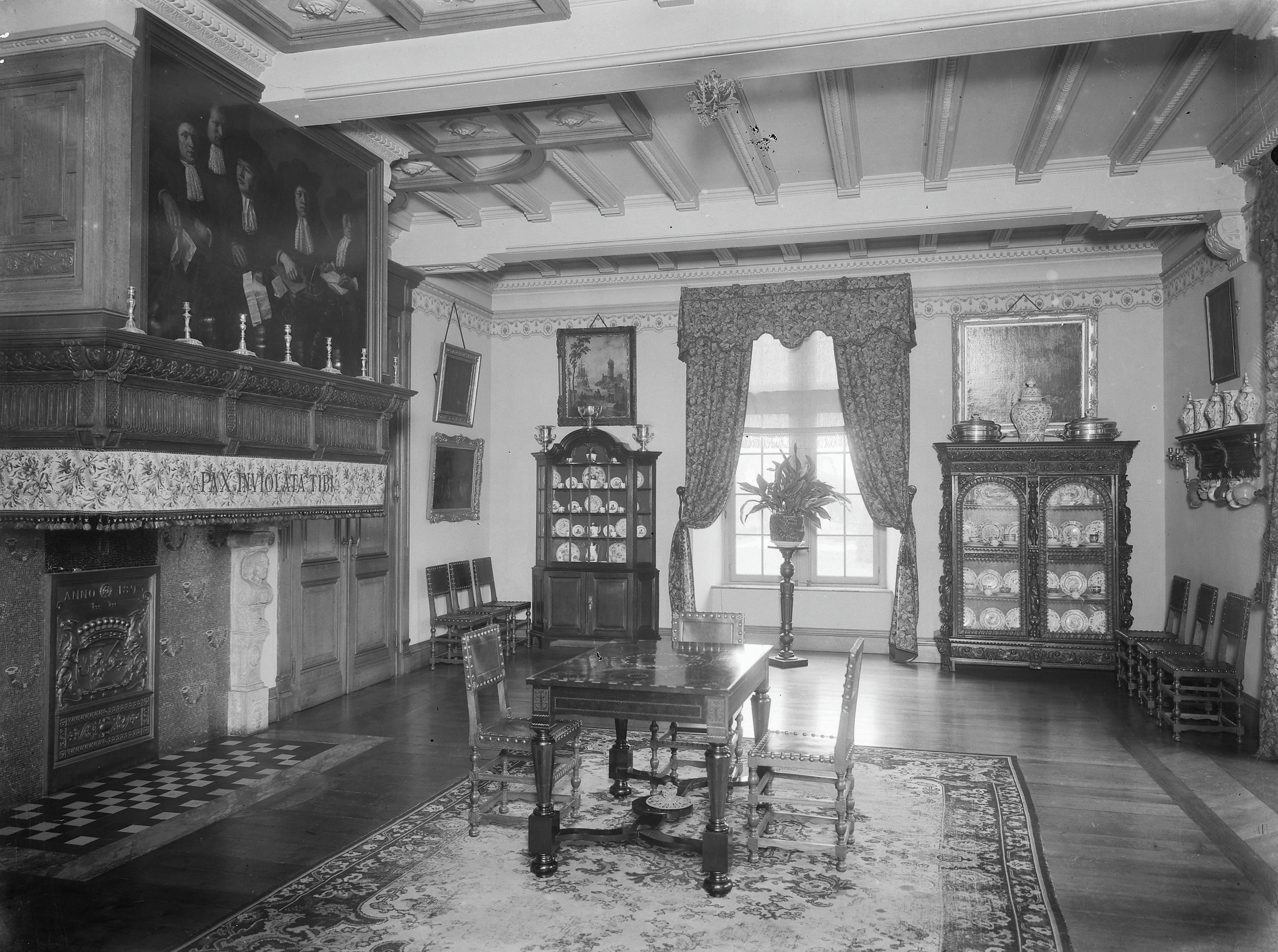
Interieur begin 20e eeuw

=== Outbuildings ===
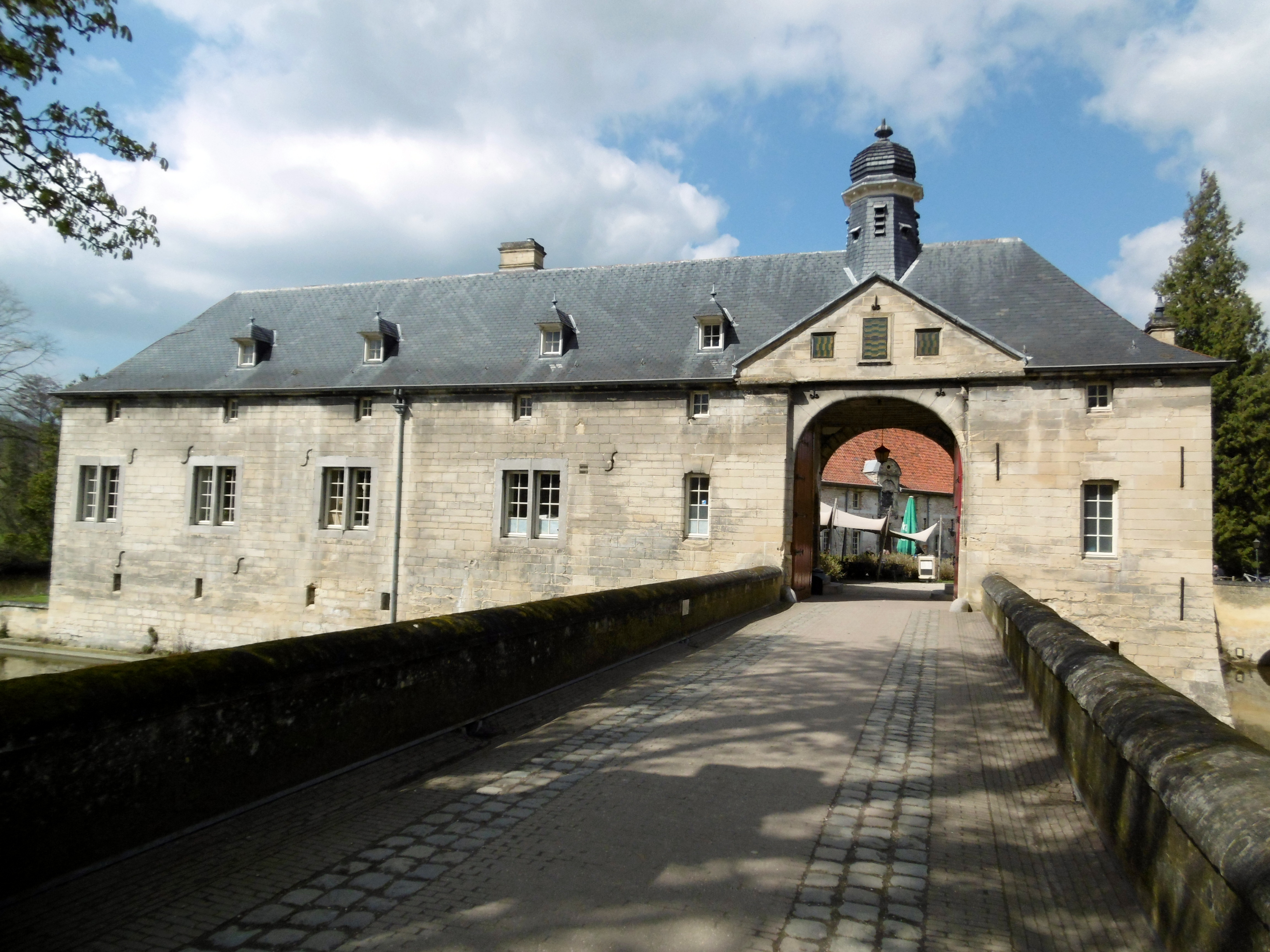
Poortgebouw

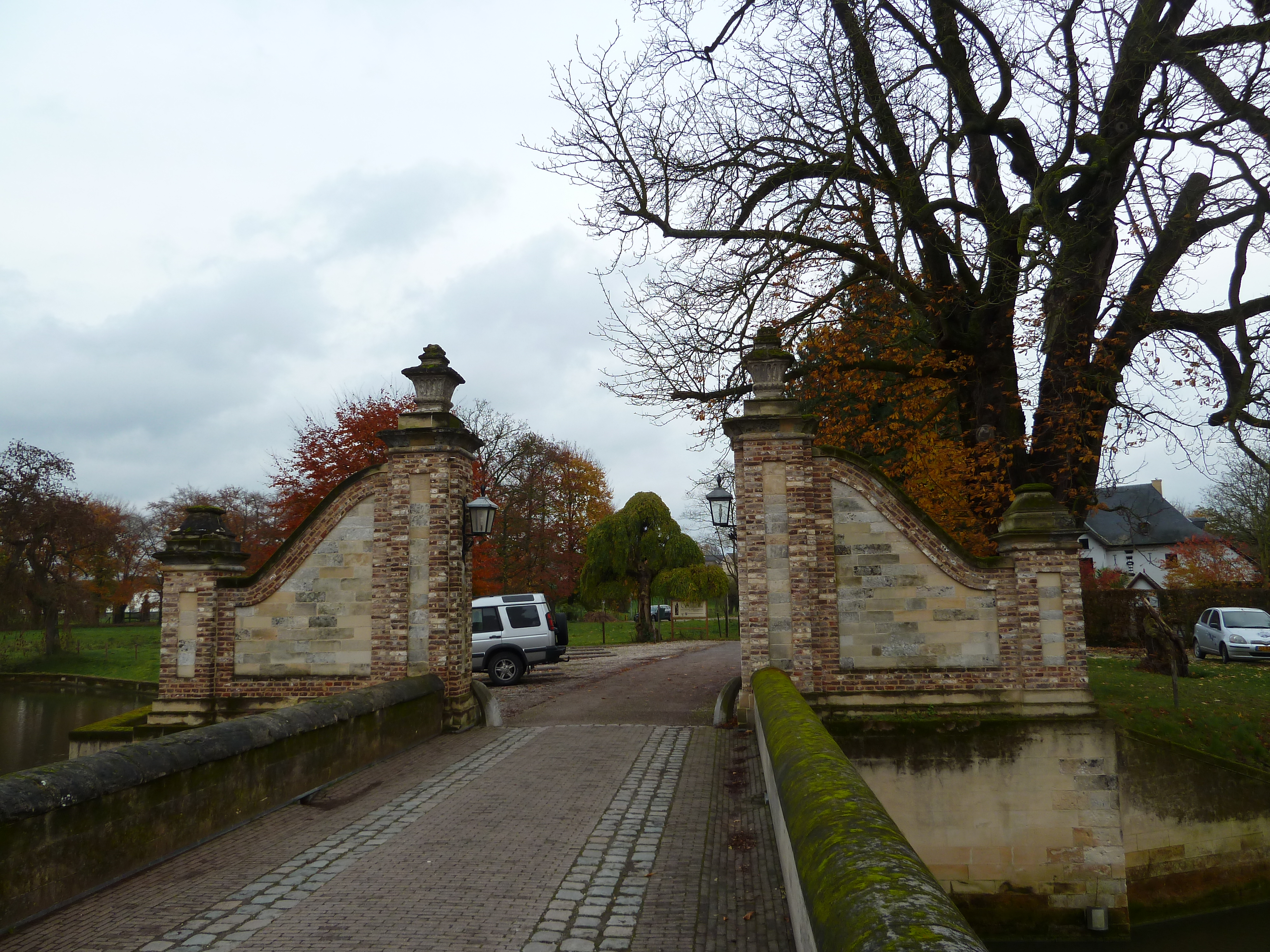
Pijlers

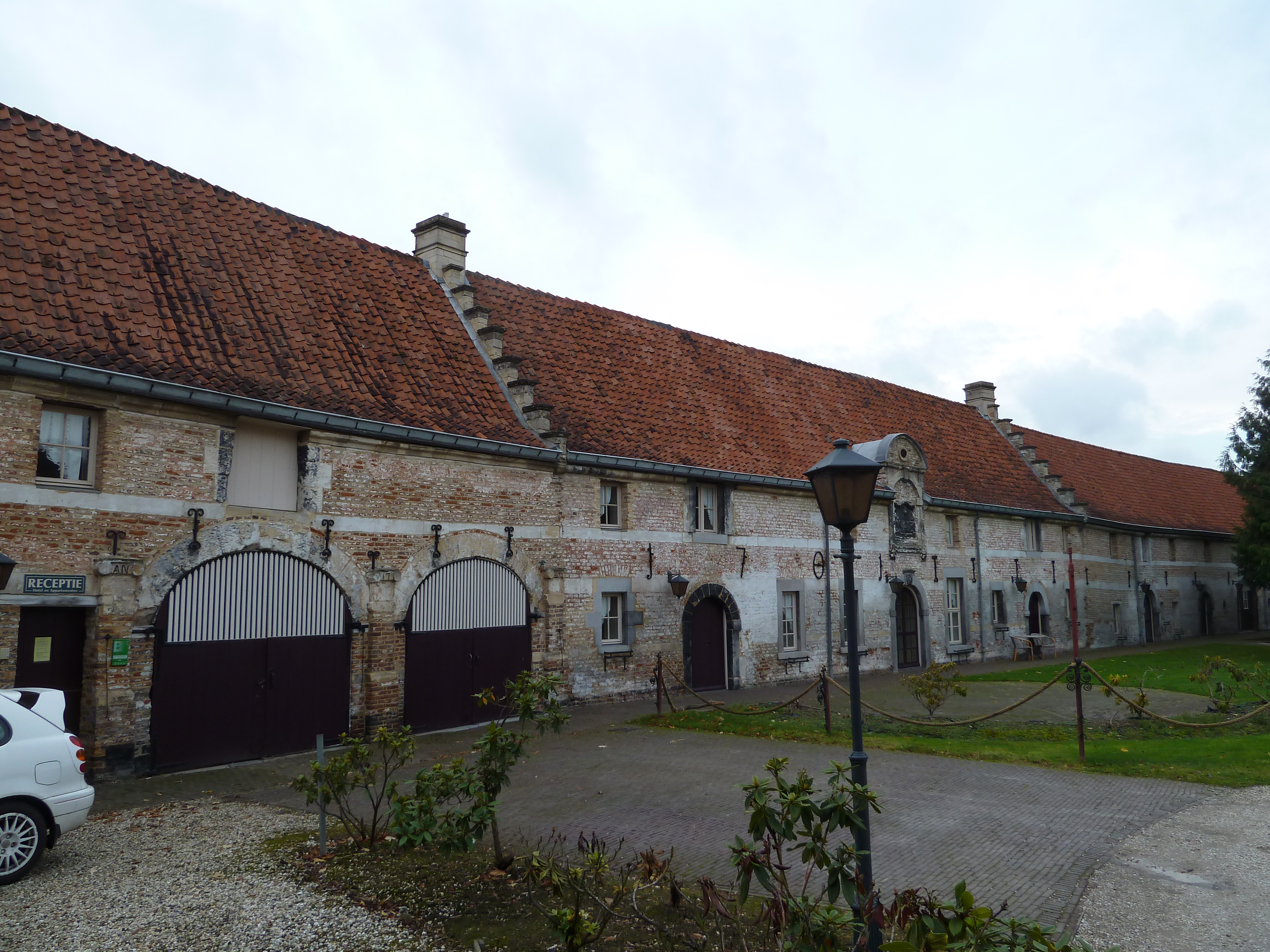
Bijgebouwen

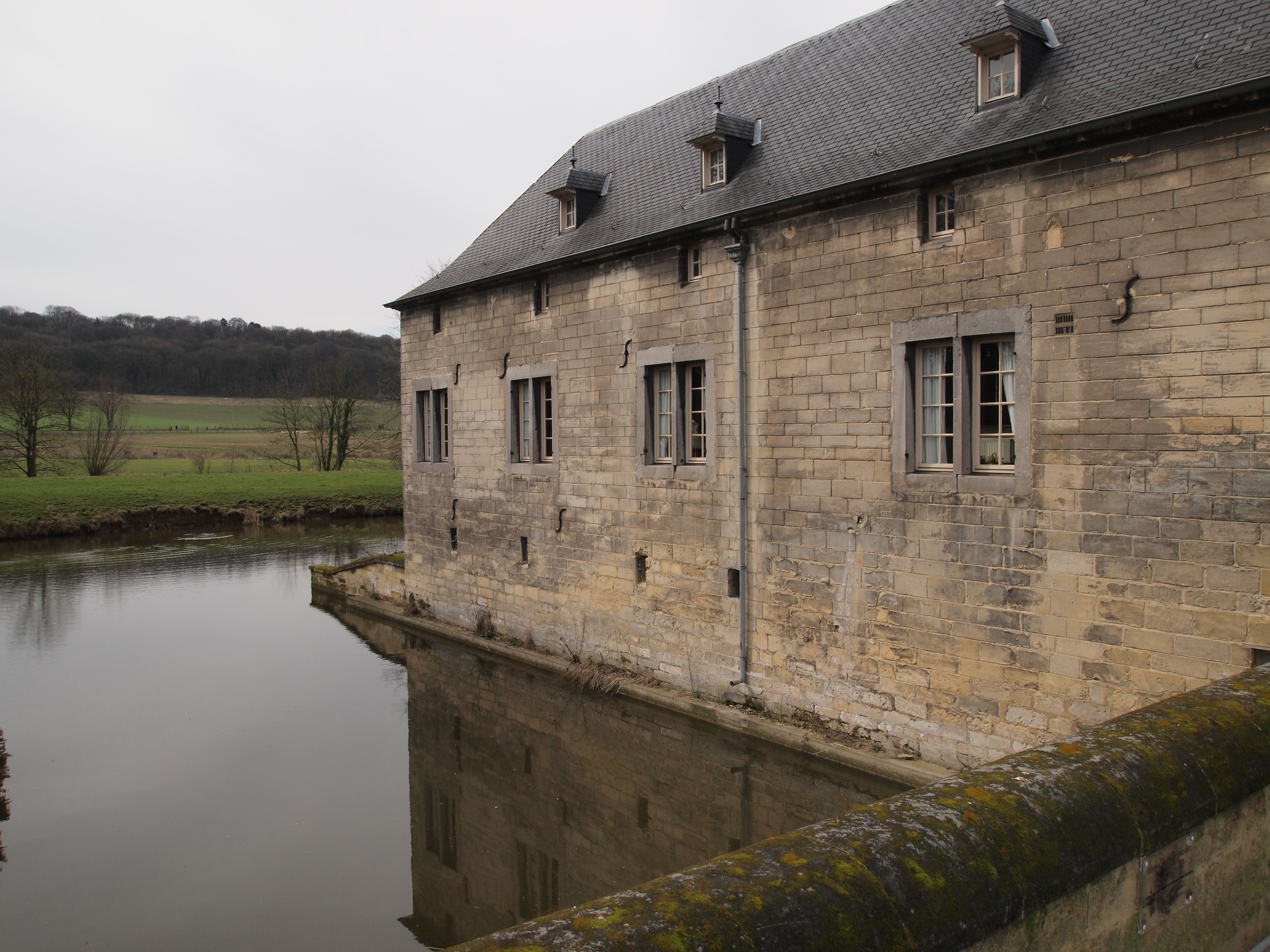
Detail kasteelhoeve

=== Garden and lands ===
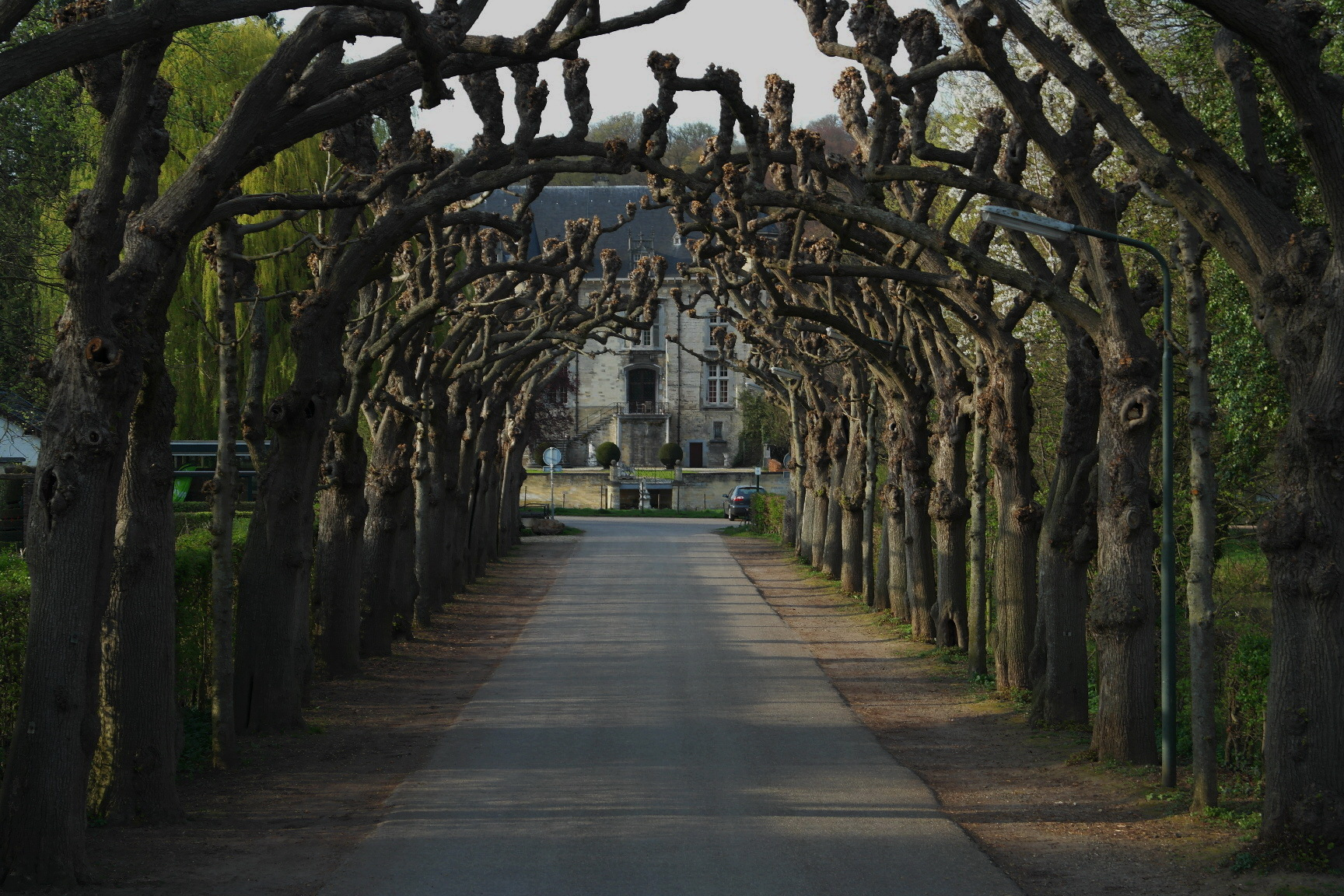

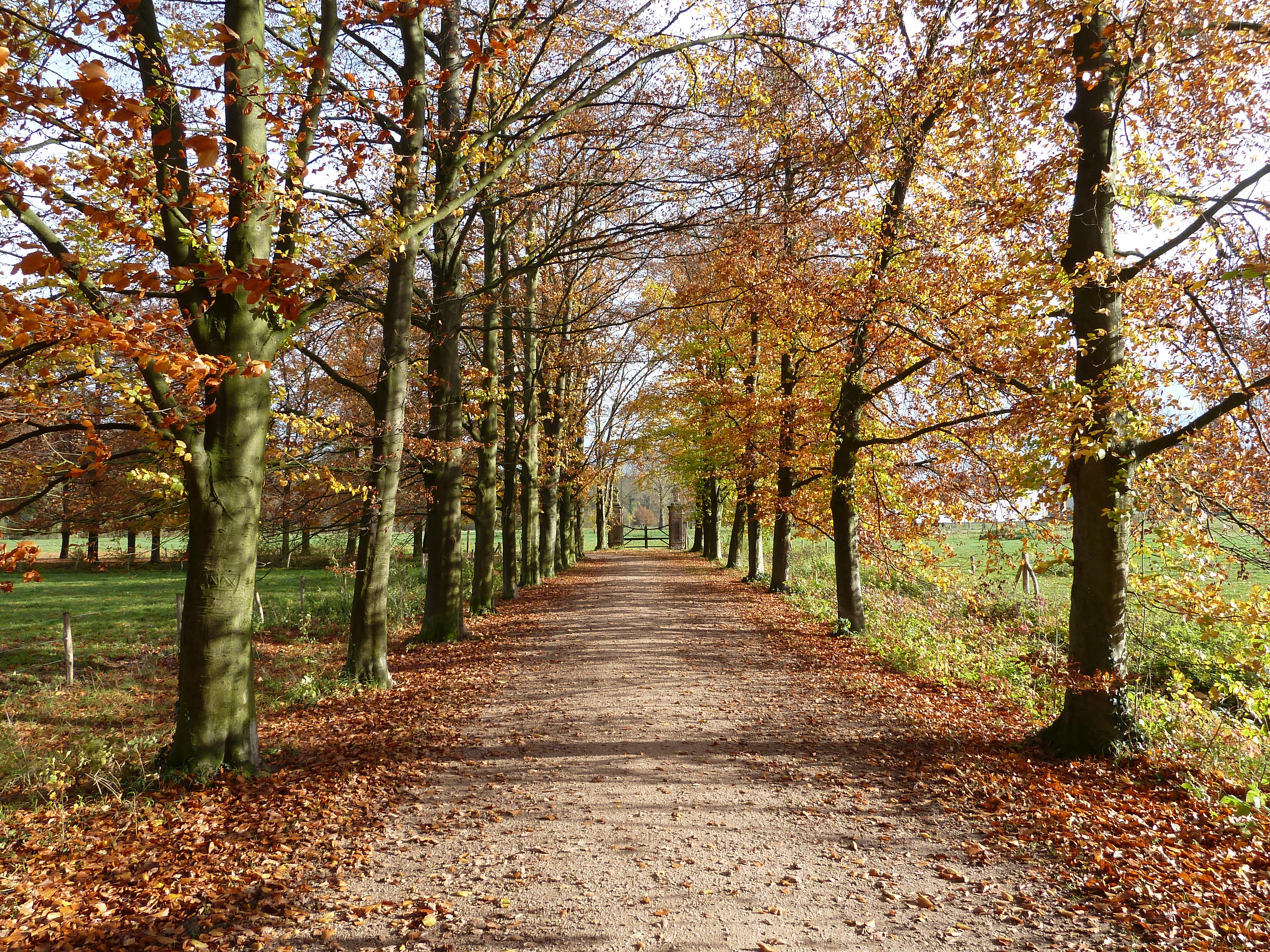
Bomenlaan zuidzijde

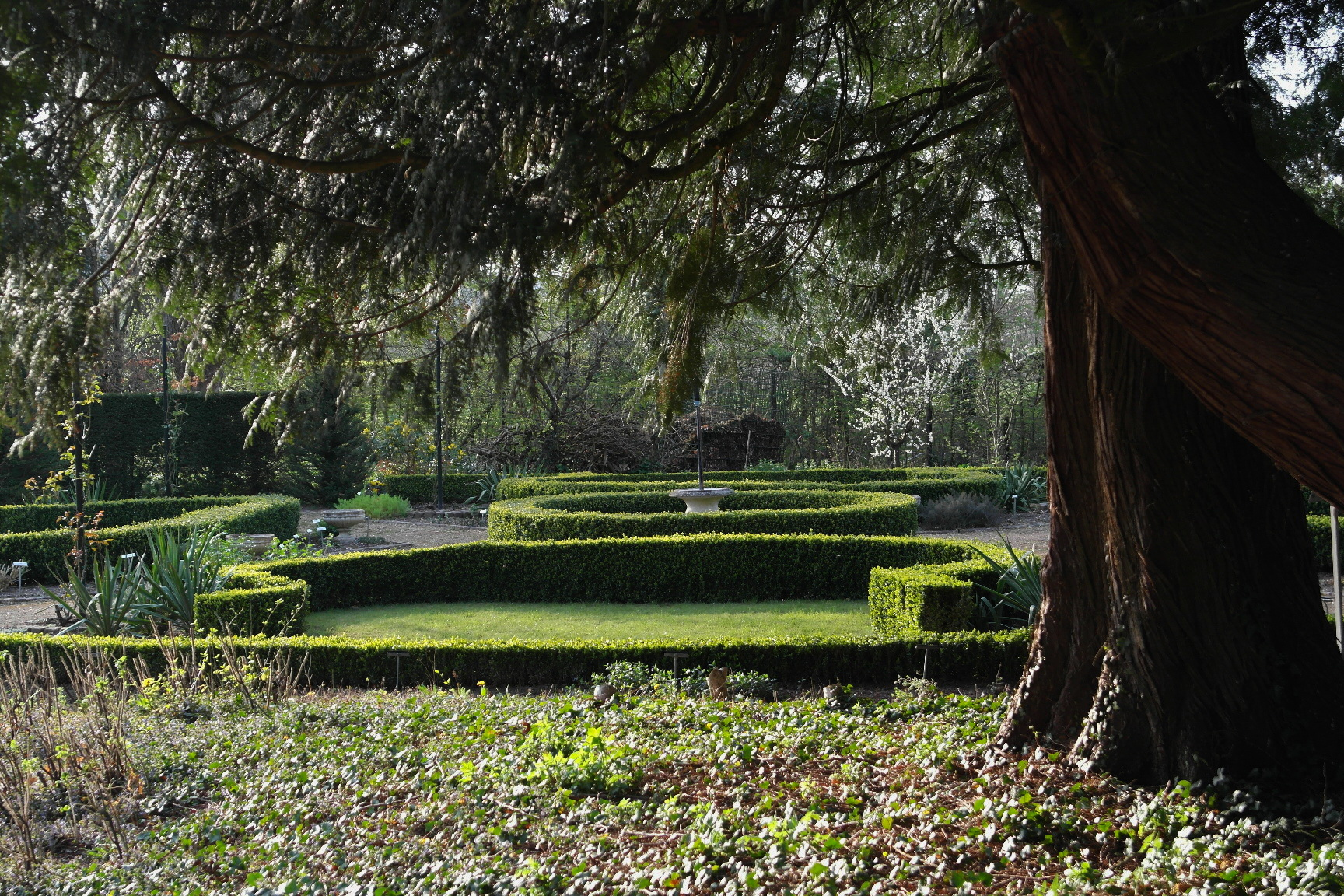
Formele tuin

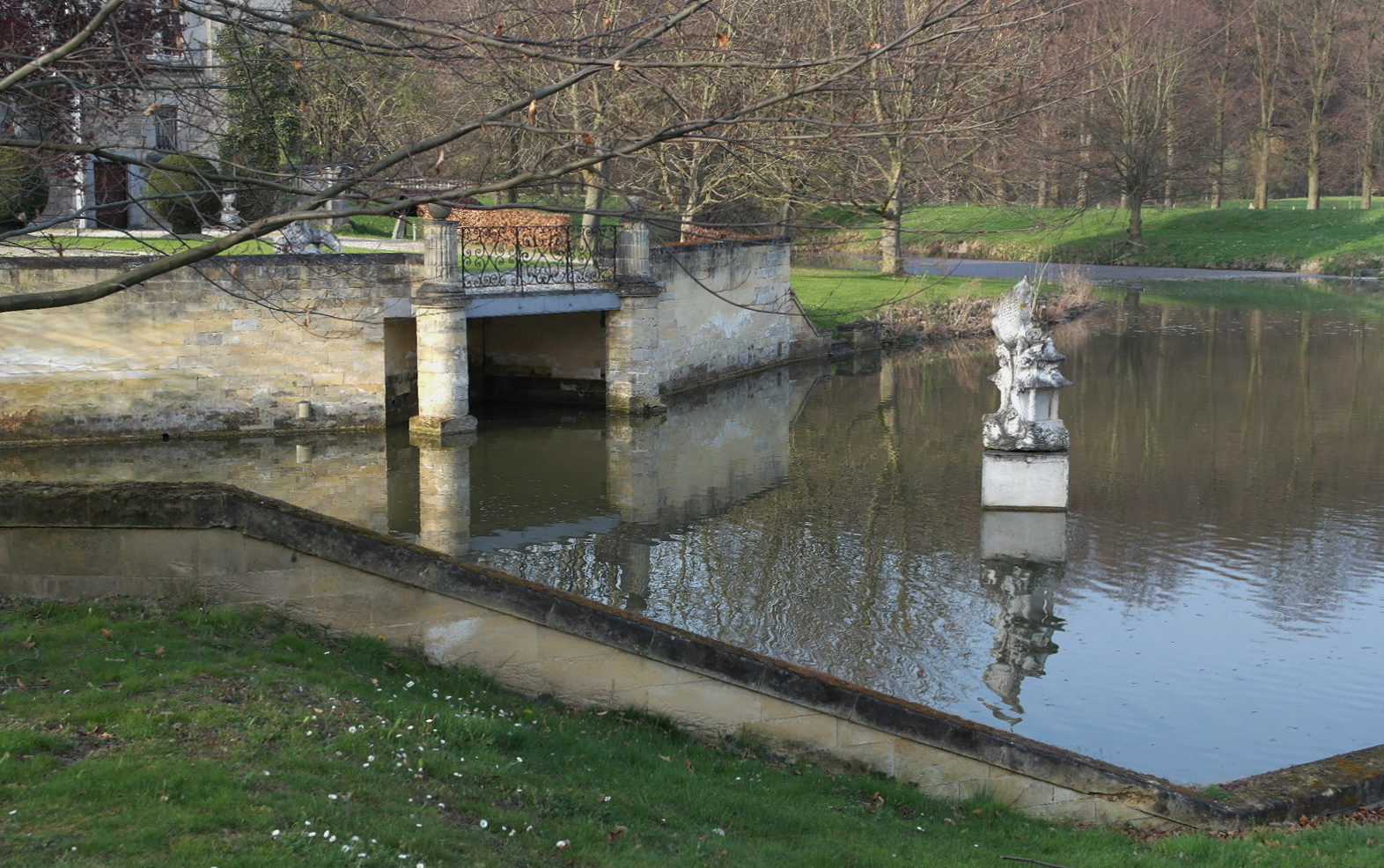
Kasteelgracht en tuin
