= Zeeschelde =

River in Belgium

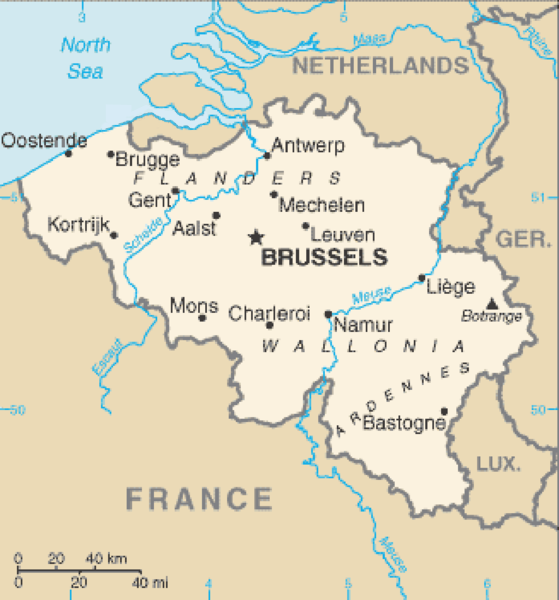

Location
- Country: Netherlands

Physical characteristics
- Source: Scheldt River
- Mouth: Antwerp

The Zeeschelde is a part of the Scheldt River, and is of great ecological importance. It is home to numerous water birds and the river is considered a nursery for marine fish. Many young fish use the Zeeschelde as a resting place, only to swim back out to sea a few months later. Sections of the river are under European protection as part of Natura 2000 "Scheldt and Durme estuary from the Dutch border to Ghent" (BE2300006).

== Location ==
The Zeeschelde is the section of the Scheldt River that flows from the lock in Gentbrugge to the Belgian-Dutch border, where it merges with the Western Scheldt, thus forming the Scheldt estuary. Furthermore, the Zeeschelde can be divided into the Upper and Lower Zeeschelde regions. The specific boundary between these two regions varies depending on the source. Some define the most upstream boundary of the Lower Zeeschelde in Schelle, where the Rupel River meets the Scheldt, while others place this boundary in Antwerp. In either case, it extends to the Dutch border, marking the beginning of the Western Scheldt.

== Name origin ==
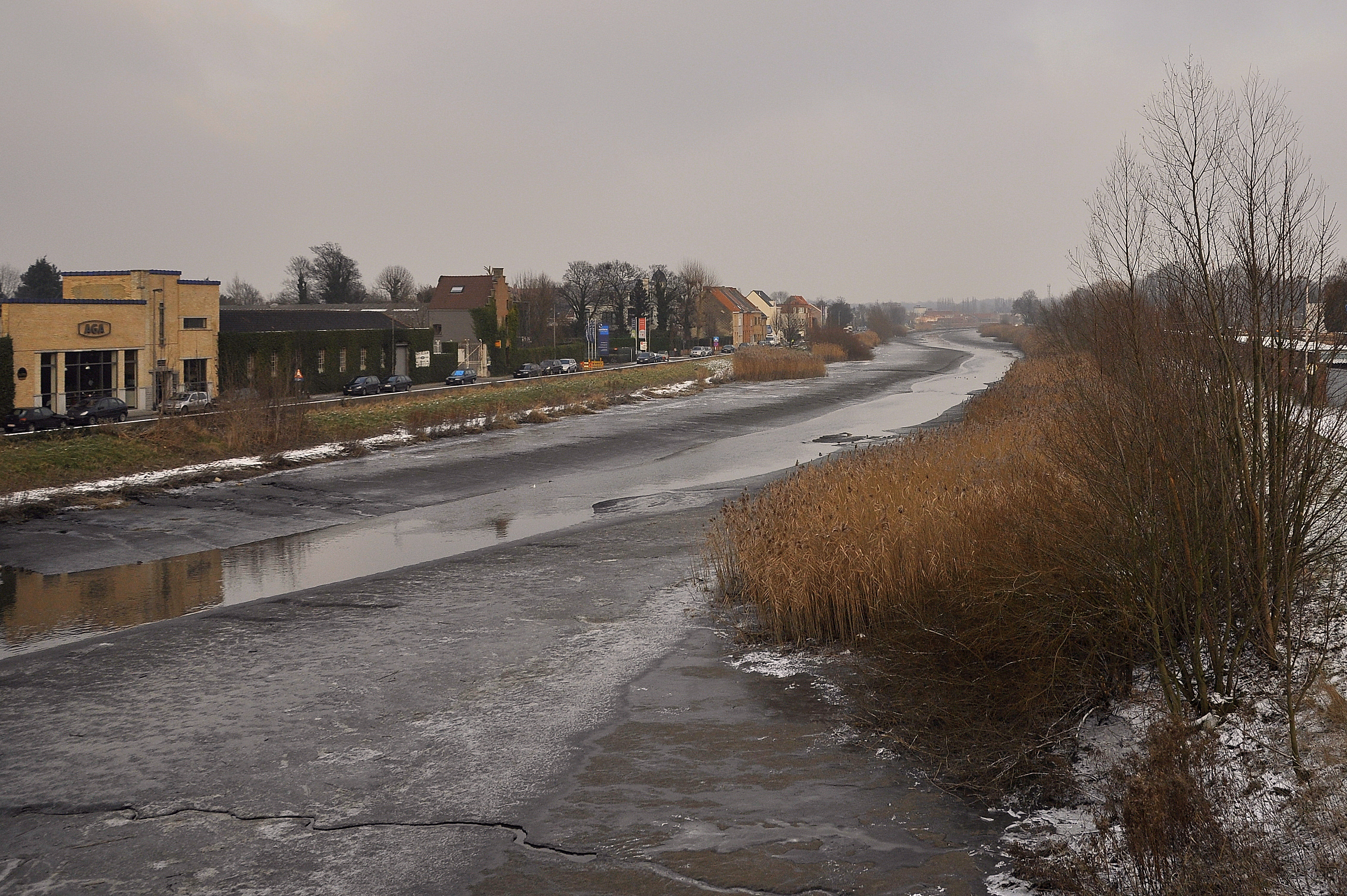
The Zeeschelde from the bridge in Gentbrugge (eastward)

The Zeeschelde derives its name from its susceptibility to the tides of the North Sea, causing a tidal wave to flow into the river twice a day. Simultaneously, the river must discharge a substantial volume of water from upstream into the sea. A combination of spring tides, a northwest storm, and heavy rainfall can result in elevated water levels. An exceptionally robust tidal wave surges into the Scheldt, obstructing the efficient drainage of rainwater and exerting pressure on the dikes. Additionally, the inland basin of the Sea Scheldt progressively narrows, heightening the risk of dangerously high water levels. To mitigate the risk of flooding, Waterways and Maritime Canal (in Dutch: Waterwegen en Zeekanaal or W&Z), and since 2018 the successor De Vlaamse Waterweg nv The Flemisch Waterway, is expanding the Zeeschelde and its tributaries as part of the Sigmaplan, creating more space for water flow.

== Siltation between Gentbrugge and Melle ==
Between Melle and Gentbrugge, the Zeeschelde has significantly silted up. On the one hand, this has created unique mudflats and salt marshes. On the other hand, the silting hinders the smooth drainage of precipitation. Therefore, the risk of flooding is very high in the areas along this part of the river. Moreover, without intervention, the silting would only increase, and so would the flood risk. Large amounts of silt are present in the silted-up area, which has caused quite a nuisance to residents and recreationists in the past.

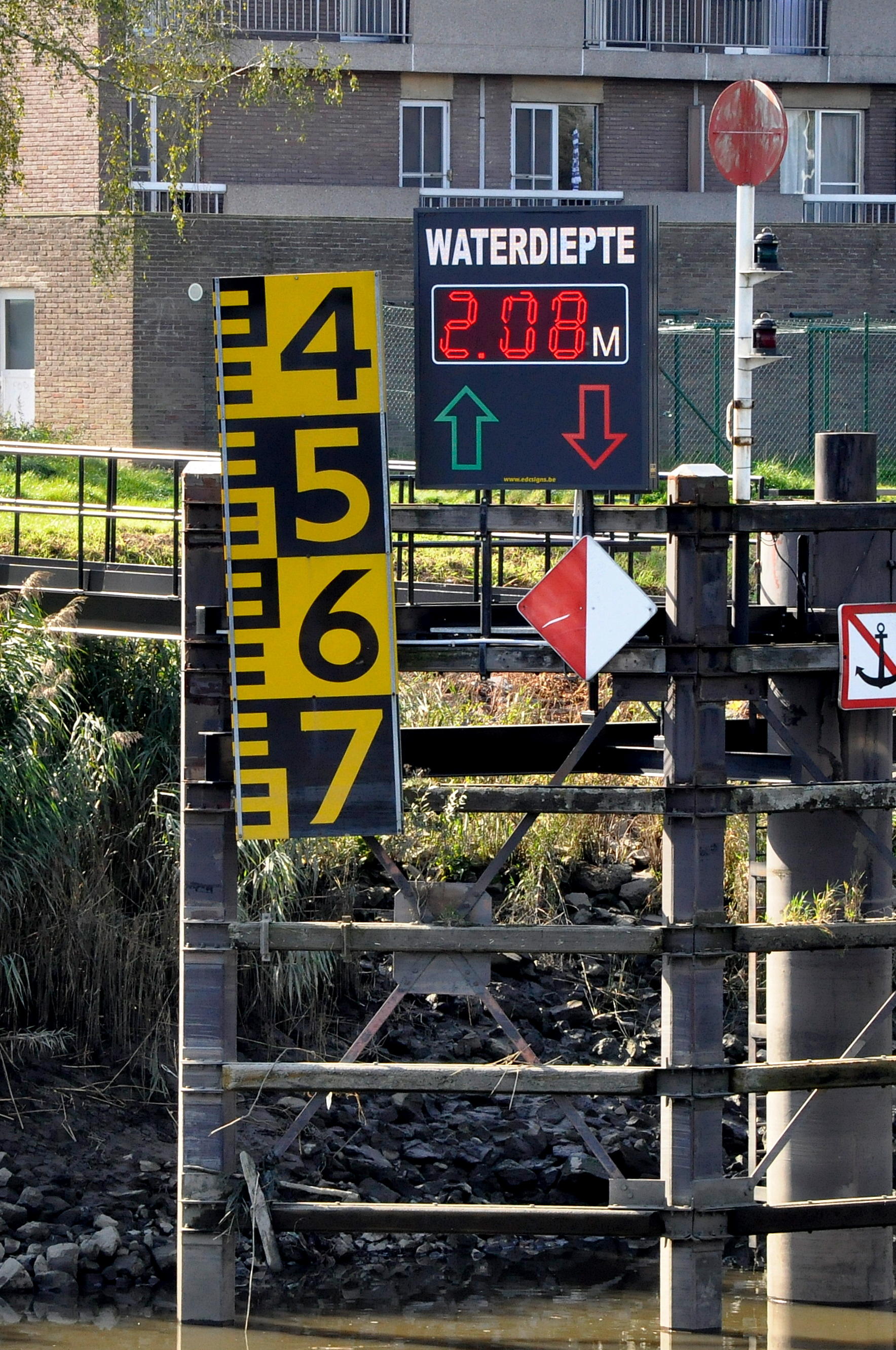
Water depth 2.08 m in Melle

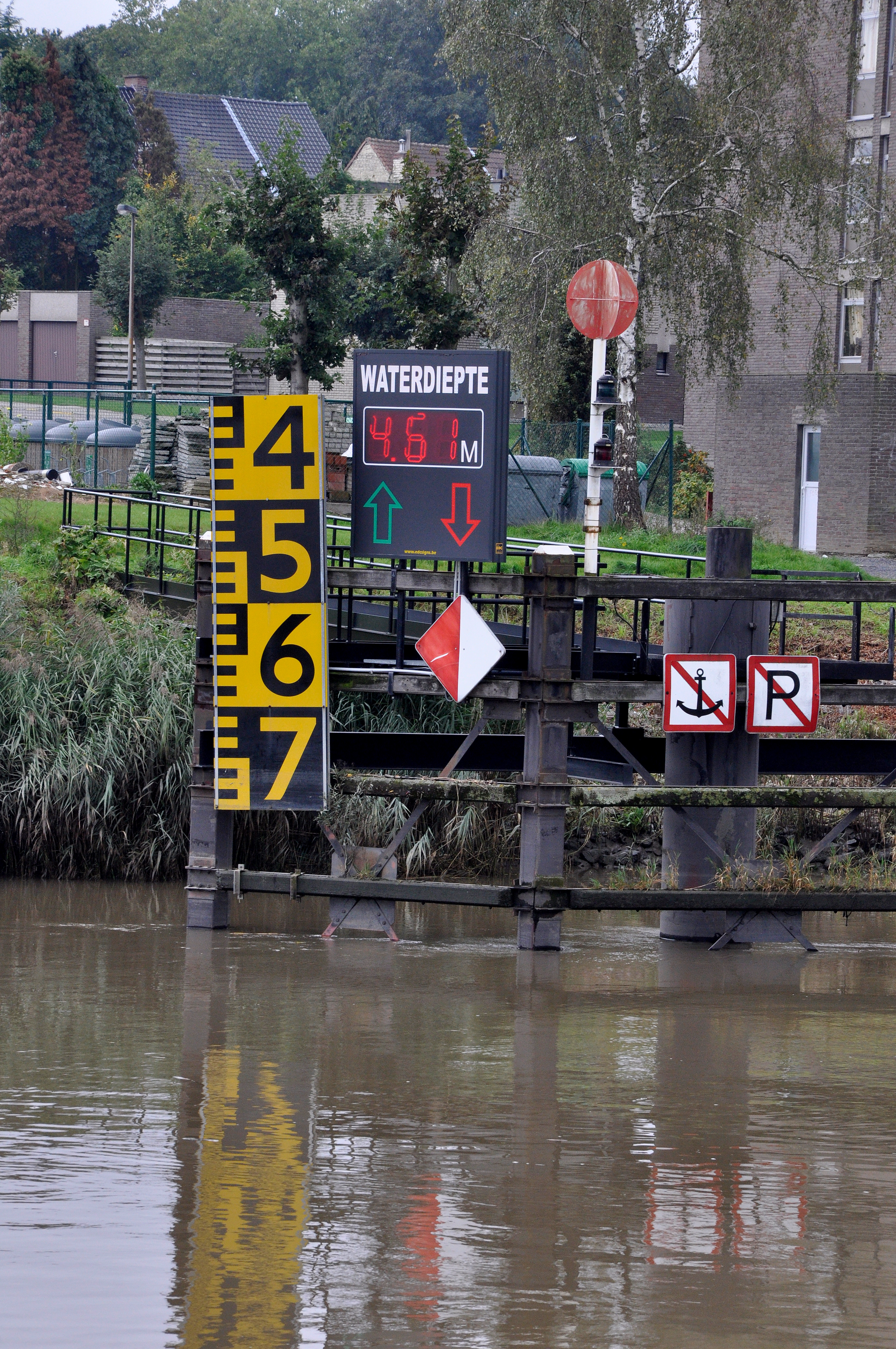
Water depth 4.61 m in Melle at another time

=== Sigma project Scheldemeander Ghent-Wetteren ===
To increase the safety of the surrounding area and alleviate the gnat infestation, The Flemisch Waterway wants to carry out dredging works between Gentbrugge and Melle and implement the Sigmaproject Scheldemeander Gent-Wetteren. The project area covers the Flemish municipalities of Ghent (Gentbrugge and Sint-Amandsberg), Destelbergen, Heusden, and Wetteren. The Scheldt basin does not yet meet the safety standards of the Sigma Plan.

==== Safety ====
W&Z intends to construct a new lock near Heusden. Natuurpunt and the residents' association GEzwiNT are opposing these plans. They are concerned that the construction of the lock would be excessively expensive and could lead to the loss of valuable natural areas. However, the latter scenario would occur anyway without interventions. The Zeeschelde would continue to silt up, ultimately resulting in its complete isolation from the sea.

==== Nature ====
The tidal nature between Gentbrugge and Melle would disappear because of the new lock, but that loss would be absorbed by the Sigma Project in the former sand extraction pit of Melle and the controlled flood area with controlled, reduced tide (GOG-GGG) Ham. Those areas would be connected to the Scheldt so that ebb and flow make themselves felt there. Over time, valuable mudflats and salt marshes would be created, where numerous birds and fish would thrive. The new lock in Heusden would also serve as a connection between the river nature upstream and the tidal nature downstream of the lock. After all, some fish species must migrate from one habitat to another to complete their life cycle.

=== State of affairs ===
In the summer of 2014, the environmental impact assessment (EIA) for the Scheldemeander Ghent-Wetteren Sigma project was approved. Currently, the GRUP (Gewestelijk Ruimtelijk uitvoeringsplan) for the project area is being drafted.

== See also ==
- Scheldt
- Melle, Belgium
- List of rivers of Belgium
- List of rivers of France
