= List of protected heritage sites in Habay =

This table shows an overview of the protected heritage sites in the Walloon town Habay. This list is part of Belgium's national heritage.

Object	Year/architect	Town/section	Address	Coordinates	Number^{?}	Image
Washing place ^{(nl)} ^{(fr)}		Habay	rue de la Fontaine	49.726743°N 5.535416°E	85046-CLT-0001-01 Info	Wasplaats
Washing place ^{(nl)} ^{(fr)}		Habay	rue de Grimodé	49.709351°N 5.532876°E	85046-CLT-0002-01 Info	Wasplaats
Ensemble of Saint-Hubert chapel, surrounded by three lime trees and situated along the road to Habay la Vella ^{(nl)} ^{(fr)}		Habay		49.732628°N 5.618386°E	85046-CLT-0003-01 Info	
Chapel Saint Hubert: interior and exterior ^{(nl)} ^{(fr)}		Habay	rue de la Rochette 53, Habay-la-Vieille	49.732436°N 5.619999°E	85046-CLT-0004-01 Info	
Quarry and field (the 'Gentianes'), along the road between Ansart and Harinsart ^{(nl)} ^{(fr)}		Habay	Rulles	49.700870°N 5.528697°E	85046-CLT-0005-01 Info	
Chapel Notre-Dame du Mont Carmel, the hexagonal walls of the old cemetery and all graves ^{(nl)} ^{(fr)}		Habay	Rulles	49.718893°N 5.565637°E	85046-CLT-0006-01 Info	Kapel Notre-Dame du Mont Carmel, de zeshoekige muur van de oude begraafplaats en alle graven

== See also ==
- List of protected heritage sites in Luxembourg (Belgium)
- Habay
