= Habay =

Municipality in Wallonia, Belgium

Habay Habâ (Walloon)
- Municipality
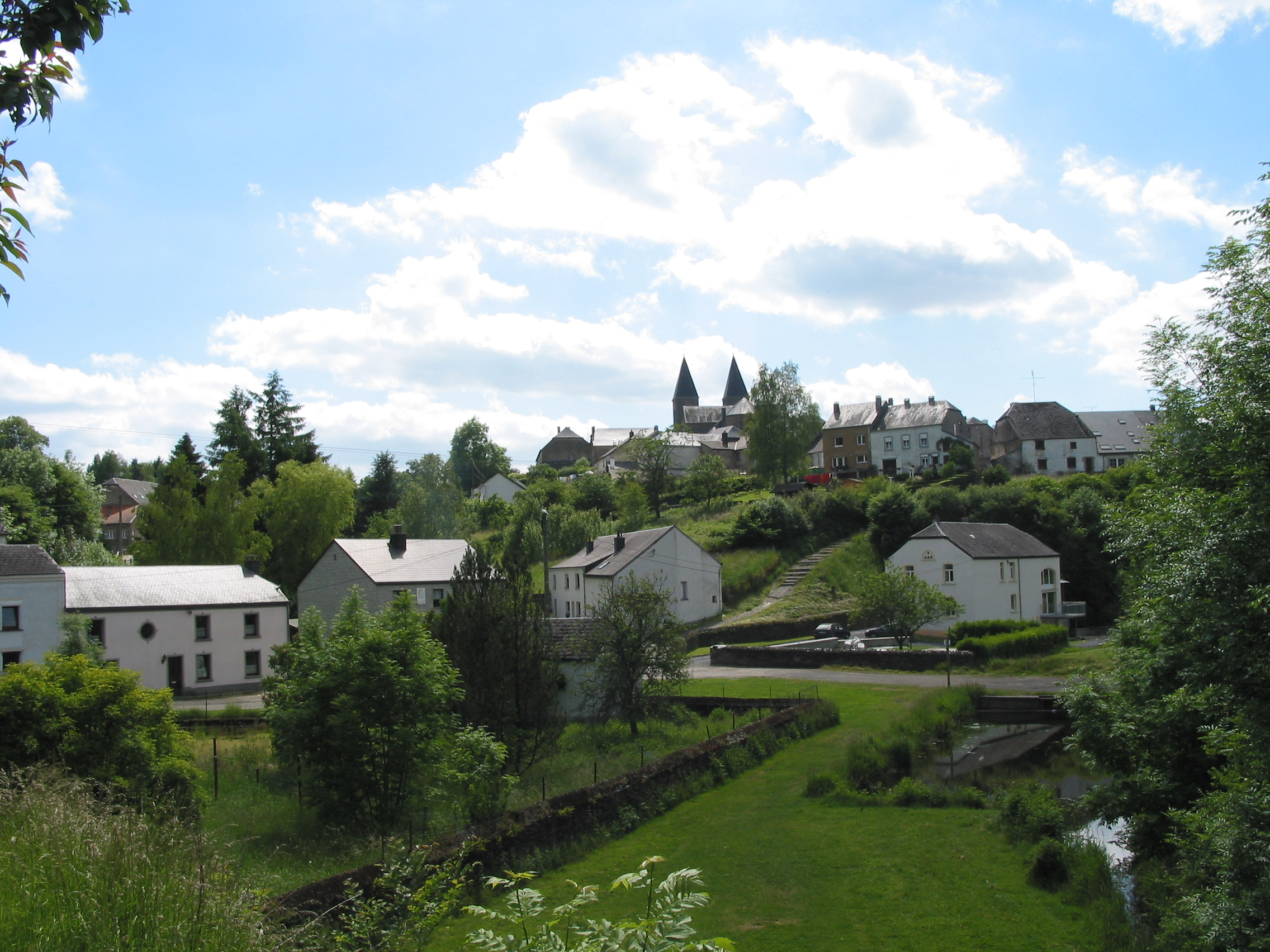
- Habay-la-Neuve

- Flag Coat of arms

- Location of Habay in Luxembourg province
- Interactive map of Habay
- Location in Belgium
- Coordinates: 49°44′N 05°37′E
- Country: Belgium
- Community: French Community
- Region: Wallonia
- Province: Luxembourg
- Arrondissement: Virton

Government
  - Mayor: Serge Bodeux (MR, Pour Habay)
  - Governing party: Pour Habay

Area
  - Total: 103.52 km^{2} (39.97 sq mi)

Population (2018-01-01)
  - Total: 8,387
  - Density: 81.02/km^{2} (209.8/sq mi)
- Postal codes: 6720, 6721, 6723, 6724
- NIS code: 85046
- Area codes: 063
- Website: (in French) www.habay.be

Habay (French pronunciation: [abe]; Walloon: Habâ) is a municipality of Wallonia located in the province of Luxembourg, Belgium.

On 1 January 2007 the municipality, which covers 103.64 km^{2}, had 7,903 inhabitants, giving a population density of 76.3 inhabitants per km^{2}.

The municipality consists of the following districts: Anlier, Habay-la-Neuve (seat of municipal council), Habay-la-Vieille, Hachy, Houdemont, and Rulles. Other population centers include: Harinsart, Marbehan, Nantimont, and Orsainfaing.

== See also ==
- List of protected heritage sites in Habay
