= Marbehan =

Coordinates: 49°43.5′N 5°32.15′E

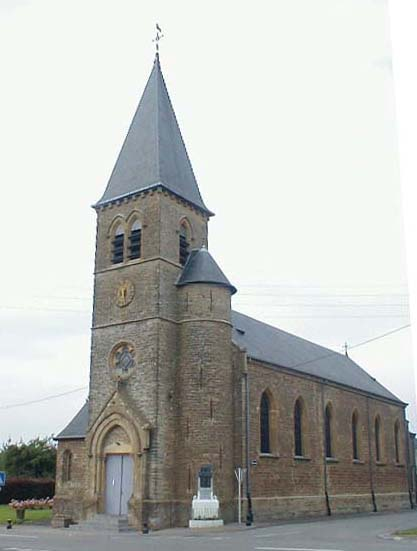
Church of Marbehan

Marbehan (French pronunciation: [maʁbəɑ̃]) is a village of Wallonia in the municipality of Habay, district of Rulles, located in the province of Luxembourg, Belgium.

The village has around 1000 inhabitants.

== Geography ==
Marbehan lies on the border between Gaume and the Ardennes, it is therefore sometimes dubbed "La porte de la Gaume", for its getaway access to the surrounding region. The village lies on the river "Mellier", which flows into the "Rulles" nearby.

The surrounding villages are Mellier to the north, Rulles and Villers-sur-Semois to the east, Harinsart and Ansart/Tintigny to the south, and Rossignol and Orsinfaing to the west.

The surroundings of the village mainly consist of farmland, marshland around the 'Mellier', and the Ardennes forest.

== Commercial activities ==
Marbehan counts a number of different stores and two factories. One of them called Lambiotte S.A. produce chemicals and the other one called Trabelbo S.A. is an industrial carpentry.

== Transport ==
The village has a railway station on the line IC 162 Brussels-Luxembourg of the SNCB network. Marbehan is also served by many buses from the TEC. The E411 highway nearest exit is a mere two kilometers from the village.

== Education ==
There are two primary and maternal schools in the village.
