= Gulp (river) =

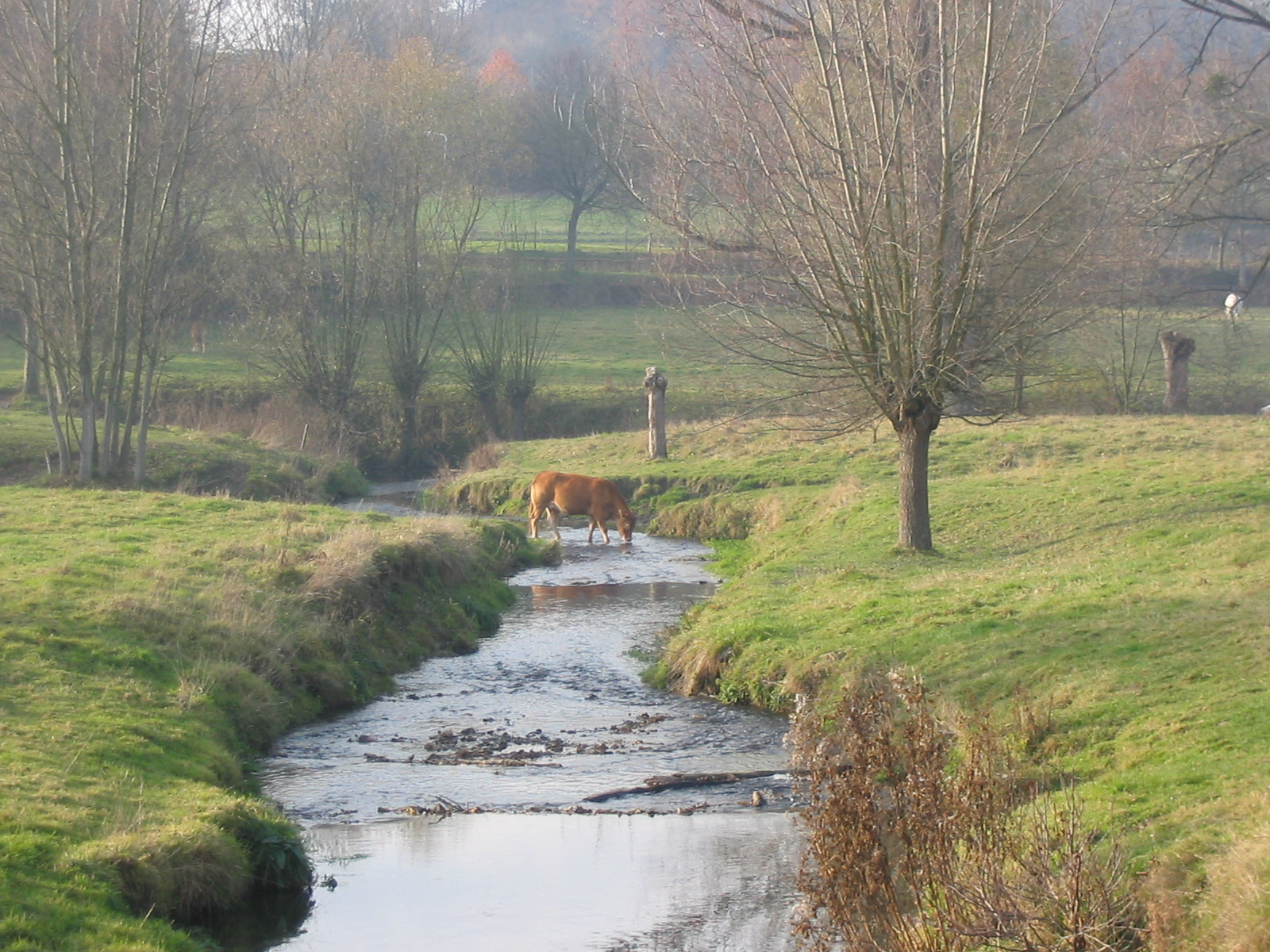
- The river Gulp near Slenaken

Location
- Country: Belgium, Netherlands

Physical characteristics
- Source
  - location: near Henri-Chapelle
- Mouth
  - location: Geul near Gulpen
  - coordinates: 50°49′13″N 5°53′48″E
- Length: 20.7 km (12.9 mi)

Basin features
- Progression: Geul→ Meuse→ North Sea

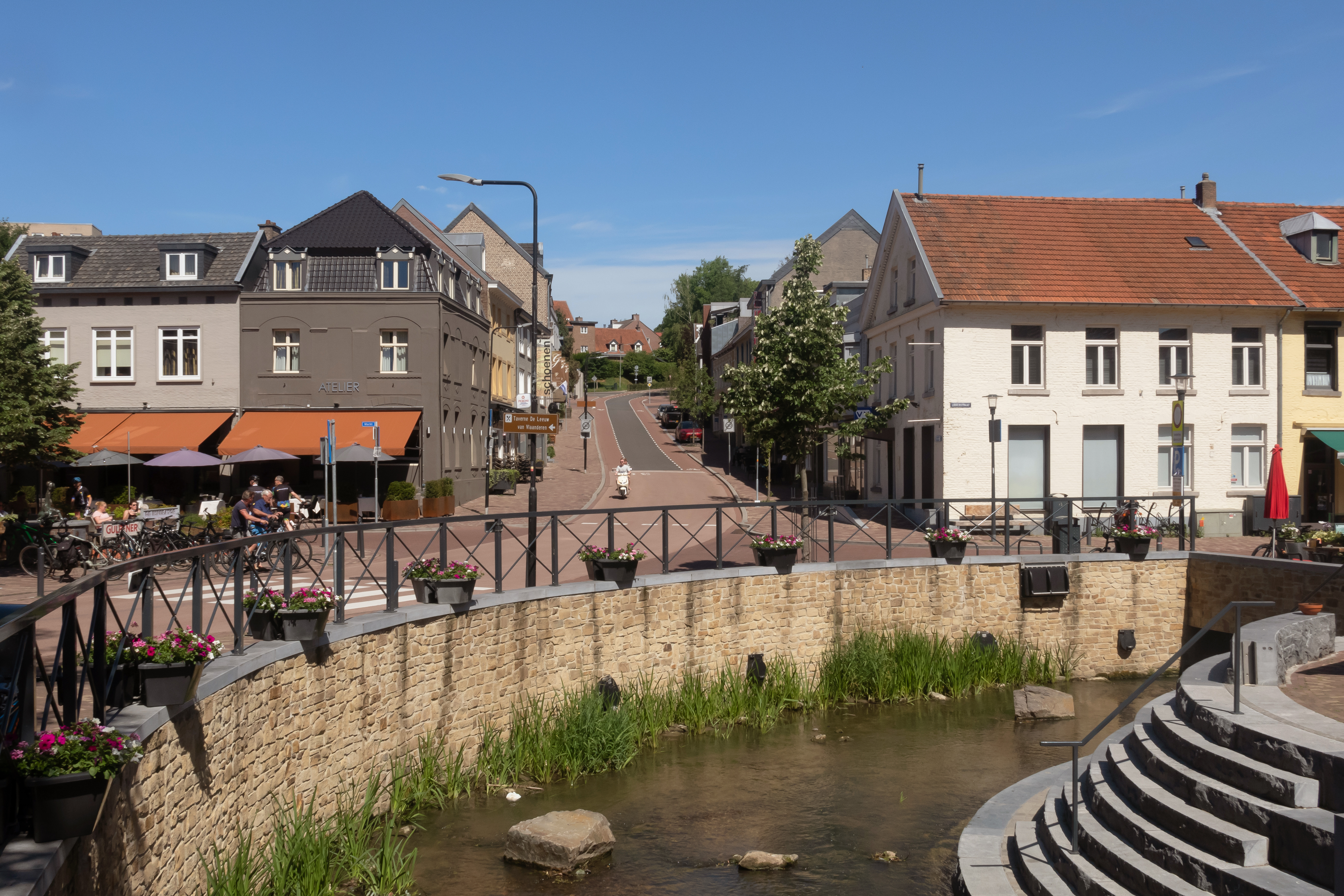
the Gulp in Gulpen

The Gulp (Dutch: [ˈɣʏl(ə)p], Limburgish: [ˈɣʏl(ə)p]; French: Galoppe) is a 21 kilometres (13 mi) long river in eastern Belgium and southeastern Netherlands. It flows through the Belgian provinces of Liège and Limburg, and the Dutch province of Limburg. It is a strongly meandering, fast flowing, left-bank tributary of the Geul river. Because of it strong meanders, it is difficult to determine its exact length.

During Roman times, the river was called Galopia or Gulippa, meaning little Geul or upper brook. The Gulp is a real trout stream: flowing fast and rich in oxygen. Brown trout are abundant. The landscape of the narrow Gulp valley resembles much the valley of the Geul: a fascinating mixture of deciduous forests, meadows, farmland, muddy banks, stream pools, orchards and holle wegen (eroded dirt roads).

== Flow ==
The source is in Henri-Chapelle. It joins the Geul near Gulpen, overlooked by motte-and-bailey castle Gracht Burggraaf. It flows through the villages Hombourg, Teuven (both in Belgium), Slenaken and Gulpen (both in the Netherlands).

From its source in Henri-Chapelle, a village of the municipality of Welkenraedt, province of Liège it runs in a northwestern direction across the Dutch border, after which it flows into the Geul. This happens near a motte-and-bailey castle called "Burggraaf" at Gulpen, where also the Eyserbeek river joins the Geul from the opposite bank. This is the place and municipality to which it evidently gets its name.

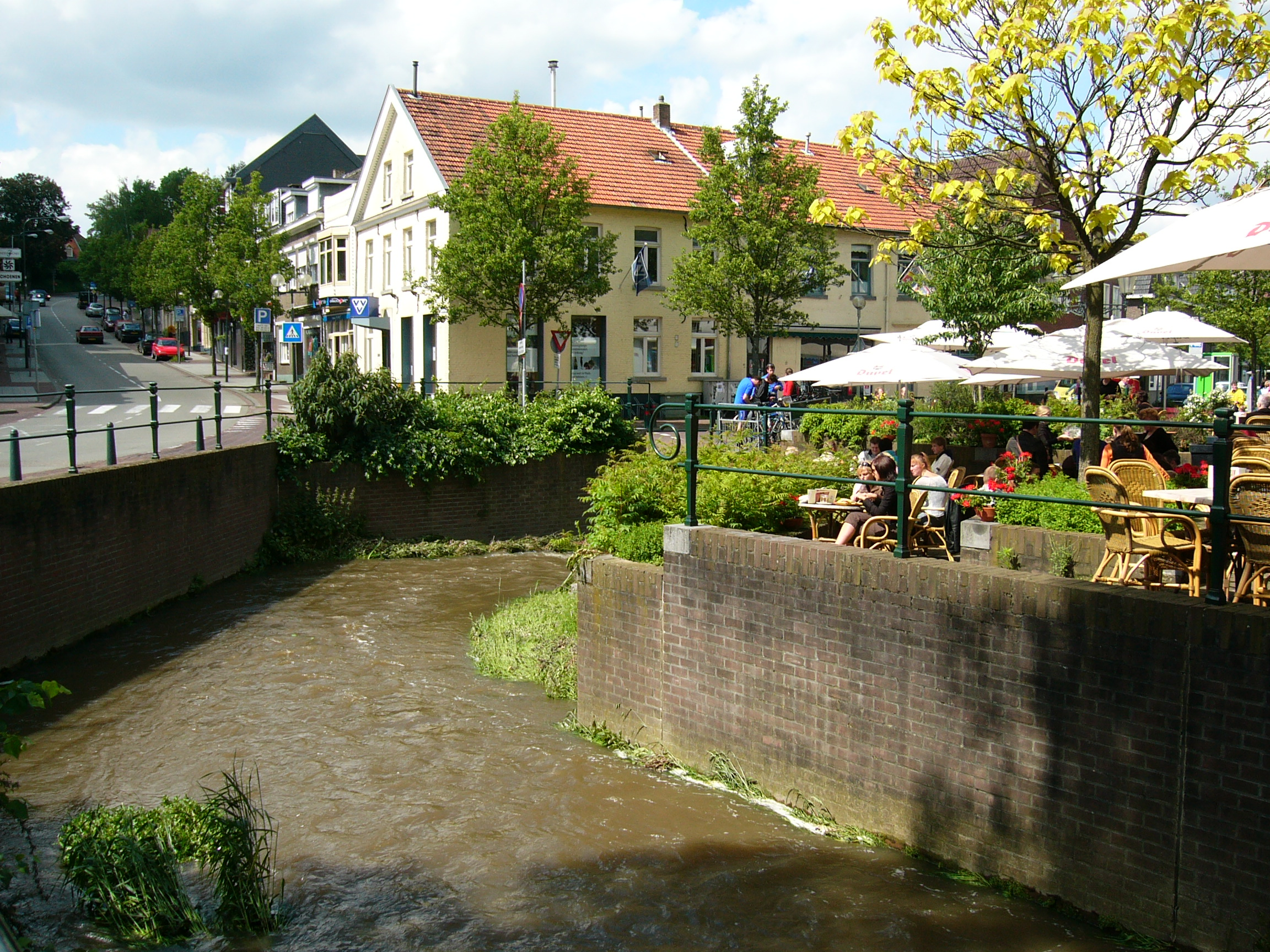
The Gulp in the center of Gulpen
