= Geul =

Geul German: Göhl, French: Gueule
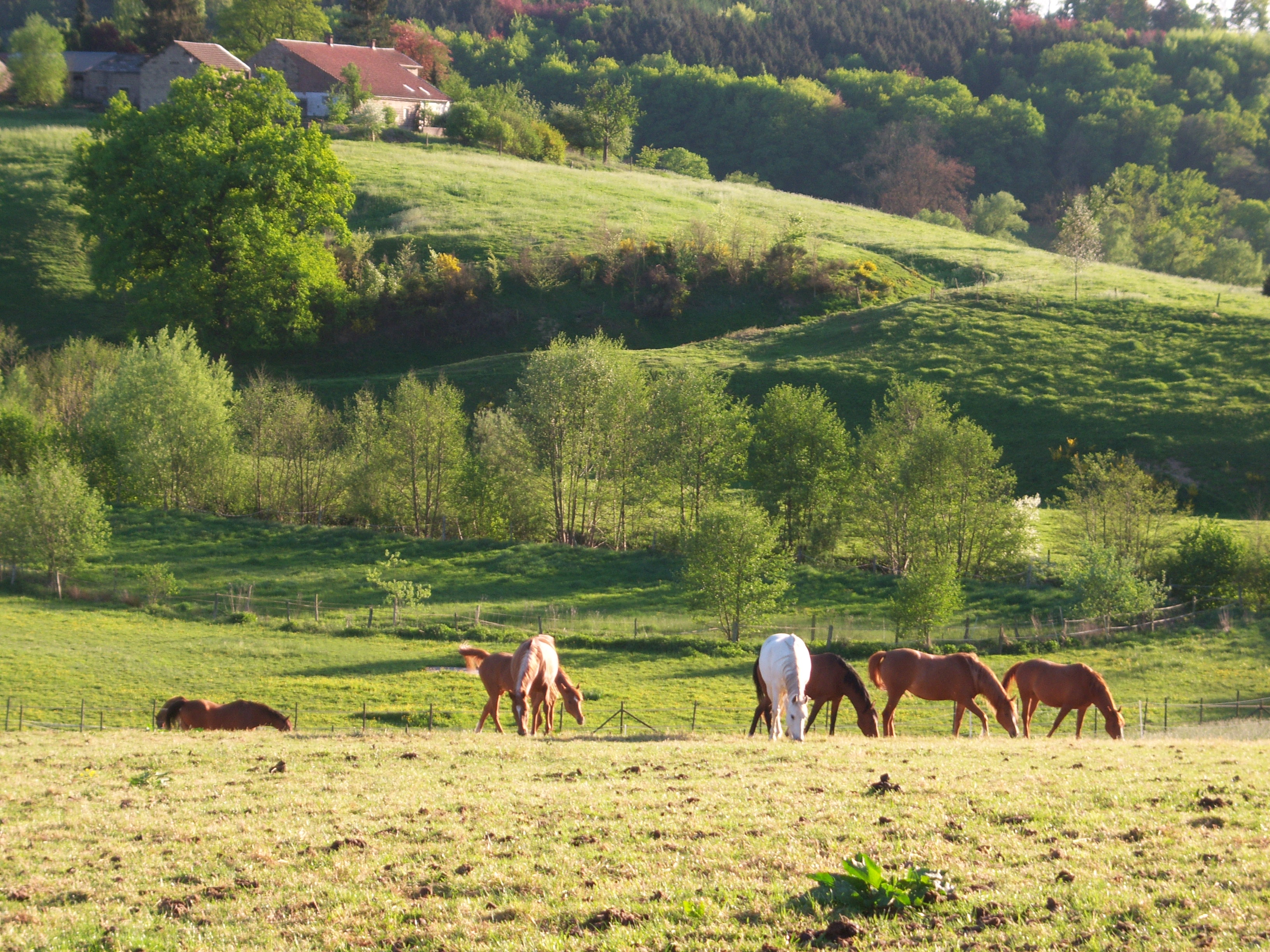
- The Geul valley in Plombières, Belgium

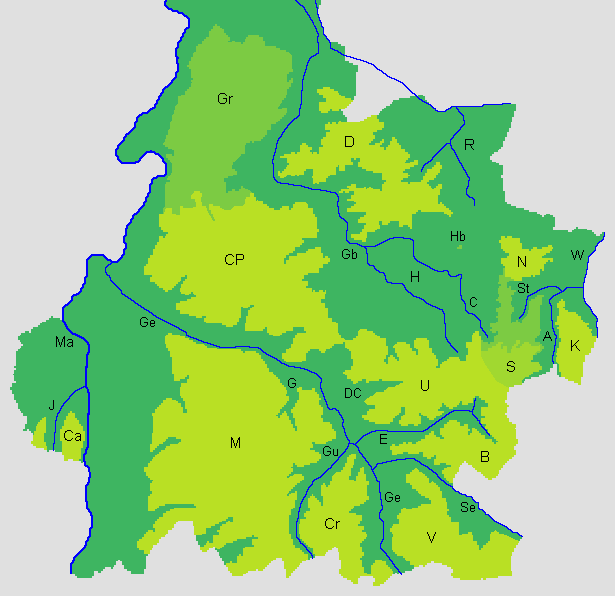
- The Geul (Ge) in South Limburg, with tributaries Eyserbeek (E), Gulp (Gu) and Selzerbeek (Se).

Location
- Country: Belgium, Netherlands

Physical characteristics
- Source
  - location: near Lichtenbusch
  - elevation: ±300 m (980 ft)
- Mouth
  - location: Meuse near Bunde
  - coordinates: 50°53′49″N 5°43′4″E
- Length: 58.0 km (36.0 mi)

Basin features
- Progression: Meuse→ North Sea

The Geul ([ˈɣøːl], Limburgish: [ˈɣøːl]; German: Göhl [ˈɡøːl]; French: Gueule [ɡœl]) is a river in Belgium and in the Netherlands, where it is a right-bank tributary to the river Meuse.

== Geography ==
The source of the Geul is at about 300 metres (980 ft) above sea level in northeastern Belgium near the German border, south of the German town of Aachen. From there, after flowing some 20 kilometres (12 mi) in a northwestern direction, it leaves Belgium and enters the Netherlands at Cottessen in the Vaals municipality. After a further 38 kilometres (24 mi) in a west-northwestern direction through the southernmost part of Limburg, which in its turn is the most southern province of the Netherlands, it flows into the Meuse, north of the city of Maastricht.

A tributary of the Geul is the Gulp.

Places through which the Geul passes are among others Kelmis (Belgium), Valkenburg aan de Geul, including Schin op Geul, and Meerssen (Netherlands).

== Pollution ==
The water of the Geul is polluted seriously with heavy metals zinc and lead and as a result also is a serious source of heavy metal inflow into the Meuse.

This pollution is a result of former zinc and lead mining activities near the Belgian towns of Kelmis (La Calamine) and Plombières (formerly named Bleiberg).

The last one of these mines have closed early in the 20th century. One of the reasons for giving up mining activities in Plombières was the occasional flooding of the mine by the Geul, as the bedrock (mainly Carboniferous limestone) contains many faults and fissures.

Although mine factory buildings have been demolished, old railway dikes still are abundantly present in the area. They provide ideal hiking routes, that are known for the presence of so-called "zinc flora" (zinc-tolerant plants, such as yellow calamine violet and Viola calaminaria).

== Significant events ==
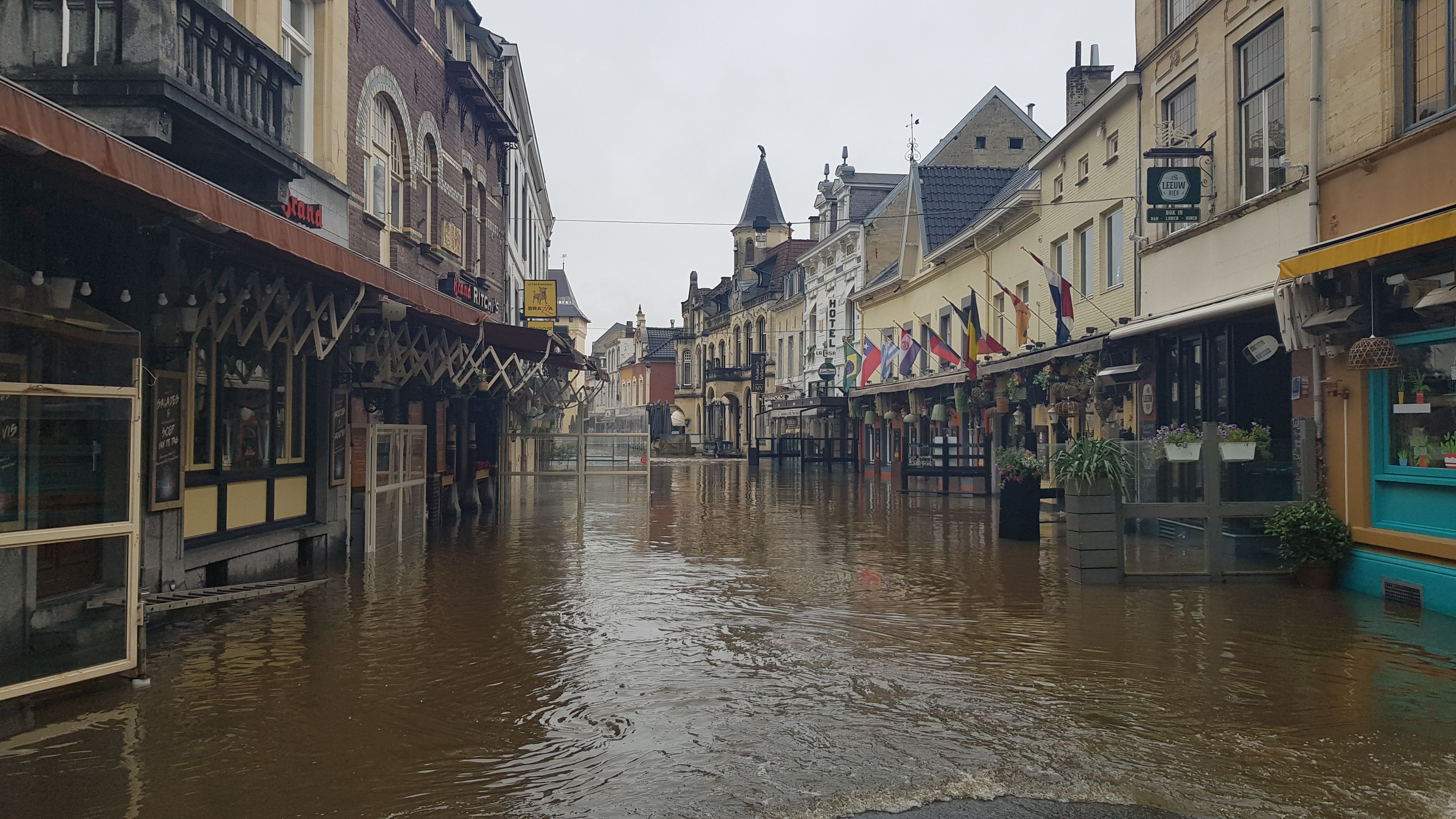
Flooding of the Geul in the downtown business district during the 2021 European floods

During the 2021 European floods, the banks of the river flooded, including in some of the major population centers such as Valkenburg aan de Geul.

== Gallery ==
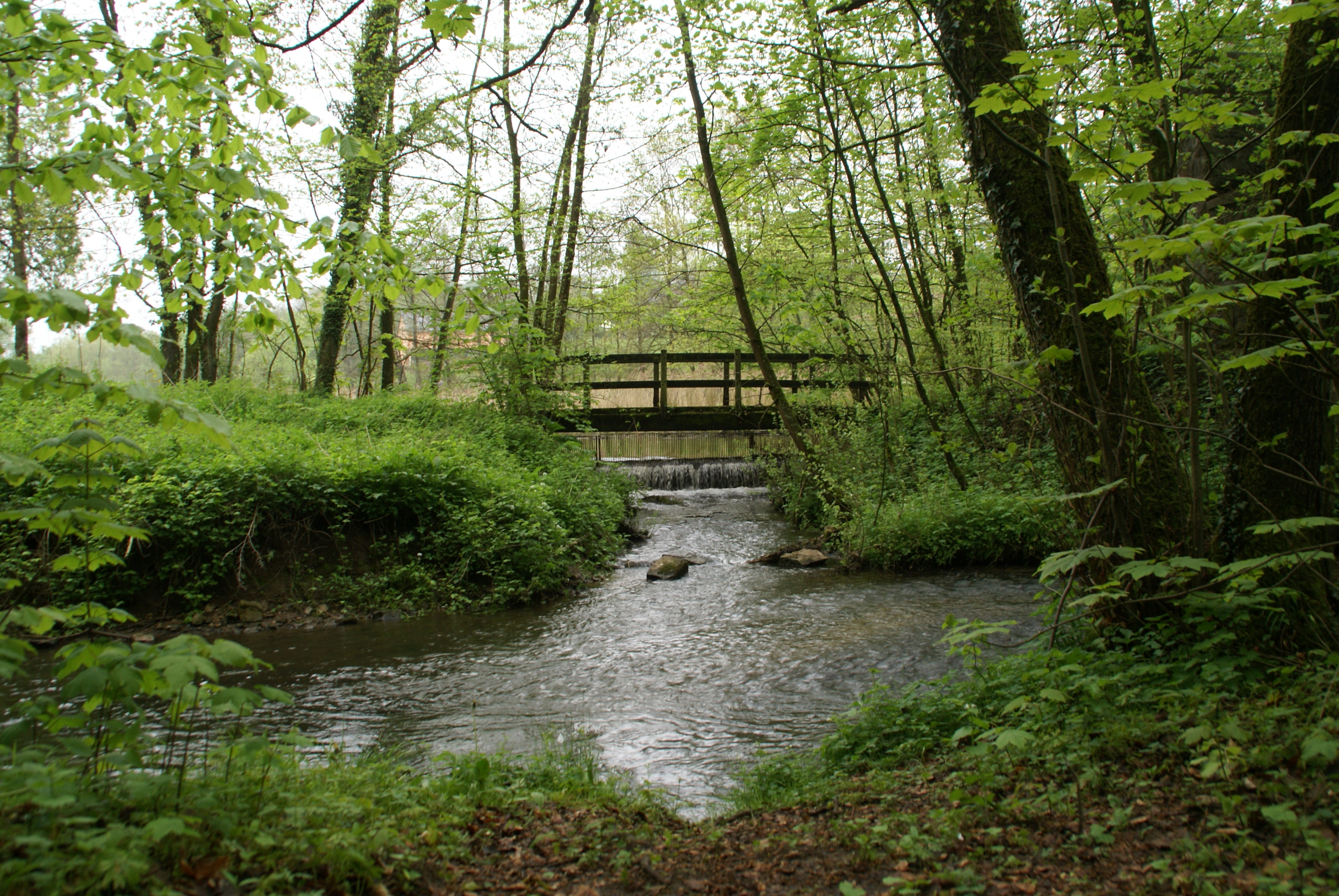
At Kelmis Tueljebach

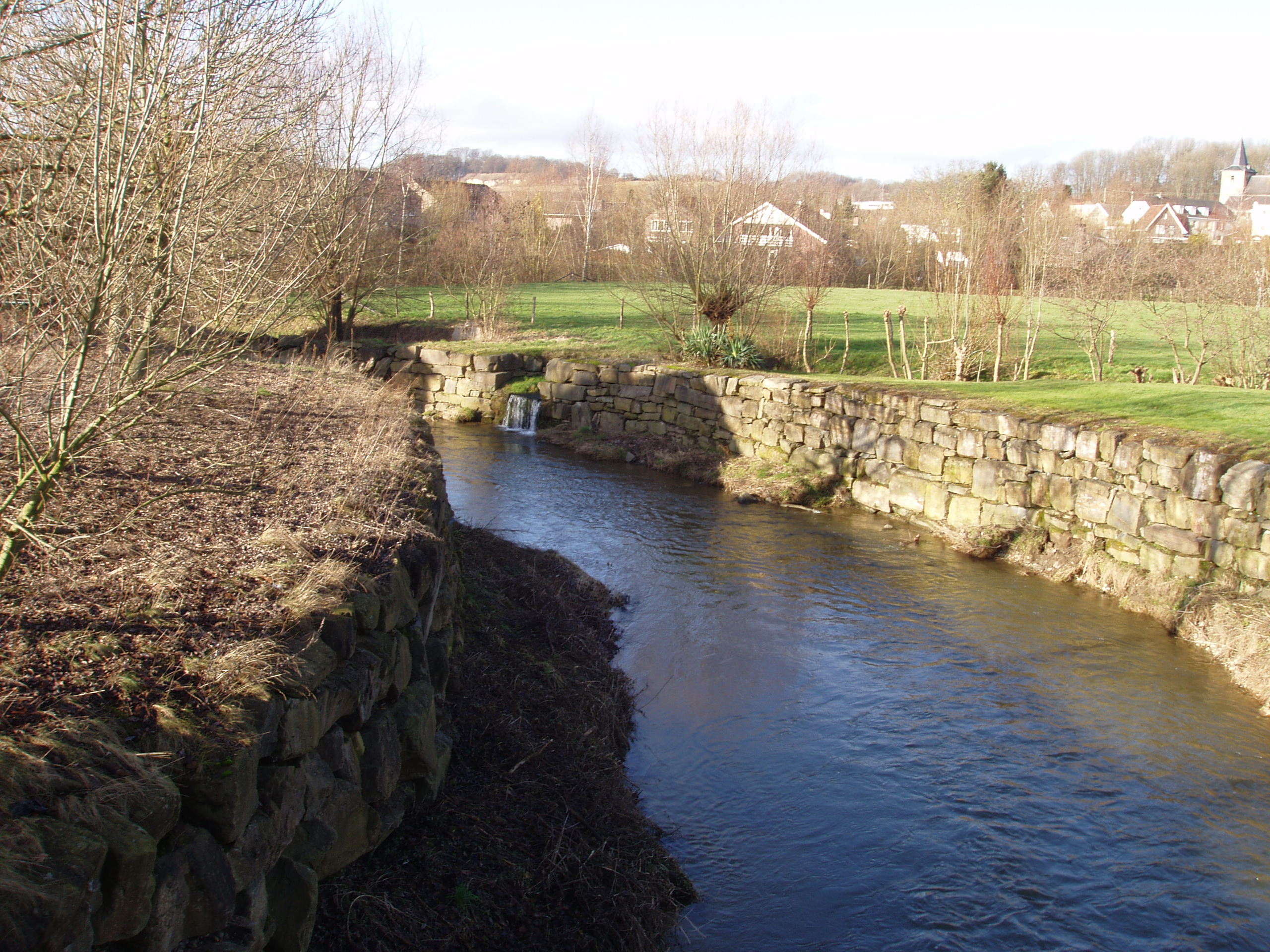
At Schin op Geul

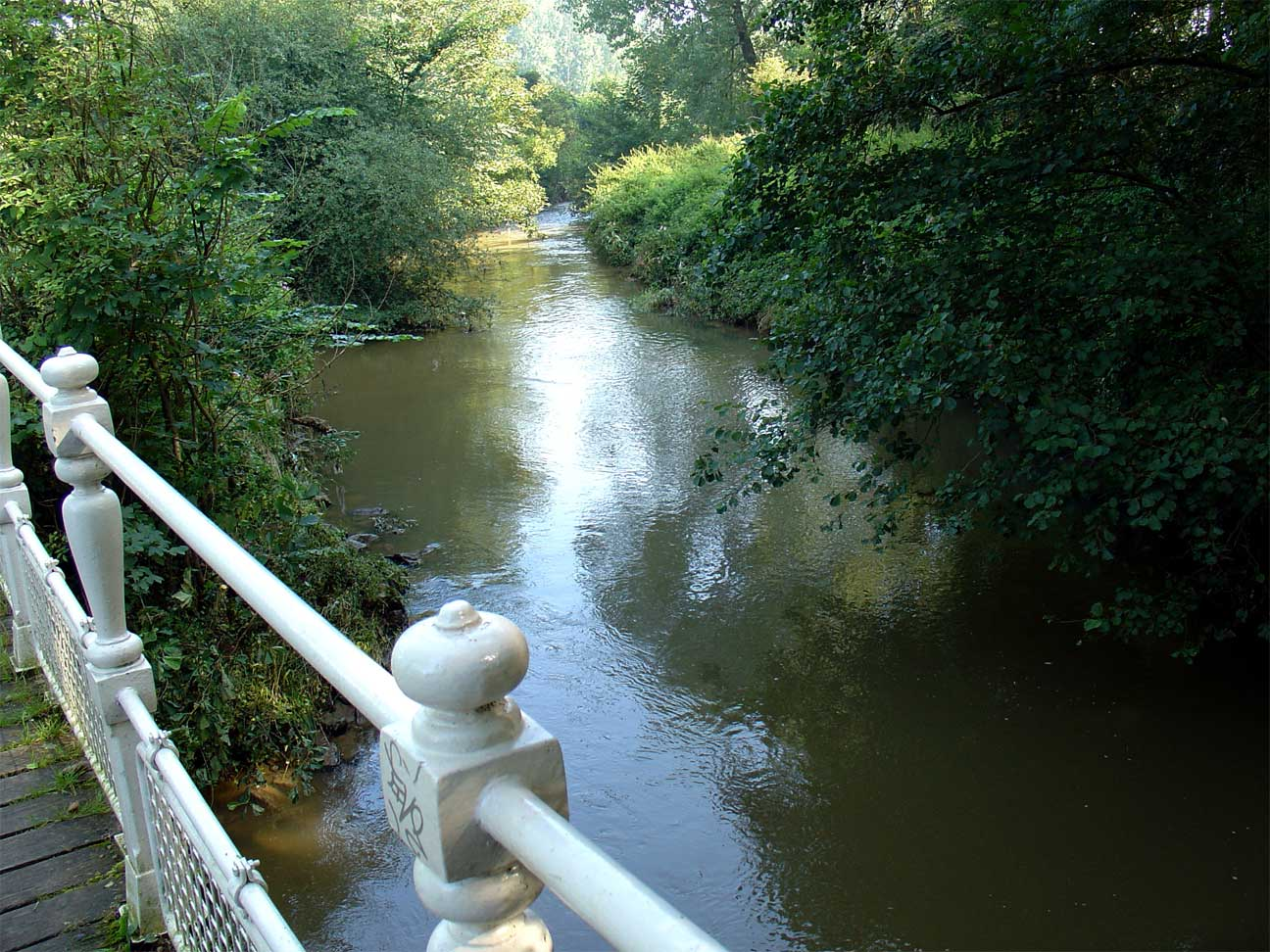
At Strabeek

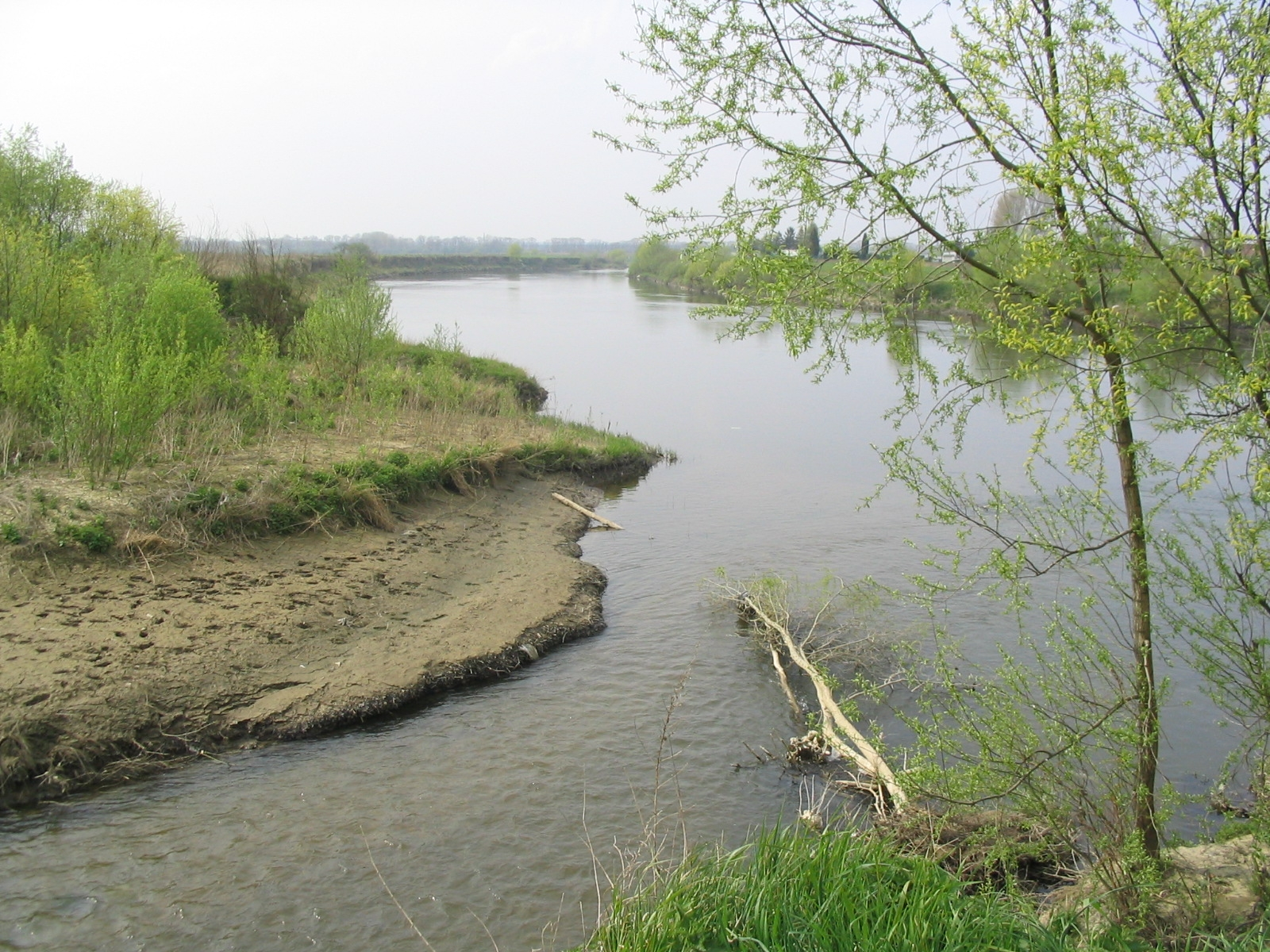
Estuary at Voulwammes

== See also ==
- Oehl
