= Clara Fey =

Catholic nun

Blessed Clara Fey PCJ
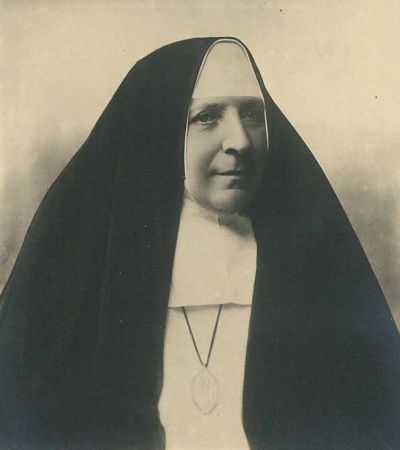

Religious
- Born: 11 April 1815; Aachen, North Rhine-Westphalia, Kingdom of Prussia
- Died: 8 May 1894 (aged 79); Simpelveld, Limburg, Netherlands
- Venerated in: Roman Catholic Church
- Beatified: 5 May 2018, Cathedral of Gottesmutter Maria, Aachen, Germany by Cardinal Angelo Amato
- Feast: 8 May
- Attributes: Religious habit
- Patronage: Sisters of the Poor Child Jesus

Clara Fey, PCJ (11 April 1815 – 8 May 1894) was a German Catholic nun who founded the Sisters of the Poor Child Jesus. Her life was dedicated to providing aid to the poor, with particular emphasis on education, first in Aachen and later in the Netherlands.

A decree introducing her cause for beatification was issued in 1958 by Pope Pius XII, at which time she became titled a Servant of God. In 1991, following confirmation of her heroic virtue by Pope John Paul II, she was titled Venerable. Pope Francis confirmed a miraculous healing attributed to her intercession on 4 May 2017. Her beatification was celebrated in Aachen on 5 May 2018.

== Life ==
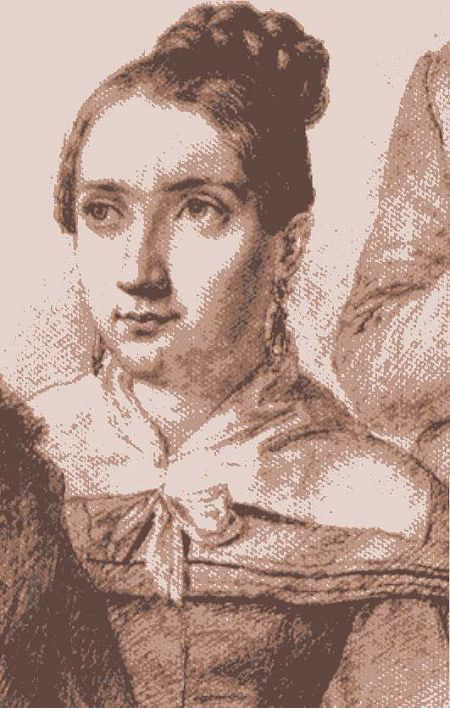
Young Clara Fey

Clara Fey was born on 11 April 1815 in Aachen, the fourth of five children of wealthy textile industrialist Louis and his wife Katherine. Louis was to die following a stroke in 1820, when Clara was aged five years. Fey studied under noted teacher Luise Hensel and became acquainted with Pauline von Mallinckrodt and Franziska Schevier. In her childhood she observed the poor conditions in her town and was resolved to aid the poor in their suffering more so because of the importance her mother placed on helping those less fortunate than herself. To that end she would later set up a school with some likeminded friends in Aachen in 1837 in order to cater to the educational needs of poor children. Fey's brother Andreas would go on to become a priest, later serving as the vicar of the Saint Paul parish in Aachen.

On 2 February 1844, Fey established the Sisters of the Poor Child Jesus in Aachen, as a means of leading children to Jesus Christ and educating children in a religious environment. Around 1835 she started to read the works of Teresa of Ávila and professed a desire to become a Carmelite nun. In 1841, however, her spiritual advisor Wilhelm Sartorius motivated her to instead read the works of Francis de Sales for greater theological inspiration. Fey made her vows as a nun in 1850. Her order received diocesan approval on 28 January 1848 from the Archbishop of Cologne and a papal decree of praise from Pope Pius IX on 11 July 1862, with full papal approval for the order issued by Pope Leo XIII on 15 June 1888. The Rule of her order would be based on the teachings of Augustine of Hippo. Fey served as the order's first superior general from its founding until her death despite her frail health and frequent bouts of illness. In 1875, the Kulturkampf forced her and the order to relocate to the Netherlands where she remained until her death in May 1894. After her death a devotional cult began at the site of her grave in Simpelveld.

== Beatification ==
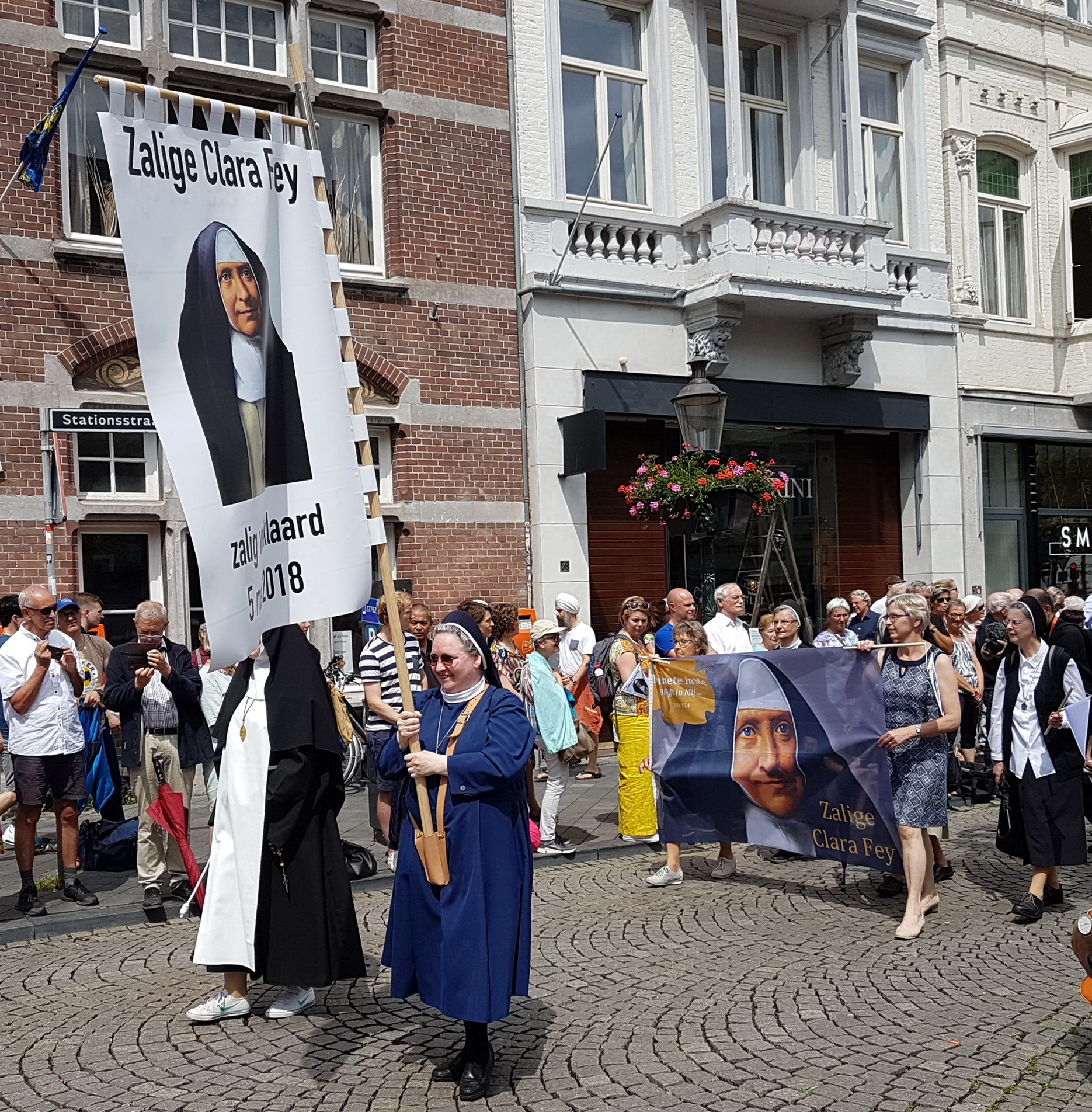
Sisters of the Poor Child Jesus carrying banners of the beatified Clara Fey in the Relics Procession in Maastricht, May 2018

The beatification process opened in Roermond in an informative process that lasted from 1916 until its closure in 1924 while a second inquest was held from 1923 until 1924. Fey's spiritual writings were approved by theologians on 18 June 1930 and 10 December 1943. One final process – the apostolic one – was held from 1963 until being closed in 1967. The formal introduction to the cause came on 11 August 1958 under Pope Pius XII and she became titled as a Servant of God. Officials from the cause compiled and submitted the Positio dossier in 1983 to the Congregation for the Causes of Saints. Theologians investigated and approved it on 29 May 1990 as did the C.C.S. officials on 26 February 1991. The late religious was named as Venerable on 14 May 1991 after Pope John Paul II confirmed that she had lived a model life of heroic virtue.

Pope Francis authorized the promulgation of a decree on 4 May 2017 approving a miracle attributed to her intercession; this allowed for her to be beatified in Aachen on 5 May 2018.

The current postulator for this cause is Andrea Ambrosi.
