= St Michael's Catholic Grammar School =

St. Michael's Catholic Grammar School

Location
- Nether Street; Finchley, London, N12 7NJ; England; 51.6144°N 0.1805°W

Information
- Type: Voluntary aided grammar school
- Motto: Quis ut Deus ("Who is like God?")
- Religious affiliation: Roman Catholic
- Established: 1908
- Founders: Sisters of the Poor Child Jesus
- Local authority: Barnet
- Department for Education URN: 101361 Tables
- Ofsted: Reports
- Chair of Governors: A Gartlan
- Headmaster: Michael Stimpson
- Chaplain: J Diame
- Gender: Girls (Mixed sixth form)
- Age: 11 to 18
- Enrolment: c.750
- Colour: Purple
- Website: https://www.st-michaels.barnet.sch.uk/

St Michael's Catholic Grammar School is a voluntary aided Roman Catholic Grammar School for girls, and boys in the sixth form, situated in North Finchley, Barnet, London. Its current headmaster is Michael Stimpson.

== History ==
The school was founded as St Michael's Convent in 1908 by the Sisters of the Poor Child Jesus and is now under their trusteeship. It was the first Roman Catholic school in Finchley since the Reformation. It was a small fee-paying school serving the parish.

Under the Education Act 1944, in 1958, St Michael's became a voluntary aided grammar school to complement the all-boys Finchley Catholic Grammar School (now Finchley Catholic High School). When the Barnet LEA abolished the tripartite system, St Michael's did not turn comprehensive and has remained a grammar school to this day.

In 2019, a new building was opened, containing additional classrooms, including science labs and a new library.

== Ofsted inspection reports ==
St Michael's is a high achieving school where relationships are excellent. The pupils are happy and well cared for morally, socially and spiritually. The school's national reputation in the Catholic community is justifiably high. (Ofsted, 1995)

St Michael's is an exceptional school; which is outstandingly effective because of its excellent leadership, management, teaching and learning (Ofsted, 2005)

== St Michael's curriculum ==
Classes offered include Religious Education, English, Mathematics, Latin, French, Spanish, Italian, History, Geography, Science, Music, Art, Physical Education, Drama, Technology, ICT and Education for Living with Citizenship. Pupils have a choice of either Food/Graphics Technology.

== St Michael's traditions ==
=== School uniform ===
The uniform consists of a pleated purple skirt (or grey trousers), a lilac shirt, and a purple jumper. In addition, there is a purple blazer which must be worn when travelling to and from school. During winter months, the blazer is supplanted by a long black coat.

The color originates from St. Michael's flower, the Michaelmas Daisy. The royal purple symbolizes the status of St. Michael as the archangel who quelled the rebellion of Lucifer.

=== School motto ===
The School motto "Quis ut deus" is a Latin translation of the sarcastic rhetorical question uttered by Archangel Michael as he slew Lucifer: "Who is like God?"

=== Houses ===
Key Stages 3–4 consist of 4 houses or forms, each one representing a different letter of the schools acronym (STMC): S- blue T- green M- red C- yellow The sixth form consists of 7 forms, each ones letter representing a Mary Ward value, with each one corresponding to a different main house (STMC): F- faith E- equality S- sincerity T- truth I- internationality JU- justice JO- joy House colours are worn on sports day.

=== School song ===
The school song Dux Michael, which is sung in Latin, is a praise of St. Michael the Archangel. It is always sung on St. Michael's Day and at various key stage certificate assemblies along with the school prayer.

=== School events ===
St Michael's Day is considered the most important day of the academic year at St Michael's. On this day the whole school, pupils and staff, join in the celebration of Mass in the school hall with a liturgy of music and drama. After Mass, free ice cream is given out to pupils and staff in celebration of St Michael the Archangel.

Mass is not only celebrated on St Michael's Day, but on the Holy Days of Obligation found in the Catholic Calendar. There are additionally Masses on every Friday at lunchtime as well as on the last days of academic terms. These practices form part of St Michael's Catholic ethos, along with daily prayer.

The staff assembly takes place on the last school assembly before the term breaks for Christmas. It is here that the staff organise an assembly for its pupils, either a talent show or a mini pantomime. Many events are organised throughout the year by the staff or various committees. An example includes the Cultural and Charity Committee which organise the traditional "Nigeria, Ireland & Montserrat v. The Rest of the World" netball match played by the staff on St Patrick's Day, with all proceeds donated to charity.

St Michael's celebrated their centenary on 28 September 2008, the day before St Michael's Day. The Duke of Gloucester was invited to the school to mark the centenary with the opening of the new sports hall.

== Notable former pupils ==
- Jill Paton Walsh (1937-2020) - author
- Karen Harrison (1960-2011) - first woman in Britain to be appointed as a train driver, trade unionist and political campaigner
- Jessica Martin (b. 1962) - actress and comedian
- Lisa Jewell (b. 1968) - author
- Natasha Collins (1976-2008) - children's TV presenter
- Lois Joel (b. 1999) - footballer for West Ham United
- Katy Hessel (b. 1994) - art historian
