= Kameņeca Manor =

Manor house in Latvia

- Latgale, Latvia
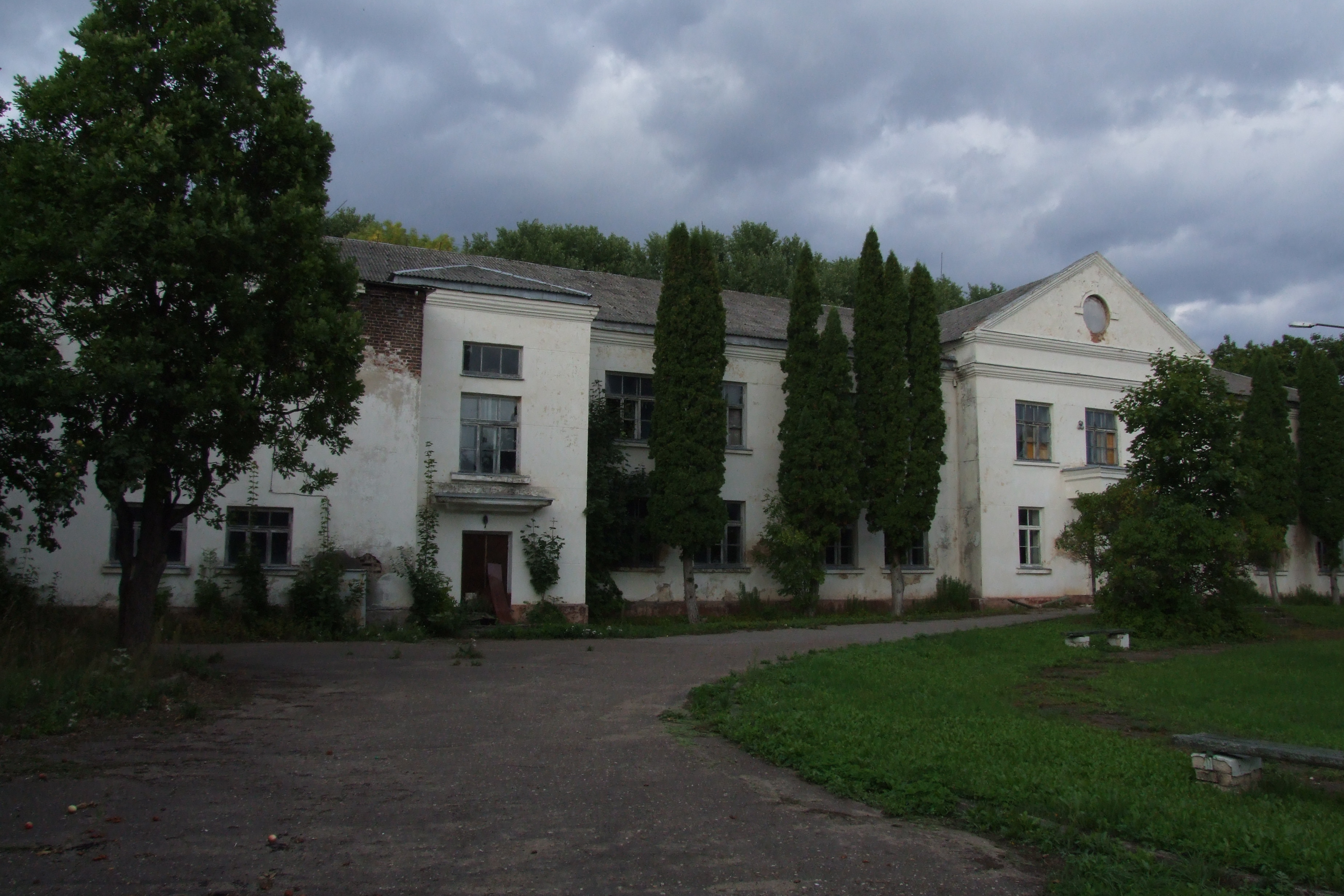

Site information
- Type: Manor House

Location
- Coordinates: 56°09′41.8″N 27°00′39.8″E

Kameņeca Manor (Latvian: Kameņecas muiža, Polish: Kamieniec, Russian: Каменец) is a manor house in Jaunaglonā, in the Aglona Parish of Preiļi Municipality in the Latgale region of Latvia.

== History ==
The manor complex, together with the stables, the chapel and the manor house, was built in the 18th century and reconstructed in the 20th century. It was property of Felkerzām, then Pavlovici and finally by Rauti noble families. The last owner of the manor was Michael Reuts.

After Latvian Agrarian Reform, by 1927, it housed a Catholic women's monastery and gymnasium, which was operating from November 18, 1929, to June 17, 1940. Establishment director was the Monsignor Alice Brooks. In the monastery and gymnasium operated congregation of the Sisters of the Poor Child Jesus, who came to Jaunaglonā from Vienna at the invitation of the Archbishop Antonijs Springovičs.

Later, during the Soviet era, the Aglona Mechanization School in 1940 was established on the property, then the Agricultural School, and later the Jaunaglonā High School. The school was dissolved in 2015 as a structural unit of Middle Latgale Vocational Secondary School. Today the manor is managed by Aglona Basilica Parish.

On Manor grounds there is a dendrological plantation and one of the oldest water mills in Latvia.

== See also ==
- List of palaces and manor houses in Latvia
