= List of mayors of Simpelveld =

This is a list of mayors of Simpelveld, Netherlands.

In 1794 the Southern Netherlands were occupied by France and eventually annexed on 1 October 1795. By law of 22 August 1795 the region was divided into municipalités de canton. All villages with less than 5000 citizens were to become part of bigger cantons. Simpelveld became part of the canton Rolduc. Within the canton it was allowed to choose its own agent municipal and adjoint. In 1800 this system was abandoned and Simpelveld got its own government again with its own maire (mayor).

After the fall of the First French Empire Simpelveld became part of the United Kingdom of the Netherlands. On 14 February 1818, by royal decree 95, a system of government for municipalities was introduced and Simpelveld got a schout (scout). On 23 July 1825, by royal decree 132, the name schout was changed to burgemeester (mayor), who had a term of six years.

In 1830 Belgium became independent, and from 1830 to 1839 Simpelveld would be de facto part of Belgium. On 28 October 1830 the provisional government of Belgium introduced its local government law that decided that the local notables were to choose their mayor. On 30 March 1836 the Belgian government introduced a permanent local government law, in which the mayor was appointed by the king for six years.

After the Treaty of London, Simpelveld became part of the Duchy of Limburg, a part of the German Confederation. The duchy was however also considered part of the Netherlands and Dutch laws applied. The mayor was appointed by the king for a term of six years.

Between 1940 and 1945 the Netherlands was occupied by Germany. From 1941 onwards the mayor took over all authority from the municipality council.

In 1982 the municipality of Bocholtz merged into Simpelveld.

Mayors of Dutch municipalities are appointed by the cabinet in the name of the monarch, with advice of the city council.

== List of mayors ==
Period	Name of Mayor	Party	Notes
1795–1799	J.F. Scheilen		agent municipal
1799–1813	J.Th. van Wersch		1799-1800 agent municipal, 1800-1813 maire
1813–1817	J. Daniels		maire
1817–1875	W. Brand		1817-1818 maire, 1818-1825 schout, 1825-1875 mayor
1875–1905	J.L.H. van Wersch		
1905–1923	L.H. Houbiers		
1923–1958	J.W.H. Houbiers		mayor of Bocholtz 1923-1958
1958–1968	W.E.A. Scheelen		
1969–1982	J.G.T. Bouwens	CDA	
1982–1993	Fons Teheux	CDA	
1993–1997	Peter Cammaert	CDA	
1998–2011	Hub Bogman	PvdA	
2011–present	Richard de Boer	VVD	
