= Molsberg =

Molsberg may refer to:

- Molsberg (Germany), a village in Germany
- Molsberg, a hamlet within Nochern, Germany
- Molsberg (Netherlands), a village in the Netherlands
