= Baneheide =

- Hamlet
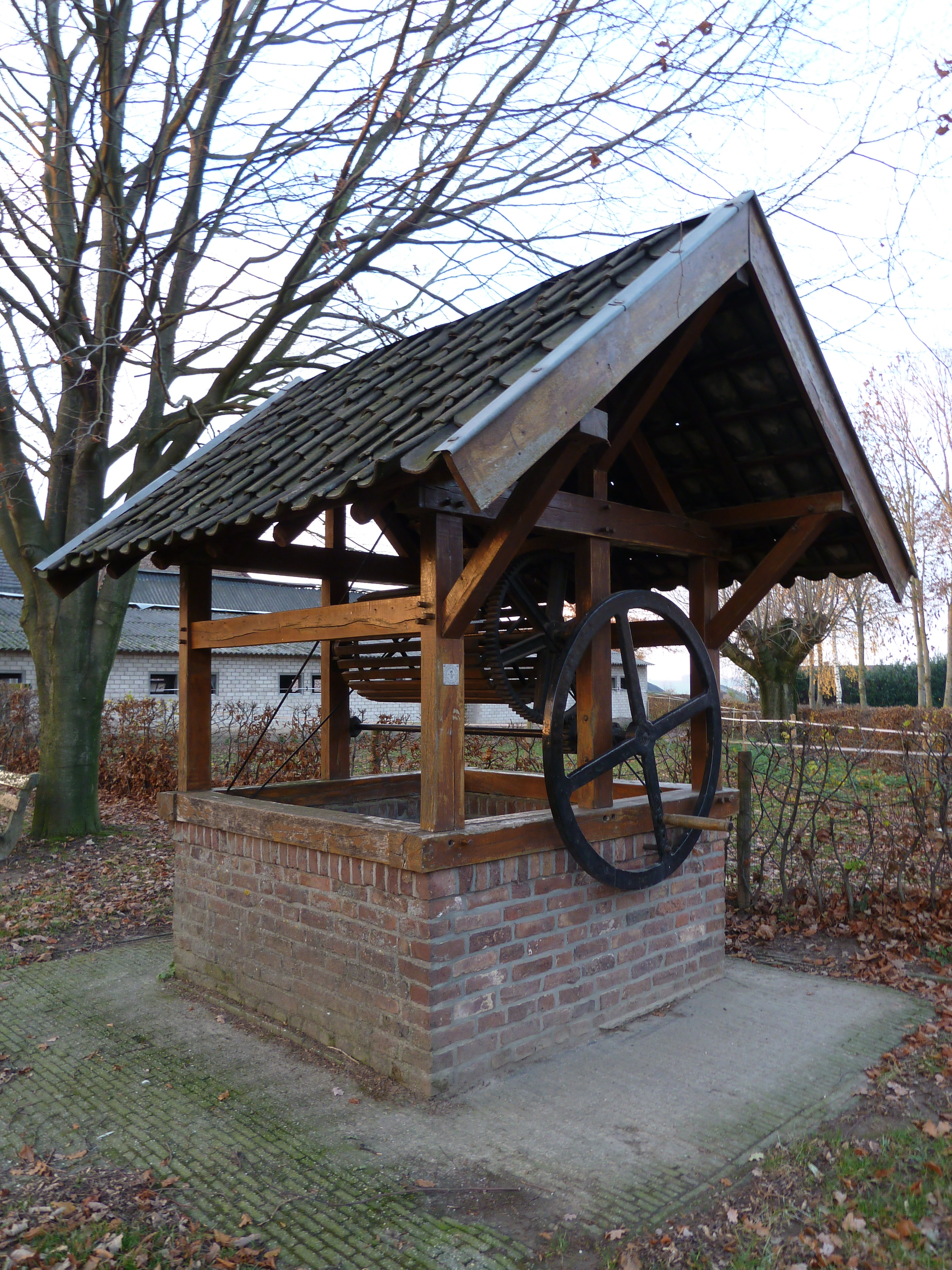

- Location in the Netherlands Location in the province of Limburg in the Netherlands
- Coordinates: 50°49′5″N 5°58′28″E
- Country: Netherlands
- Province: Limburg (Netherlands)
- Municipality: Simpelveld

Area
  - Total: 0.39 km^{2} (0.15 sq mi)
- Elevation: 173 m (568 ft)

Population (2021)
  - Total: 140
  - Density: 360/km^{2} (930/sq mi)
- Time zone: UTC+1 (CET)
  - Summer (DST): UTC+2 (CEST)
- Postal code: 6351
- Dialing code: 045

Baneheide (Dutch: [ˌbaːnəˈɦɛidə]; Ripuarian: De Boanhei [də boənˈɦɛi]) is a hamlet in the Dutch province of Limburg. It is a part of the municipality of Simpelveld, and lies about 9 km southwest of Kerkrade.

It was first mentioned in 1603 or 1604 as Baenenheidt, and means "cultivated heath".

== National monuments ==
Baneheide has four farms that have been designated national monuments.

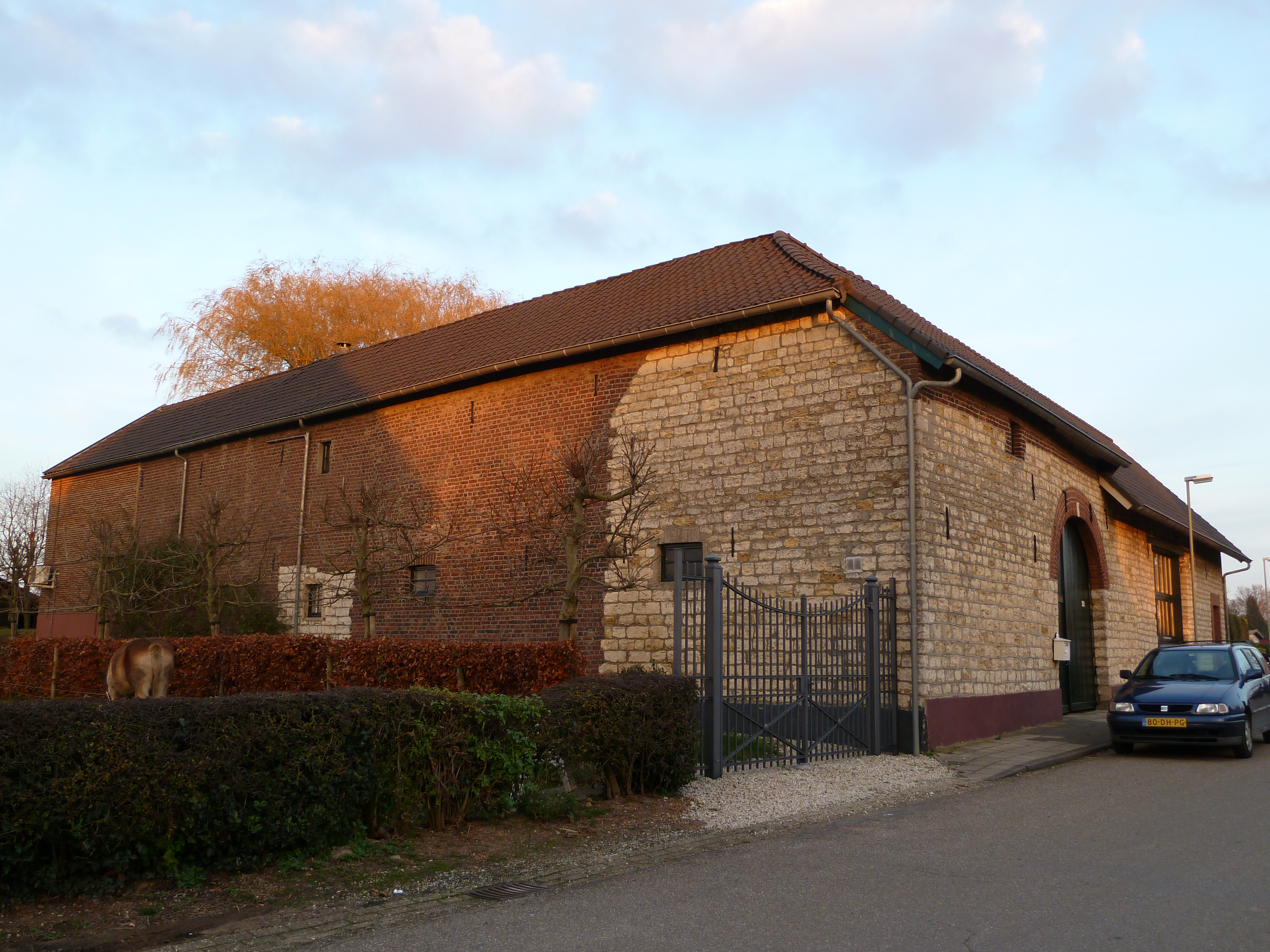
Baneheide 22

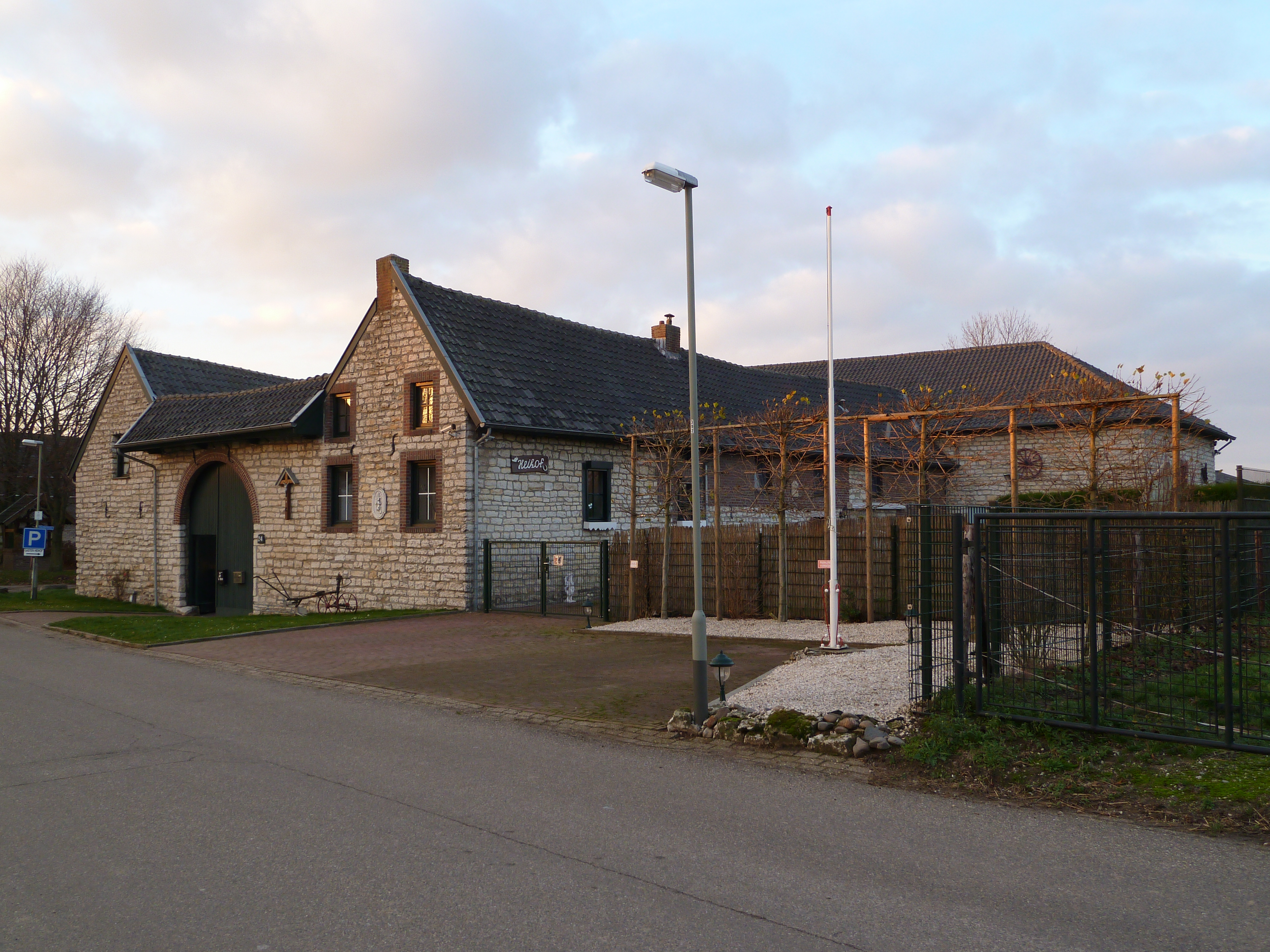
Baneheide 24

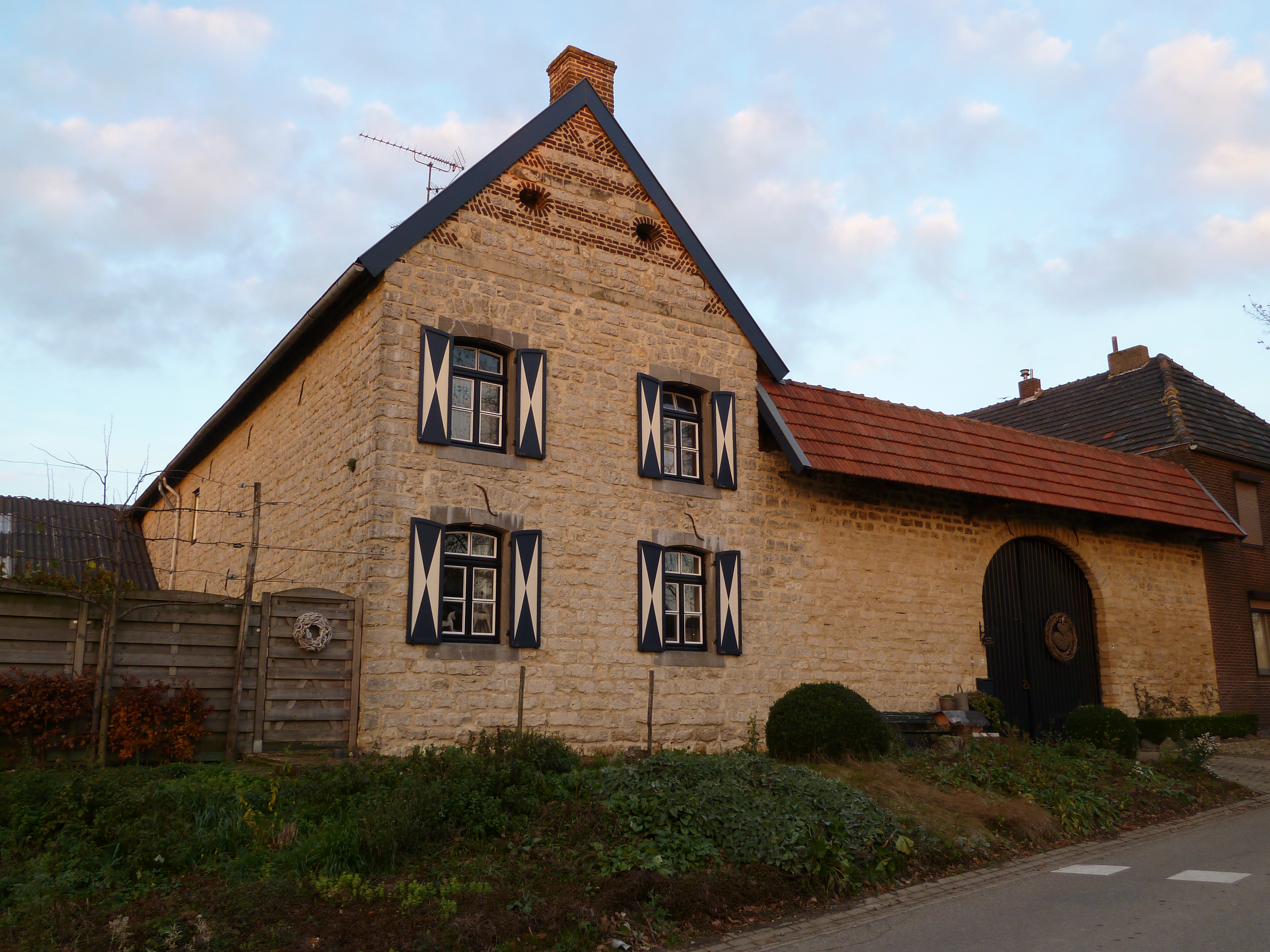
Baneheide 28

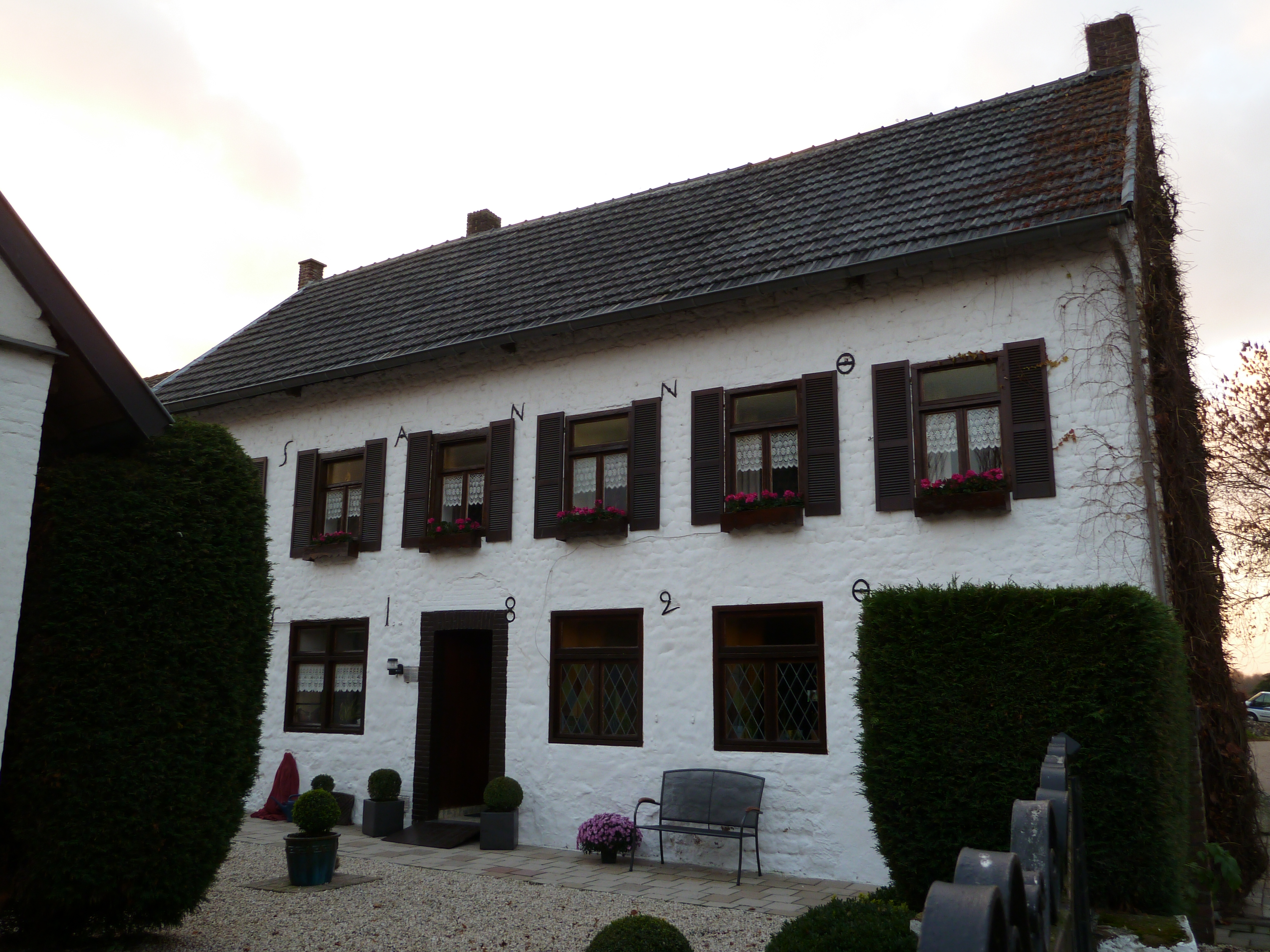
Baneheide 31
