= Step Vaessen =

Dutch broadcast journalist (born 1965)

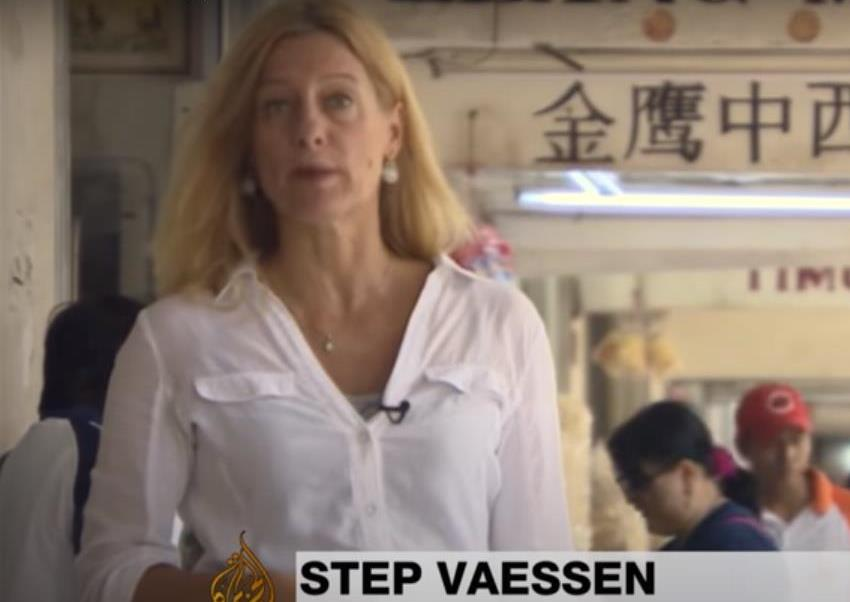
Step Vaessen (Indonesia, 2014)

Stephanie "Step" Vaessen (born 11 February 1965) is a Dutch broadcast journalist, currently working as a Berlin correspondent for Al Jazeera English.

== Early life ==
Vaessen is of Dutch origin and was born in Simpelveld in the province of Limburg, in 1965.

She graduated in psychology in Nijmegen and then took a postgraduate course in journalism in Tilburg. During her student years, she was involved in the Nijmegen squatter movement, and worked on the squatter radio-station Radio Rataplan.

== Career ==
Nederlandse Omroep Stichting

In 1994, she began working with the Nederlandse Omroep Stichting (NOS) news department. In 1996 she became the NOS Southeast Asia correspondent, based in Jakarta.

Al Jazeera

Vaessen moved to Al Jazeera English in 2006, when it was founded. She was based in Jakarta as the station's correspondent for Indonesia.

Guest appearances

On Sunday, August 7, 2011, she was the third guest for the 2011 season on the television programme Zomergasten on the Dutch channel VPRO. On 20 June 2012, she was the speaker for the Arondéus Lecture, to discuss the theme of intolerance in the Netherlands and attempts by politicians to limit free speech.

== Publications ==
- Jihad met sambal, August 2011 (Prometheus : Amsterdam). ISBN 9044615378
