= James the Greater Church =

- Jacobus de Meerderekerk
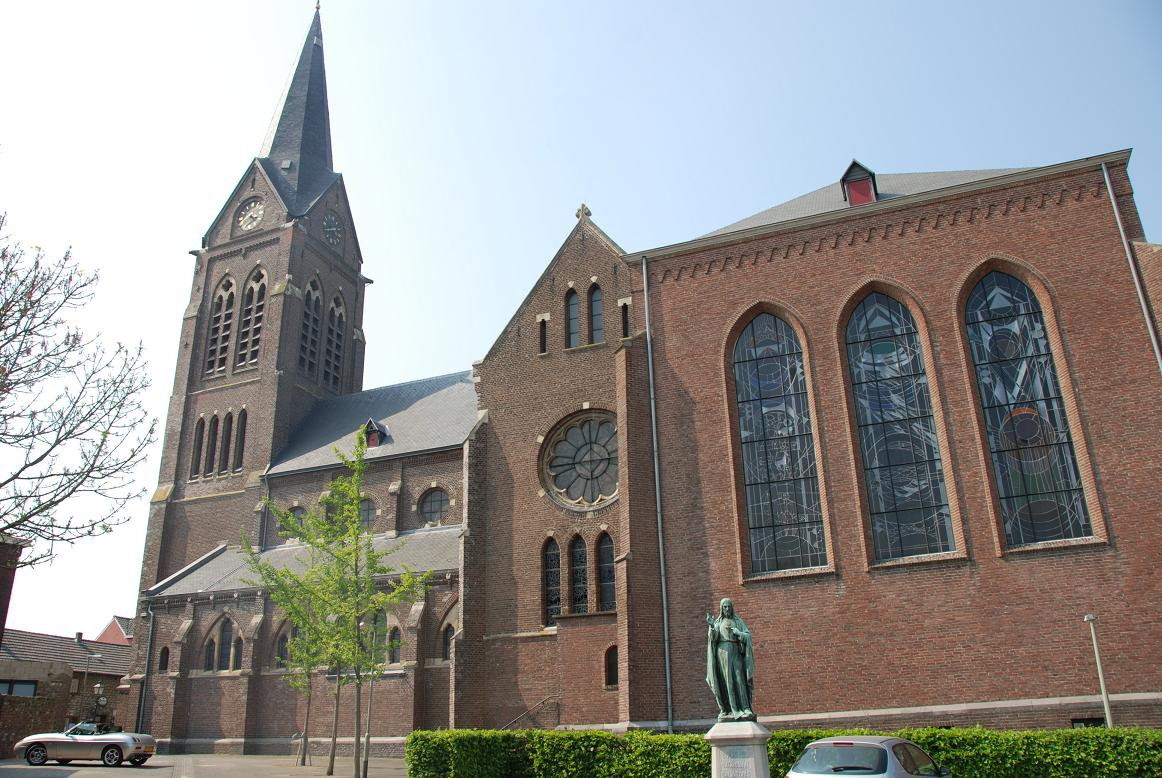
- James the Greater Church in 2007
- James the Greater Church
- 50.8182°N 6.0068°E
- Location: Pastoor Neujeanstraat 6; 6351 GK, Bocholtz
- Country: Netherlands
- Denomination: Roman Catholic
- Website: parochiesimpelveld.nl

History
- Status: Parish church
- Founded: 1873
- Dedication: James the Greater
- Events: 1953-1954: Choir extended

Architecture
- Functional status: Active
- Heritage designation: Rijksmonument (33600)
- Architect(s): Pierre Cuypers; Harry Koene
- Style: Neogothic
- Groundbreaking: 1869
- Completed: 1873

Specifications
- Materials: Brick

Administration
- Province: Utrecht
- Diocese: Roermond
- Deanery: Kerkrade
- Parish: Saint James the Greater parish, Bocholtz

The James the Greater Church (Dutch: Jacobus de Meerderekerk) is a Roman Catholic church, located on the Pastoor Neujeanstraat 6 in Bocholtz, Netherlands. First mentioned in the 14th century, the current church was built in 1869 by Pierre Cuypers. It was extended by Harry Koene in 1953, creating a larger choir, and adding an apse and sacristy. The building has been in continues use as a parish church for the Bocholtz saint James the Greater parish since 1873. The church holds a relic of Pope Cornelius, which was subject of a yearly pilgrimage during the early and mid 20th century, and was listed as a national monument in 1967.

== History ==
The first mention of a chapel in Bocholtz dates from 1373, which was part of the parish of Simpelveld in the diocese of Liège. This chapel was built near a local guest house for pilgrims traveling between Aachen and Santiago de Compostela. Archeological evidence of earlier buildings on this location was found during work on the clergy house in 1953, when the foundations were found of a single nave building dating back to the 12th century, surrounded by foundations of a larger building from the late Middle Ages. Mass for the people in Bocholtz was the responsibility of the parson from Simpelveld, which was a common cause for dissatisfaction. Records from 1487 describe a request for the bishop of Liege to rebuild the chapel dedicated to James the Greater in Bocholtz, which was granted as long as mass was taken in Simpelveld. In 1559 Simpelveld and Bocholtz became part of the diocese of Roermond when Philip II of Spain reorganised the dioceses in the Netherlands.

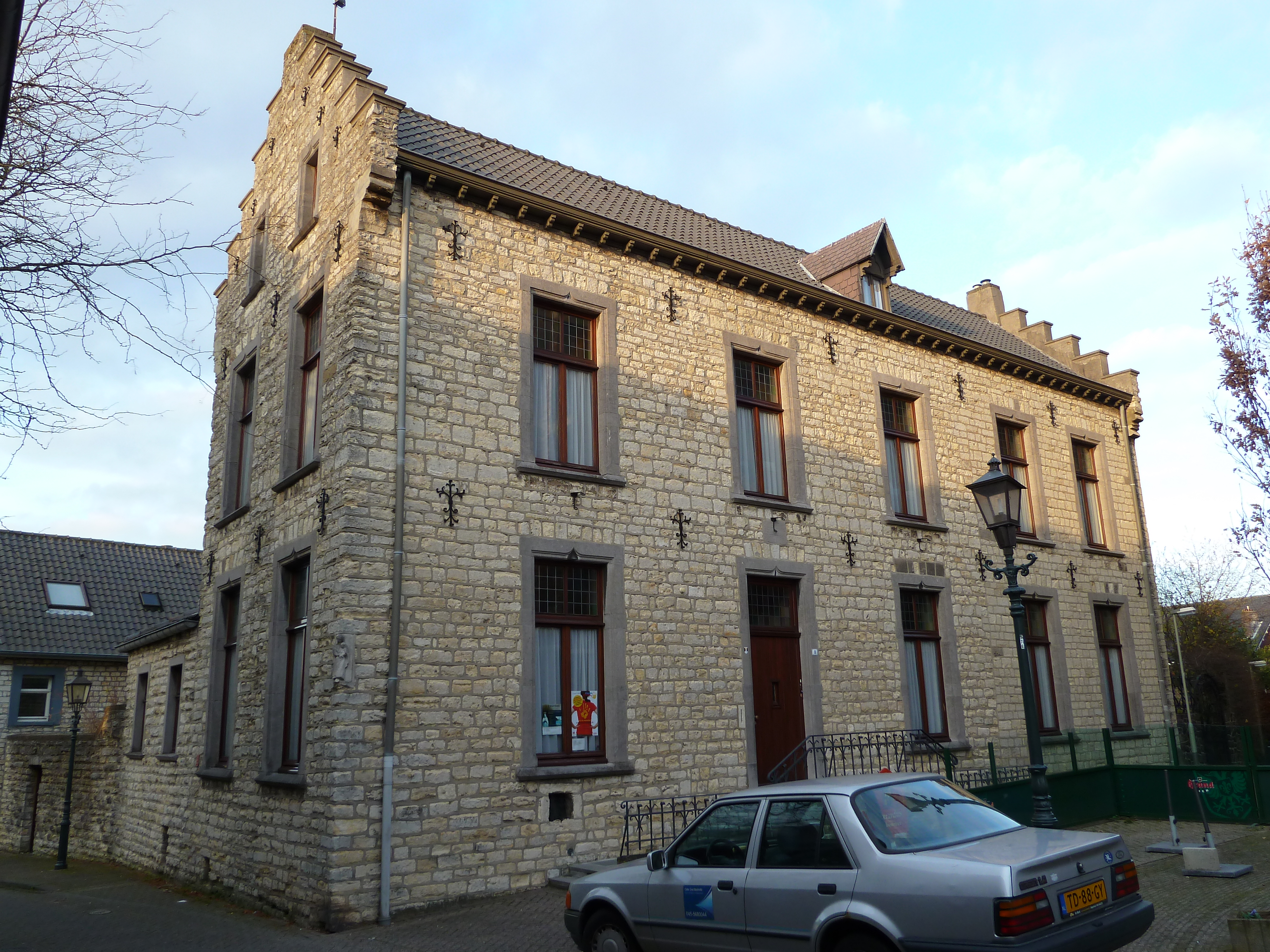
Clergy house

During the 17th century the chapel came into disrepair, and was completely rebuilt from 1696 to 1697. The parson from Simpelveld refused to consecrate the new chapel or give mass. In 1714 a priest from Aachen was the first to hold mass in the chapel. In 1794 the Southern Netherlands were occupied by France and eventually annexed. By law all priests had to take an oath of fidelity. Parson Augustinus Sougnez of Simpelveld refused to take the oath and fled to Dortmund afraid of being arrested. He returned in 1795, to find that another parson had temporarily taken his place, but had not sufficiently attended to Bocholtz. In 1794 Bocholtz had formed its own parish, the saint James the Greater parish, under parson Jean Benedictus Dautzenberg, meaning Bocholtz was no longer part of the parish of Simpelveld. In 1794 Bocholtz also became an independent municipality. In 1796 a clergy house was built north of the church, and after a long period of procedures the parish was eventually recognised in 1803, making the local chapel its parish church.

Due to population growth the old church was taken down and a new and larger parish church was built on the same location by Pierre Cuypers between 1869 and 1873. The design was based on an unused design for a church in Baarlo. During the 19th and 20th century the population of Bocholtz increased, and the church was considered to be too small. Between 1953 and 1954 the choir was taken down and a new larger choir was built by Harry Koene, also adding an apse and sacristy.

== Description ==
The church stands in the center of Bocholtz, and follows liturgical orientation, with the choir facing east and the main entrance in the bell tower on the west. The tower adjoins a small square in the west, which it shares with a detached clergy house north west of the church. In the far west behind the square is the churchyard. To the north is a wide sidewalk, with a parking space at the east side, and a green space with a Sacred Heart statue to the south. Besides the main entrance there are side entrances on both sides of the church and an entrance in the back to the sacristy.

It is a neogothic cross shaped church made of brick, with the original 1869 design using a different color brick from the 1953 extension. The 1869 church has a tower in the west, three naves, a transept and a choir. Connected to the original choir is the extension from 1953, which stands wider than the original transept. The extension includes a second transept, and a new choir, with a sacristy attached to the northeast.

A turret projects from the left of the main entrance, standing against the main tower, with a wooden road cross against the outside turret wall.

Around 50 stained glass windows, with two rose windows above the main entrance and one on both sides of the original transept.

== Inventory ==
A black marble baptismal font from 1796 and a wooden wayside cross against the church tower.

== Relic ==
The church holds a relic, in the form of a bone fragment, of Pope Cornelius. The relic holder is a silver-white neo-gothic metal monstrance of 33,5 centimetre height, with a round theca of about 4 centimetre diameter, which contains the bone fragment. The backside of the theca holds a red wax seal, around which the words Elenchi Dioecesi Brugenni 22.052 are written in pencil. It is not certain when the relic was acquired. Worship of Cornelius spread through Europe during the 7th to 10th century when his relics were taken to Germany, with the main center of worship at Kornelimünster Abbey in Aachen, just over the border from Bocholtz.

During the 19th and 20th century worship of Cornelius became popular in the Dutch provinces of North Brabant and Limburg, and the James the Greater parish acquired a statue of Cornelius. The statue is a wooden neo-gothic 132 centimetre high statue of a beardless young man in mass vestment wearing a tiara, with his right hand holding a horn and his left hand a staff. The statue stands against a column in the back of the church, on the right side of the center nave, just below the rood screen. on a neo-gothic corbel, on which the words St. Cornelius are written.

In the early 20th century a yearly pilgrimage to Bocholtz was held on Cornelius' feast day of 16 September. The first mention of a pilgrimage dates from the 1930s, though it is argued that this might have existed since around 1900. People would travel in small groups on foot from Vijlen via Mamelis and the Bocholtzerheide to the James the Greater Church, where the statue of Cornelius would be on display on the choir. On Sundays during the octave a children's blessing would be given to children from the region. During the 1960s the pilgrimages stopped. The regional popularity of the children's blessing would continue through the 1970s, eventually diminishing and only drawing local attendance.

== Monument ==
In 1903 the Dutch government created a national committee to document its monuments. Starting in 1908 the committee published a series of books called 'Preliminary list of Dutch monuments of history and art' (Dutch: Voorloopige lijst der Nederlandsche monumenten van geschiedenis en kunst ). Each book described a province and the book about Limburg was published in 1926. The James the Greater Church was amongst six listed monuments in Bocholtz, with a specific mention for several pieces of its inventory.

Starting in 1937 the preliminary lists were followed by a series of books called 'The Dutch Monuments of History and Art' (Dutch:De Nederlandse Monumenten van Geschiedenis en Kunst). The book about South Limburg was published in 1962. The James the Greater Church was listed, again with specific mention of several pieves of its inventory. A wayside cross, which was moved from its original location to the church tower and a gable stone on the clergy house were listed separately.

In 1961 the Dutch parliament passed a law on monuments, replacing a temporary law from 1950. The church was listed as a national monument (nr 33600) on 16 January 1967. Two pieces of inventory were specifically mentioned, namely a black marble baptismal font from 1796 and a wooden wayside cross against the church tower. The clergy house was listed as a separate monument on 24 January 1984.

== Church choir ==
The Church Choir Saint Joseph (Dutch: Kerkelijk Zangkoor St. Joseph) was founded on 1 March 1865 under the French name Société Chorale St.Joseph. Originally only for men, it became a mixed choir in 1953, and had around 60 members in 2015. The choir has performed across Europe, most notable the Deutscher Sängerbund invited the choir to Berlin in 1964, and in 1992 the choir had an audience with Pope John Paul II, and sang in the St. Peter's Basilica and the Church of Saints Michael and Magnus. After the 1992 performance in Rome a group called Sympathisers of Church Choir Saint Joseph (Dutch: Sympathisanten Kerkelijk Zangkoor St. Joseph) was created. It consists of around 40 people who do not sing in the choir, but pay contribution and are invited to events. Best known for its Missa Luba, of which it has performed over 250 concerts since 1960, the choir celebrated its 150-year existence in 2015 with several guest choirs singing in the James the Greater Church, including a performance by the Aachen Cathedral Choir.

== Modern day ==
Since Bocholtz is part of the Deanery of Kerkrade, and the local archive guaranteed conservation and proper access, the Bocholtz parish archives are held in the municipal archives of Kerkrade.

== See also ==
- Saint Remigius Church, in Simpelveld

== Literature ==
- Margry, Peter Jan; Caspers, Charles (2005). Bedevaartplaatsen in Nederland: Provincie Limburg (in Dutch). Uitgeverij Verloren BV. ISBN 9789065505682.
- Van der Werf, Jo (2012). Simpelveld en Bocholtz door de ogen van Arnold Dydden, pastoor 1571-1616 (PDF) (in Dutch). Heemkundevereniging De Bongard Simpelveld-Bocholtz. ISBN 9789080588301.
- Stenvert, Ronald; Kolman, Chris; van Ginkel-Meester, Saskia; Broekhoven, Sabine; Stades-Vischer, Elisabeth; Venner, Jos (2003). Monumenten in Nederland. Limburg. Rijksdienst voor de Monumentenzorg (in Dutch). Zwolle: Zeist / Waanders Uitgevers. ISBN 9789040096235.
- Oosthoek, A. (1926). Voorloopige lijst der Nederlandsche monumenten van geschiedenis en kunst. Deel VIII, I. De provincie Limburg (Amby-Meer) (in Dutch). Den Haag: Staatsdrukkerij- en Uitgeverij.
- Van Agt, J.F. (1962). De Nederlandse Monumenten van Geschiedenis en Kunst in de Provincie Limburg / geïllustreerde beschrijving. Deel V De provincie Limburg, Derde stuk: Zuid-Limburg, uitgezonderd Maastricht (in Dutch). Den Haag: Staatsdrukkerij- en Uitgeverij.
