= Bosschenhuizen =

Coordinates: 50°50′10″N 5°57′38″E

Bosschenhuizen Busjehoêze
- Village
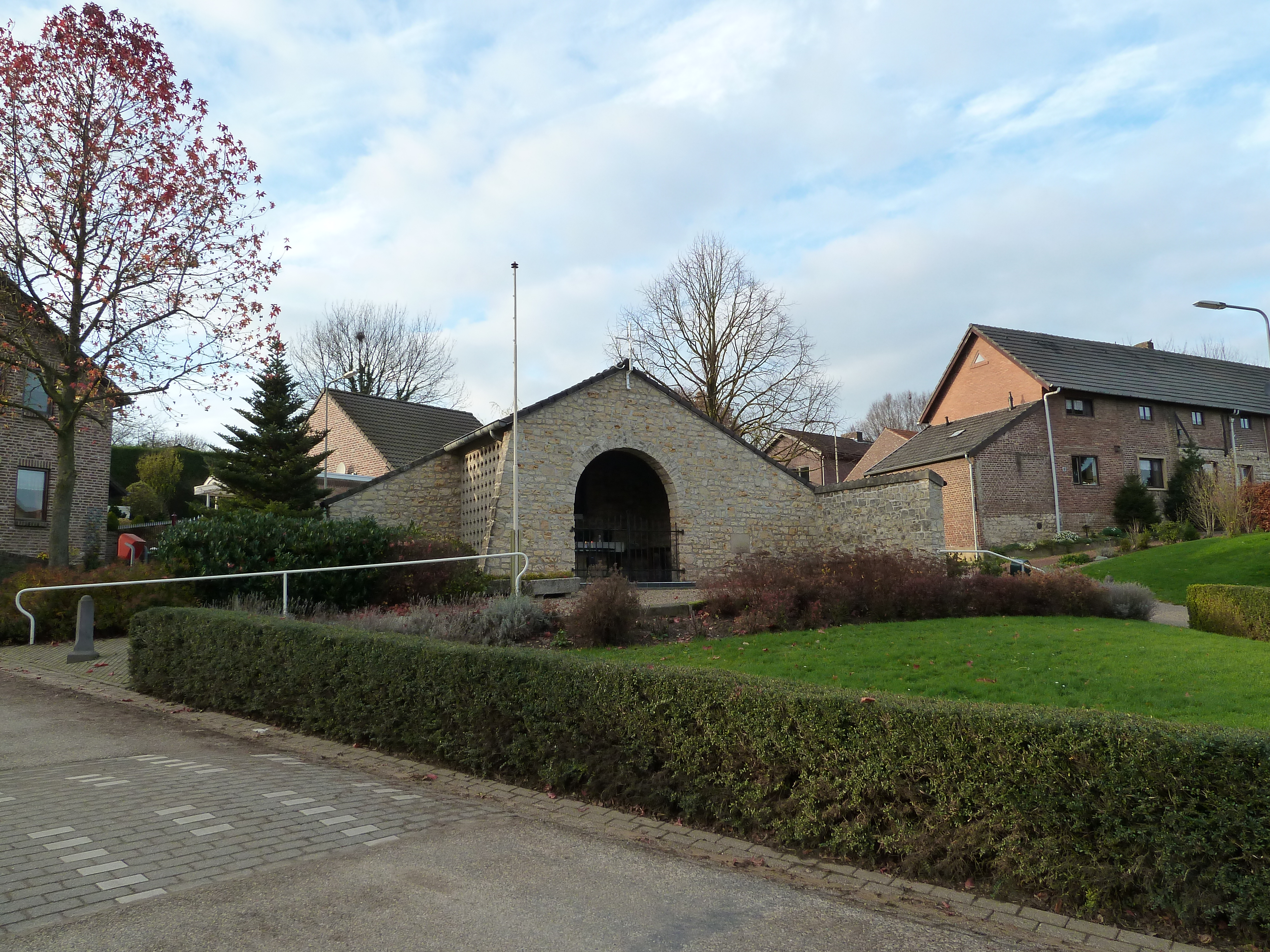
- Sacred Heart Chapel

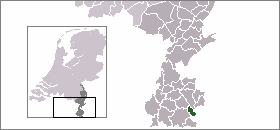
- Country: Netherlands
- Province: Limburg
- Municipality: Simpelveld

Population (2016)
  - Total: 80
- Time zone: UTC+1 (CET)
  - Summer (DST): UTC+2 (CEST)

Bosschenhuizen (Limburgish: Busjehoêze) is a hamlet in the southeastern Netherlands. It is part of the municipality of Simpelveld in the province of Limburg, about 20 km east of Maastricht. The village lies southeast of Trintelen and west of Simpelveld. In 2016, the village had an estimated population of 80.

== Etymology ==
In the Middle Ages, the village was referred to as Buschenhaus, Busgenhusen (1378) and Busscherhousen (1454). Bosschenhuizen comes from the words "huizen" meaning settlement, and "bosschen" meaning in the forest.

== History ==
The land around Bosschenhuizen only became developed in the Late Middle Ages. This was an area of no more than one or two farms and the surrounding area. It remained an agricultural region until the late 20th century. In 1840, Bosschenhuizen was made up out of 28 houses and had a population of 118. In 2016, it was made up out of 30 houses and had a population of 80.

== Culture ==
Bosschenhuizen contains three national heritage sites. A farm at Bosschenhuizen 20 which was built in 1759, a farm at Bosschenhuizen 21 from 1773, and a wayside cross at Bosschenhuizen 13 from the first half of the 19th century. At a crossroad in the centre of the village, lies the Sacred Heart Chapel. This chapel was built in 1958 and designed by A.F. Brenninkmeyer on the location of an older chapel from 1923. Prior to the latter chapel, there had been several wayside crosses at this location. In 2016, the village had five wayside crosses.

== Gallery ==
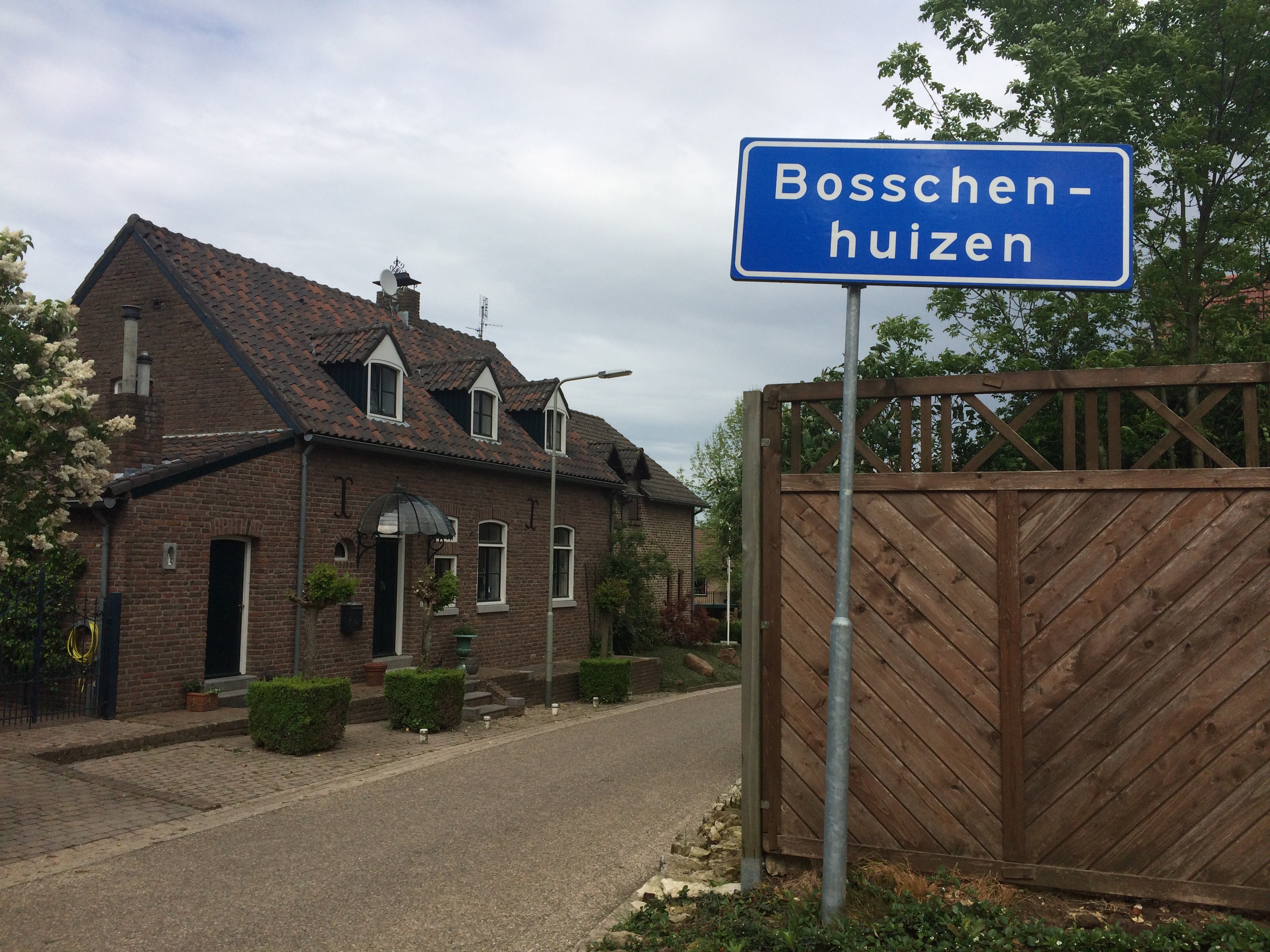
Entry sign on the road from Trintelen

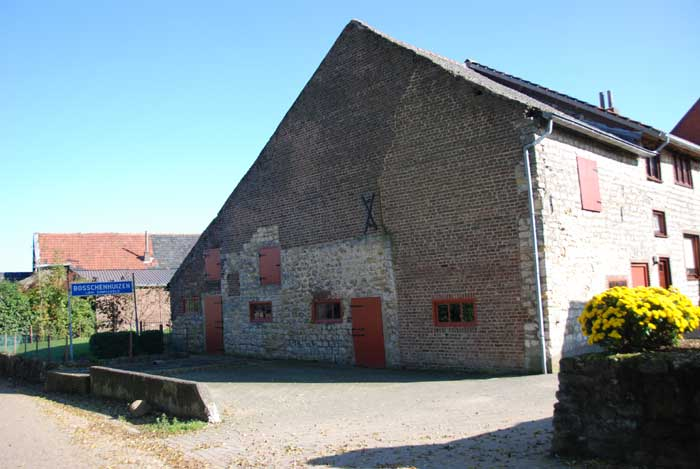
Farm and old entry sign on the road from Trintelen

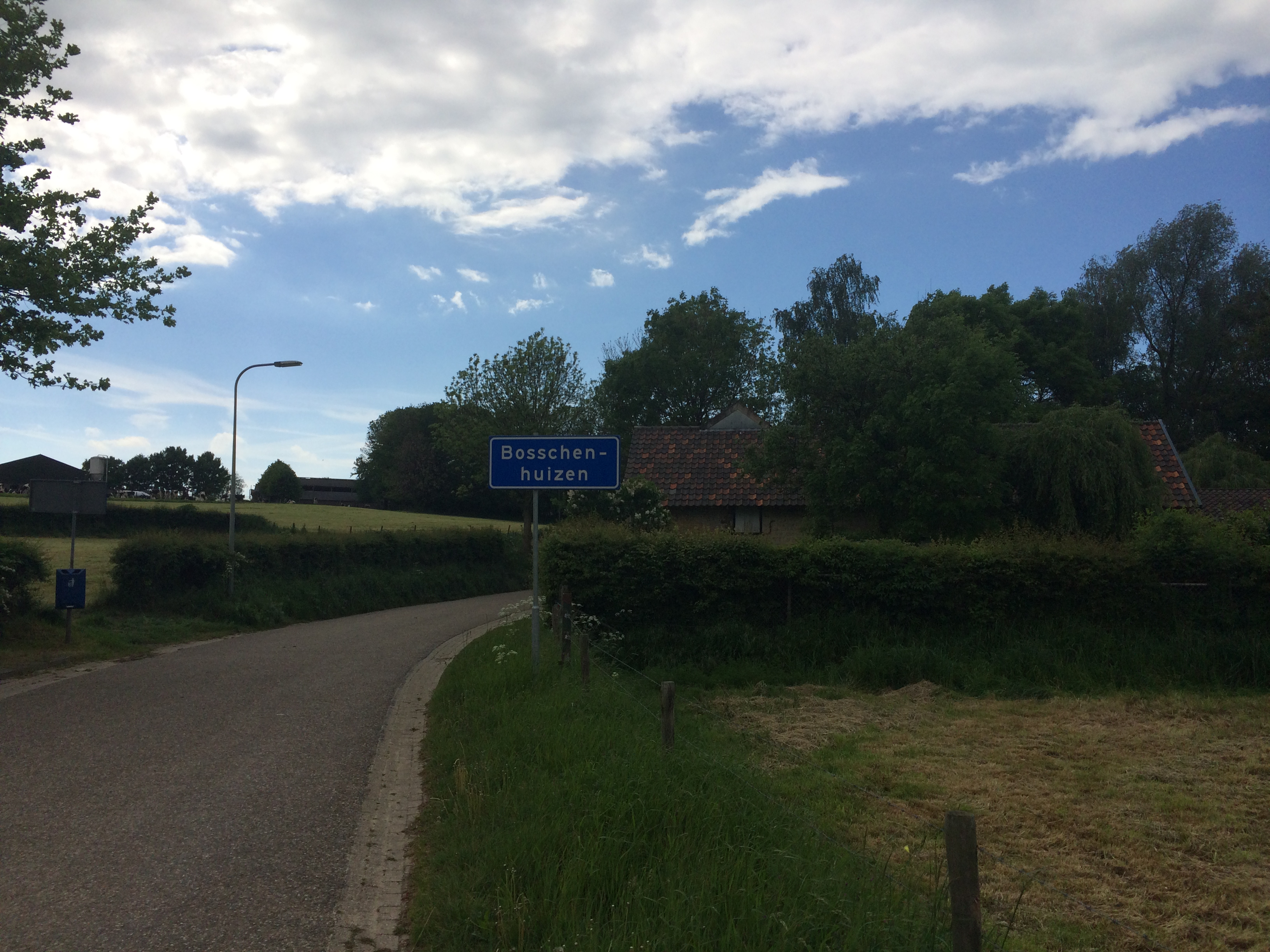
Entry sign on the road from Simpelveld

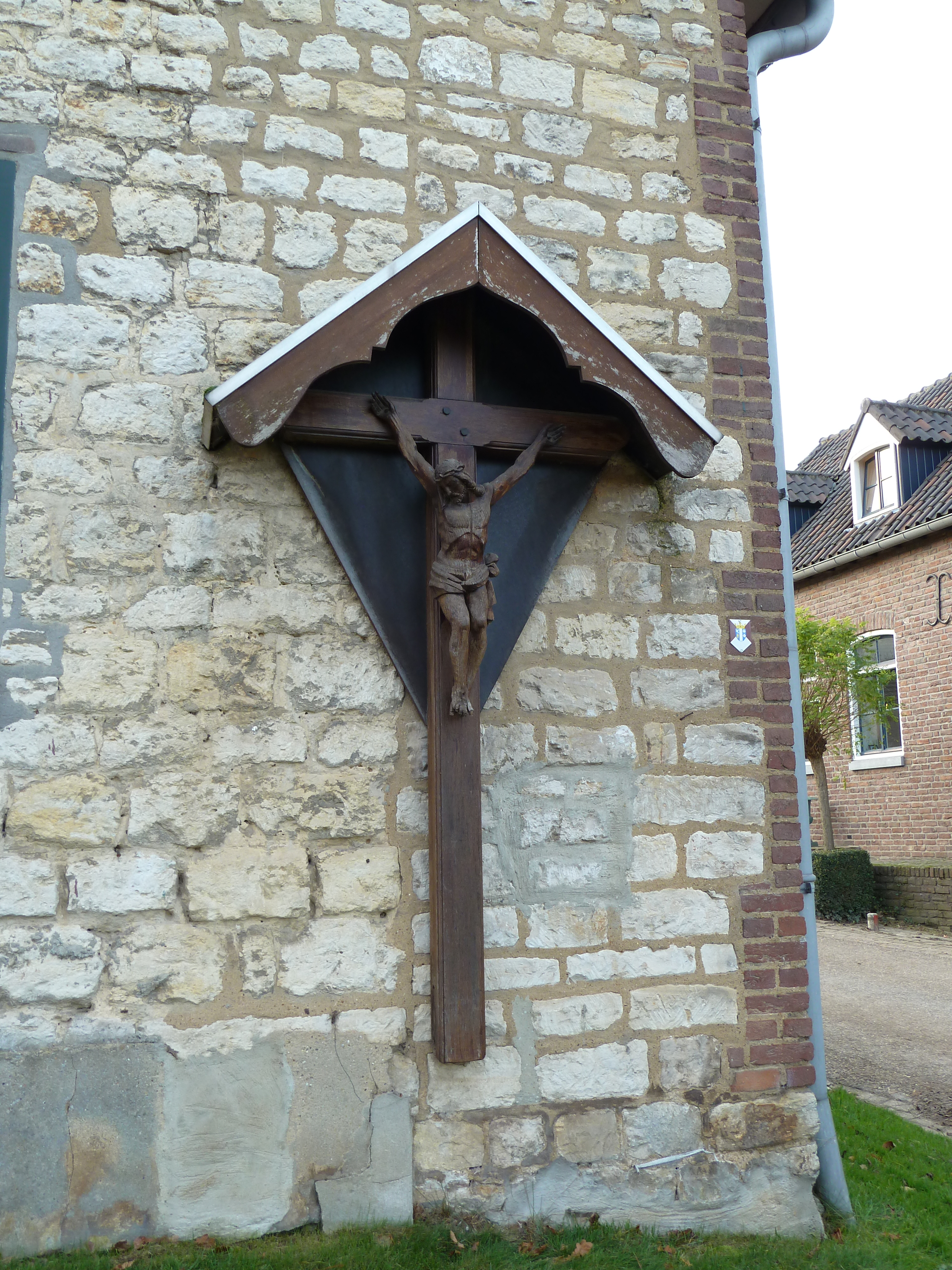
Monumental wayside cross, at Bosschenhuizen 13

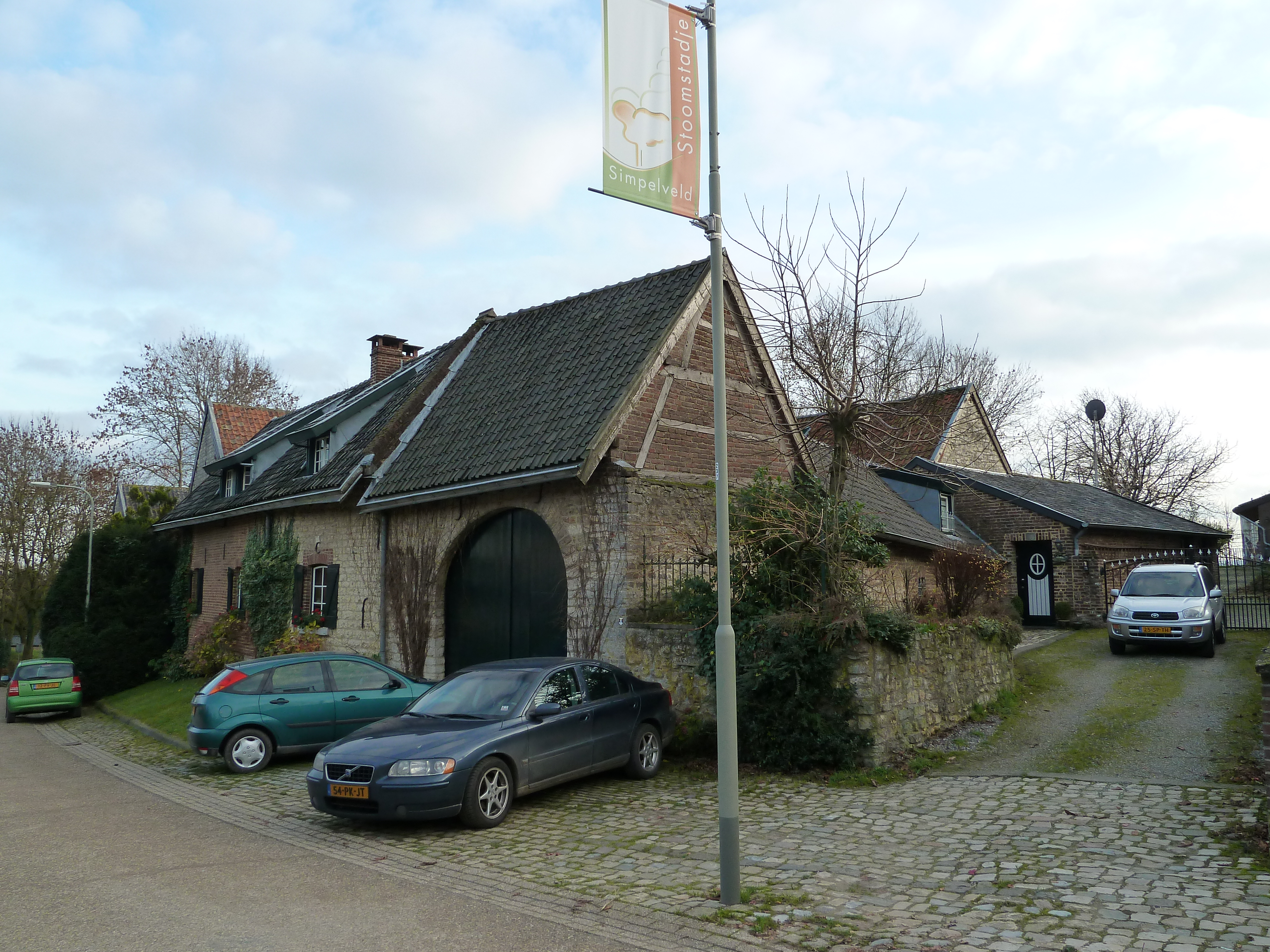
Monumental farm at Bosschenhuizen 20

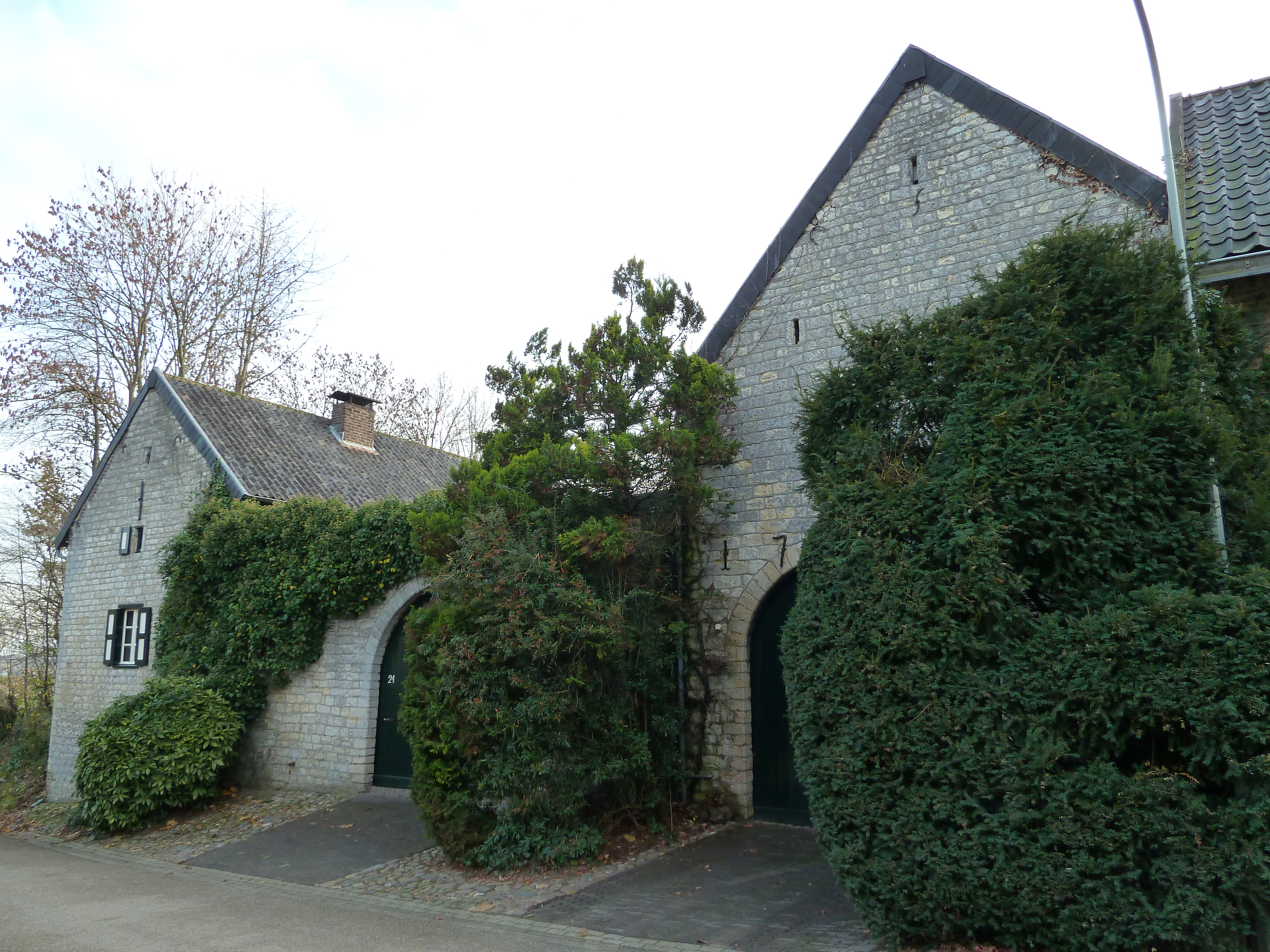
Monumental farm at Bosschenhuizen 21
