= Molsberg, Netherlands =

Coordinates: 50°50′28″N 5°59′11″E

Molsberg
- Village
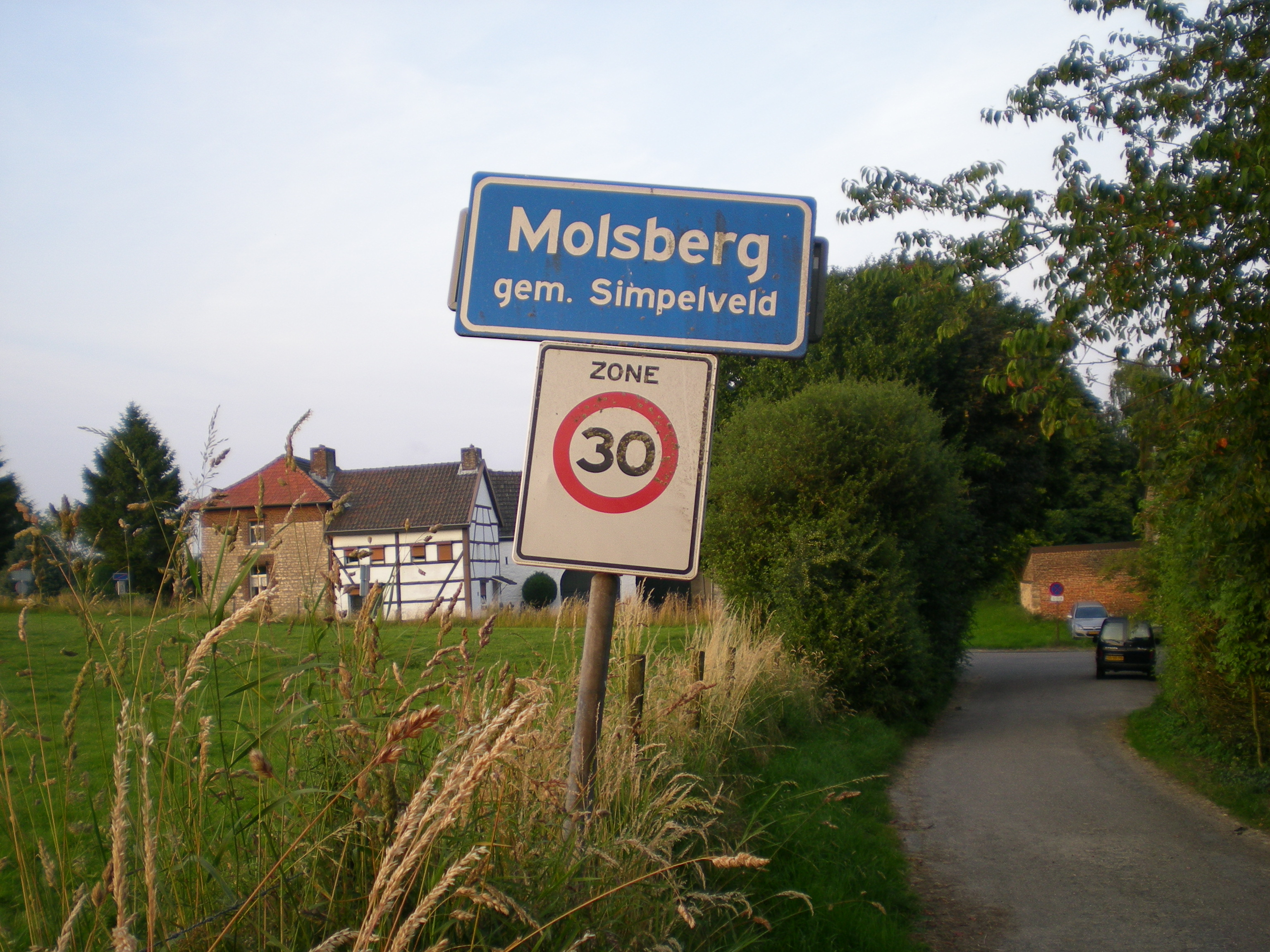

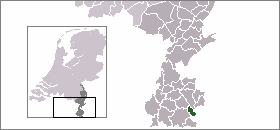
- Country: Netherlands
- Province: Limburg
- Municipality: Simpelveld

Population
  - Total: 300
- Time zone: UTC+1 (CET)
  - Summer (DST): UTC+2 (CEST)

Molsberg (Dutch pronunciation: [ˈmɔlzbɛr(ə)x]) is a hamlet in the southeastern Netherlands. It is located close to the village of Simpelveld in the municipality of Simpelveld, Limburg, about 20 km east of Maastricht. The village has a population of 300 people after it was expanded with 54 new houses in 2004.

The name Molsberg refers to the hill (berg) it is built on and to the Mols family. Molsberg is also the name of the hill the village is built on. This hill goes up to 212m with an average incline of 4% and is part of the Amstel Gold Race.

The farm located at Molsberg 96 dates from 1732 and has been designated a national monument.

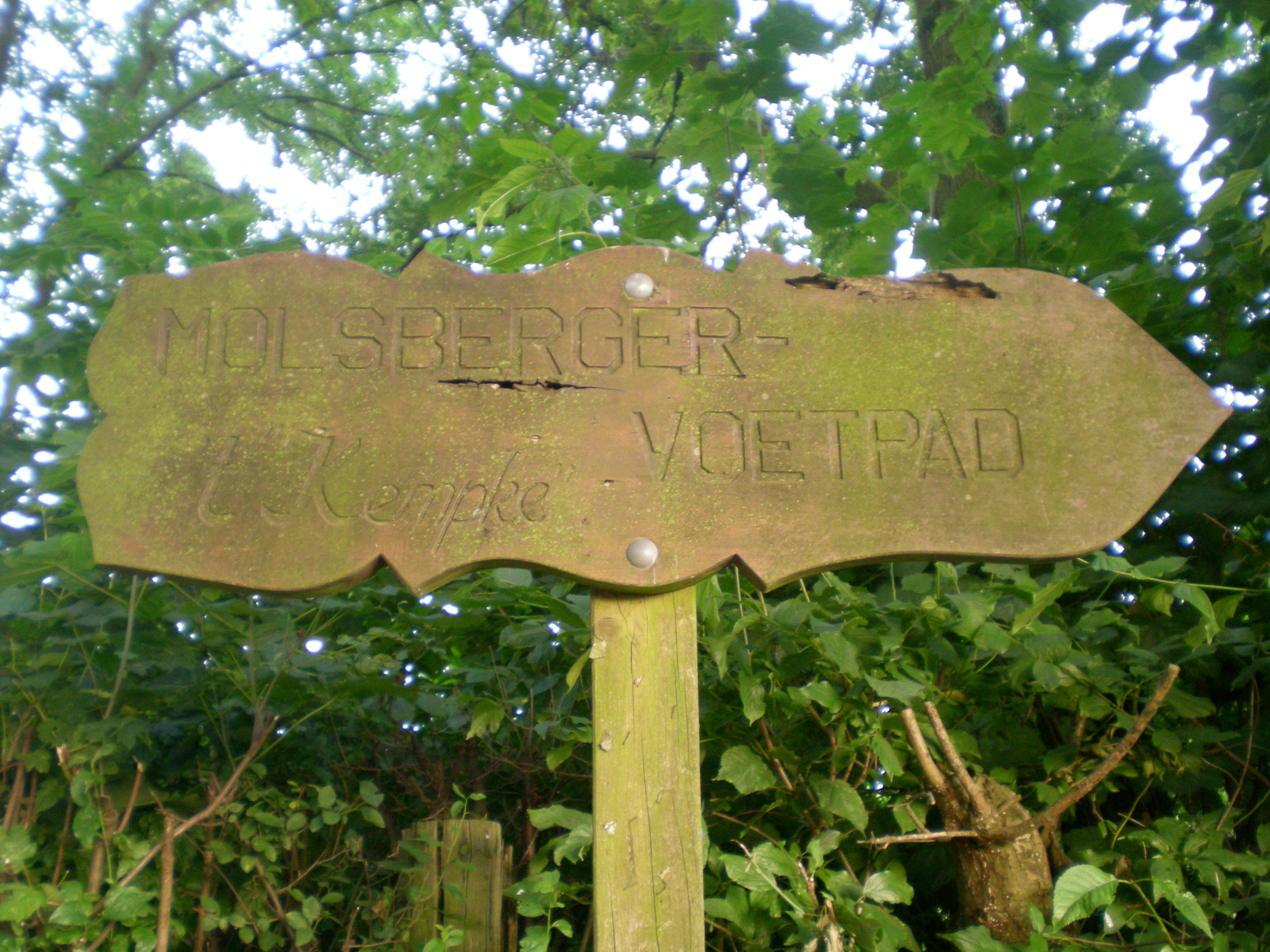
Pedestrian road 't Kempke

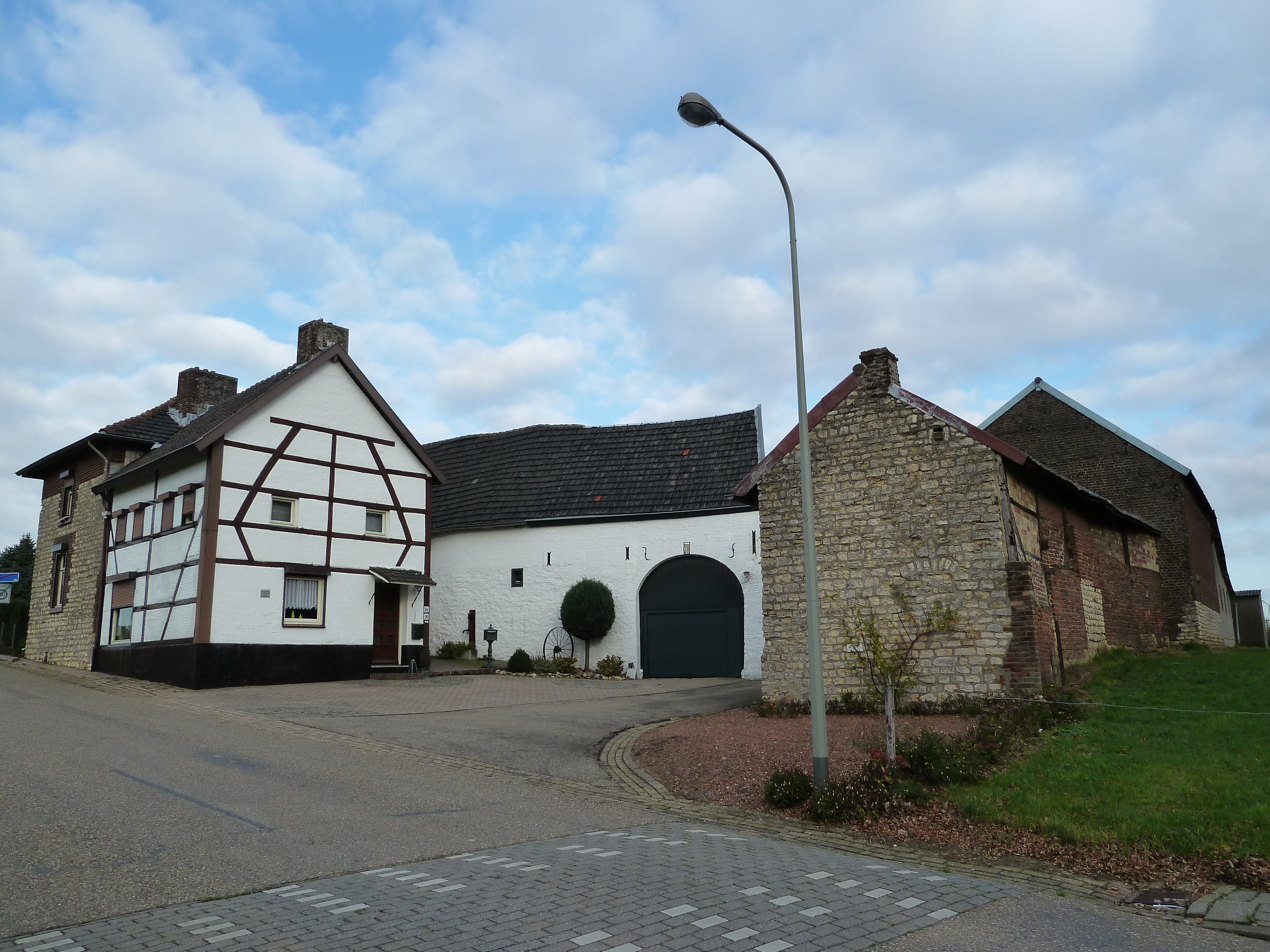
Molsberg 96
