= Simpelveld =

Simpelveld Zumpelveld
- Municipality
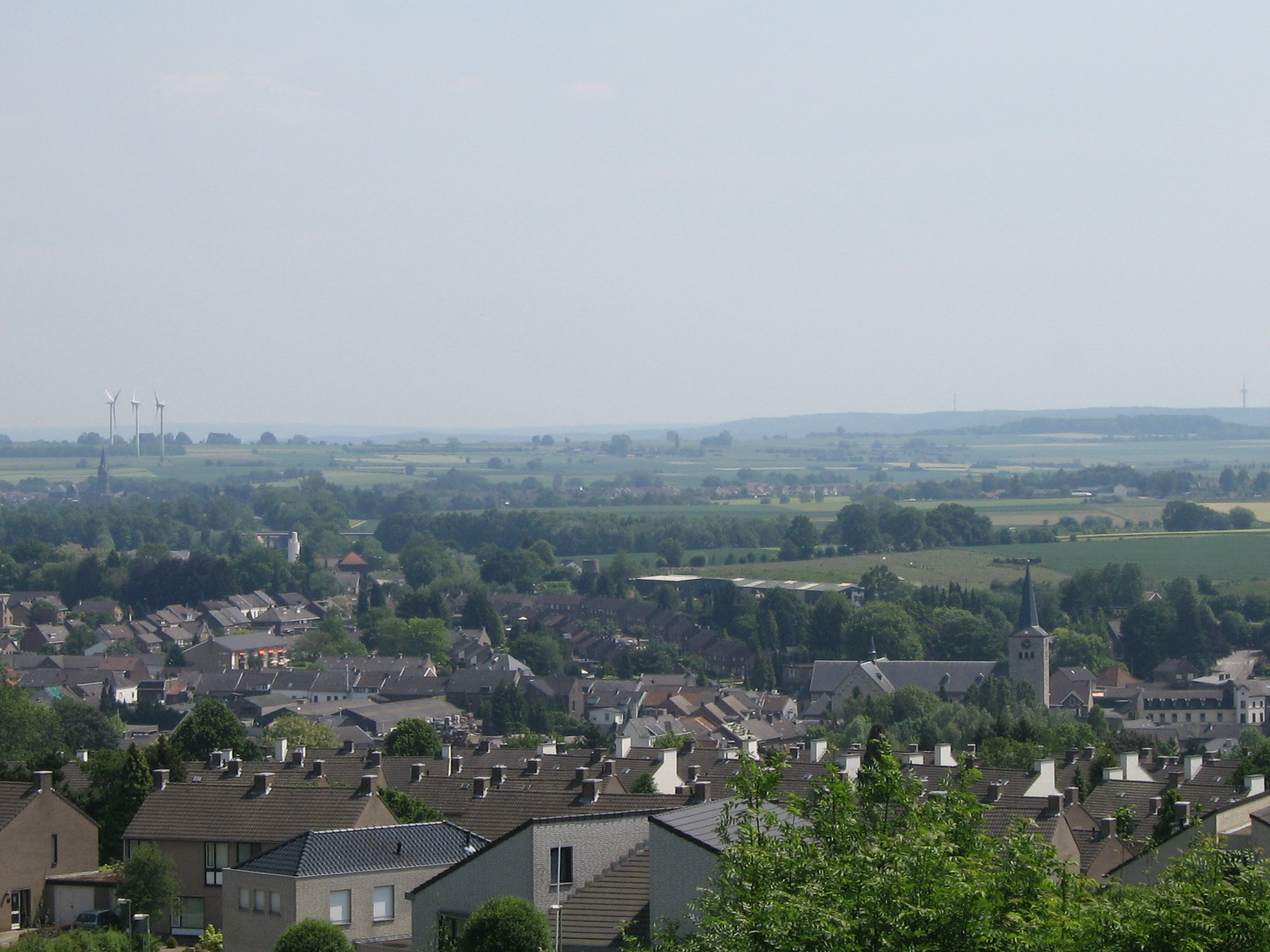
- Skyline of Simpelveld

- Flag Coat of arms

- Location in Limburg
- Coordinates: 50°50′N 5°59′E
- Country: Netherlands
- Province: Limburg

Government
  - Body: Municipal council
  - Mayor: Richard de Boer (VVD)

Area
  - Total: 16.03 km^{2} (6.19 sq mi)
  - Land: 16.03 km^{2} (6.19 sq mi)
  - Water: 0.00 km^{2} (0 sq mi)
- Elevation: 138 m (453 ft)

Population (January 2021)
  - Total: 10,477
  - Density: 654/km^{2} (1,690/sq mi)
- Demonym: Simpelvelter
- Time zone: UTC+1 (CET)
  - Summer (DST): UTC+2 (CEST)
- Postcode: 6350–6353, 6369
- Area code: 045
- Website: www.simpelveld.nl

Simpelveld (Dutch pronunciation: [ˈsɪmpəlˌvɛlt]; Limburgish: Zumpelveld [ˈzʏm˦pəlˌvælt˦]) is a municipality and a town in the southeastern Netherlands. It is part of the municipal cooperative unit Parkstad Limburg.

Simpelveld is part of the Mergelland, named after the presence of chalk (mergel), hill country popular with tourists. The Mergellandroute passes through the town.

The population centre of Simpelveld has 28 national monuments, amongst which are the Oude Molen and the Saint Remigius Church. Simpelveld has a heritage railway station and is the home base of the South Limburg Railway Company. On one weekend in October there is a Day Out with Thomas from the children's television series Thomas and Friends.

== Population centres ==
- Bocholtz
- Simpelveld

Besides these official centres there are other hamlets which fall under the municipality:

- Baaks-Sweijer
- Baneheide
- Bocholtzerheide
- Bosschenhuizen
- Broek
- Bulkemsbroek
- In de Gaas
- Huls
- Molsberg
- Prickart
- Vlengendaal
- Waalbroek
- Zandberg.

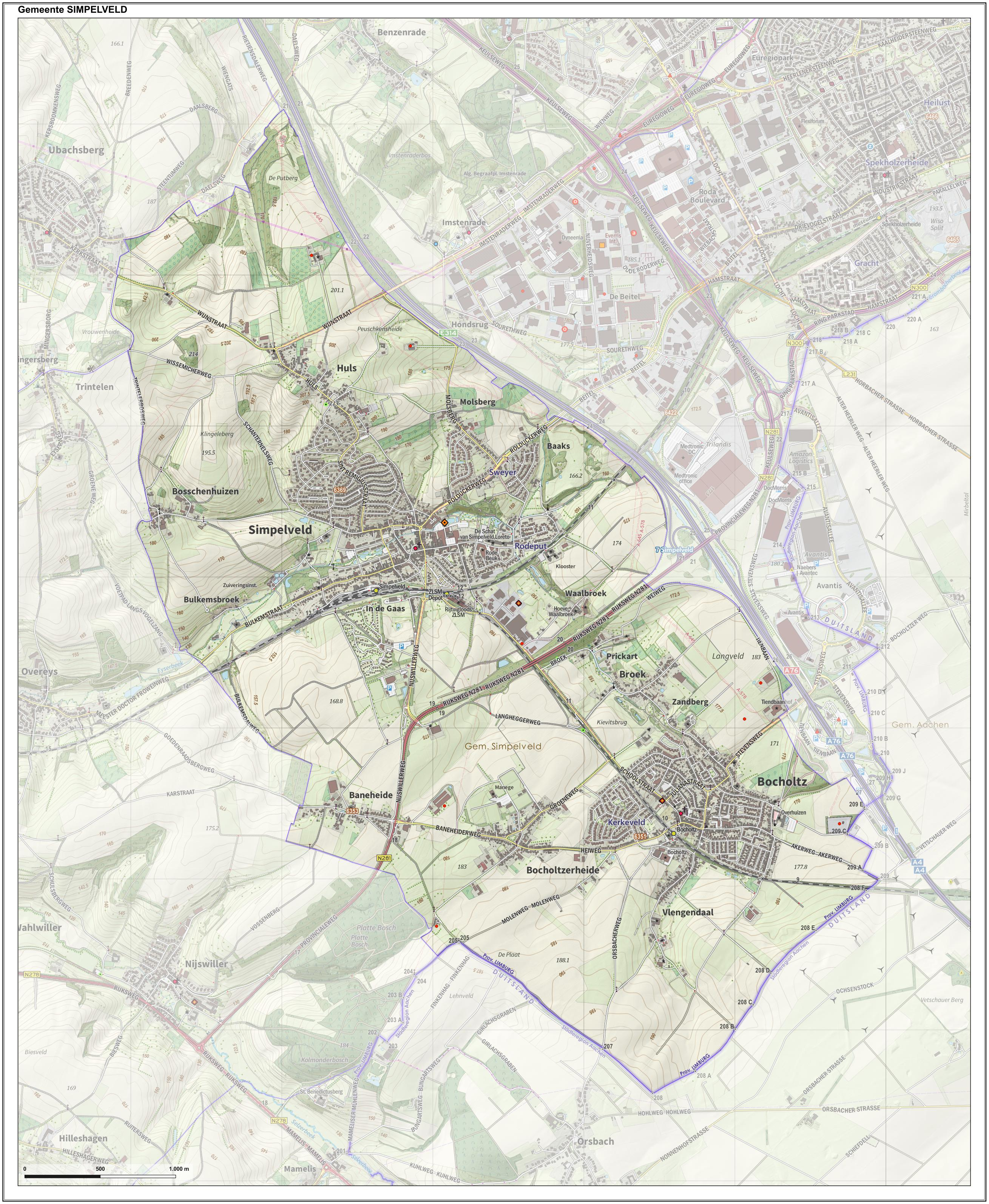
Dutch topographic map of the municipality of Simpelveld, June 2015

=== Religion ===
The municipality has two churches within its borders:

- James the Greater Church in Bocholtz
- Saint Remigius Church in Simpelveld

The city also has two monasteries, these are

- the Loreto monastery and
- Huize Damiaan, which has been home to The International Butler Academy since 2015.

== Regional language ==
Simpelveld is part of The Netherlands and therefore the official language is Dutch. A lot of people also speak Simpelvelds, a regional language that depending on the definition belongs to Ripuarian or Limburgish. It is also referred to as Southeast Limburgish.

== Notable people ==
- Step Vaessen (born 1965) a Dutch broadcast journalist, currently working as a Moscow correspondent for Al Jazeera English
- Ralph Hamers (born 1966) a Dutch businessman, the chief executive officer (CEO) of UBS Group
- Jolanda Jetten (born 1970, Simpelveld) a Dutch social psychologist and academic

== See also ==
- List of mayors of Simpelveld

== Gallery ==
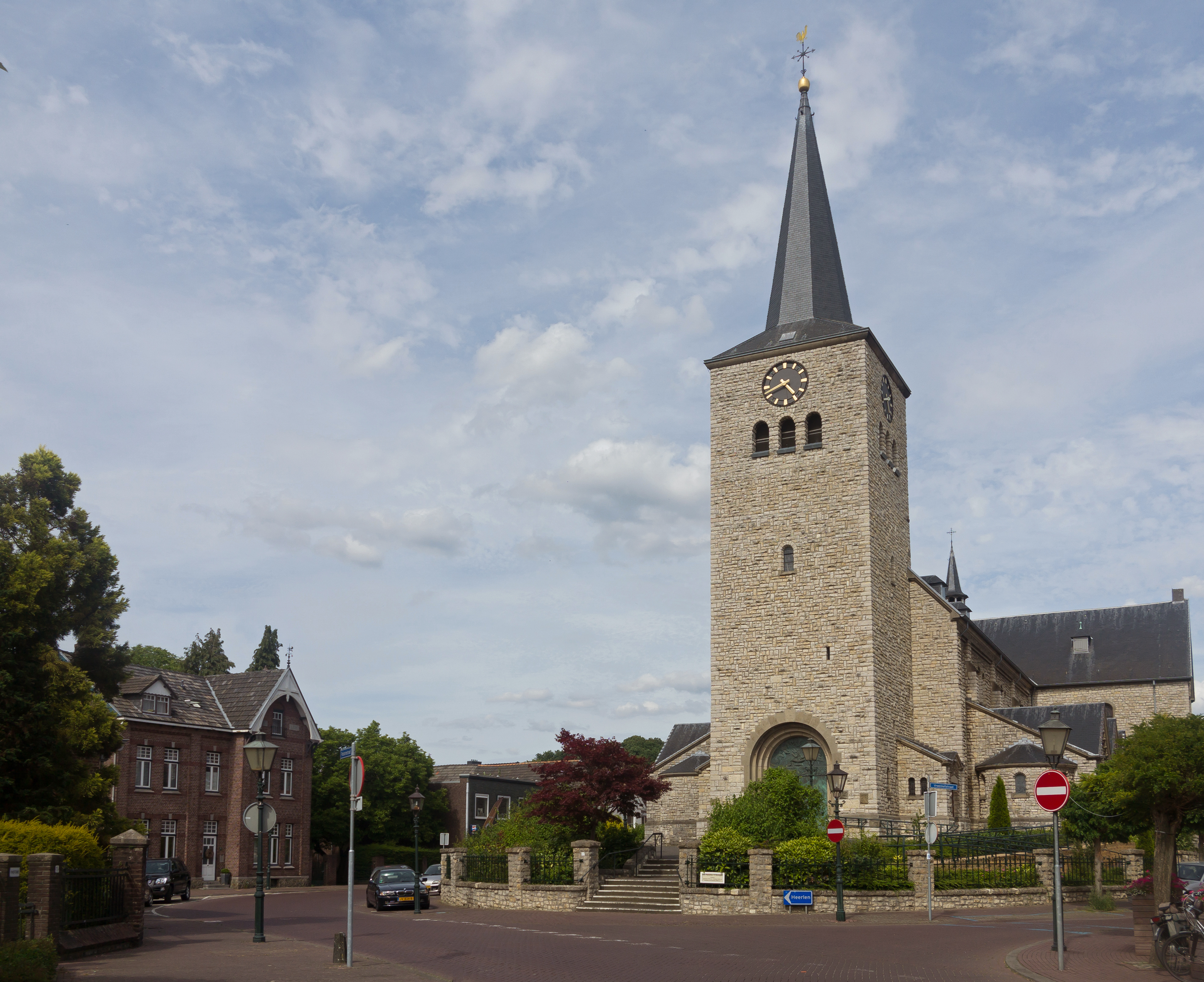
Saint Remigius Church

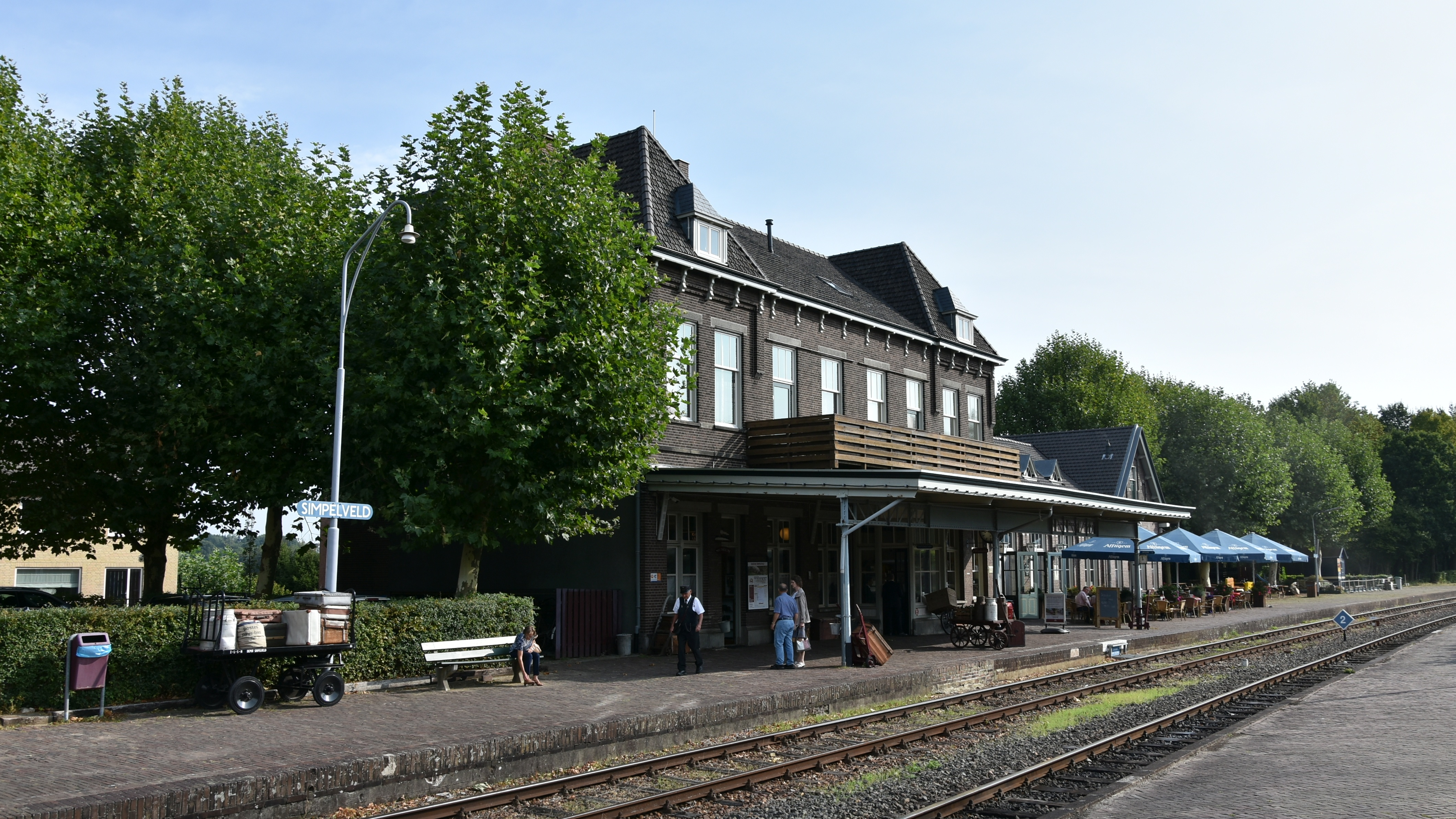
Station Simpelveld

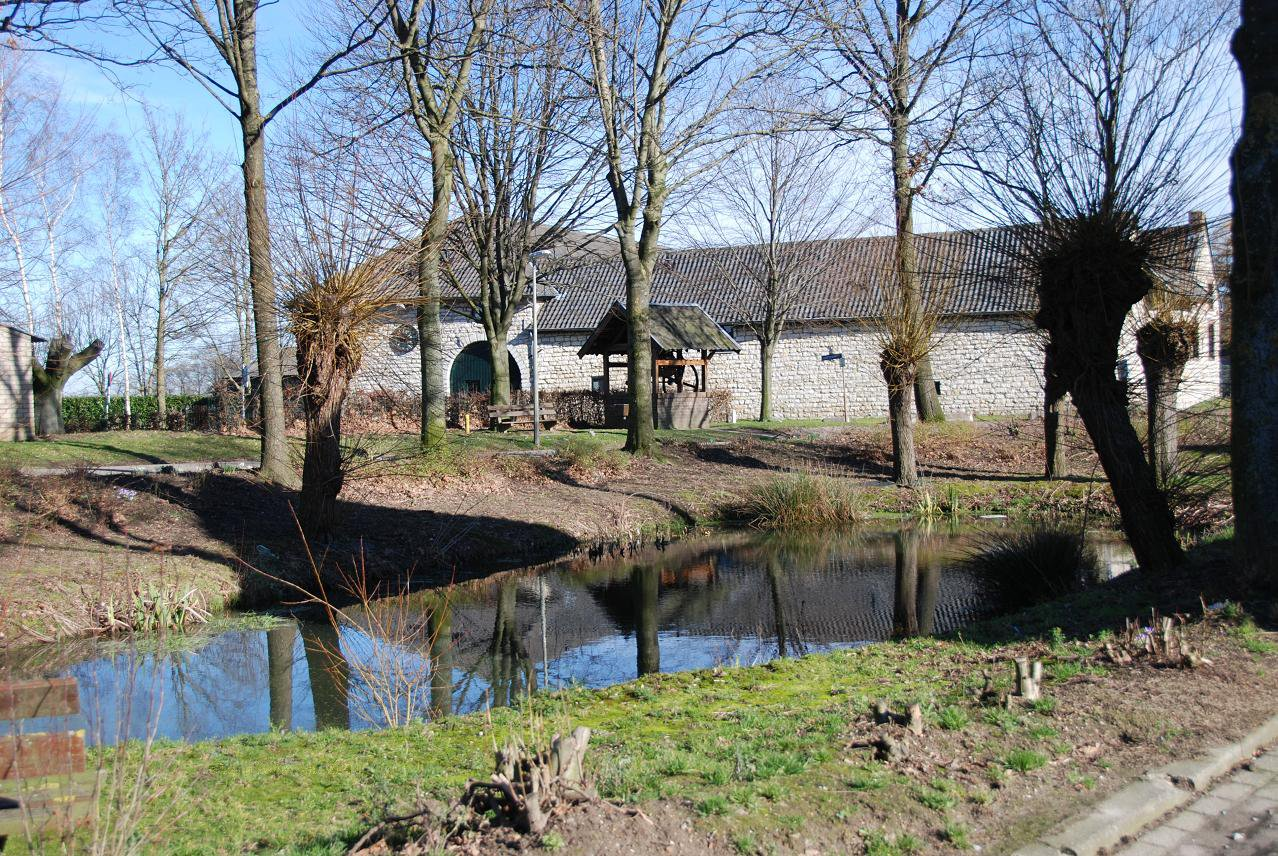
Limburgs, De Boanhei

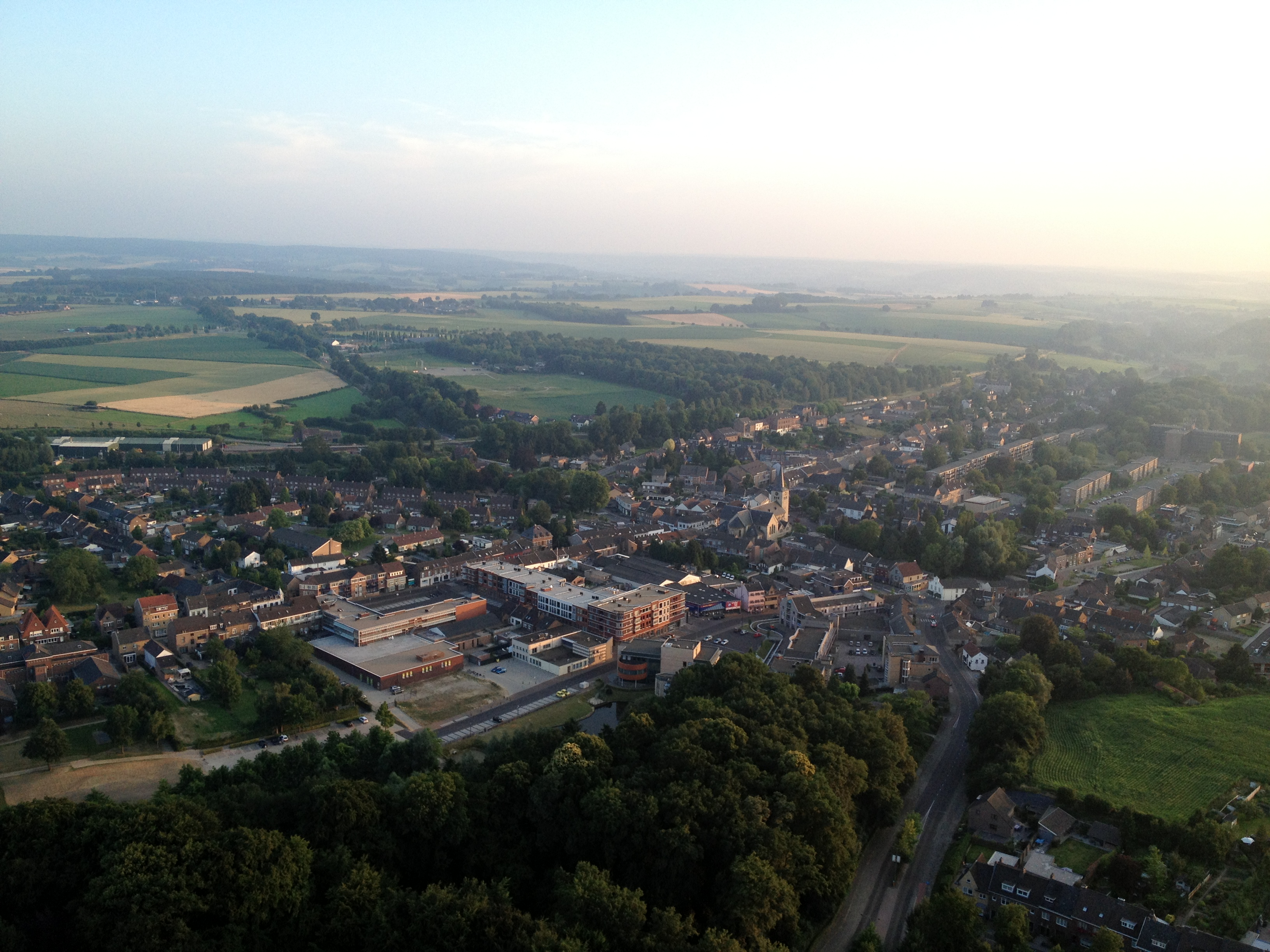
Aerial view of Simpelveld
