= Bocholtz =

Bocholtz Bóches (Ripuarian)
- Town
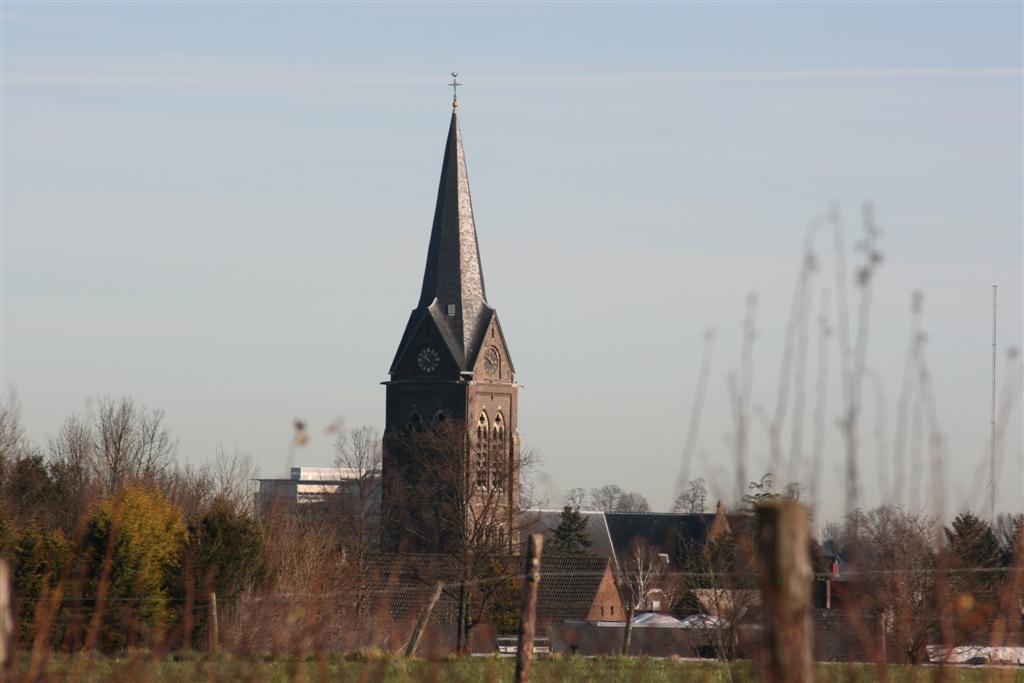
- The church in Bocholtz as seen from the Orsbacherweg

- Location in the Netherlands Location in the province of Limburg in the Netherlands
- Coordinates: 50.8193°N 6.0057°E
- Country: Netherlands
- Province: Limburg
- Municipality: Simpelveld

Area
  - Total: 9.30 km^{2} (3.59 sq mi)
- Elevation: 25 m (82 ft)

Population (2021)
  - Total: 3,730
  - Density: 401/km^{2} (1,040/sq mi)
- Time zone: UTC+1 (CET)
  - Summer (DST): UTC+2 (CEST)
- Postal code: 6085
- Dialing code: 0475

Bocholtz (Dutch: [ˈbɔxɔlts]; Ripuarian: Bóches [ˈbʊχəs]) is a town in the Dutch province of Limburg. It is a part of the municipality of Simpelveld, and lies about 7 km southwest of Kerkrade. Until 1982, it was a separate municipality.

== History ==
Bocholtz dates back to the Roman era. A Roman villa was found in the Vlengendaal, a street of Bocholtz, in 1911. A farmer plowing his land found a Roman sarcophagus in October 2003.

== Architecture and buildings ==
=== Castle De Bongard ===
The Castle De Bongard dates from the 16th century. The current building only represents 1/4 of the original building. The rest was destroyed during the invasion by the French during the Napoleonic Wars.

=== Hoeve Overhuizen ===
Hoeve Overhuizen is a fortified farm with roots dating back as far as the 13th century.

In 2015, Rabobank moved in after redecorating the interior of the building to make it their regional headquarters.

=== Church ===
The James the Greater Church was built between 1869 and 1873 by architect Pierre Cuypers. Construction workers expanding the church in 1953 found the remains of a building from the late medieval period on the same site. The patron saint of the church is St. James, son of Zebedee.

== Regional language ==
Bocholtz is part of the Netherlands and therefore the official language is Dutch. Many people also speak Bocholtzer, a Southeast Limburgish dialect that is linguistically Ripuarian but commonly perceived as a Limburgish dialect.

== Gallery ==
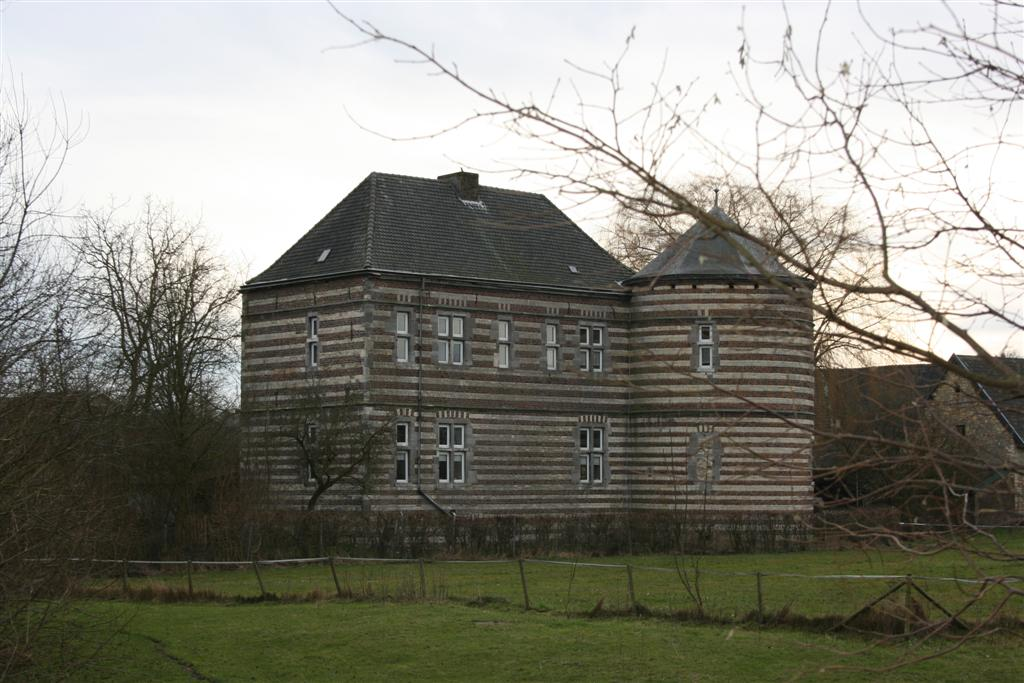
Castle De Bongard, Bocholtz

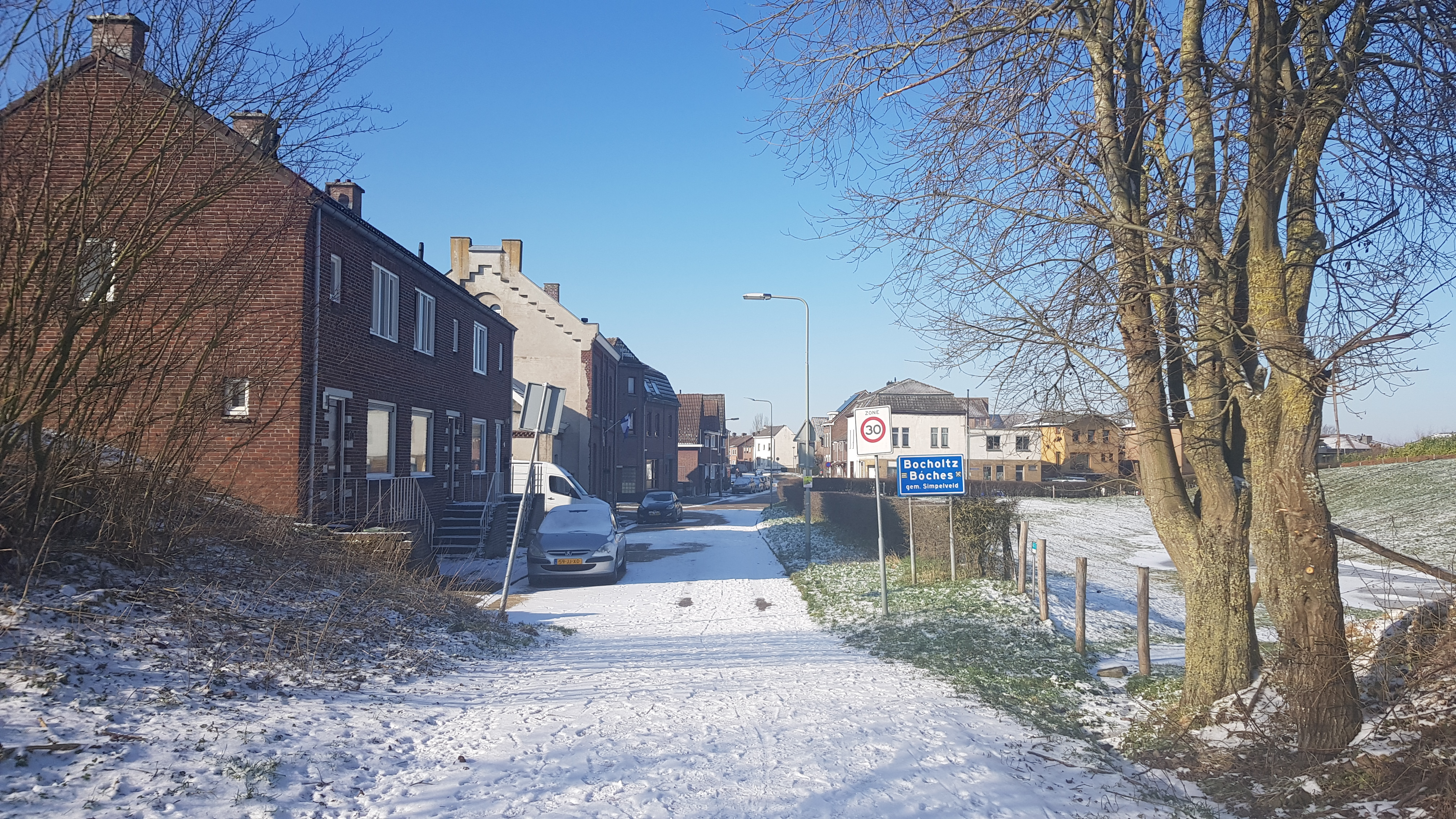
Bocholtz in winter

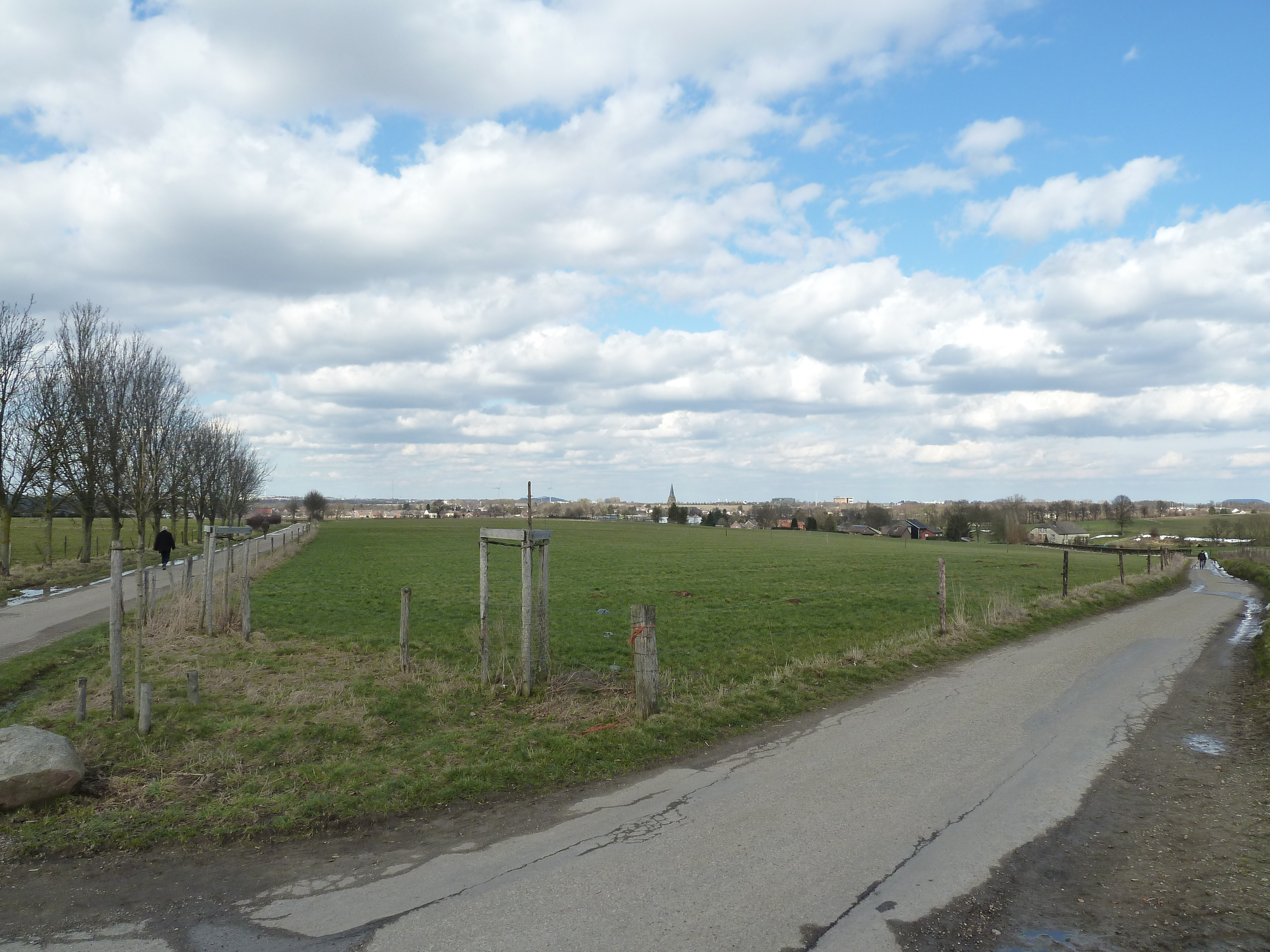
Location of the Roman villa Vlengendaal

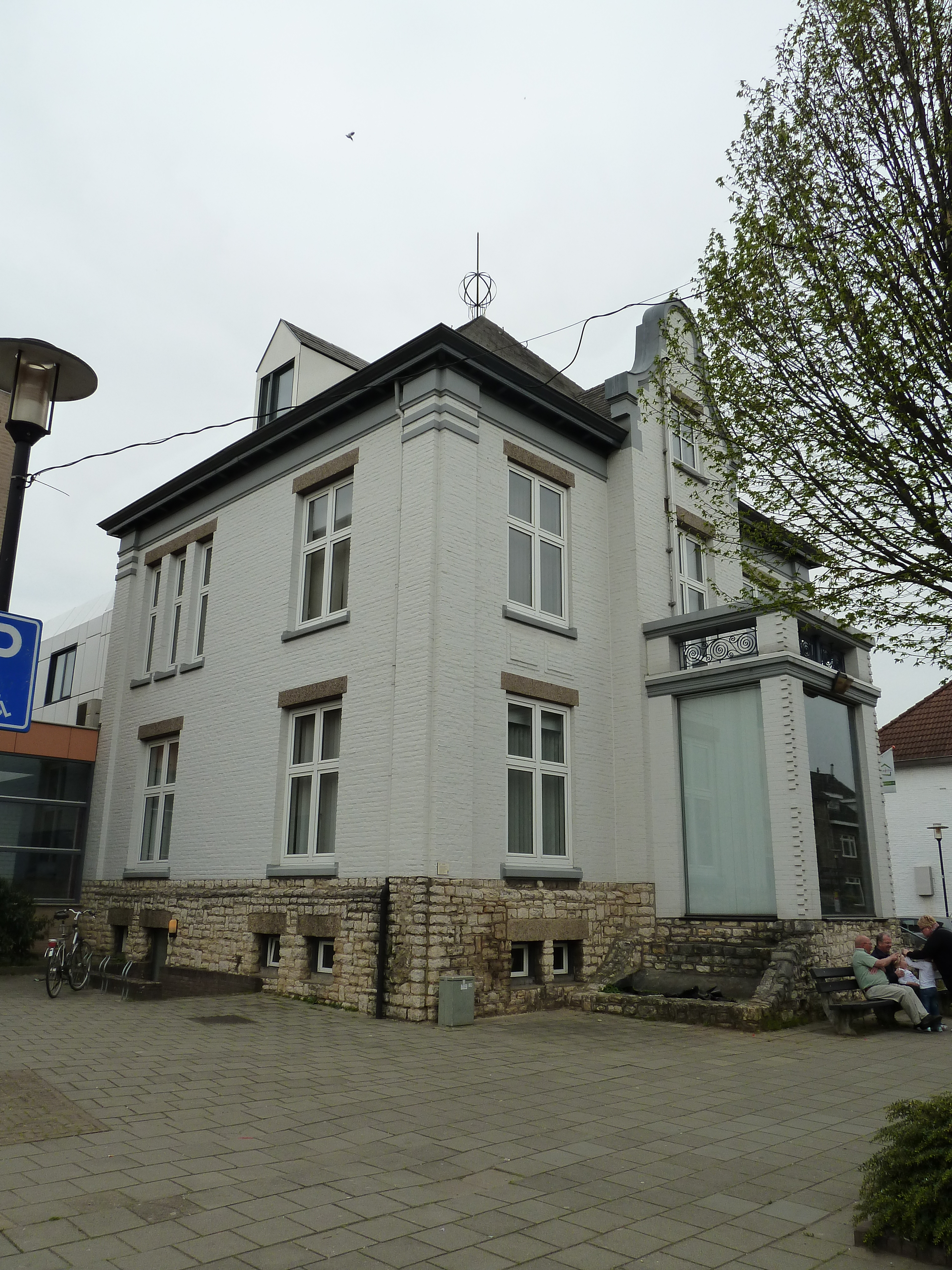
Former town hall
