= Sisters of the Poor Child Jesus =

The Sisters of the Poor Child Jesus is a Roman Catholic religious congregation for women, founded at Aachen, Germany, in 1844 for the support and education of poor, orphan, and destitute children, especially girls. It was approved by Pope Pius IX in 1862 and 1869, and by Pope Leo XIII in 1881 and 1888. They also founded a school in Barnet, London, called St Michael's Catholic Grammar School.

== History ==
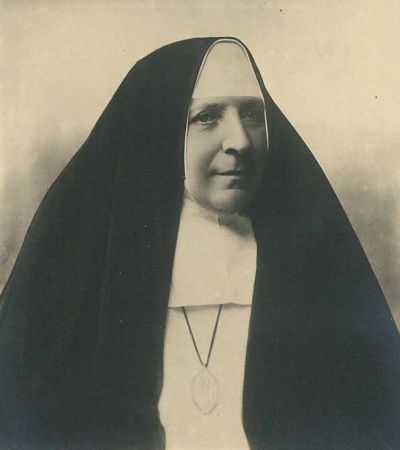
Clare Fey, the first mother superior

Clare Fey, Leocadia Startz, Wilhelmina Istas, and Aloysia Vossen were at school together at Aachen, and became co-foundresses of the congregation. The home of Clare Fey was a rendezvous for priests and laity for the discussion of religious and social questions. In February 1837 Clare and some companions rented a house, gathered together some children, fed, clothed, and taught them. Soon the old Dominican convent was secured and, with other houses, opened as schools. After seven years the four foundresses entered upon community life 2 February 1844, under the rule and direction of Clare Fey (born 11 April 1815; died 8 May 1894). They were the founders of St Michael's Catholic Grammar School.

In 1845 Cardinal Geissel of Cologne approved the rules and obtained recognition from the Holy See, whilst the Prussian Government also authorized the foundation. An old convent in Jakobstrasse became the first motherhouse of the new order. The growth was rapid, and in quick succession houses were opened at Bonn, Derendorf, Düsseldorf, Neuss, Cologne, Coblenz, Landstuhl, Luxembourg, Stolberg, and Vienna.

The need to raise funds for the charitable work of rescue, as well as the entreaties of bishops, led to other activities being undertaken, e.g. high schools for girls, training of domestics, homes for girls in business, modelling of wax figures for statues, and most notably church embroidery. For the latter, designs were furnished by Pugin at the instance of Mrs. Edgar, an English resident of Aachen, and the embroidery of the sisters became famed throughout Germany and the neighbouring countries.

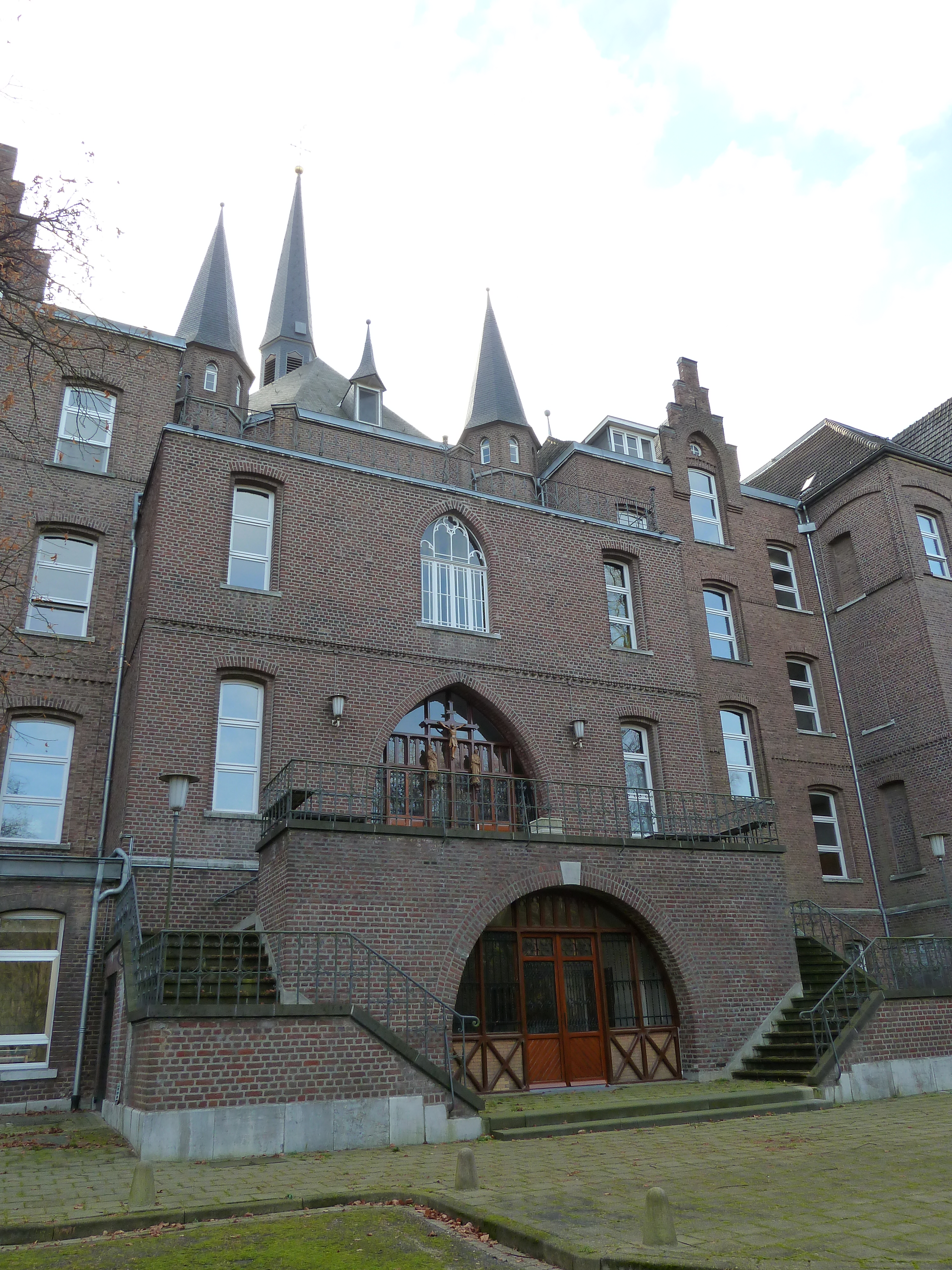
General Motherhouse Loreto in Simpelveld, Netherlands

The house at Burtscheid (Aachen) became the German secretariate of the society of the Holy Childhood. The influence of the empress delayed the expulsion of the congregation during the Kulturkampf until 1875, when steps were taken to close the houses in Prussia; but not until 1878 was the motherhouse at Aachen transferred to Simpelveld, a few miles over the Dutch frontier. Franz Bock supported the Sisters in their new workshop in the Netherlands, allowing it to prosper. There Bishop Jean-Théodore Laurent, who had resigned his see, took up his residence, and remained as counsellor until his death in 1884. The exiles found refuge in the Netherlands, Bavaria, Belgium, Luxemburg, and Austria. In England a house was established in 1876 at Southam, where an orphanage was immediately opened by the ten exiles who arrived there. The relaxation of the Falk Laws enabled the congregation in 1887 to regain many of its convents.

== Sources ==
- The entry cites:
- Pfülf, Mutter Clara Fey Vom Armen Kinde Jesus (Freiburg, 1907);
- Mutter Clara (Simpelveld, 1910);
- Max Heimbucher, Die Orden und Kongregationen (Paderborn, 1897
