= List of watermills =

The List of watermills is a link page for any watermill.

== Historical mills ==
- List of ancient watermills
- List of early medieval watermills
- Barbegal aqueduct and mill
- Hierapolis sawmill

== Africa ==
- Drostdy Museum, Swellendam, South Africa
- Josephine Mill, Cape Town, South Africa
- Genadendal Watermill, Genadendal, South Africa
- Elim Watermill, Caledon, South Africa

== Asia ==
- Panchakki, India
- Pundri mill, India

== Australia ==
=== Australia ===
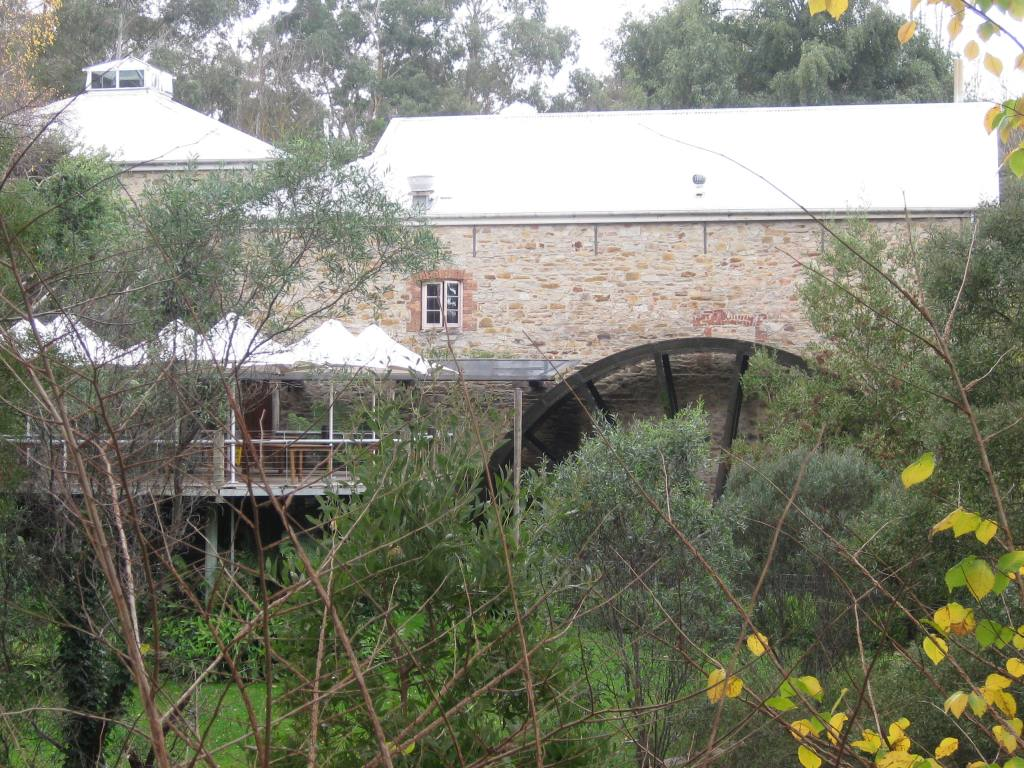
Bridgewater Mill 3

- Anderson's Mill, Smeaton, Victoria
- Barrabool Flour Mill, Buckley's Falls, Highton, Geelong, Victoria
- Ben Eadie Mill, Sunbury, Victoria
- Carome Mill, South Morang, Victoria
- Dight's Ceres Mill, Abbotsford, Victoria
- Dunn's Mill, Bridgewater, South Australia
- Fyansford Paper Mill, Fyansford, Victoria
- Glendining and McKenzie Mill, Riddells Creek, Victoria
- Hepburn's Werona Mill, Kingston, Victoria
- Janefield Mill, Bundoora, Victoria
- Jetty Mills, Warrnambool, Victoria
- Lucas Watermills Archaeological Sites, Sydney, New South Wales
- Polworth Mill, Rosebrook, Victoria
- Thomas Mill, Mernda, Victoria
- Waterwheel Flourmill, Bridgewater on Loddon, Victoria

== Europe ==
=== Austria ===
- Haslachmühle, Gnigl, Salzburg

=== Belgium ===
- Faber Mill, Wallonia
- Moulin Lindekemale, Brussels
- Watermill Sint-Gertrudis-Pede, Flanders

=== France ===
- Ischermühle, Hirschland, Grand Est

=== Ireland ===
- Ballincollig Royal Gunpowder Mills
- Clonmoyle Mill
- Cregg Mill, County Galway
- Milford Mills, County Carlow
- Newmills Corn and Flax Mills

=== Isle of Man ===
- Laxey Wheel
- Little Isabella
- Snaefell Wheel

=== Kosovo ===
- Ali Bel Bicaj Tower House and Mill
- Hajrizi Mill

=== Luxemburg ===
- Lameschmillen

=== Netherlands ===
- Bulkemsmolen
- Gennep Watermill
- Kruitmolen
- Oliemolen, Heerlen
- Opwetten Watermill
- Oude Molen, Simpelveld
- Watermill at Kollen
- Weltermolen, Welten

=== Switzerland ===
- Hofenmühle

=== United Kingdom ===
See List of watermills in the United Kingdom.

== North America ==
=== Canada ===
- Arva Flour Mill, Arva, Ontario
- Balmoral Grist Mill Museum, Nova Scotia
- Caledonia Mill, Caledonia, Ontario
- Kings Landing Historical Settlement, New Brunswick
- Morningstar Mill, St. Catharines, Ontario
- Tyrone Mill, Tyrone, Ontario
- Moulin du Petit-Pré, Château-Richer, Quebec
- Watson's Mill, Manotick, Ontario
- Wile Carding Mill, Bridgewater, Nova Scotia

=== United States ===
See List of watermills in United States

== See also ==
- List of windmills
- Tide mill
- Gristmill
