= Bulkemsbroek =

Coordinates: 50°49′46″N 5°57′54″E

Bulkemsbroek D'r Bulkemsbróch
- Village
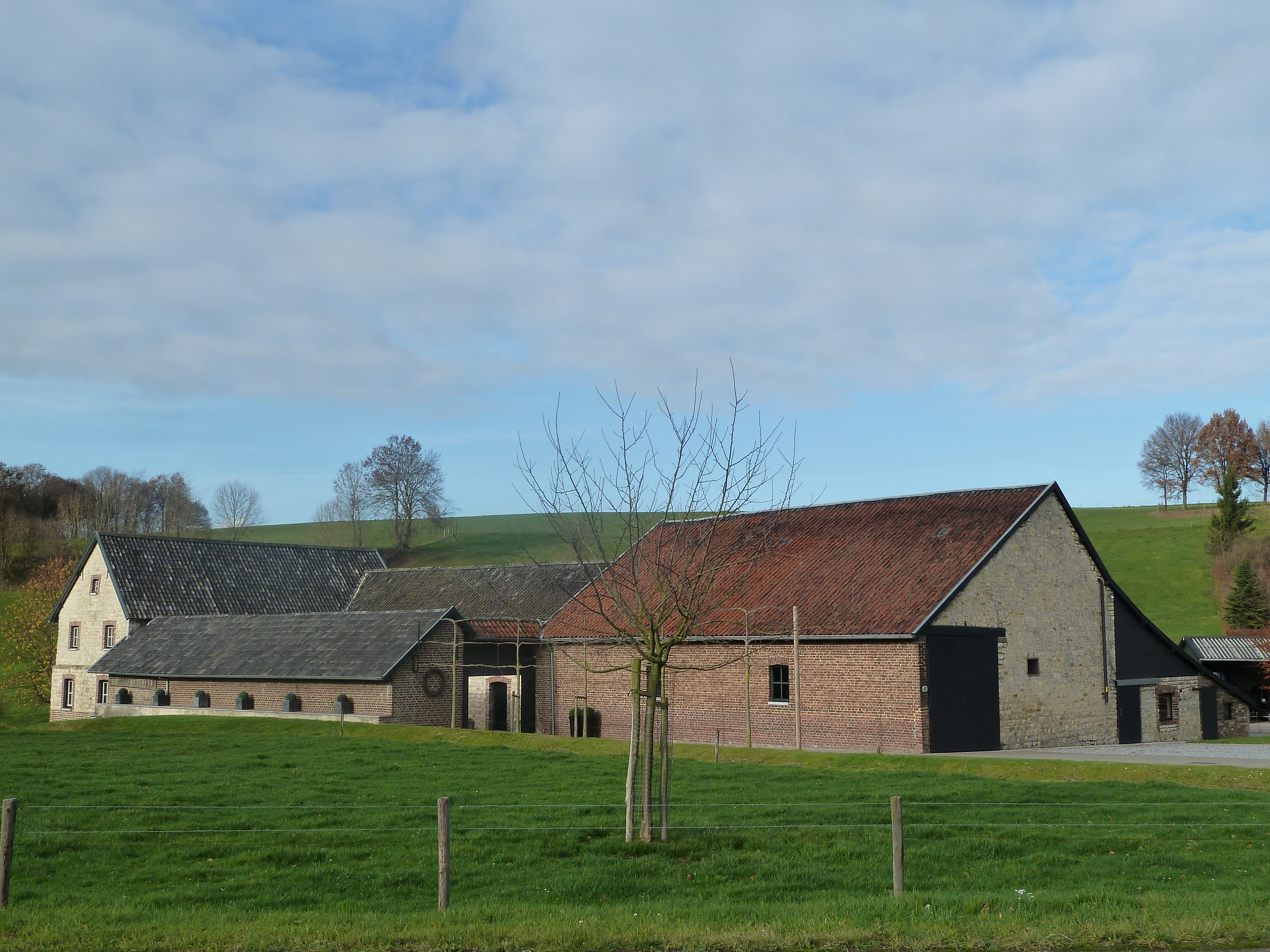
- Bulkemsmolen

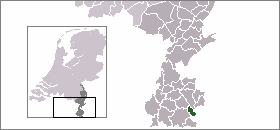
- Country: Netherlands
- Province: Limburg
- Municipality: Simpelveld

Population
  - Total: 30
- Time zone: UTC+1 (CET)
  - Summer (DST): UTC+2 (CEST)

Bulkemsbroek (Dutch pronunciation: [ˈbʏlkəmzbruk]; Limburgish: D'r Bulkemsbróch [dəʀ ˈbʏl(ə)kəmzbʀʊx]) is a hamlet in the southeastern Netherlands. It is located close to the village of Simpelveld in the municipality of Simpelveld, Limburg, about 20 km east of Maastricht. The village has a population of 30 people.

The name Bulkemsbroek refers to swampland (broek) close to the land of the Bullo family (Bulkem).

On the molenbeek, a sidestream of the river Eyserbeek, lies the Bulkemsmolen. This watermill was built in 1753 and has been designated a national monument.
