= List of watermills in the Crown Dependencies =

This is a list of some of the surviving watermills and tide mills in the Crown Dependencies.

== Bailiwick of Guernsey ==
=== Alderney ===
- Alderney Watermill, Alderney

=== Guernsey ===
- Les Niaux Mill, Saint Andrew

== Bailiwick of Jersey ==
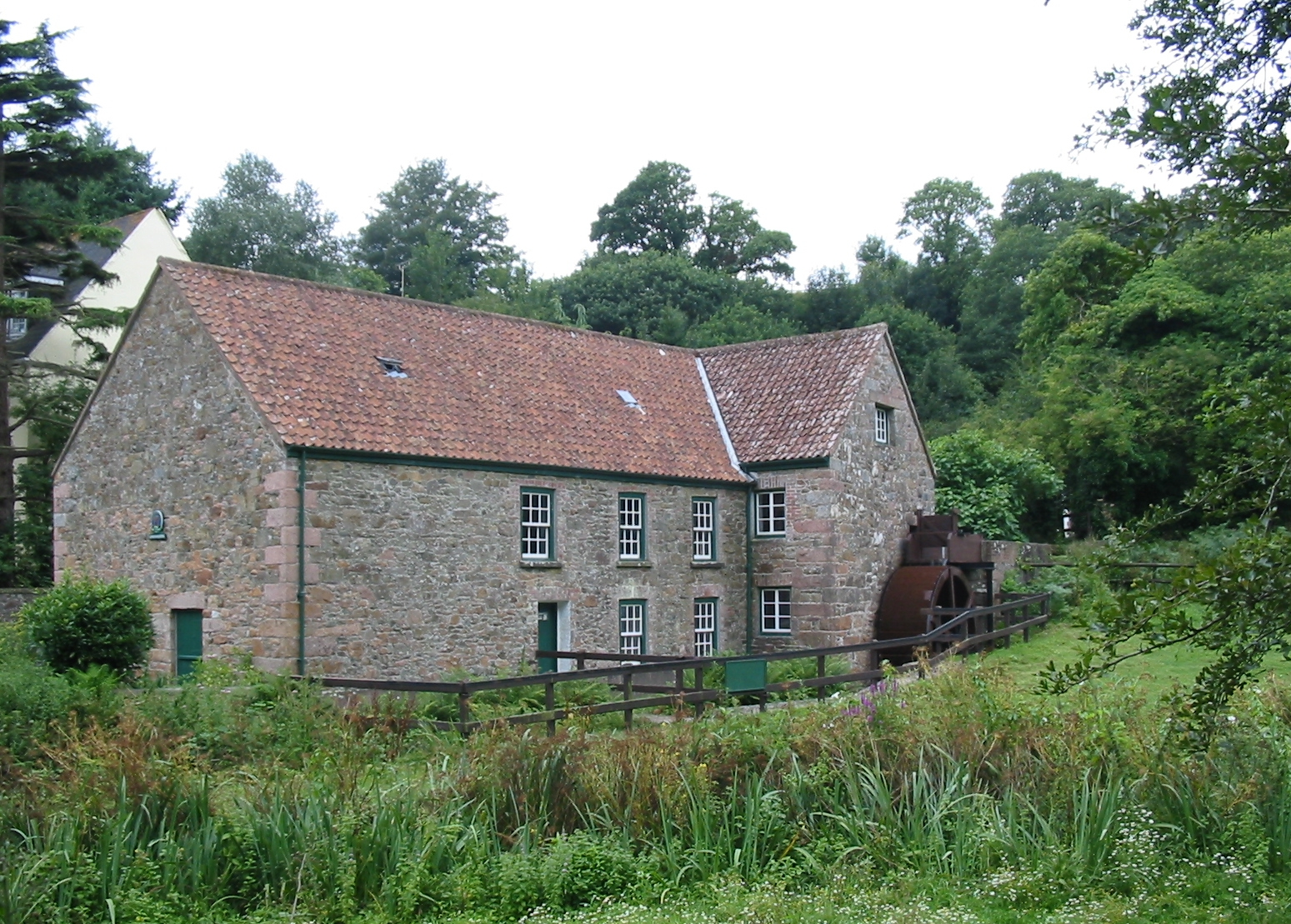
Le Moulin de Quétivel in St Peter: the only functional watermill remaining on Jersey

- Moulin Nicolle, St Helier
- Moulin de Quétivel, St Lawrence
- Gigoulande Mill, St Mary
- Moulin de Lecq, La Greve de Lecq, St Ouen
- Gargate Mill, St Peter
- Moulin de Quétivel, St Peter
- Tesson Mill, St Peter
- Paul Mill, St Saviour
- Moulin de Bas, Trinity

== Isle of Man ==
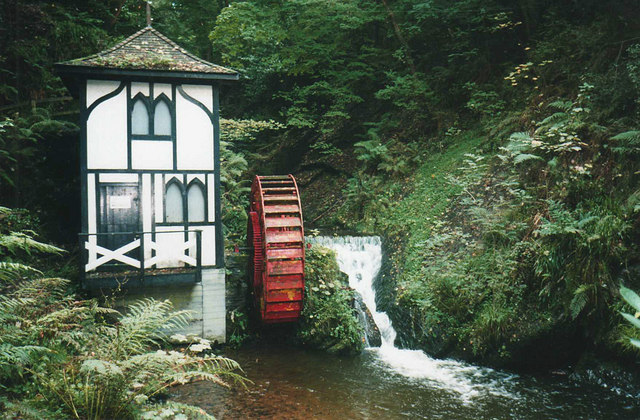
The Groudle Glen Water Wheel, "Little Isabella"

- Cregg Mill, Ballasalla
- Water-Driven Carousel, Ballasalla
- Golden Meadow Mill, Castletown
- Abbeylands Waterwheel, East Baldwin Onchan
- Glen Wylin Mill, Kirk Michael
- Little Isabella, Groudle Glen, Onchan
- Lady Isabella Waterwheel, Laxey
- Snaefell Wheel, Laxey

== See also ==
- List of watermills in the United Kingdom
- List of windmills in Guernsey
- Windmills in Jersey
- Windmills in the Isle of Man
