= John Stuart Hepburn =

Australian settler

Captain John Hepburn
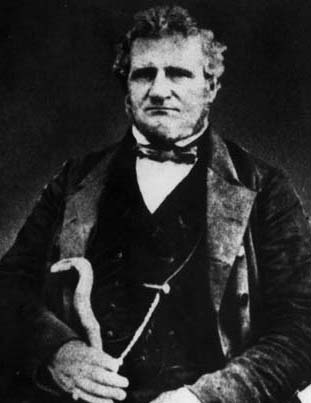
- Born: John Stuart Hepburn; 10 December 1803; Whitekirk, East Lothian, Scotland
- Died: 7 August 1860 (aged 56); Smeaton, Victoria, Australia
- Occupations: Master mariner; Pastoralist; Magistrate
- Notable work: Smeaton; Hepburn Springs
- Spouse: Eliza(beth) Coombes (m. 1830)
- Children: 2

Captain John Stuart Hepburn (1803–1860) was a master mariner, and an early Australian pastoralist, landholder, and magistrate, in rural Colonial Victoria.

== Biography ==
Hepburn was born in Whitekirk, East Lothian, Scotland on 10 December 1803. He initially became a seafaring man and progressed to become master of a 205-tonne-ton (226-short-ton) brig, Alice, and made at least eight voyages between England and Australia.

In 1835, the Alice sailed for Hobart. On board was John Gardiner, a former banker, who talked Hepburn into joining him in a pastoral run. Hepburn joined Gardiner and Joseph Hawdon in a venture to overland cattle to Port Phillip. The overlanding trip was successful. Hepburn met up with Captain John Coghill and his brother William. The brothers were settled at Kirkham and Stathellen near Braidwood, in the Colony of New South Wales.

In 1837, Hepburn and William Coghill became partners in a plan to overland 1400 ewes, 50 rams and 200 wethers to central Victoria. On 15 January 1838, the party left Strathallen for Victoria. Shortly after leaving Gundagai, they met William Bowman and the three parties travelled southward, crossing the Murray River near Albury. The Major's (Major Mitchell) tracks were picked up near Wangaratta and followed to Mount Alexander, where they set up a lambing camp in April. Bowman stayed, establishing the Sutton Grange run, but leaving it for Jas Orr when he moved on to Stratford near Heathcote.

== Smeaton Hill Run ==
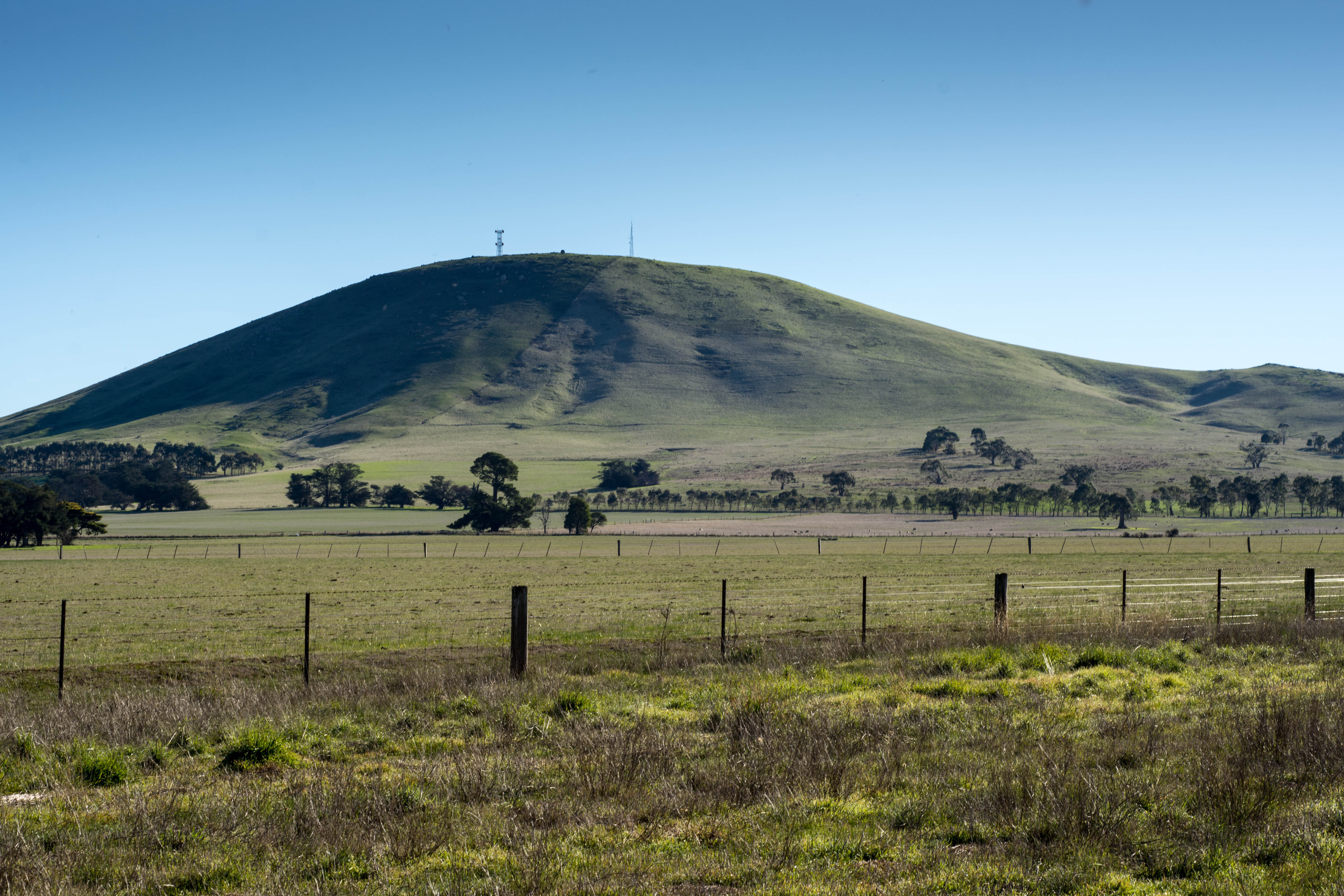
Mount Kooroocheang, an extinct volcano in Victoria, Australia.

Hepburn had hoped to settle on the country he had passed through in 1836 but found it was all taken.

From Mount Alexander, Hepburn sited Mount Kooroocheang, and the Major's Mammaloid Hills. The party moved on to establish the Smeaton Hill Run on 15 April 1838. William Coghill travelled further west, crossing Bullarook Creek and establishing Glendaruel and then Glendonald. Captain Hepburn named Smeaton Hill station after a small hamlet which lay near his birthplace. The homestead which he named Smeaton House, was constructed in 1849-50 and is occupied today. Hepburn founded the rural town of Smeaton and the town of Hepburn Springs is named after him.

Hepburn died on 7 August 1860, aged 56 years, due to complications associated with kidney disease. He was survived by his wife, Eliza (1805–1869) and their two children. Hepburn was buried with other members of his family in a small cemetery on the property. Smeaton House was purchased by the Righetti family and is sometimes open to the public.
