= Hepburn Lagoon =

Artificial lake in Victoria, Australia

Hepburn's Lagoon
- Location in Victoria
- Location: Smeaton, Victoria
- Coordinates: 37.366218°S 144.0130994°E
- Type: Artificial
- Primary inflows: Langdon's Creek
- Primary outflows: Birch Creek outlet; evaporation
- Basin countries: Australia
- Max. length: 1.3 km (0.81 mi)
- Max. width: 1 km (0.62 mi)
- Water volume: 3,000 ML (660,000,000 imp gal; 790,000,000 US gal)
- Settlements: Smeaton

Hepburn Lagoon is a large artificial lake located between Kingston and Blampied, in Victoria, Australia.

The Lagoon is in a basalt plain and originally was a swamp in a natural depression formed volcanic activity. Also known as Anderson's Lagoon, the lake is fed by Langdon's Creek, and its water supplies Birch Creek and the water race for Anderson's Mill, Smeaton. It is a popular fishing location. This lagoon contains trout, redfin and tench.

== History ==
The first dam was built sometime before 1864 when a new dam was constructed to supply water to the nearby flour mill. This was breached in the superfloods of 1870, causing considerable damage and instigating a lawsuit by affected landowners. A new dam was constructed in 1871–2 to improve the Clunes water supply. This was further enlarged in 1960 to its current capacity of 3,000 ML. It is used for irrigation and domestic and stock supplies through regulation of Langdon's Creek.

- Historic image
