= William Coghill =

William Coghill (c. 1784-1860) was a pioneer pastoralist and squatter in the Port Phillip District of New South Wales (later Victoria).

Coghill was born in Scotland, probably in 1783 or 1784. (Note: William Coghill's date of birth is uncertain. It has been given as early as 1774, but his stated age at death of 76 would make his year of birth as 1783 or 1784.) At his wedding in Wick, Scotland in 1812, his occupation was listed as shoemaker. He continued in that trade until his departure for New South Wales. Coghill arrived in New South Wales on board the Mangles in 1824, captained by his brother John.

In January 1838, William Coghill and two of his sons travelled from the Monaro Plains, New South Wales, to the Port Phillip District, with John Stuart Hepburn and 2000 sheep. By April 1838, the Coghills had established a run at Glendaruel, near present-day Clunes. By mid 1840, William was back on his property in New South Wales, leaving his sons in charge on the Glendaruel pastoral lease, which was split into two. The second was Glendonald station on Coghills Creek. William later moved to the Moonee Moonee Ponds Creek near Tullamarine.

In 1846, Coghill formed the Immigration Society with others, including A.M. Campbell and G.C. Curlewis, to encourage labourers to the area. Coghill, his wife and younger children lived on the Cumberland Estate on the south of Gellibrand Hill from about 1845 and became prominent in local affairs, including the establishment of the first Scottish Presbyterian church in the district. William's Sons David and George established their own pastoral properties nearby.

Coghill died on 19 July 1860 (aged 76).
