= Eys =

Village in the Netherlands

Eys Ees (Limburgish)
- Village
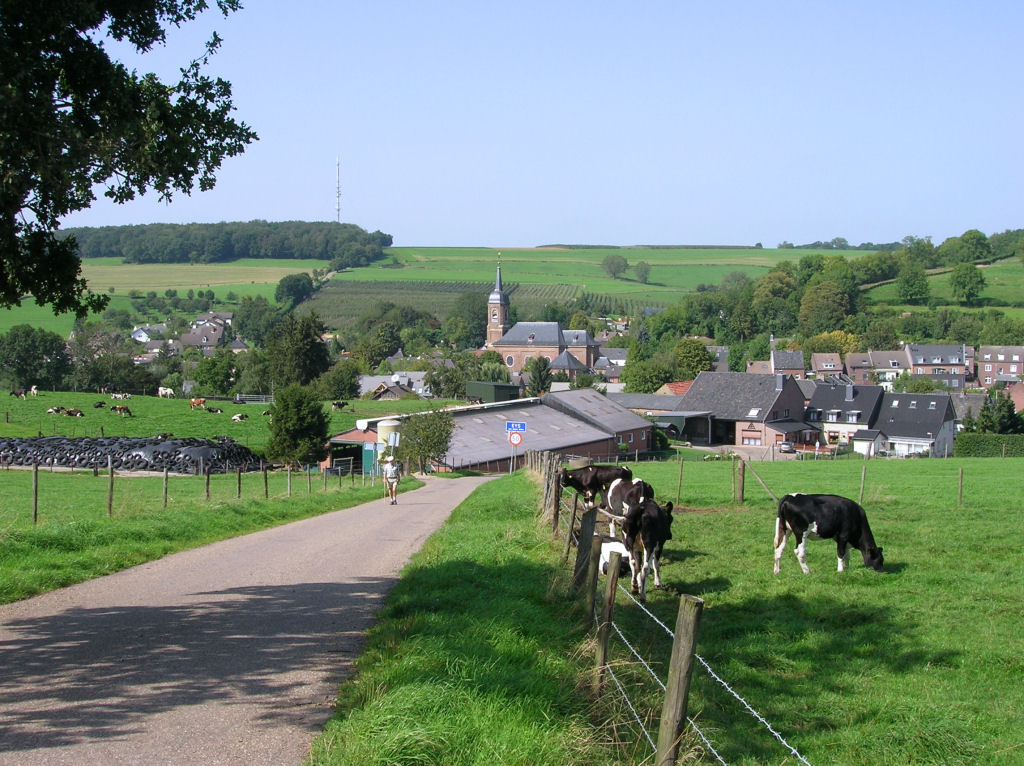
- View of Eys

- Location in the Netherlands Location in the province of Limburg in the Netherlands
- Coordinates: 50°50′N 5°56′E
- Country: Netherlands
- Province: Limburg
- Municipality: Gulpen-Wittem

Area
  - Total: 1.26 km^{2} (0.49 sq mi)
- Elevation: 110 m (360 ft)

Population (2021)
  - Total: 1,435
  - Density: 1,140/km^{2} (2,950/sq mi)
- Time zone: UTC+1 (CET)
  - Summer (DST): UTC+2 (CEST)
- Postal code: 6287
- Dialing code: 043

Eys (Dutch: [ɛis]; Limburgish: Ees [ˈeːs]) is a village in the municipality of Gulpen-Wittem, Limburg, the Netherlands. The town is located 3 km (1.9 mi) from Gulpen and 17 km (11 mi) from provincial capital Maastricht. Furthermore, it is characterised by its location in the hilly landscape of South Limburg. The village was first mentioned in 1193 in a document of the Sint-Pauluskapittel of Liège, Belgium, and was named after the river Eyserbeek.

The Eyserbosweg (the road, weg in Dutch, that leads from the village to the forest, bos) is one of the hills to be climbed in the yearly professional cycle race Amstel Gold Race, first held in 1966. The organiser is not sure when the Eyserbosweg was first involved in the race.

It was also the hill that featured in the Open Dutch Championship Bag Carrying (zakkendragen), a race against the clock in which people had to carry a bag with sand up the 1 kilometre (1,100 yd) long hill. The weight of the bag was 25 kg (55 lb) (women), 50 kg (110 lb), 75 kg (165 lb) or 100 kg (220 lb) (men). That championship had its roots in a bet made by a farmer who claimed in 1956 that his farm help would be able to carry a 100 kg bag to the top.

== Gallery ==
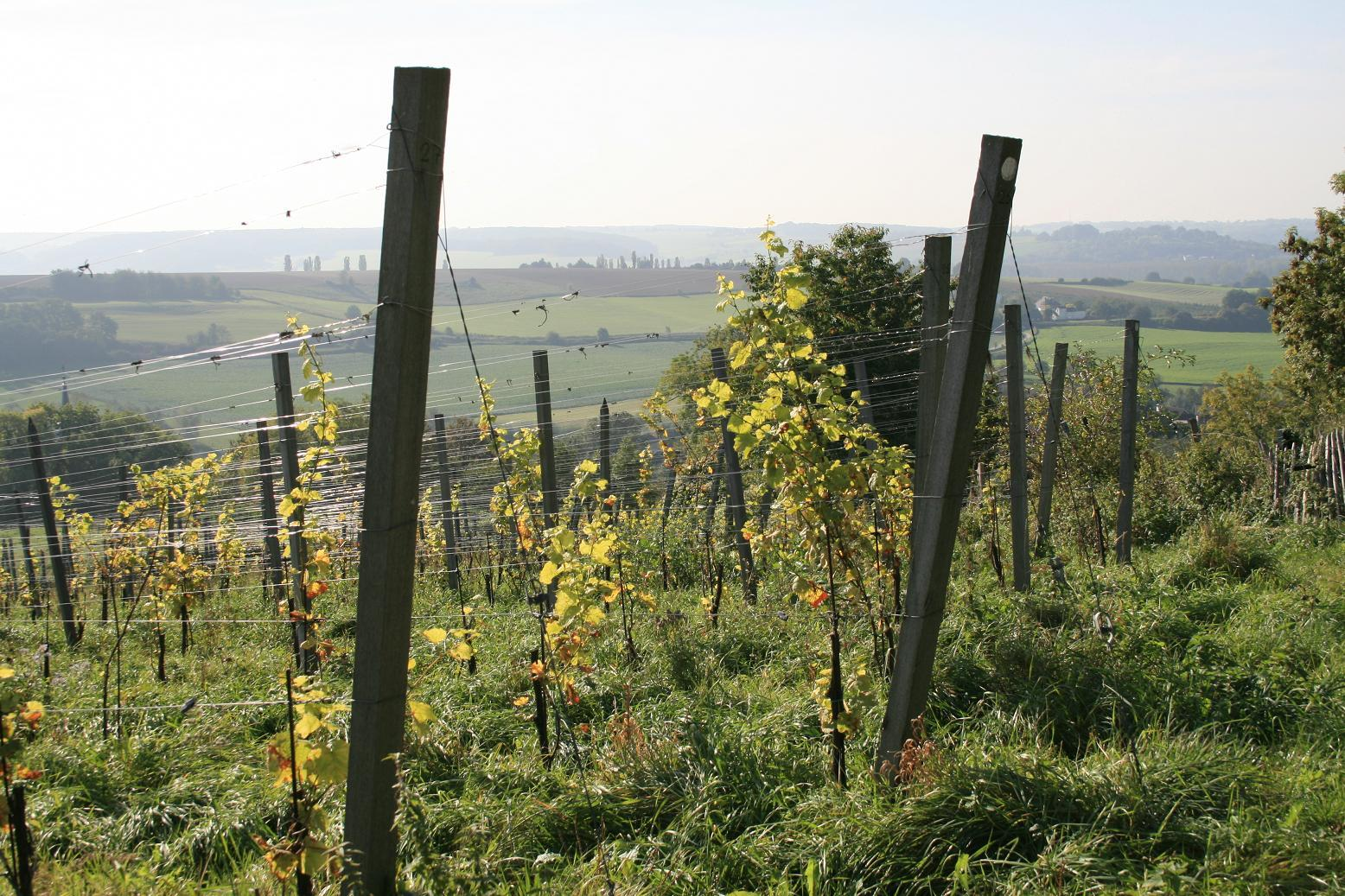
A vineyard near Eys

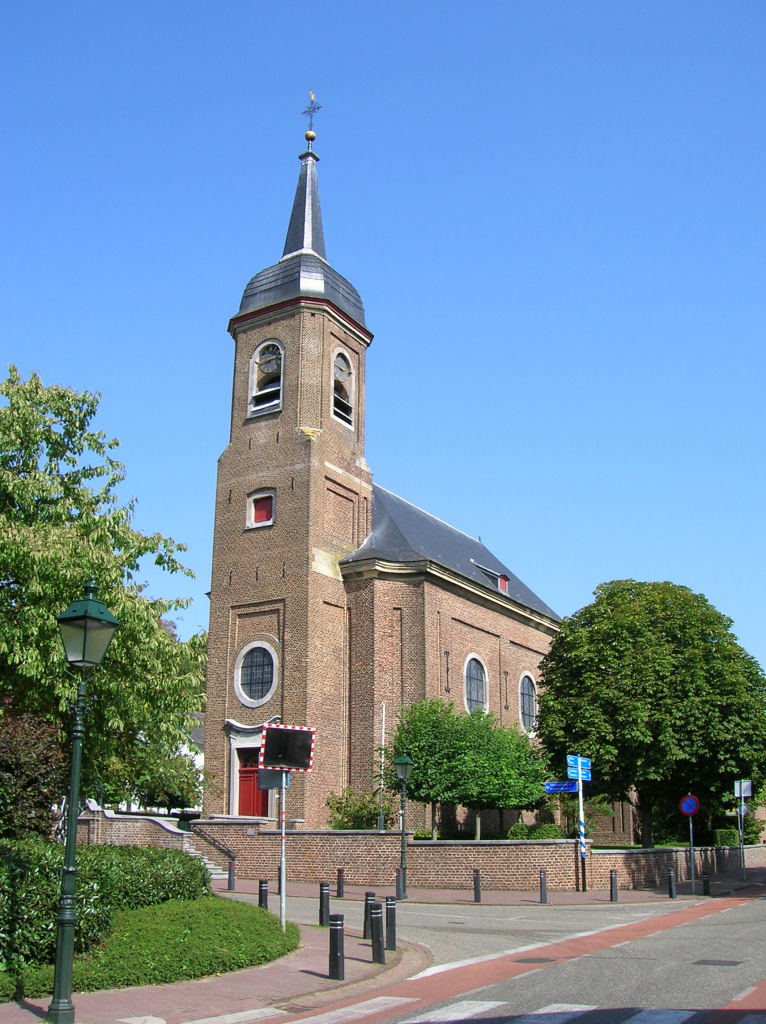
The Saint Agatha Church (Sint-Agathakerk)
