= Moulin du Petit-Pré =

Water-powered flour mill in Château-Richer, Quebec, Canada

Coordinates: 46.9346°N 71.0626°W

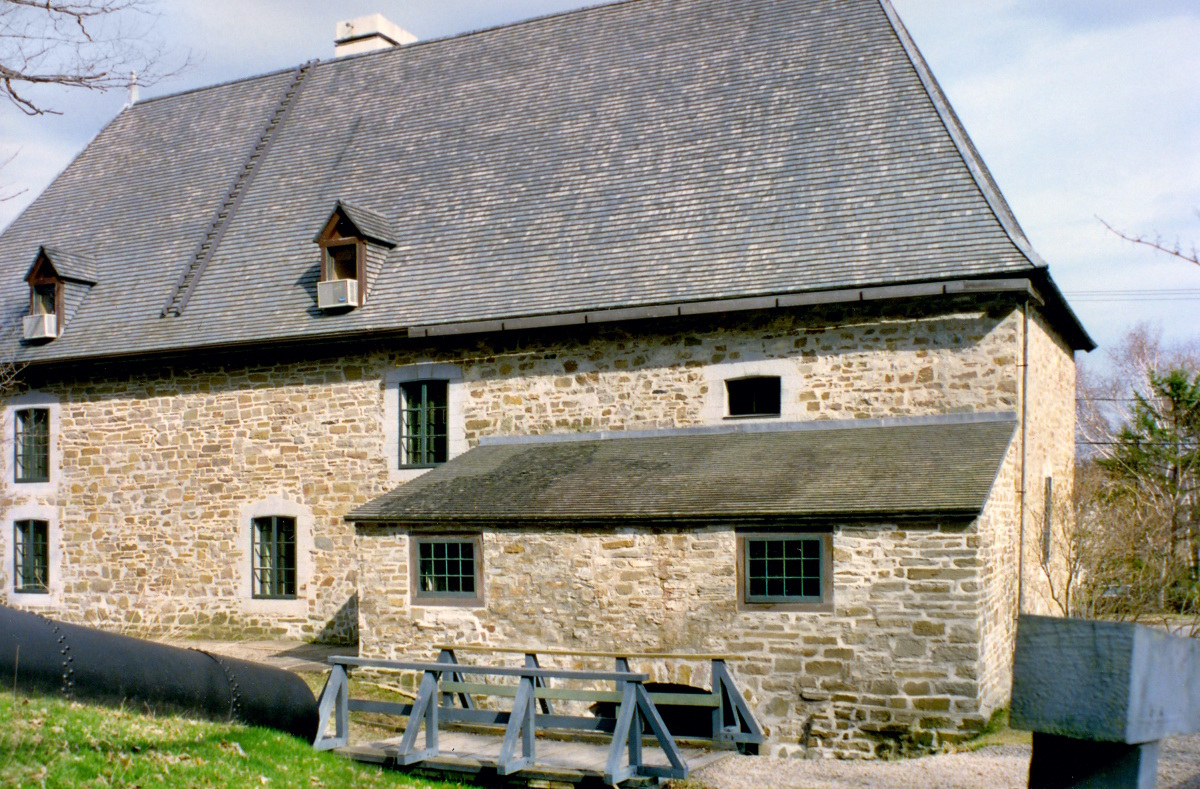
Moulin du Petit-Pré, Château-Richer, Quebec, 1996

Moulin du Petit-Pré, also known as Moulin de Monseigneur-de-Laval, is a water-powered flour mill in Château-Richer, Quebec, Canada on the north shore of the St. Lawrence River about 20 kilometres northeast of the City of Québec. It is the oldest commercial flour mill in North America. The mill was built for the Seminary of Quebec under the auspices of Bishop François de Laval. Construction began in 1691 and was completed by 1695.

At various times in its 325-year history, the mill has been used to grind wheat, mill lumber, and cord wool. It was damaged or destroyed by fire three times. The mill currently serves as a cultural and historical landmark in Quebec.

== History ==
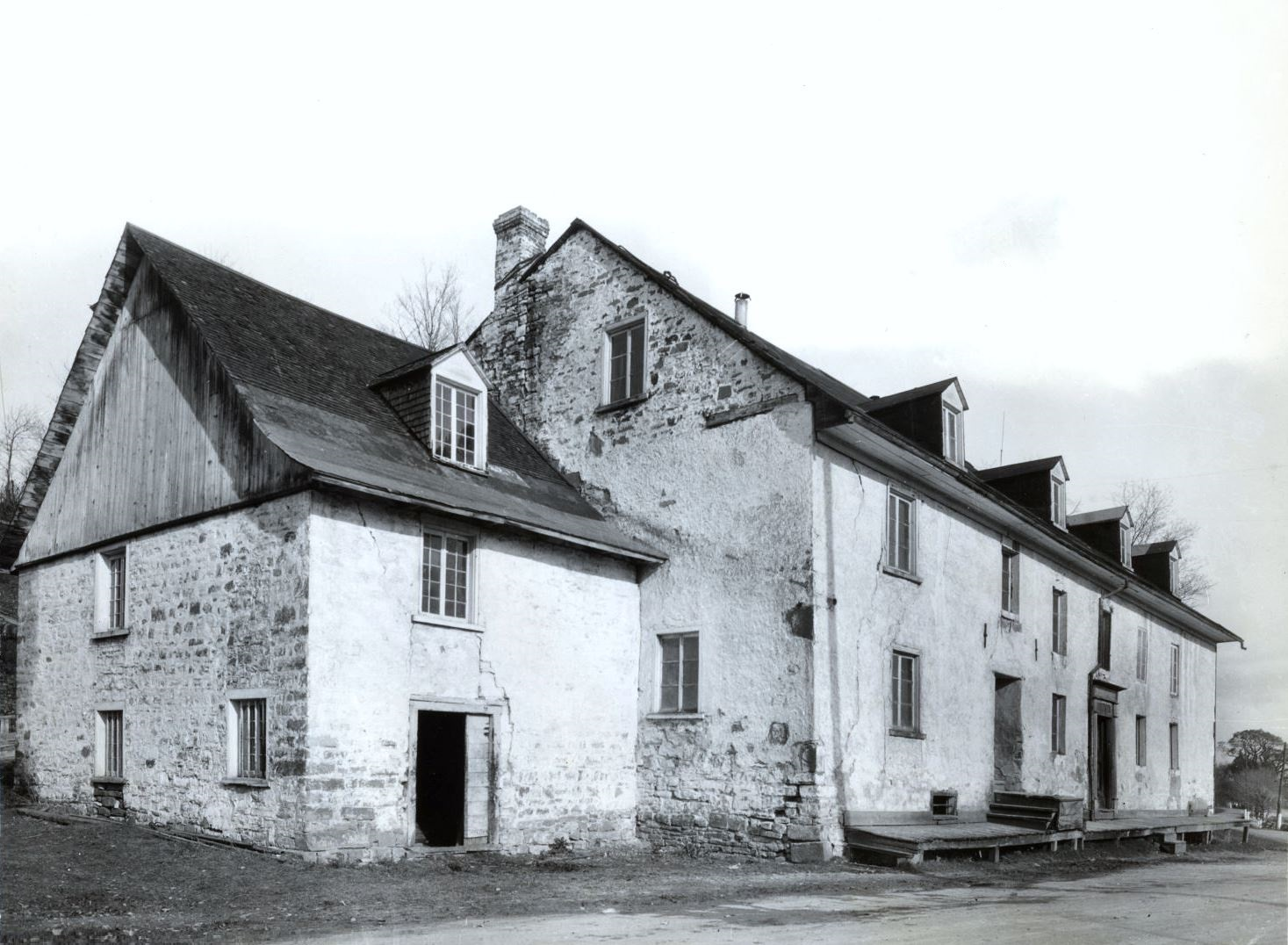
Moulin du Petit-Pré, 1927 by Edgar Gariépy

The mill was constructed between 1691 and 1695 by Charles Pouliot, and was used to grind wheat into flour for local merchants, deriving its power from the Petit-Pré river near where it joins the Saint Lawrence River. Jean Richard was its first miller. A fire in 1702 damaged the building, which was repaired four years later, restoring the original milling capacity. Several repairs and improvements were made to the mill between 1732 and 1744, including the expansion of the building in 1742 to accommodate a third feed mill.

In 1759, the mill and other structures along the Côte de Beaupré were burned by British General James Wolfe during his siege. Jesuits rebuilt the mill over the next five years, including installing two new feed mills. Much of the repair cost was paid for by Antoine Nadeau, who had leased the mill since 1757.

In 1778 a third feed mill was installed by the seminary. In 1810, Charles Bélanger obtained permission from the seminary to add a sawmill to the structure. Construction of the sawmill was completed in 1819. After Quebec abandoned the seigneurial system, the mill was adapted for the additional function of carding wool by Joseph Joseph Coté.

In 1871, the seminary sold the combined sawmill, flour mill and carding mill to George Benson Hall, Jr. Six years later, fire again destroyed the mill, which again was immediately rebuilt—this time with an updated turbine to replace the antiquated water wheel. In 1877 the mill was sold to Richard Temblay, who in 1889 gave it to his son, Richard. In 1897, the mill was sold to Zoé Richard (née Turgeon). Her daughter in turn inherited the mill in January 1925.

=== Modern history ===
In 1944, Château-Richer Cooperative assumed ownership of the mill until it was purchased by Pierre Jobidon in 1965. A year later, the Ministry of Cultural Affairs purchased the mill. In the 1970s, archaeological excavation aided in the partial restoration of the mill to its appearance around the time of its original construction. Ultimately, the mill was restored to its appearance in 1763.

In 1982, the mill housed a few municipal government offices as well as a Ministry of Cultural Affairs cultural centre. Ownership transferred in 1995 to Gestion Promiel Inc. In 2002, the Corporation pour la mise en valeur du Moulin du Petit Pré was formed to undertake additional restoration work, completed in 2003.

== Current use ==
Since 2003, the mill has served as a small cultural history museum. Open to visitors, the centre has a bistro, reception hall and hosts various community cultural events. It won the 2003 Tourism Novelty Award of Bienvenue Québec.

== See also ==
- List of watermills
- List of windmills in Quebec
