= Mount Kooroocheang =

Mountain in Victoria, Australia

Coordinates: 37°17′49″S 143°59′04″E

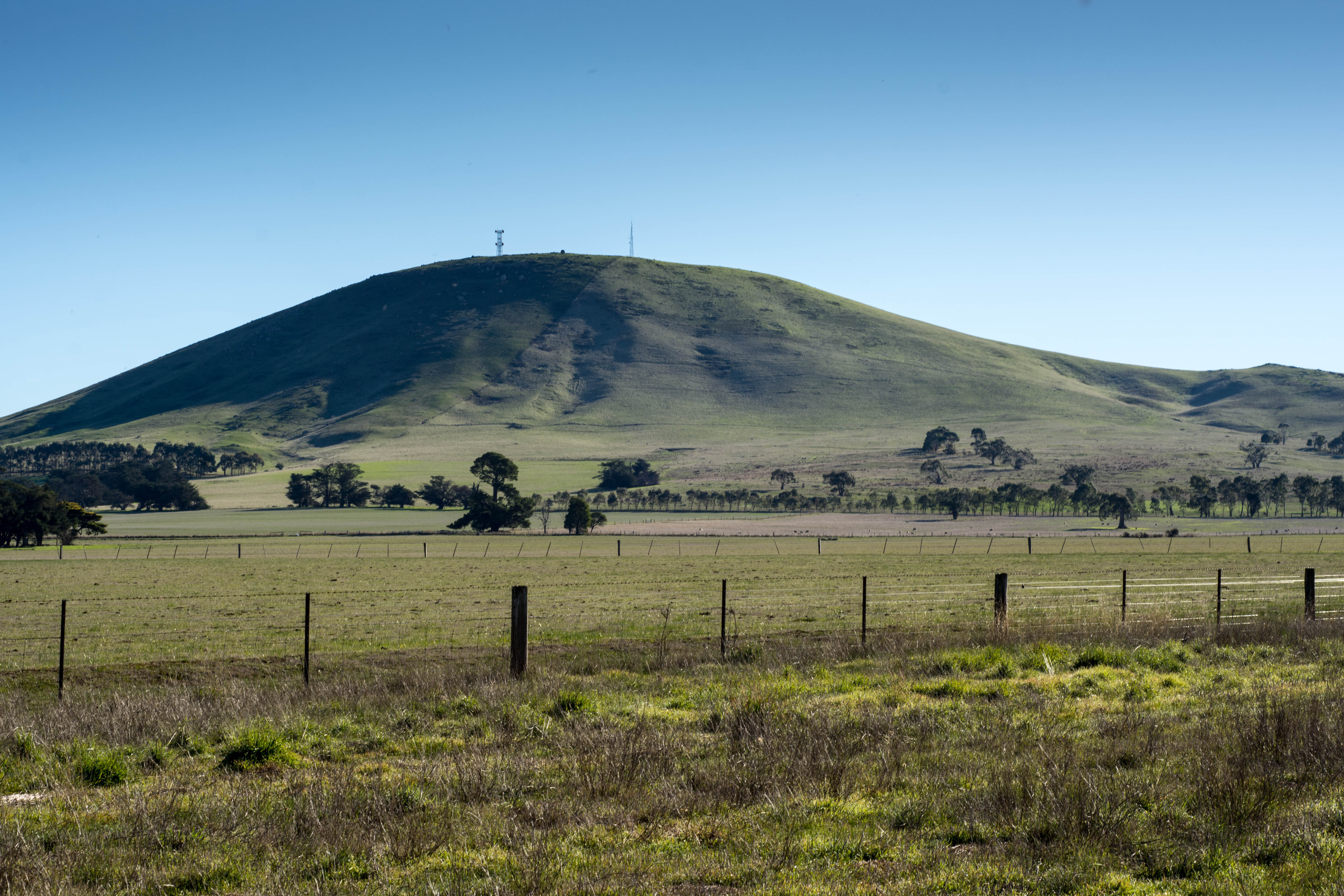
Mount Kooroocheang

Mount Kooroocheang, also known as Smeaton Hill, is a dormant volcano, situated near the town of Smeaton, Victoria, Australia. It is about 140 km northwest of Melbourne. It is a large composite scoria cone. Mount Kooroocheang is one of the largest eruption points on the Victorian Central Plateau, and is about 230 metres in height above the surrounding plains and 676 metres above sea level. There is a communications tower on the summit.

Mount Kooroocheang was featured in a painting by Eugene von Guerard in 1864, "A view from Mount Franklin towards Mount Kooroocheang and the Pyrenees", which is in the Queensland Art Gallery.
