= Hirschland =

Hirschland Hírschlànd
- Commune
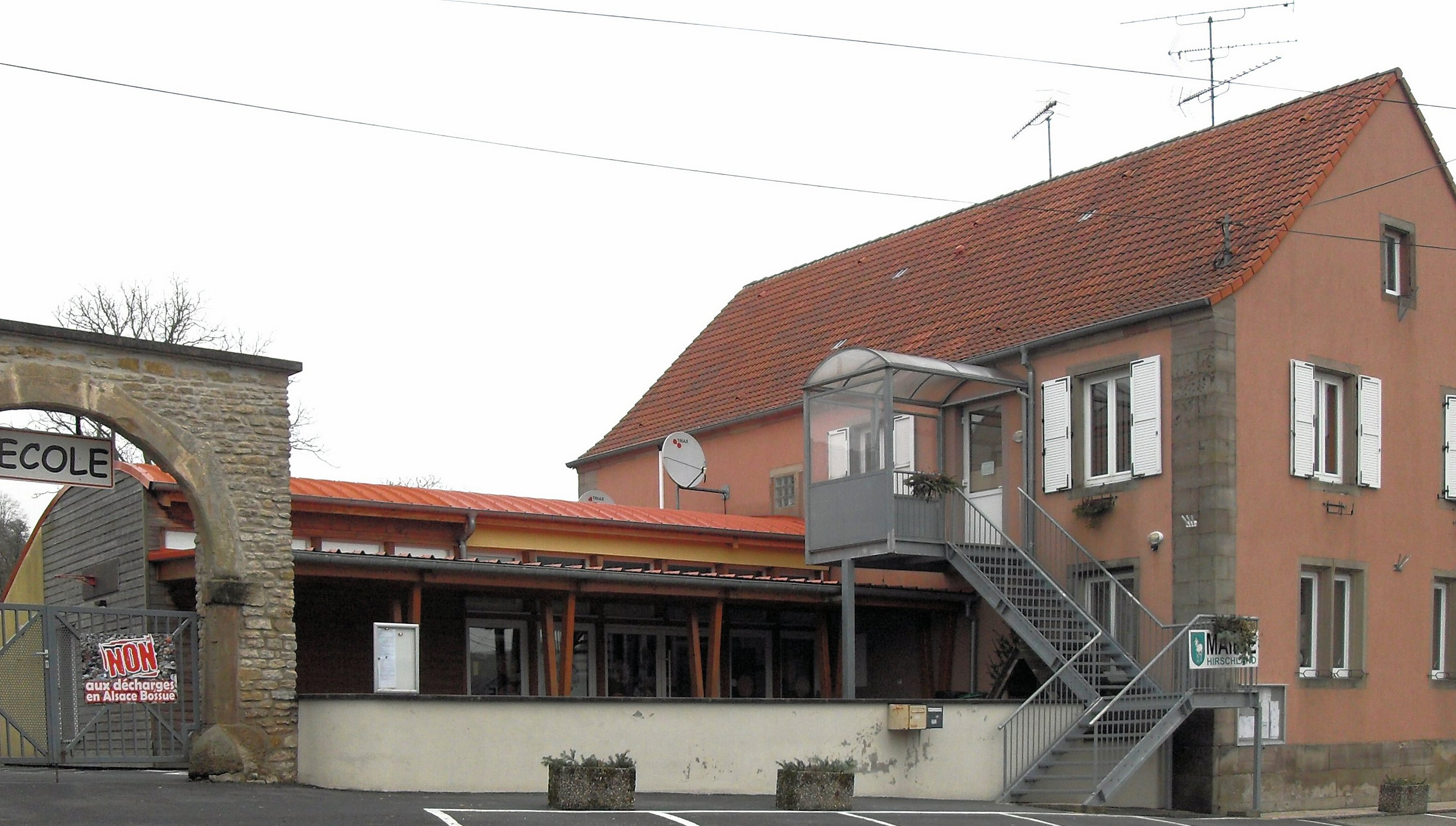
- The town hall in Hirschland

- Coat of arms
- Location of Hirschland
- Location within France Location within Grand Est
- Coordinates: 48°50′16″N 7°06′45″E
- Country: France
- Region: Grand Est
- Department: Bas-Rhin
- Arrondissement: Saverne
- Canton: Ingwiller

Government
  - Mayor (2020–2026): Guy Dierbach
- Area^{1}: 10.73 km^{2} (4.14 sq mi)
- Highest elevation: 332 m (1,089 ft)
- Lowest elevation: 244 m (801 ft)
- Population (2023): 303
  - Density: 28.2/km^{2} (73.1/sq mi)
- Time zone: UTC+01:00 (CET)
  - Summer (DST): UTC+02:00 (CEST)
- INSEE/Postal code: 67201 /67320
- ^{1} French Land Register data, which excludes lakes, ponds, glaciers > 1 km^{2} (0.386 sq mi or 247 acres) and river estuaries.

Hirschland is a commune in the Bas-Rhin department in Grand Est in north-eastern France.

Hirschland is some twelve kilometres (seven miles) to the northwest of Phalsbourg, beside the autoroute towards Sarre-Union and, further to the west, Metz.

== Points of interest ==
- Ischermühle

== See also ==
- Communes of the Bas-Rhin department
