= Ischermühle =

Water mill in France

Coordinates: 48.8468°N 7.1428°E

Ischermühle (English: Isch Mill, French: Moulin de l'Isch) is a 16th-century water mill near Hirschland, France. It is situated on the river Isch, a tributary stream of the Saar.

The first mill on the site was built in 1587 by Schneider Adam Weyer, and a stone inside mill bears the date 1612. It was damaged during the Thirty Years War which ended in 1648. The Ischermühle was bought in 1683 by Johann Brua for 100 gulden and subsequently reconstructed. His son enlarged the mill and left this inscription over the doorway (translated): With trust in God, Hans Adam Brua and his wife Anna Catherina Stroh have built this place - 1707.

The Ischermühle remained in the Brua family until 1878, and continued to mill grain until 1923. For many years it was occupied by an elderly man Albert Wolff, whose father had bought the place in 1901. The mill was damaged by American tanks and artillery from 25 to 26 November 1944 as part of the Lorraine Campaign.

== Bibliography ==
- Brua, L. A. (1996: 2nd ed.) The Brua Family And Bruaw, Bruah, Brewer. Kingston upon Thames, Surrey, England: L.A. Brua.
