= Bulkemsmolen =

Watermill in Simpelveld, Netherlands

- Bulkem's mill
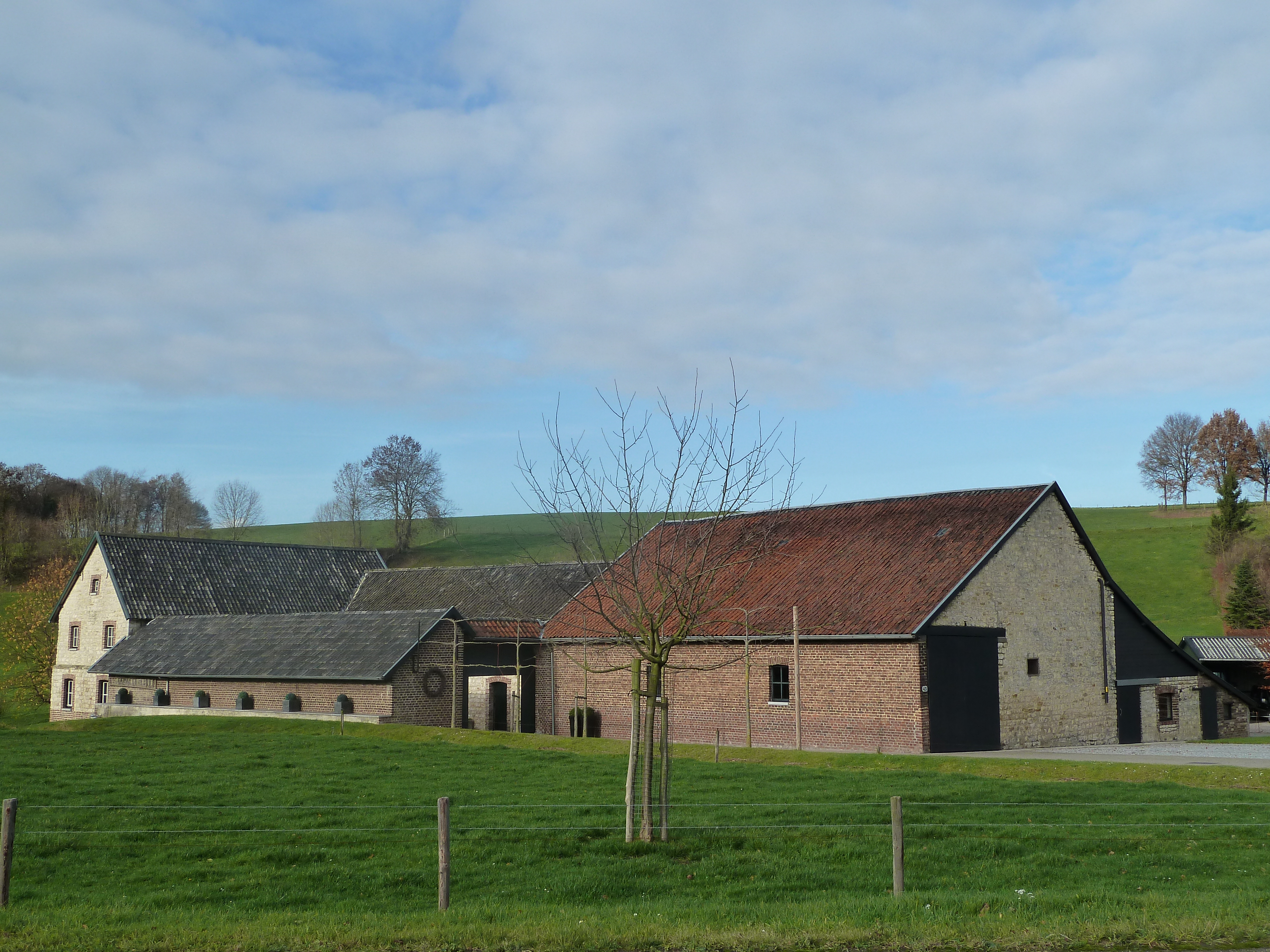
- Bulkemsmolen in 2010
- Interactive map of the Bulkemsmolen area

General information
- Status: Rijksmonument (33588)
- Type: Watermill
- Location: Bulkemstraat 43, Simpelveld, Netherlands
- Coordinates: 50.8287°N 5.9626°E
- Completed: 1774

Design and construction
- Designations: Farmhouse (1978-present); Gristmill (1753-1978)

References
- Database of Former Mills

The Bulkemsmolen (English: Bulkem's Mill) is a former watermill located on the Bulkemstraat 43 in Bulkemsbroek, Simpelveld, Netherlands. Built in 1753 along the Eyserbeek river, the watermill functioned as gristmill until 1978. Currently it functions as housing for a local farm.

The mill is a national monument (nr 33588) since 1967. Of the original mill only the millhouse, a wooden overshot water wheel, of 3.9m diameter and 1.2m width, and the mill race remain.

== Gallery of images ==
Bulkemsmolen

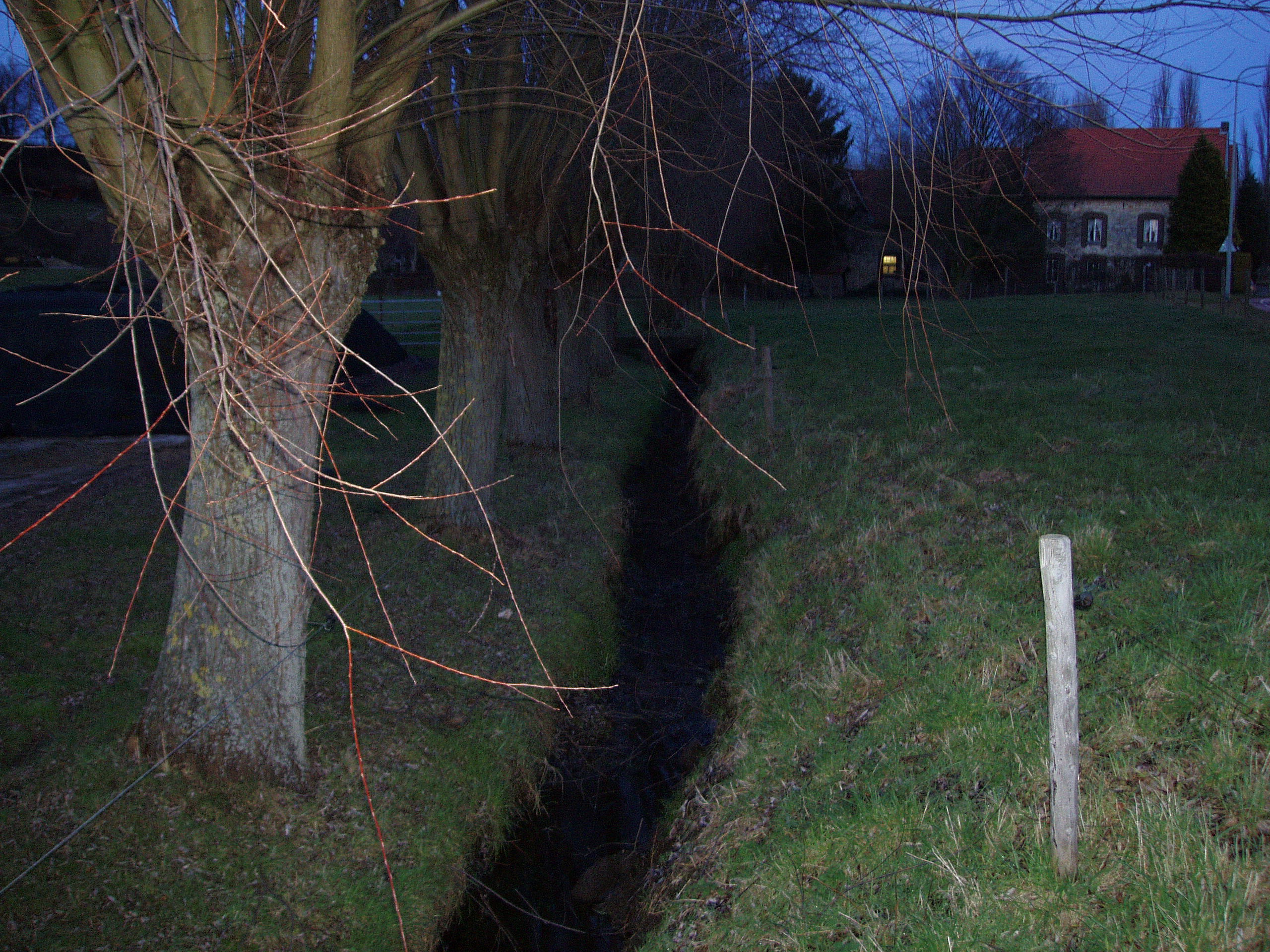
Upstream view

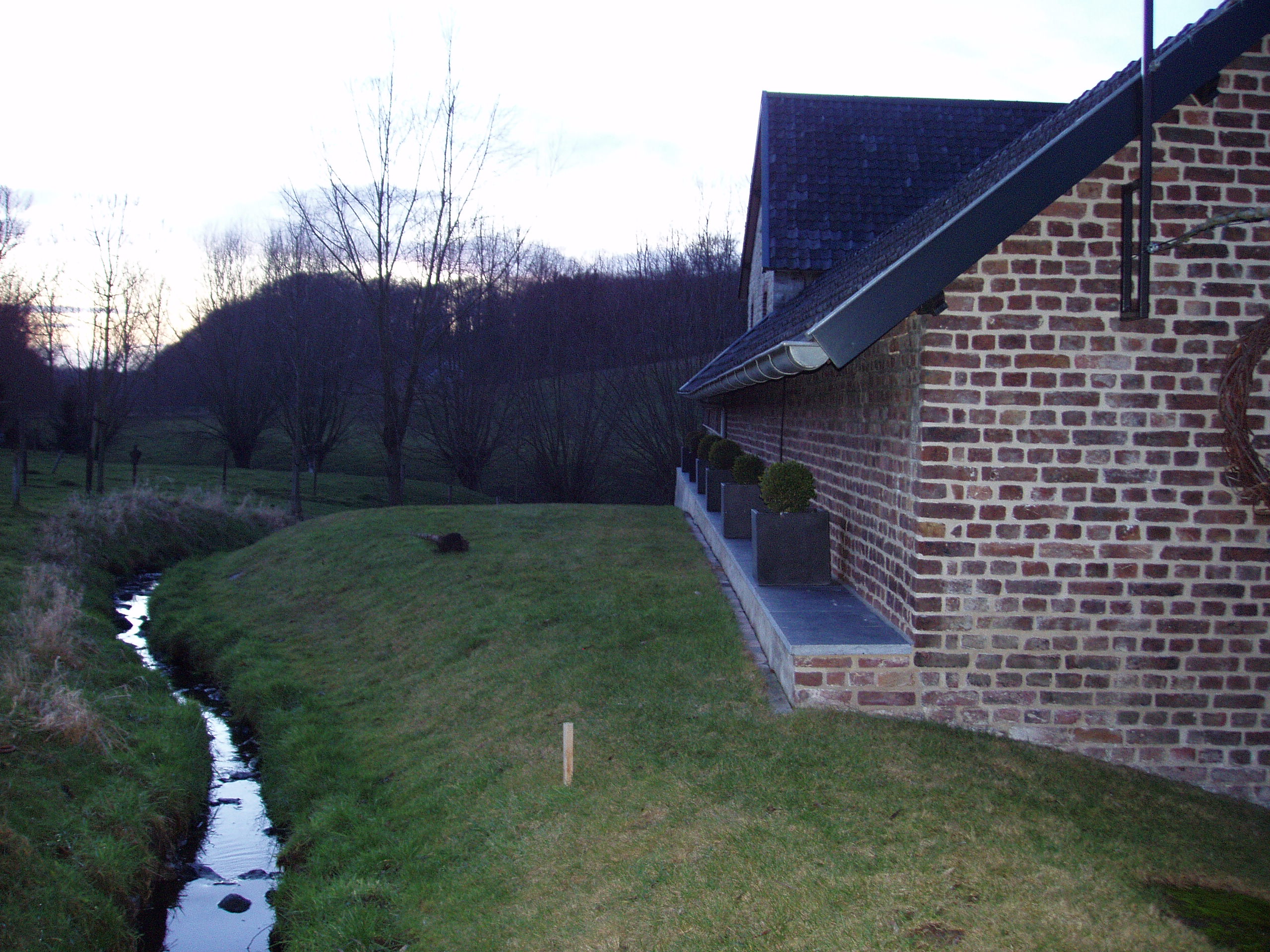
Eyserbeek stream and former mill race

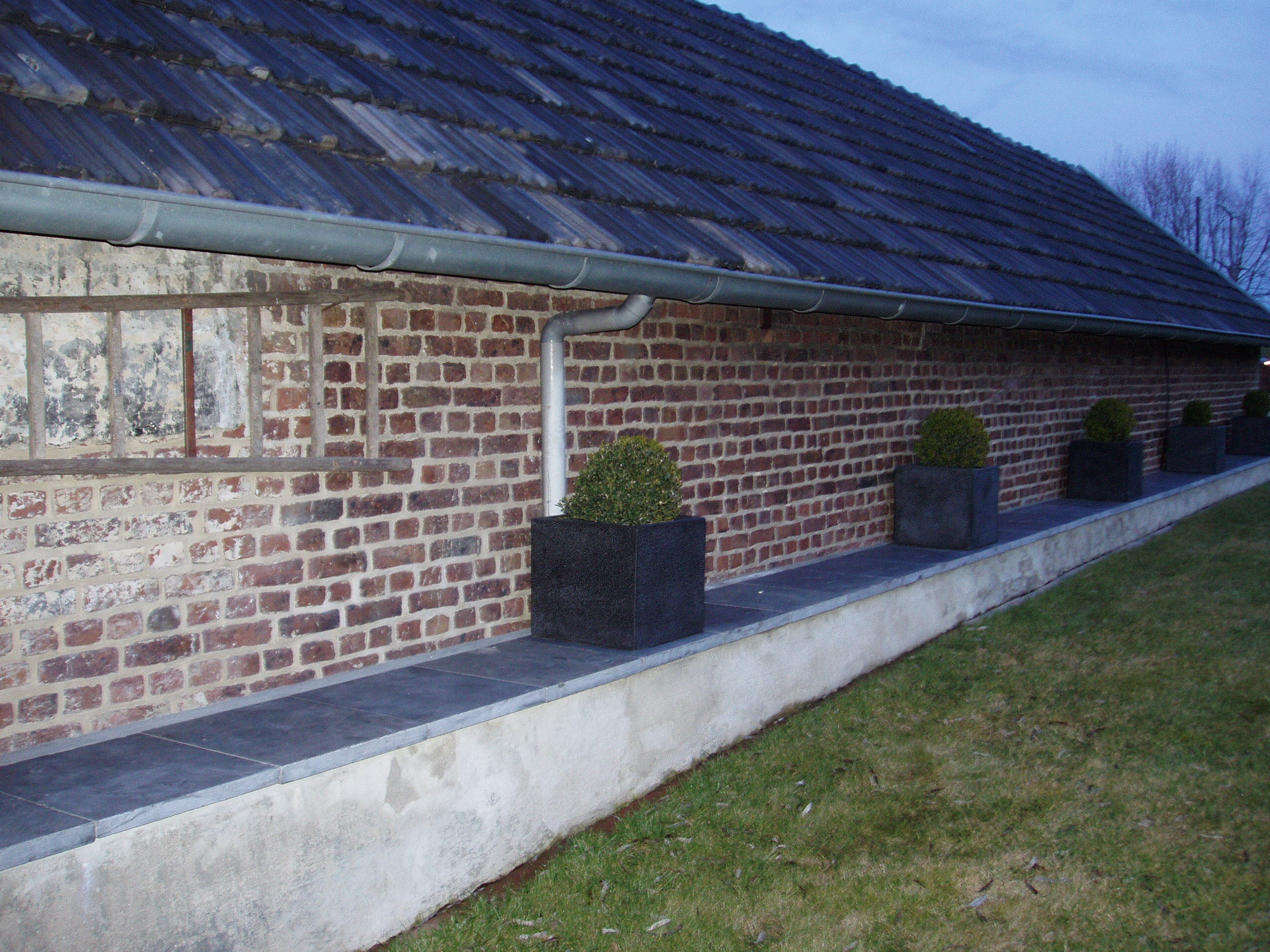
Former mill race

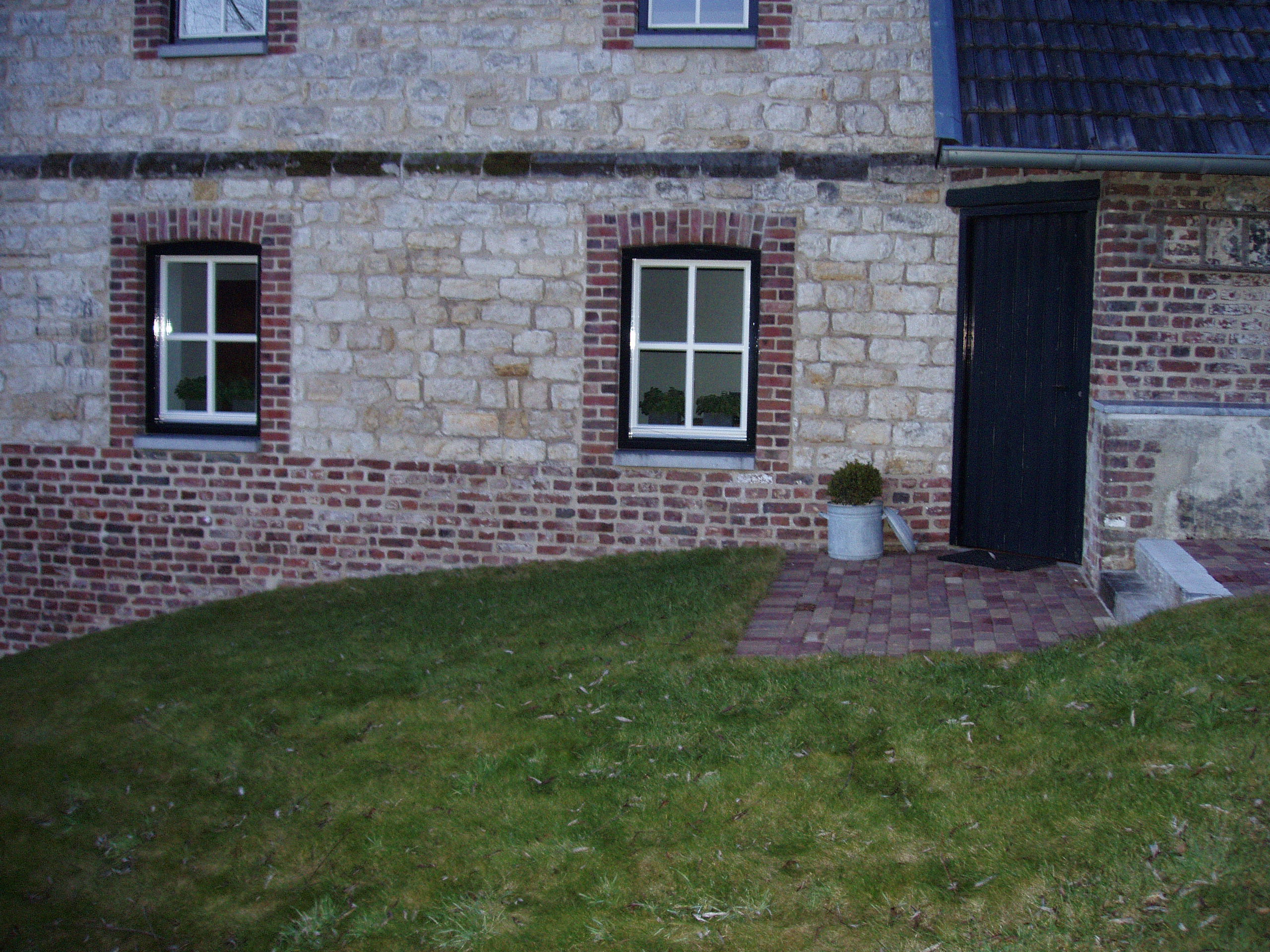
Location of the wheel

== See also ==
- Oude Molen, Simpelveld
