= Anderson's Mill, Smeaton =

Flour mill in Smeaton, Victoria, Australia

Anderson'sMill
Flour mill
- Current status: Standing, usage changed
- Structural system: Basalt
- Location: 9 Alice Street, Smeaton, Victoria, Australia
- Current tenants: Parks Victoria
- Coordinates: 37.340457°S 143.948321°E

Construction
- Built: c. 1861
- Floor count: 5

Anderson's Mill, Smeaton Victoria Australia Front View

Anderson's Mill, Smeaton Victoria Australia Rear View

Anderson's Mill is a large steam and water powered flour mill built in 1861 at Smeaton, Victoria, Australia on the banks of Birch Creek.

Brothers John, James and William Anderson migrated from New Cumnock in Ayrshire, Scotland, first to South Australia, in 1852, and then joined the gold rush at the Mount Alexander diggings in Victoria. They then established themselves as building contractors in Collingwood. They were joined by their mother Sarah and younger brothers Thomas, Robert and David in 1854. The older brothers moved to Dean near Creswick and embarked on a successful timber milling enterprise in the Bullarook Forest with sawmills at Dean, Barkstead and Adekate Creek.

John Anderson was prominent in the establishment in February 1861 of the "Farmers Joint Stock Flour Mill" by Smeaton farmers. Plans to build a mill fell through, but the Andersons determined that they would build their own flour and oat mill in June 1861. The five-story bluestone mill was completed and opened on 29 April 1862, with the oat milling section being completed by the following harvest season. The water wheel follows designs developed by John Smeaton, incorporating wrought iron spokes and cast iron hub and gears. The foundry patterns remained on site, with the original components having been cast by Hunt and Opie's Victoria Foundry in Ballarat. The water supply for the water wheel comes from Hepburn Lagoon, located about 5 km (3.1 mi) from the mill, and delivered via Birch Creek and a water race, with the last section in an wrought iron trough elevated on timber trestles. It is likely that John Anderson was responsible for the design of the mill, and the drafting of the drawings in the Latrobe Library, as he had been apprenticed in Scotland to a millwright.

In April 1862 the Creswick Advertiser announced: the building is full of flour and wheat and the whole although only recently completed presents already a very business like and busy appearance. The large water wheel constructed at a cost of £1 500 works well. And shortly after that the brothers intended: ...to shortly erect machinery for the manufacture of oatmeal making an addition to their extensive mill by erecting a building 40 foot by 35 foot.

In addition to the main mill John Anderson erected a bluestone oat drying kiln and also built a nine-room house and a workshop. Other buildings included a detached timber grain store built in the later 1860s behind the mill, a bluestone manager's office in front of the mill in 1869 and two timber stables in 1870s.

== Refitting as roller mill ==
David Anderson was responsible for the refit of the mill as a roller mill, using the latest equipment in 1896 and had relative success until his death in 1929. His widow then continued the operation, mainly producing oat products, pearl barley and split peas. Flour milling became a minor component after World War Two, along with a brief stint of ricena production, a rice substitute involving polished wheat. However, David Anderson and Co ceased business in 1959 and the mill finally closed with most of the machinery being sold for scrap, or to local farmers for grain cleaning.

== Closure and government acquisition ==
After closure the mill remained dormant for many years, but a report in 1979 advised that the site should be purchased by the Victorian Government due to its historical significance. Funding was obtained under the Bicentennial Authority and the State Government, with the mill acquired from the owners, Lyn Anderson and Shirley Meulan, in 1987 by the Department of Conservation, Forests and Lands. The site has been managed by Parks Victoria since 1996.

There is an annual Anderson's Mill Festival organized by Parks Victoria and Shire of Hepburn, which features traditional skills and demonstrations. The site is recorded on the Victorian Heritage Register.
