= Ali Bel Bicaj Tower House and Mill =

Cultural heritage monument of Kosovo

- Kulla dhe Mulliri i Ali Bel Bicaj (Albanian)
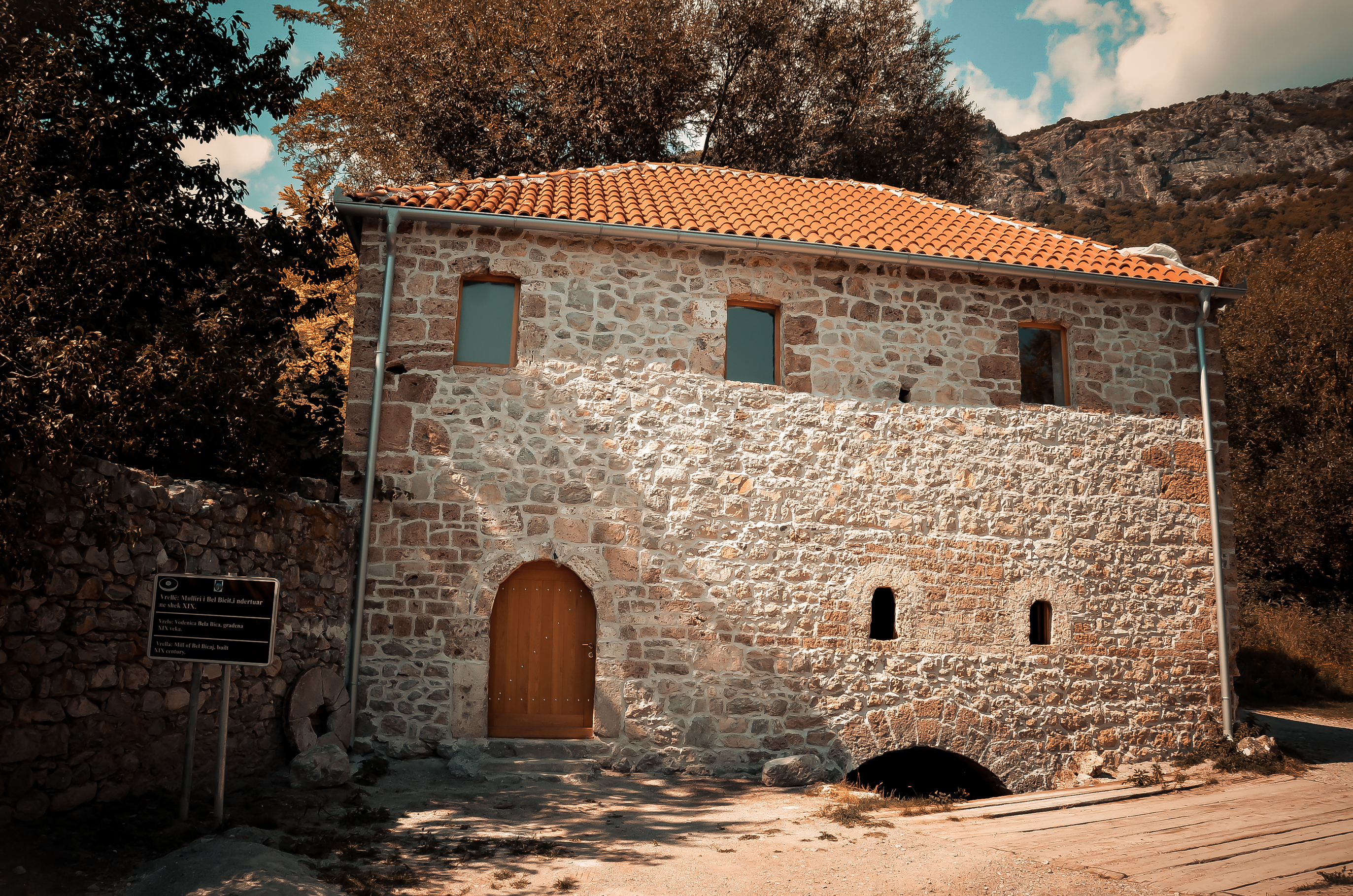
- Interactive map of Ali Bel Bicaj Tower House and Mill
- 42.7729°N 20.4005°E

History
- Built: 19th century

The Ali Bel Bicaj Tower House and Mill is a cultural heritage monument in Vrelo, Istog, Kosovo.

== History ==
The square watermill has long ground wheat and maize, and the roof is four stories. The floor was renovated in the 20th century. While the mill itself was used for grinding, the rest of the house served as both the owners’ quarters and as lodging for travelers. Out of use in recent times, the mill burned down during the Kosovo War in 1999, leaving only the outer walls. What remains was therefore listed under preservation as plot 70806008 – 251.
