= Eyserbeek =

Stream in Limburg, Netherlands

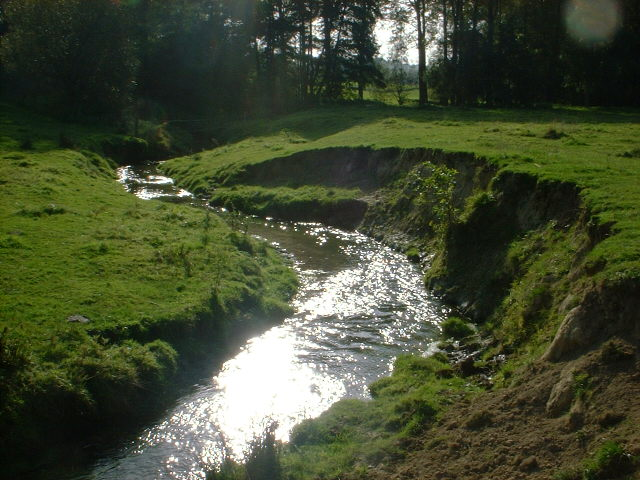
- The Eyserbeek at Eys

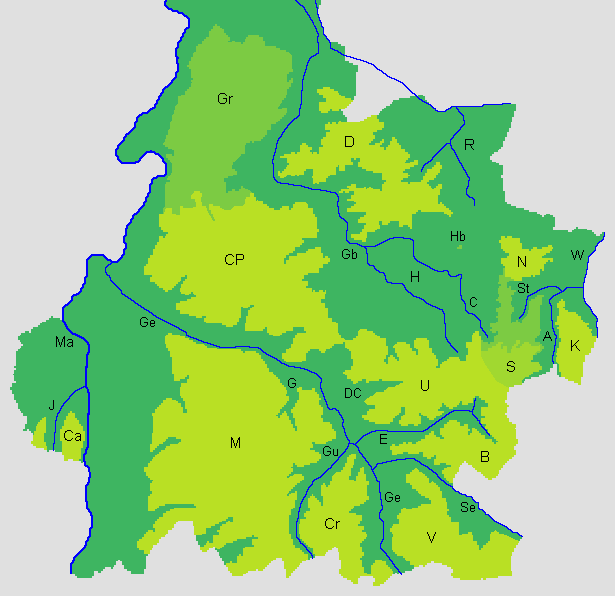
- The Eyserbeek (E) in South Limburg.

Location
- Country: Netherlands

Physical characteristics
- Source
  - location: near Bocholtz
- Mouth
  - location: Geul near Gulpen
  - coordinates: 50°49′13″N 5°53′56″E

Basin features
- Progression: Geul→ Meuse→ North Sea

The Eyserbeek (Dutch pronunciation: [ˈɛisərbeːk]; Limburgish: Ezerbaek [ˈeːzəʀbɛːk]) is a river in the province of Limburg, Netherlands. The Eyserbeek is a right-bank tributary to the river Geul, which later joins the Meuse. Rising in Bocholtz and flowing through Simpelveld and Eys, the Eyserbeek eventually drains in the river Geul in Gulpen. The Eyserbeek lies on the north of the plateau of Bocholtz and south of the plateau of Ubachsberg.

Sources of the Eyserbeek can be found in Bocholtz near Hoeve Overhuizen, from where it passes the N281 provincial road, before flowing through the town square of Simpelveld. In 2012 Simpelveld reorganised its town square, which used to cover the river, opening the river to view and creating a new riverbank with bluestone. The Eyserbeek then passes the monumental Oude Molen and Bulkemsmolen watermills, build in 1774 and 1753 respectively, before passing into the village of Eys, which was named after the river. The Eyserbeek eventually drains in the river Geul near the former Motte-and-bailey castle Gracht Burggraaf in Gulpen, where also the Gulp River joins the Geul from the opposite bank.

== Gallery ==
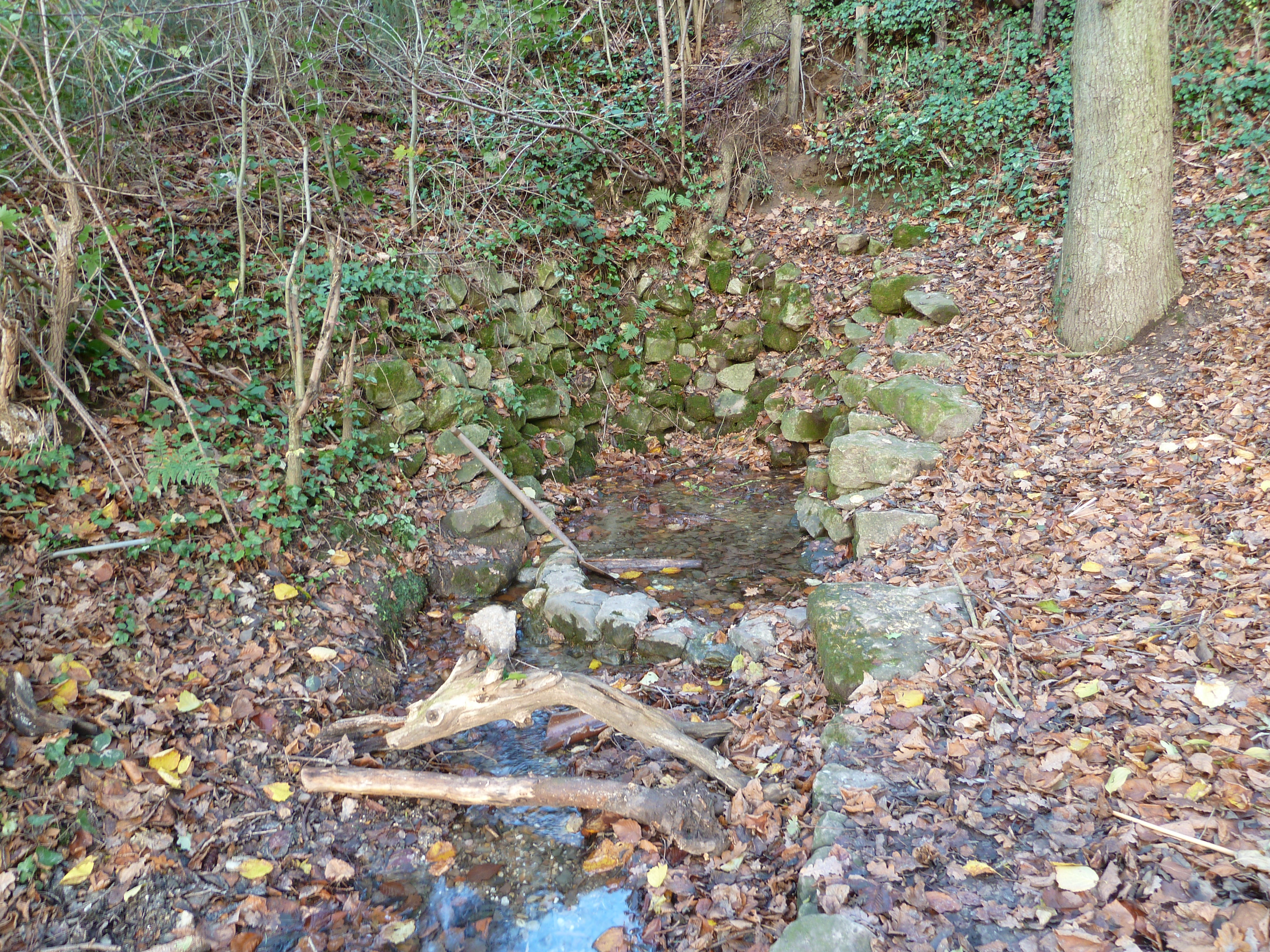
A source of the Eyserbeek at Bocholtz

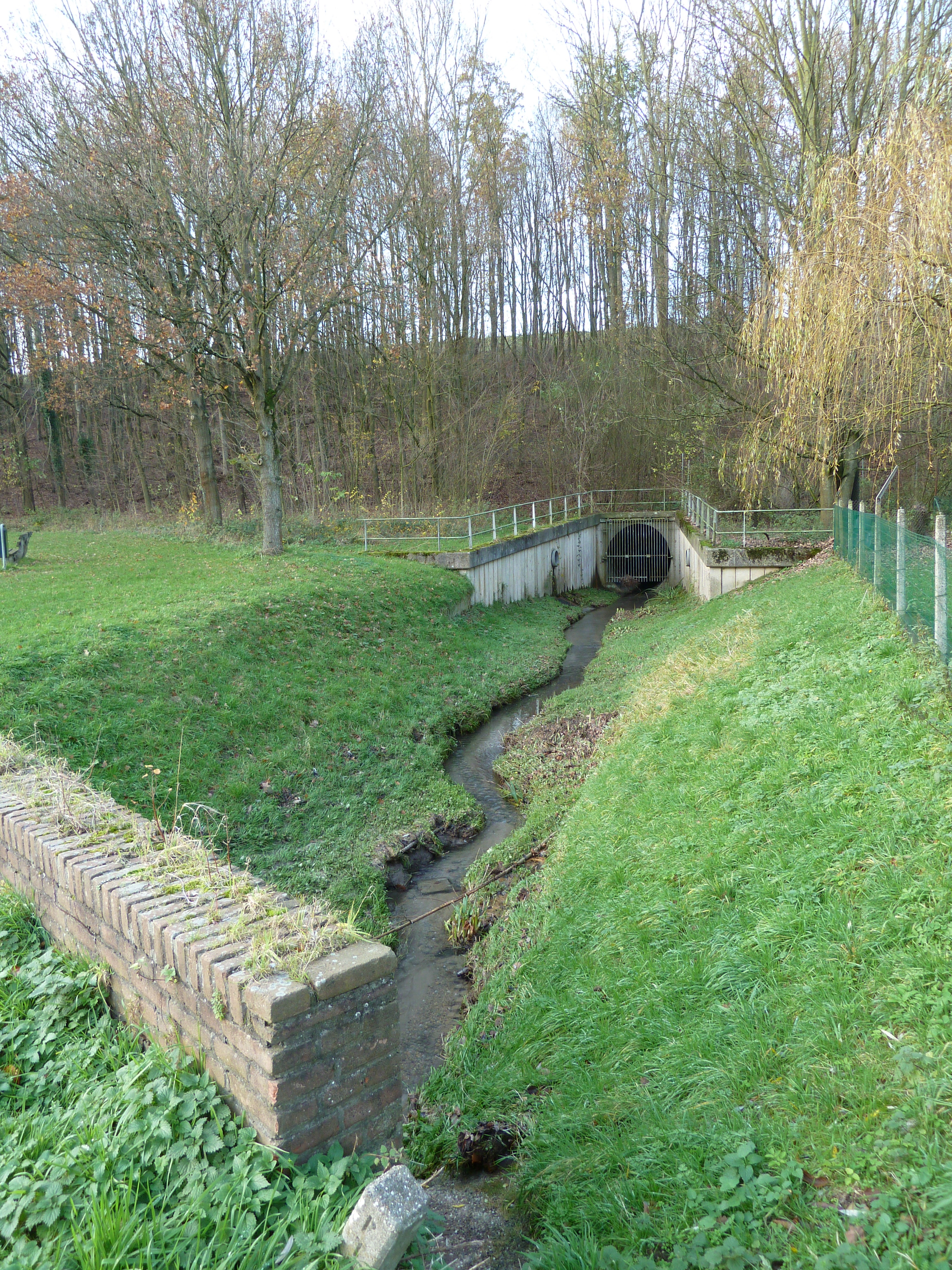
Eyserbeek passing the N281 provincial road

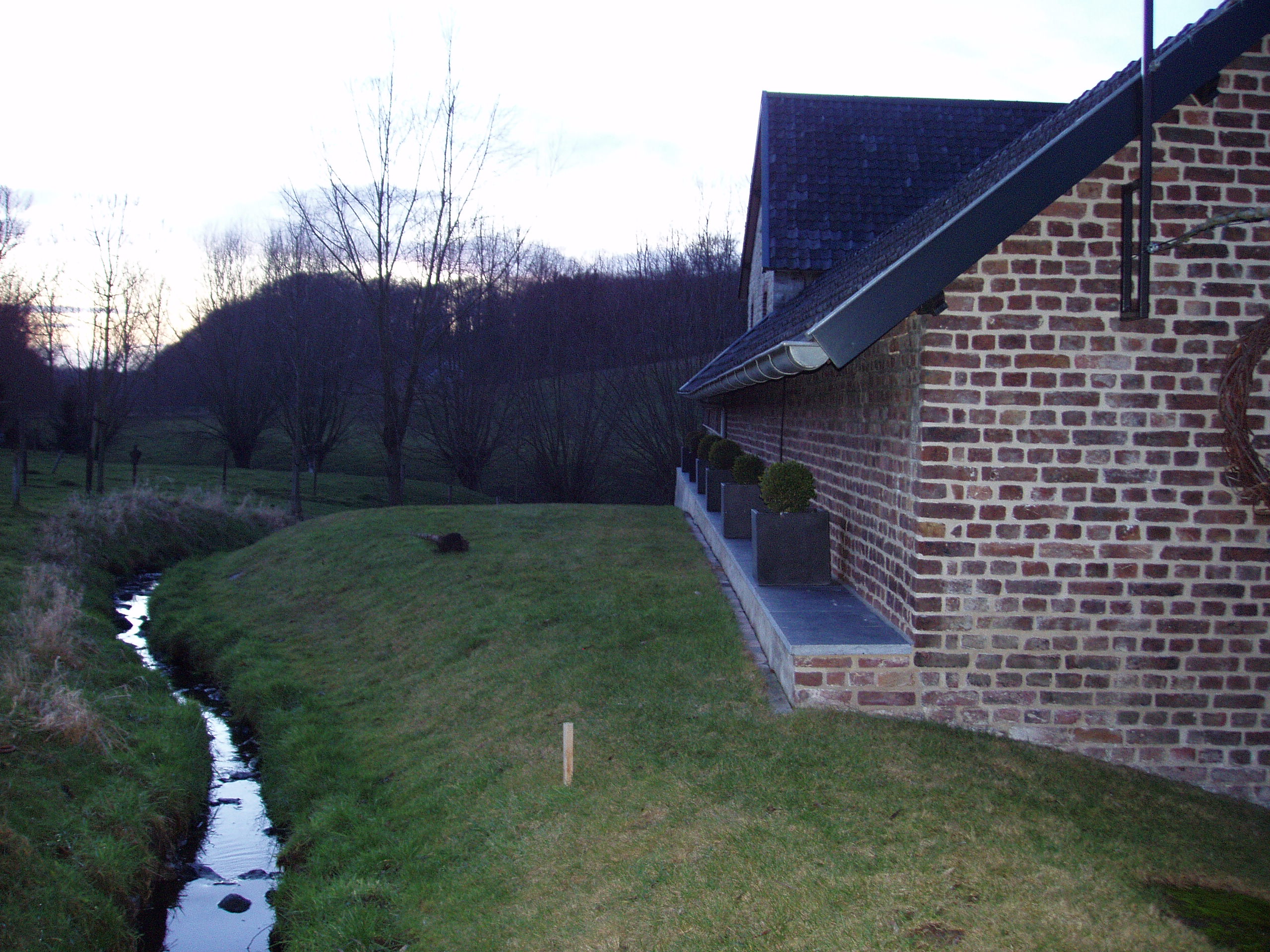
Eyserbeek and former mill race of the Bulkemsmolen

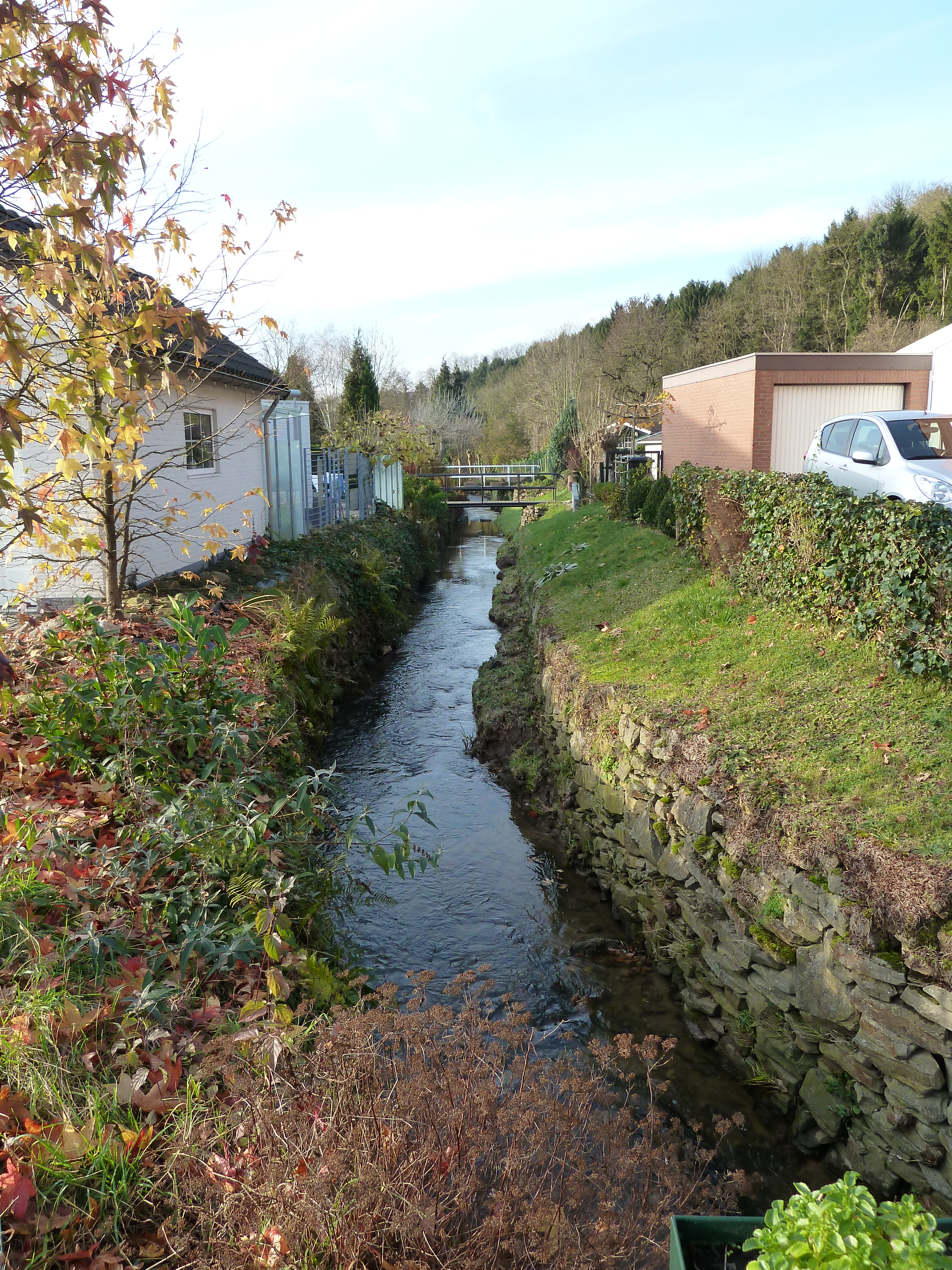
Eyserbeek at Eys
