= Oude Molen, Simpelveld =

Former watermill in Simpelveld, Netherland

Oude Molen
- Old Mill
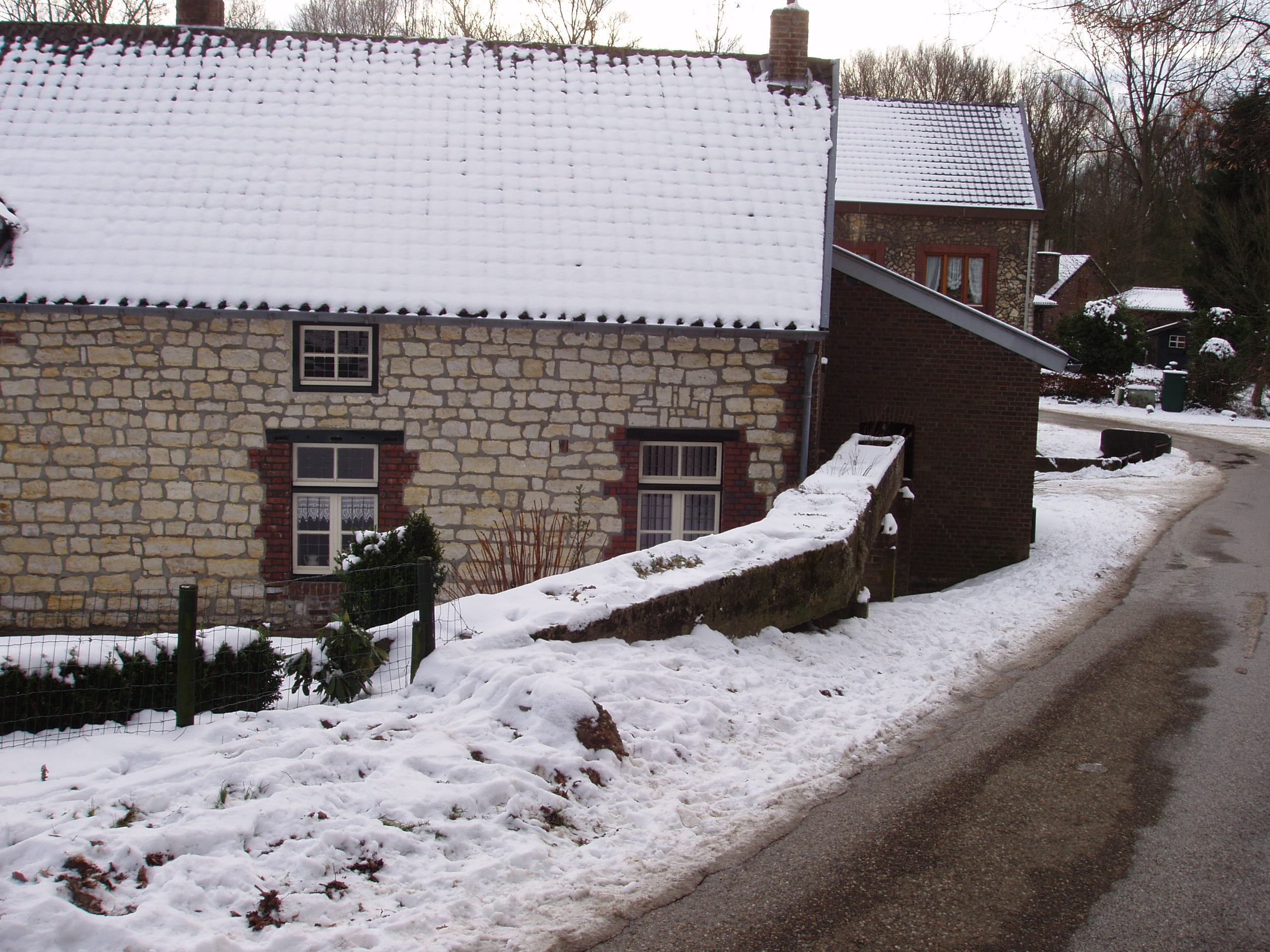
- Oude Molen in 2009
- Alternative names: Molen van Houben

General information
- Status: Rijksmonument (33593)
- Type: Watermill
- Address: Oude Molenweg 6
- Town or city: Simpelveld
- Country: Netherlands
- Coordinates: 50.8337°N 5.9717°E
- Completed: 1774
- Designations: House (1961-present); Gristmill (1774-1961)

References
- Database of Former Mills (in Dutch)

The Oude Molen (English: Old Mill) or Molen van Houben (English: Houben's Mill) is a watermill located on the Oude Molenweg 6 in Simpelveld, Netherlands. Built in 1774 along the Eyserbeek river, the watermill functioned as gristmill until the 1960s. During this time it was restored several times. In 1960 the mill stopped functioning, and a year later the land upstream was disowned by the local government. Currently it functions as housing.

The mill is a national monument (nr 33593). Of the original mill only the millhouse and the iron breastshot water wheel, with corresponding flume, remain.

== Gallery ==
Molen van Houben

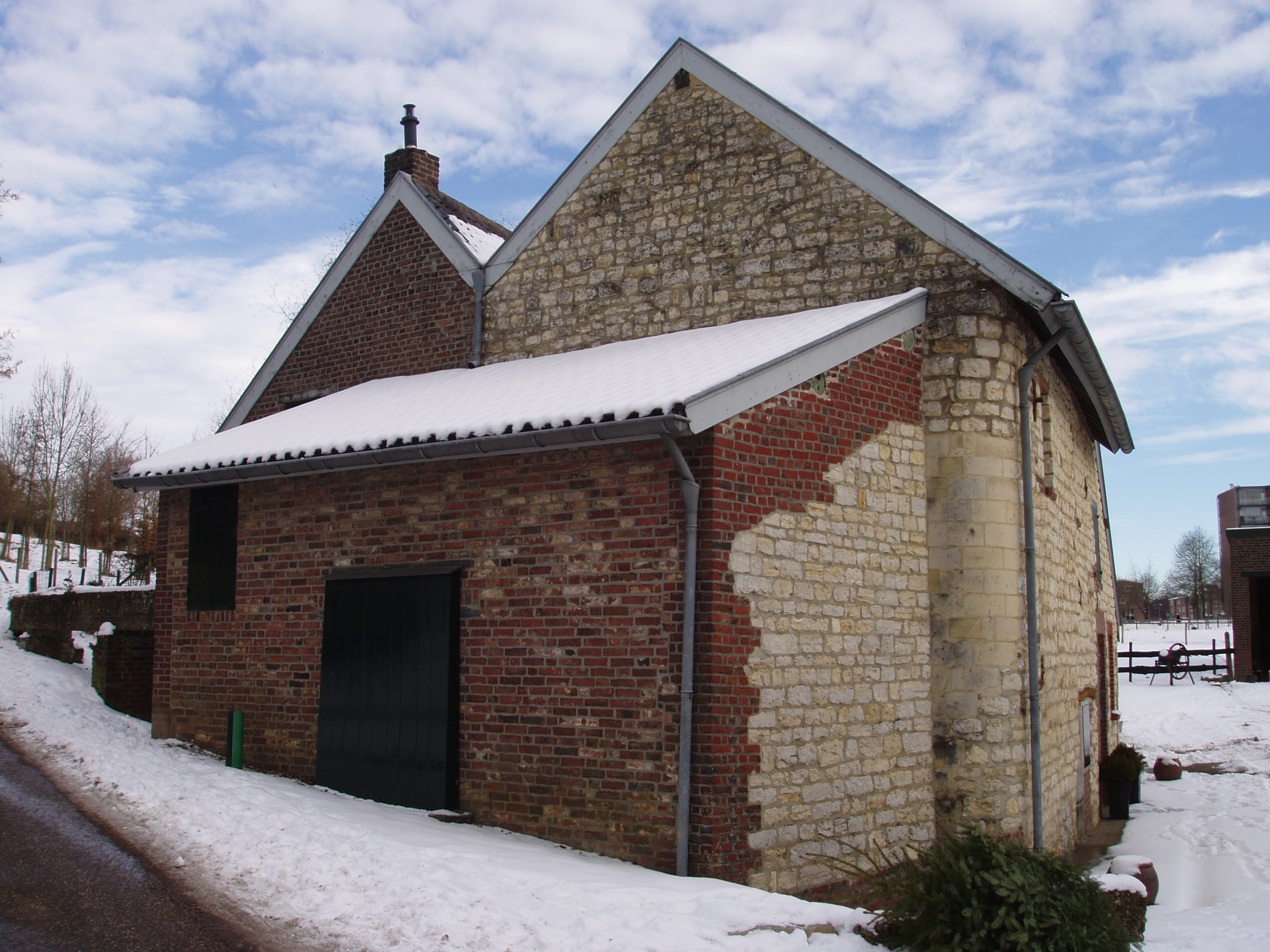
View from the west

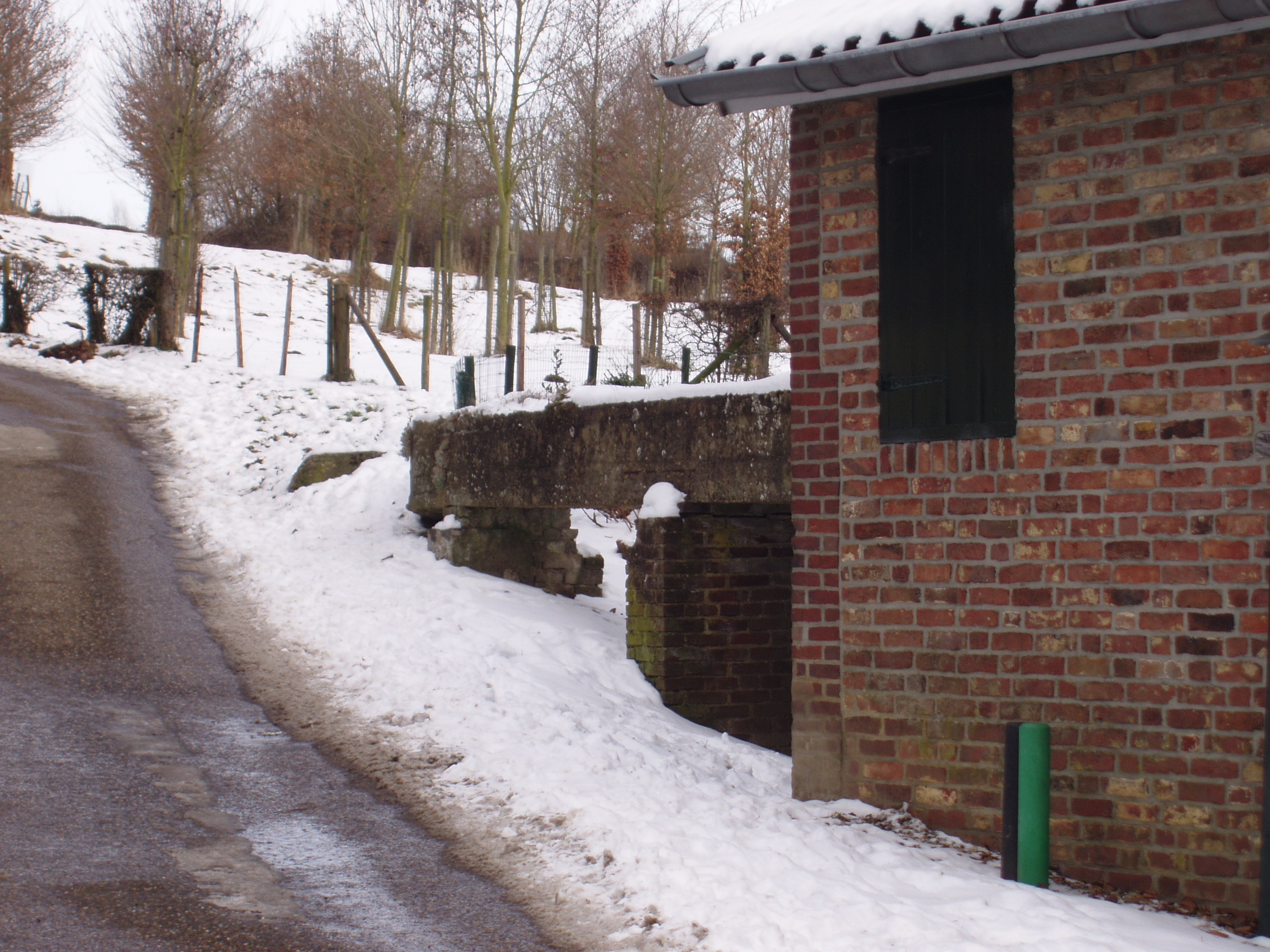
Flume and housing, viewed from the west

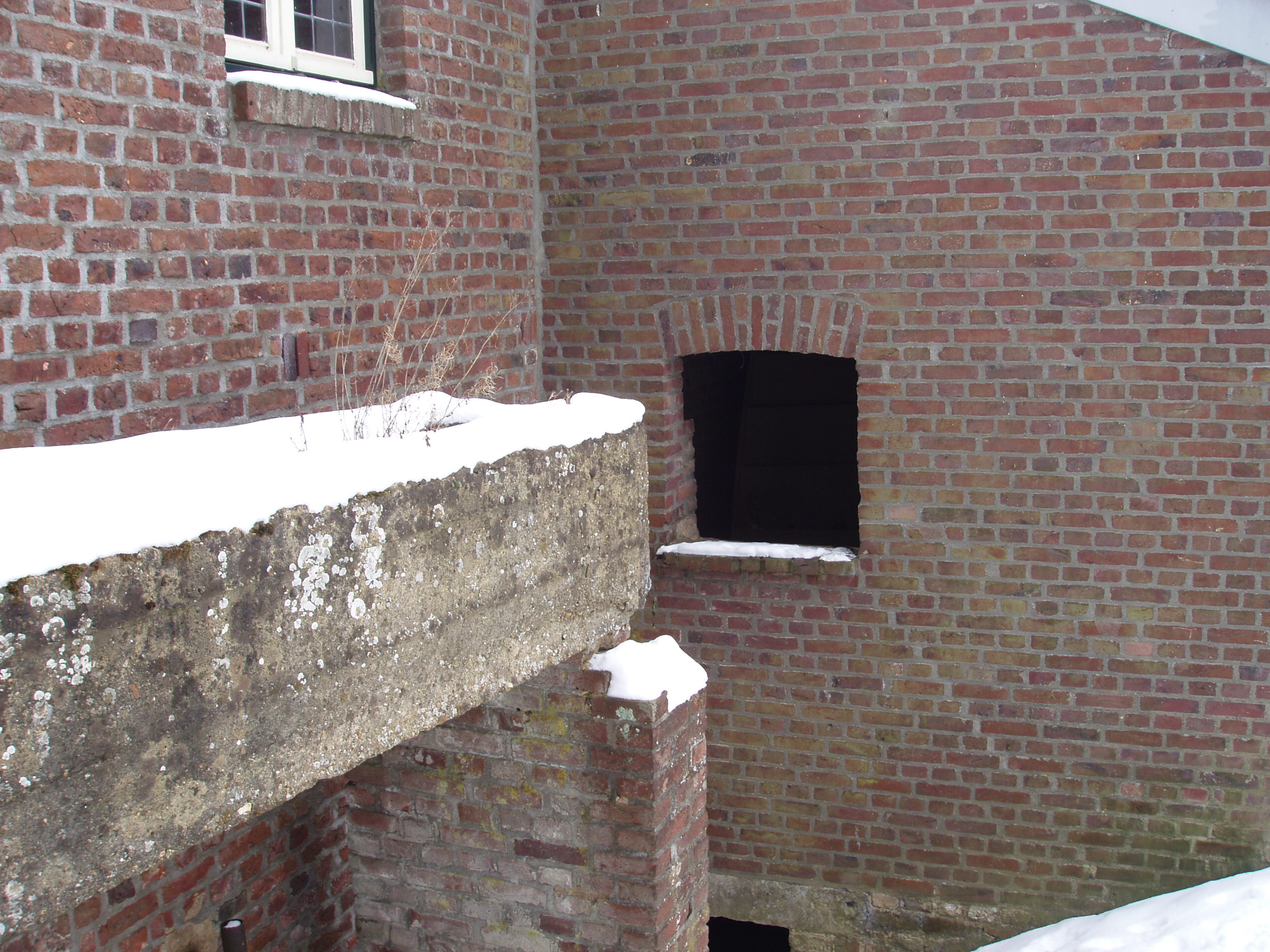
Flume

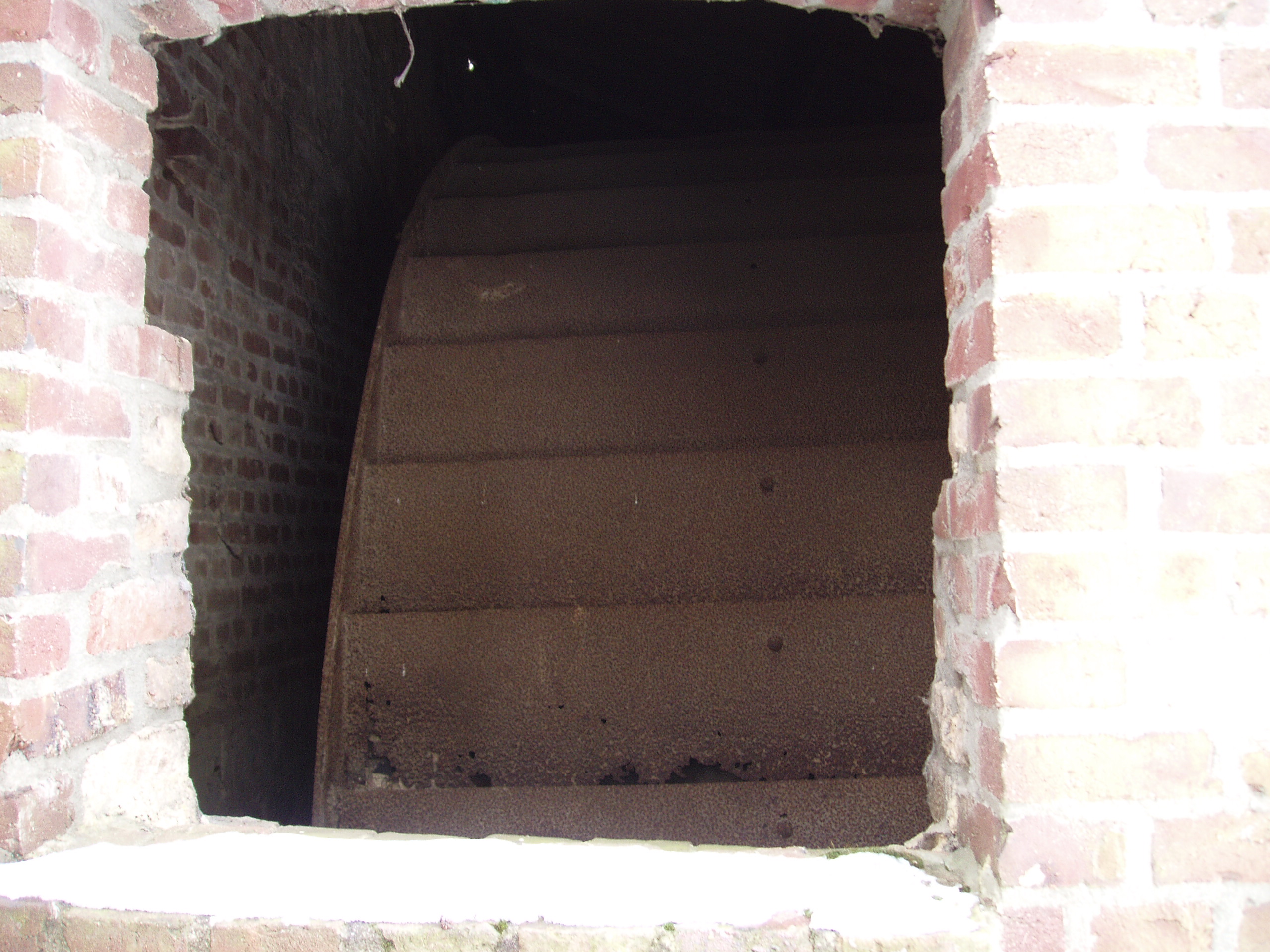
Water wheel

== See also ==
- Bulkemsmolen
