= Haslachmühle =

Landmarked historic flour mill in Salzburg, Austria

Coordinates: 47.8133°N 13.0822°E

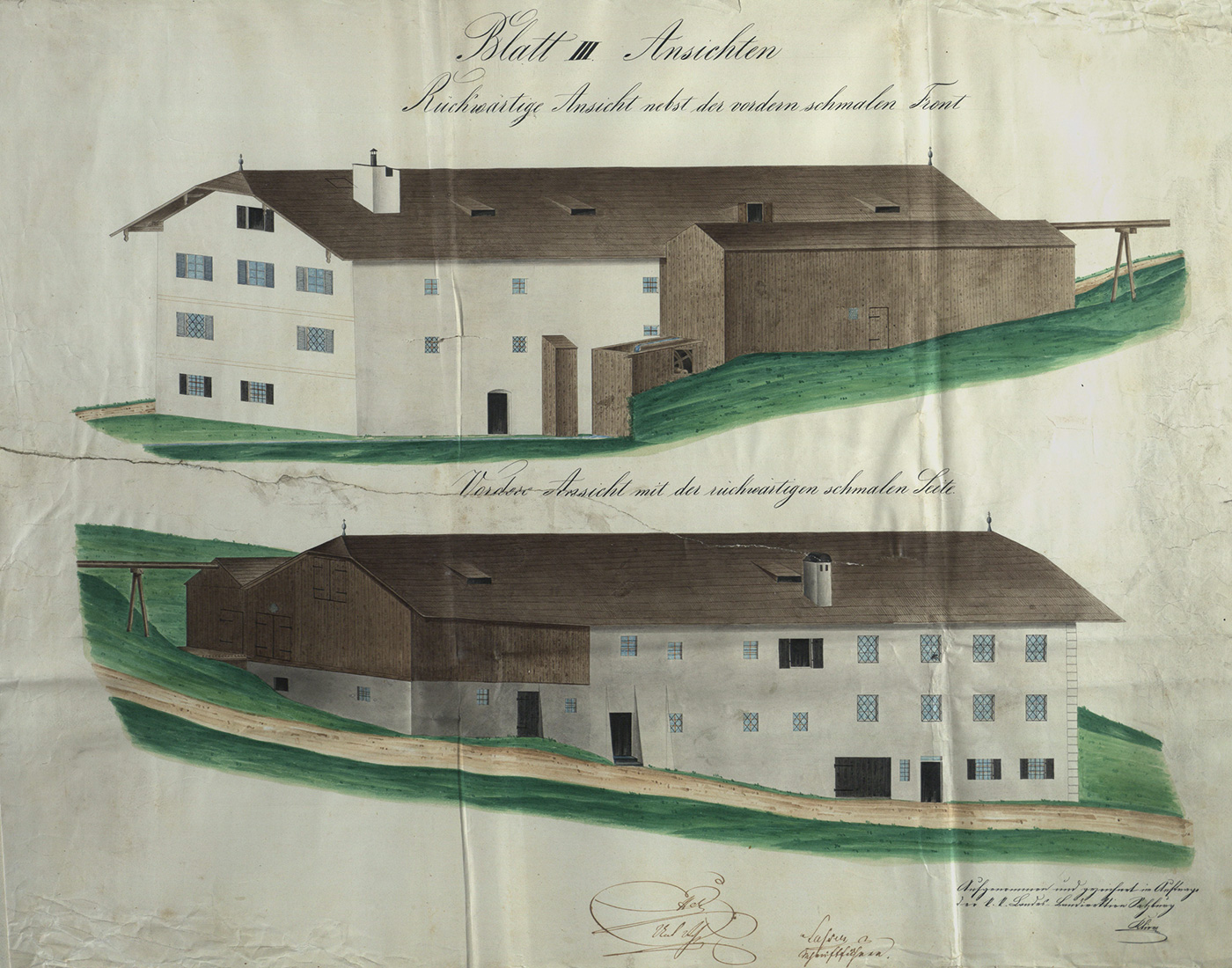
Drawings of the Haslachmühle from 1853

The Haslachmühle is a landmarked historic flour mill in Salzburgs urban district and former mill village Gnigl.

The building was first documented in 1577 as kleines Müllel im Haslach. Today's building was constructed in 1688 and was expanded during the last centuries. The mill is also known as Flöcknermühle and is private property of the family with the same name since the mid of the 19th century. It was powered by an overshot water wheel.

In 2014 a bed and breakfast was opened in the main building named Romantik Pension Die Haslachmuhle.

== Chapel Maria Luggau ==
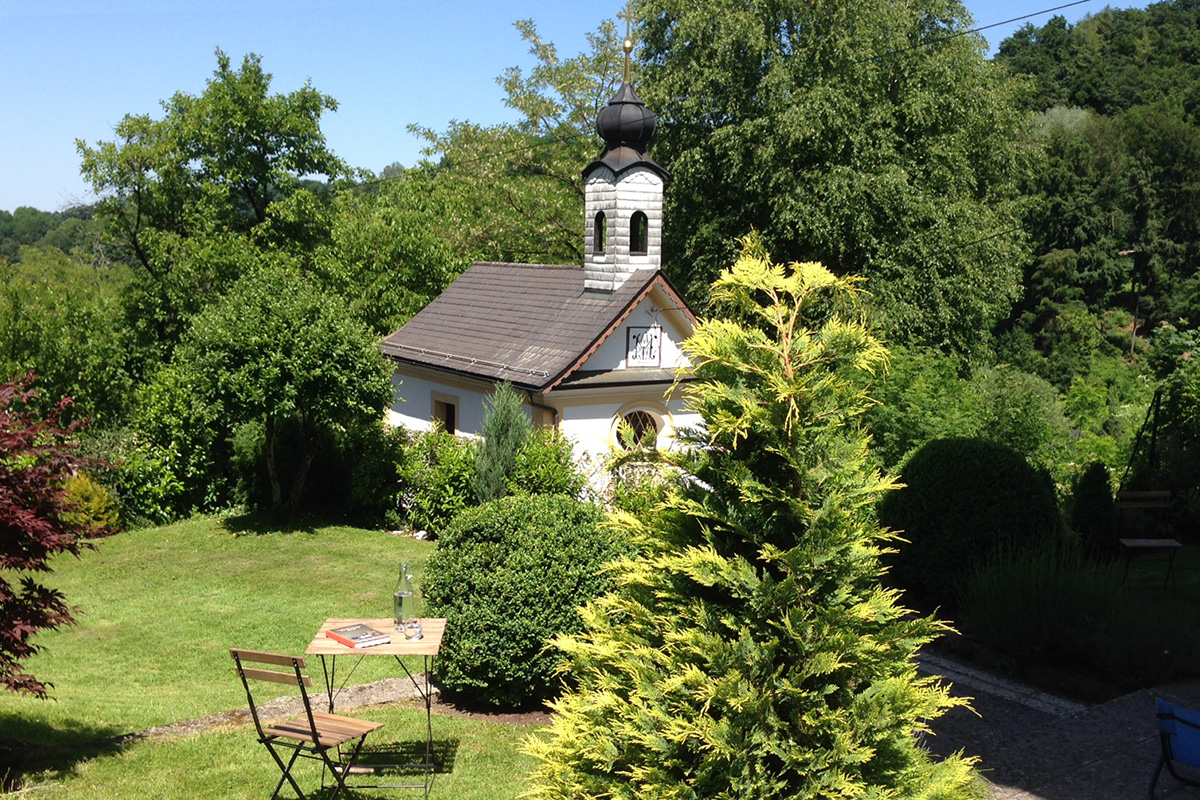
Chapel Maria Luggau, looking northwest from the garden of the Haslachmühle

In 1689 during the construction of a new house, a momentous accident happened. A scaffolding broke and seven workers fell into the ditch but as by a miracle nobody was hurt. As a result, the pious miller family vowed to build a small chapel in honour of Mary, mother of Jesus, assisted by the chapel's master builder. That master builder came from Carinthia or Lienz District, where a picture of the Blessed Virgin Mary of Luggau was adored by the people since 1513. A copy of this picture is in the centre of the altar and gave the name to the chapel. Despite the plain architecture, there are some fine artworks within the building. The chapel is situated along the famous pilgrim's way to St. Wolfgang at Lake Wolfgang.
