= Little Isabella =

Watermill in Groudle Glen, Isle of Man

Coordinates: 54°10′43″N 4°25′49″W

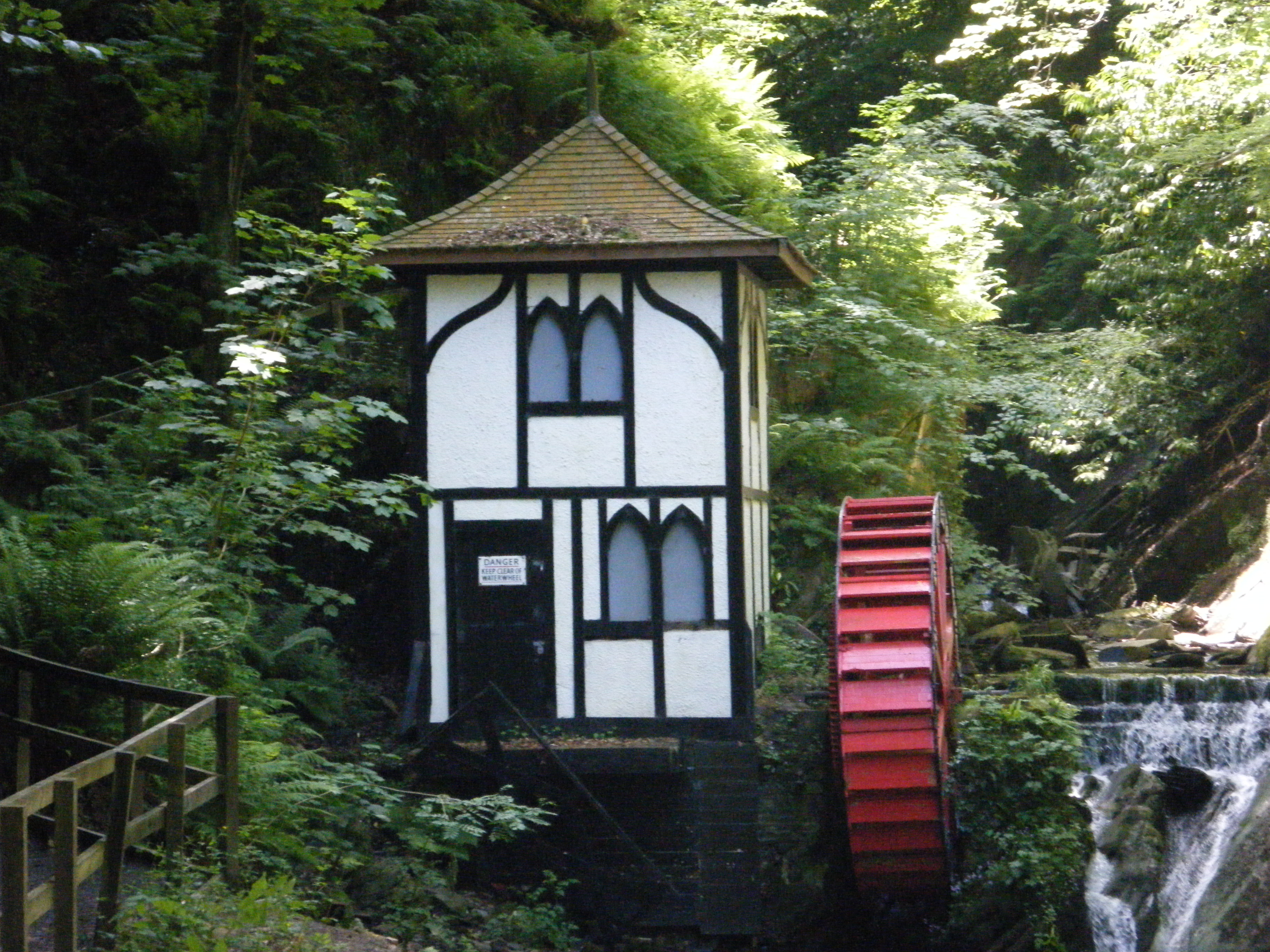
The "Little Isabella" water wheel in Groudle Glen

The Groudle Glen Water Wheel unofficially known by the sobriquet of Little Isabella is a rustic water wheel, situated in Groudle Glen on the Isle of Man, that was originally built in 1893 with the arrival of the Manx Electric Railway to the glen.

In its time the wheel has been used for various purposes, including pumping water to the Groudle Hotel (designed by Baillie Scott) and providing power for the fairy lights that ran through the glen from the entrance to Lhen Coan, the terminus of the Groudle Glen Railway. Latterly its function has become entirely aesthetic.

The wheel house was rebuilt in 1954 when the glen was enjoying something of a renaissance as a tourist attraction, and rumours abounded at this time that the wheel house was haunted. The wheel was featured, in a disguised form with a fictional name of Little Isabella, in a 1986 episode titled "Friends, Romans and Enemies" of the BBC series Lovejoy, in a story that led to buried treasure being discovered in one of the paddles. In 1994, the wheel was refurbished by Laxey Towing Co. Ltd. and re-opened to the fanfare music of Onchan Silver Band.

The Groudle Glen Water Wheel has operated sporadically in conjunction with train services on the nearby railway, but, following storms in October 2002, it was damaged and has subsequently been a purely static exhibit. In 2020, the wheel house was demolished and rebuilt and reopened in October 2020.
