= Smeaton, Victoria =

Smeaton
- Town
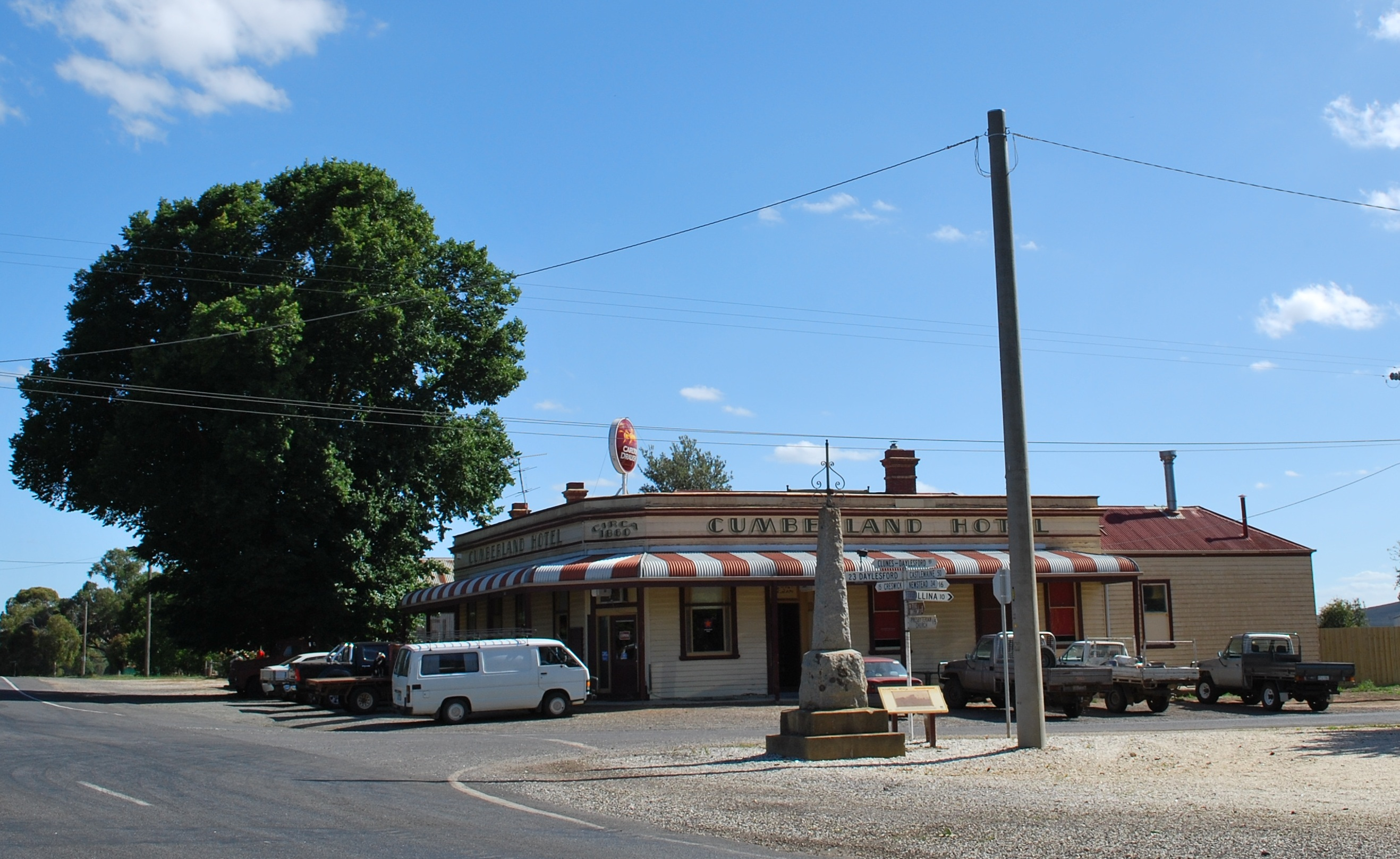
- The Cumberland Hotel at Smeaton (the oldest weatherboard pub in Victoria)

- Coordinates: 37°20′0″S 143°57′0″E
- Country: Australia
- State: Victoria
- LGA: Shire of Hepburn
- Location: 132 km (82 mi) NW of Melbourne; 32 km (20 mi) N of Ballarat; 14 km (8.7 mi) W of Creswick

Government
  - State electorate: Ripon
  - Federal division: Ballarat

Population
  - Total: 245 (2021 census)
- Postcode: 3364

Smeaton is a town in the Shire of Hepburn, Victoria, Australia. At the 2021 census, Smeaton had a population of 245.

== History ==
Smeaton is located on the lands of the Dja Dja Wurrung people.

The town was founded by Scottish settler Captain John Hepburn who was a colonial squatter in the 1840s. Hepburn held under Government licence about 20,000 acres (80 km^{2}) for his sheep and cattle run which he drove overland from Sydney. He built Smeaton House in 1849 with the assistance of British colonial migrants.

Smeaton House is a large homestead dating from the pre-gold rush era of Victoria. It was built for a member of the pastoral elite and includes separate servants' wings and family accommodation. It remains in private ownership.

Hepburn became a very high-profile figure in the district, promoted gold mines and became a Justice of the Peace before he died in 1860.

Smeaton Post Office opened on 21 June 1860 and closed in 1993.

Smeaton, in colonial times was once home to seven hotels, two bakeries, two banks and various shops. Now only the Smeaton Hotel, known as The Cumberland remains. Anderson's Mill was constructed in 1861-2 by John Anderson to mill flour and later oats.

Smeaton Primary School, which opened in 1861, closed at the end of the 2013 school year due to dwindling student numbers.

Smeaton is now home to two large seed and grain processors, one of which is a very large exporter of value added pulses, grains and seeds and is currently building a new oat mill to process an additional 60,000 tonne of oats a year.

A local online newsletter and blog, run by the local community, with information and photos of the town's and more recent events, can be found online.

== Demographics ==
The 2021 census found that of the population of 245, 124 were male and 115 were female. The median age was 51, compared to the national median of 38. A breakdown of resident heritage showed that 30.2% claimed Australian heritage, 44.5% English heritage, 16.7% Scottish, 16.3% Irish and 5.3% Dutch. However, 82% of residents were born in Australia; the other top responses for country of birth were England 4.5% and New Zealand and South Africa 1.6%. The most common response for religion was "No Religion" (44.5%).
