= Wanze Sugar Factory =

Belgian sugar factory

Coordinates: 50°31′45″N 5°12′27″E

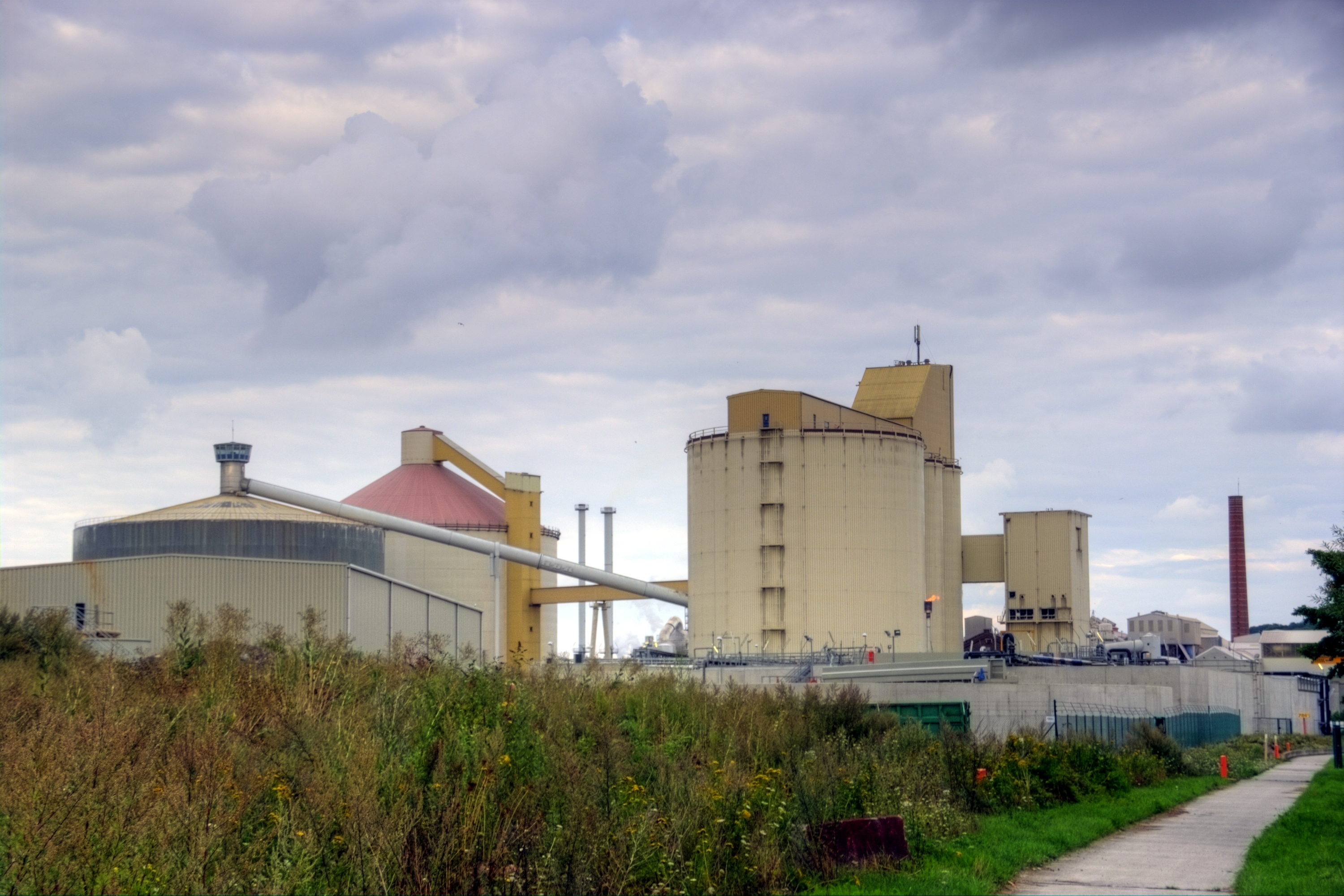
- Wanze Sugar Factory in 2010

- Location within Belgium
- Built: 16 May 1870
- Operated: Since 1870
- Location: Wanze and Longchamps, Belgium
- Owner: Raffinerie Tirlemontoise

The Wanze Sugar Factory was founded by the Sucreries Centrales SA. It is located in Wanze and is currently owned by Raffinerie Tirlemontoise. Wanze Sugar Factory is the only European sugar factory that still uses an outlying râperie connected by a pipeline. The râperie in Longchamps is located 23 km west of the central factory.

== History ==
=== The central factory model ===
In the 19th century, freight transport by road was very expensive. For factories depending on roads, this put a very narrow limit on the distance at which it was still economical to transport sugar beet. This limit was about 5–6 km. Therefore, there were a lot of small sugar factories. E.g. in Hainaut Province alone, there were about 90 sugar factories in 1877. As beet contained only about 10% sugar, the idea to split the production process came up. The extraction of the raw juice from the beet would be done in a râperie close to the farm. Only the raw juice would then be transported over a longer distance. A large central factory would be able to do the final processing at lower cost.

In 1867 the idea was implemented by building a sugar factory in Montcornet, Aisne and a râperie at a distance of 8 km. The two were connected by means of an underground pipeline that transported the raw juice.

=== Sucreries Centrales (1870–1887) ===
The company that would build Wanze Sugar Factory was known as Sucreries Centrales. It was founded by contract on 16 May 1870. It would have its headquarters in Liège. The goal of the company was to establish one or more central sugar factories connected by pipeline to outlying râperies, as well as engaging in all possible other industrial and trade activities in the sugar industry. The initial share capital was 2,000,000 belgian francs in 4,000 shares of 500 francs.

The initial management of the Sucreries Centrales might have been a bit heavy.

The executive management (administrateurs) consisted of:

- Baron Gustave Mincé du Fontbaré
- Léon Pirlot-Jamar
- Baron Charles Whetnall
- Ignace Douxchamps
- Joseph Fraipont
- Charles Delloye-Lamarche
- Antoine de Fortempts de Loneux

The supervisory board (commissaires) consisted of:

- Comte Charles d'Oultremont
- Baron Théodore de Woelmont
- Isidore Ghion
- Camille Moncheur
- Baron Charles de Potesta

By the time the company was founded, it had probably already decided on the Wanze location. In July 1870 potential contractors were invited to view the plans (cahier des charges) for a sugar factory in Wanze. In December 1870 potential contractors for the delivery and installation of 30 kilometers of pipeline were called upon.

The central factory was built on a terrain of the Hospices Civils de Huy in Wanze. This is a municipality on the north bank of the Meuse, facing Huy. The central factory was connected to râperies located on the plateau of Hesbaye, where the sugar beet were grown.

By February 1872 the central factory was connected to 5 râperies. That of Longchamps (Éghezée) was 23 km away. The others were at Burdinne (12 km), Vissoul (9 km), Moha (3 km), and Chapon-Seraing (10 km). Two of these communicated by telegraph, the others by regular messengers. At the time, 3 new râperies were under construction. The factory could process 9–10,000 hectoliter of raw juice per day. It could not process sugar beet, but it was planned to get a diffusing station for 20,000 t of beet to be used in the approaching campaign. The beet for this diffusing station would be brought in by boat over the Meuse.

The Sucreries Centrales was not successful. In December 1886 it became known that the company had been sold to Paul Wittouck for 4,000,000 Francs.

=== Sucreries centrales de Wanze (1887–1927) ===
After the sale of the company, or really its assets, to Paul Wittouck, the shareholders agreed to liquidate the Sucreries Centrales.

A new company "Sucreries centrales de Wanze" was then founded. It got a share capital of 2,000,000 Francs divided in 4,000 privileged shares of 500 Francs and 4,000 shares without a designated value. The executive board consisted of Paul Wittouck; Alban Poulet, banker, and Baron Gustave Mincé du Fontbaré. Godefroid Piesseria and Ernest de Moerloose were appointed to the supervisory board of the new company.

The liquidators of the Sucreries Centrales in liquidation got 3,979 privileged shares in exchange for the central factory and the râperies. The pipelines were sold separately for 2,000,000 Francs in new bonds. The bonds of the old Sucreries Centrales could be exchanged at the ratio of five old bonds for two 500 Franc bonds of the new Sucrerie centrales de Wanze and two 500 Franc bonds of the Sucreries de Breda et Berg op Zoom.

The new company set about on a complete modernization of the installations. It also built a 14th râperie, that of Wanze itself, which could process 700 t of beet per day. In 1888, a description of the factory was published. It could process 30,000 hectoliter of raw juice per 24 hours. Highlights were the impressive carbonatation hall and the big quadruple effect evaporators. Within a few months Paul Wittouck and Böhrig & König from Magdeburg succeeded in raising the daily capacity to 2,000 t of beet per day. It made Wanze Sugar Factory the biggest sugar factory of the world.

Also in the late 1880s, the water supply on the plateau of Hesbaye became a cause of concern for the company. The râperies all had steam engines, and so did the pumping stations. The râperies were in Perwez, Ramillies, Longchamps, Burdinne, Vissoul, Moha, Warnant-Dreye, Chapon-Seraing, Viemme, Lens-Saint-Remy, Waremme, Mechelen-Bovelingen (Marlinne), Bergilers. There were pumping stations in Bierwart, Hambraine, Lavoir and Villers-le-Bouillet. At the time the râperie at Longchamps was already important. The company also had a small sugar factory at Waremme.

In 1896 the privileged shares and normal shares were exchanged for 8,000 new shares of 1,000 Franc each. The 6% interest on privileged shares had been paid up to 1896 while the rest of the profit had been reserved. From 1895 to 1911 the factory paid a steady high dividend.

=== The end of the company ===
Paul Wittouck and his brother Franz Wittouck acquired the Raffinerie Tirlemontoise in 1894.

In 1928, the company Sucreries centrales de Wanze was merged into the Raffinerie Tirlemontoise.

== The Wanze Sugar Factory ==
=== Dismantling of most of the central factory system ===
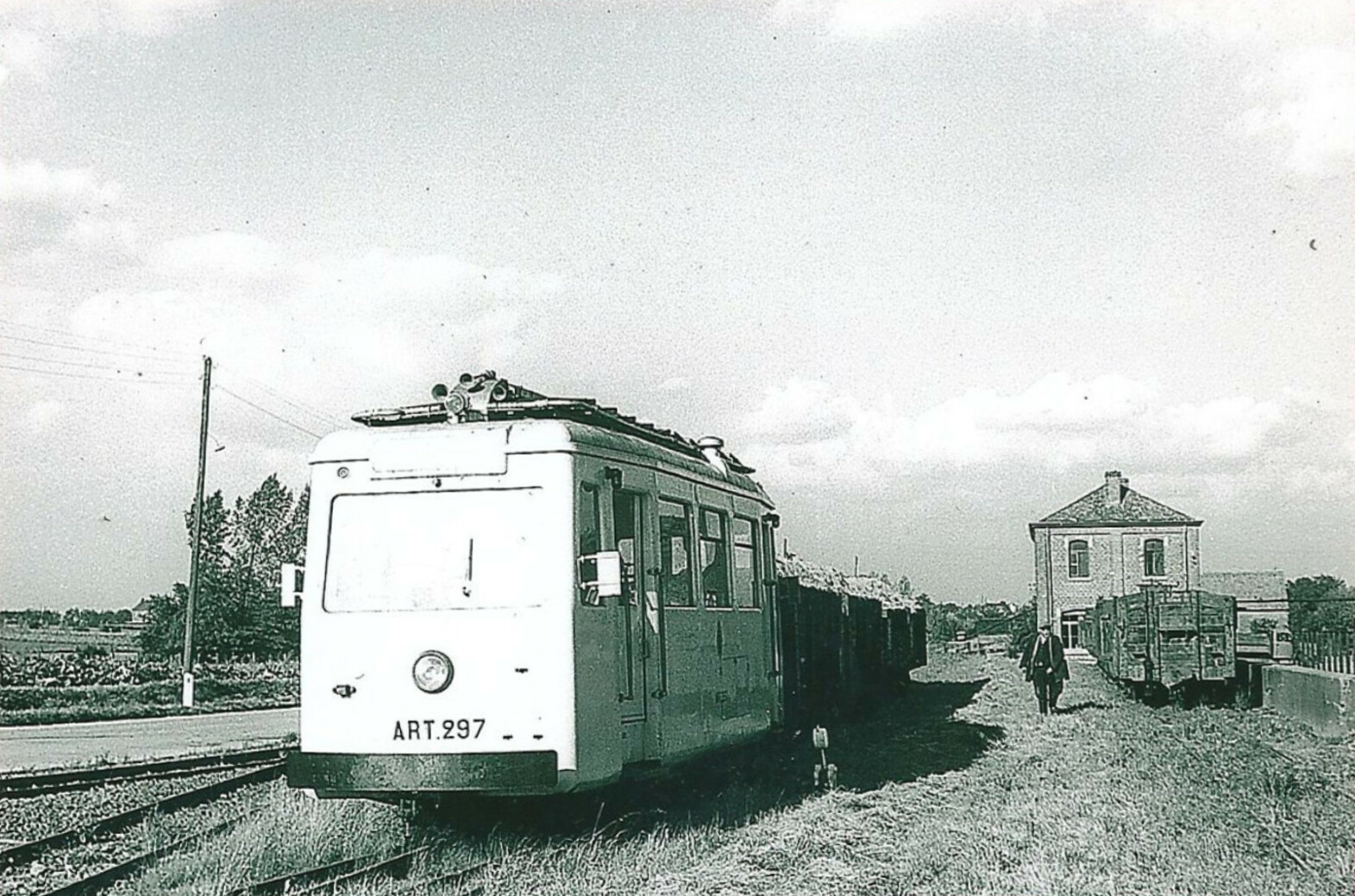
Automotrice with beet near Hannêche râperie c. 1949

During the twentieth century, the cost of road transport decreased due to better roads and steadily more powerful trucks. For the heavy sugar beet it took some time before this made the central refinery - râperie system obsolete. Râperies that were destroyed in World War I were often rebuilt. In time the truck won, but this was probably only the case after World War II.

The râperie in Warnant-Dreye closed down in 1925. The râperie in Vissoul closed down in 1948. The râperie in Chapon-Seraing on Rue de Mavoie closed down in 1955. The buildings have been renovated. The râperie in Mechelen-Bovelingen was closed down in 1956, the building still stands. The râperie de Hannêche (a.k.a. Burdinne) was closed down in 1958. An administrative building might still be standing. The râperie in Perwez on Avenue de Rosaie was shut down in 1959. A part of it survived and is now a restaurant.

=== Today (2023) ===
The Wanze Sugar Factory is now a production location of the Raffineries Tirlemontoise. It is the only European sugar factory that still has an operational râperie.

== Sources ==
- Liste générale des fabriques de sucre, vol. Campagne 1877–78, Bureaux du Journal des Fabricants de Sucre, 1878
- "Faits Dives". La Meuse. 13 June 1870.
- "Société Anonyme". La Meuse. 11 July 1870.
- "Sucreries centrales". La Meuse. 10 December 1870.
- "Faits Divers". Le Bien Public. 26 March 1872.
- Horsin-Déon (1888), "Les Sucreries en France et a L'Etranger", Association des chimistes et ingénieurs de sucreries..., VI
- Rutot, A. (1889), "Description Géologique et Hydrologique des puits et des forages creusés par la ste anonyme des sucreries centrales de Wanse", Bulletin de la Société belge de géologie, de paléontologie et d'hydrologie, III, Polleunis, Ceuterick et De Smet, Bruxelles: 82–109
- "Chronique Locale". La Meuse. 17 December 1886.
- "Chronique Locale". La Meuse. 28 January 1887.
- "Chronique Locale". La Meuse. 23 April 1887.
- "Chronique Locale". La Meuse. 25 April 1887.
- "Advertisements". La Meuse. 4 August 1887.
- Recueil financier, Bruylant, Bruxelles & Boyveau et Chevillet, Paris, 1913
- "Raffineries Tirlemontoise". De Maasbode. 25 October 1928.
- "Venez rendre visite à la Râperie de Longchamps le 6 octobre 2013". Raffinerie Tirlemontoise. 2013. Archived from the original on 7 May 2018.
- Moigno, F. (1872), "Industrie Sucrière", Cosmos, les Mondes; revue hebdomadaire des sciences, XXVII: 5–10
- Schoefs, Jos (2023). "De bieten raperie". Heers en zijn 12 kerkdorpen.
- "Râperie - Vissoul vers 1940". Bibliotheca Burdinne. 2023.
- "Râperie de Hannêche". Bibliotheca Burdinne. 2023.
- "Histoire des villages". Villers-le-Bouillet. 2023. Archived from the original on 14 March 2023.
- "Balade entre deux gares" (PDF). Commune de Perwez. 2017.
- "Circuit autour du château de Seraing-le-Château". 2023.
- "De Grootste Ruwsuikerfabriek der Wereld" [The biggest raw sugar factory of the world]. Bataviaasch Handelsblad. 15 March 1888.
