= Knoppel =

Knoppel or Knöppel may refer to:

- De Knoppel, nature reserve in Belgium
- Knöppel (band), Swiss punk rock band
- Knöppel (surname)
