= Mechelen (disambiguation) =

Mechelen may refer to:

In Flanders, Belgium

- Mechelen, a city in Antwerp province
  - Archbishopric of Mechelen-Brussels, an Ecclesiastical Province; the Roman Catholic Primatial See in Belgium
  - K.V. Mechelen, a football club
  - Lordship of Mechelen, and independent Lordship within Habsburg-controlled Low Countries (until 1795); one of the original Seventeen Provinces
  - Mechelen transit camp, a detention and deportation camp operating during the Nazi occupation
- Maasmechelen, a municipality in the province of Limburg
  - Mechelen-aan-de-Maas, a village within the municipality of Maasmechelen
  - Mechelen incident, a pre-World War II incident (January 1940) whereby a German bomber made a forced landing in Belgium
- Mechelen-Bovelingen, a village in the municipality of Heers, in the province of Limburg
- Kwaadmechelen, a village in the municipality of Ham, in the province of Limburg

In the Netherlands

- Mechelen, Netherlands, a village in the municipality of Gulpen-Wittem, in the province of Limburg

== See also ==
- Machelen
- Machelen, Zulte
- Michelin
- Mechlin (disambiguation)
