= Burdinale =

Location
- Country: Belgium

Physical characteristics
- Source
  - location: Liège Province
- Mouth
  - location: Mehaigne
  - coordinates: 50.5707°N 5.1641°E

Burdinale is a river of Belgium, tributary of the Mehaigne.

== Course ==
The Burdinale originates in Le Moinil, a hamlet in Waret-l'Évêque on the border with Burdinne. It runs 8 kilometers through the province of Liège. It flows into the Mehaigne near the village of Huccorgne in Wanze municipality.

== Watershed ==
The Burdinale forms a very steep valley, draining a hydrographic basin of 28 square kilometers. The Burdinale valley is a Natura 2000 site and is part of the Burdinale-Mehaigne national park.
