= Moha, Belgium =

Moha
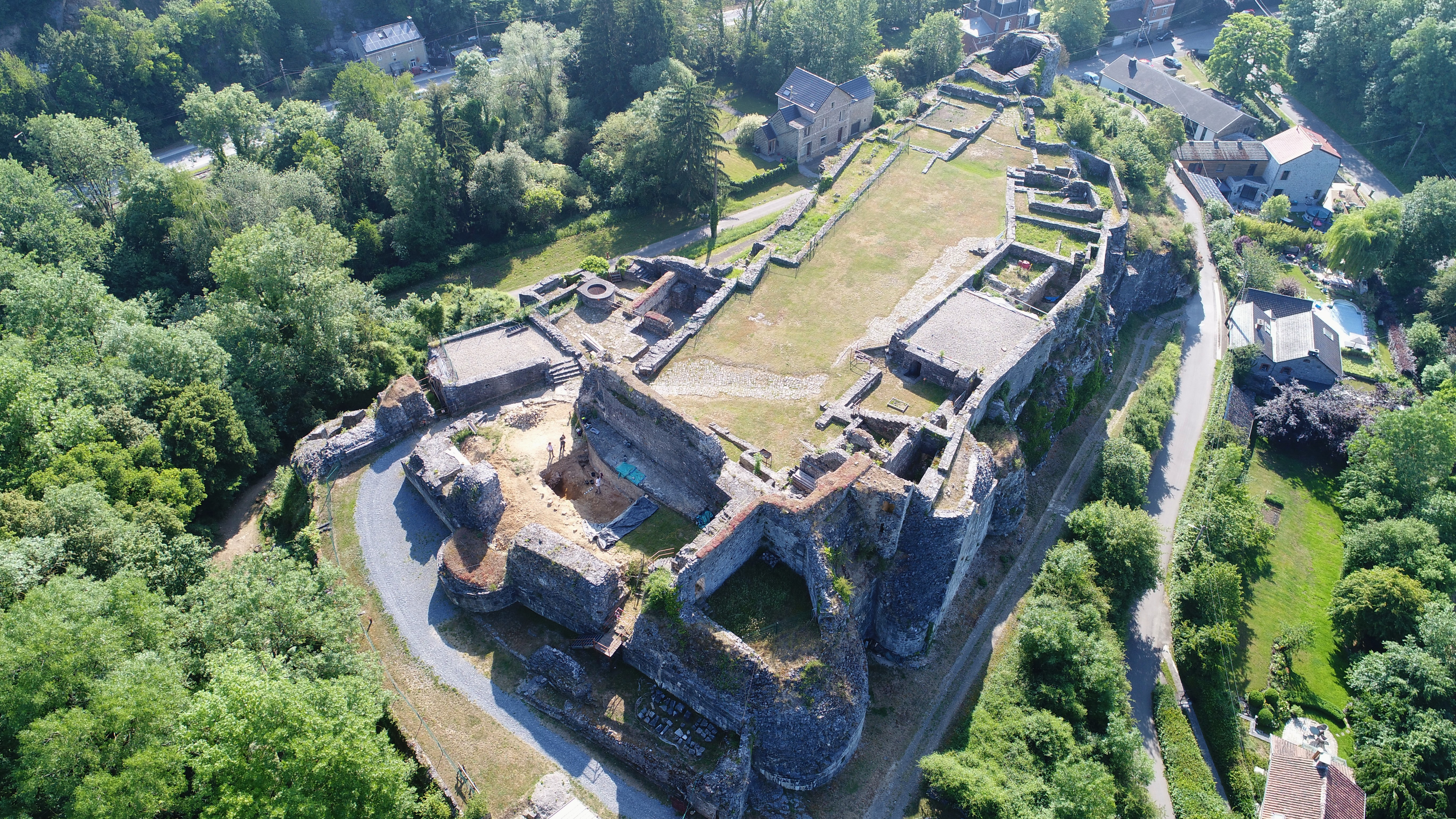
- Moha with the ruins of Château de Moha

- Coat of arms

- Location within Belgium Location within Europe
- Coordinates: 50°33′02″N 05°11′08″E
- Country: Belgium
- Region: Wallonia
- Province: Liège
- Municipality: Wanze

Moha (French pronunciation: [mɔa]; Walloon: Mouhå) is a village and district of the municipality of Wanze, located in the province of Liège in Wallonia, Belgium.

== History ==
From the end of the 9th century until the early 10th, Moha was the seat of the County of Moha, and the today ruined Château de Moha was the seat of the counts. Small-scale extraction of lead and silver took place here during the Middle Ages; in the 19th century large-scale stone quarries were established.

In the hamlet Saint-Sauveur a râperie was established. This small factory extracted raw juice from sugar beet. The juice was then pumped through a pipeline to the Wanze Sugar Factory.

== Sights ==
Apart from the castle, there are several other historical buildings in the village, including a fortified farm from the 16th century. The current village church was built in 1912 and replaced an older structure.
