= Mechelen-Bovelingen =

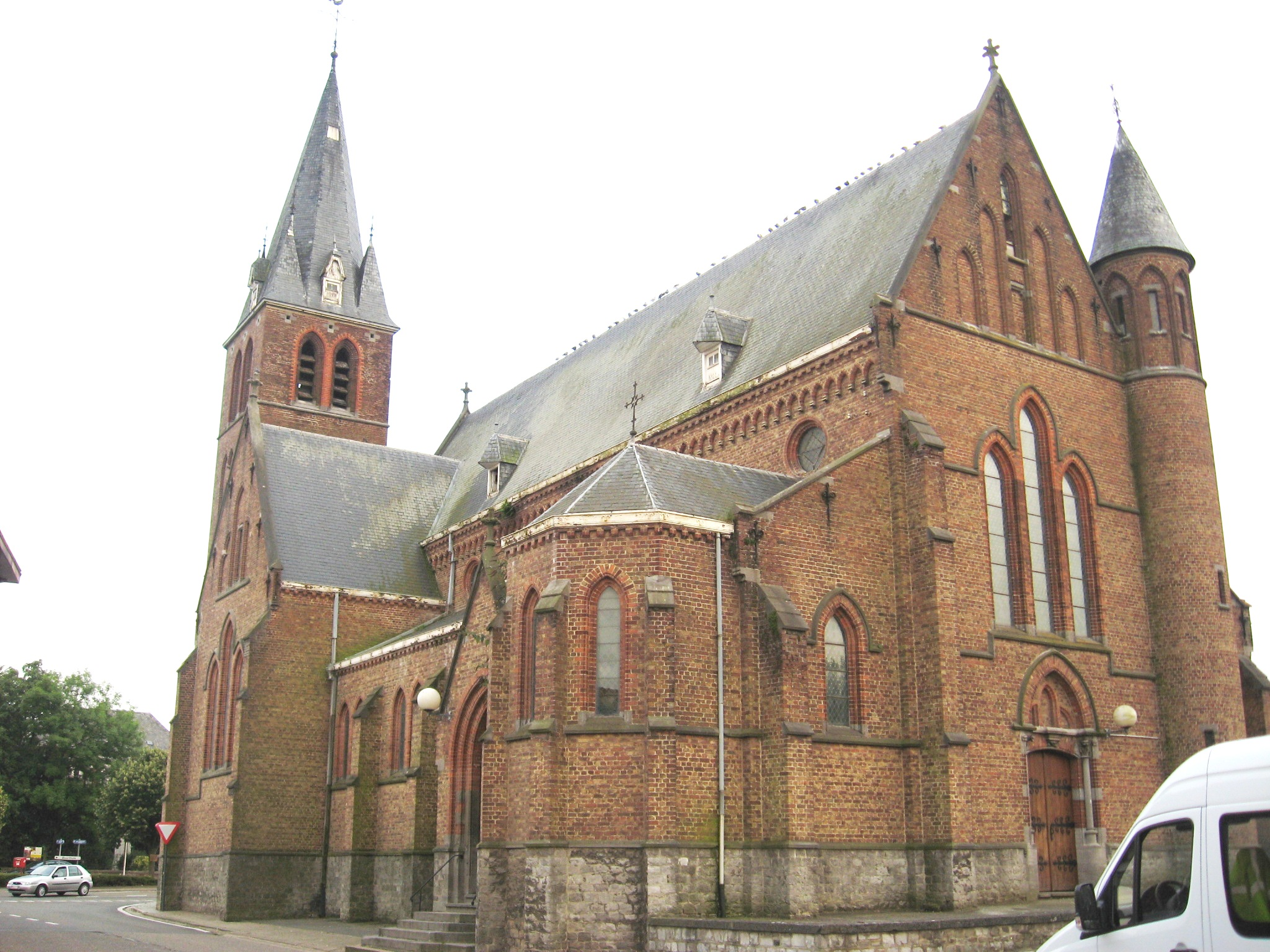
- St Anna's in Mechelen-Bovelingen

- Location within Belgium Location within Europe
- Coordinates: 50°44′28″N 05°15′39″E
- Country: Belgium
- Region: Flanders
- Province: Limburg
- Municipality: Wanze

Area
  - Total: 4.51 km^{2} (1.74 sq mi)

Population (01/01/2020)
  - Total: 1,536
  - Density: 340/km^{2} (880/sq mi)

Mechelen-Bovelingen (French: Marlinne) is a village in the Belgian province Limburg and a deelgemeente (sub-municipality) of the municipality of Heers.

== Characteristics ==
=== Settlements ===
The former municipality Mechelen-Bovelingen consisted of the hamlets Mechelen, Bovelingen, and the now disappeared Pepingen. Because of increasing linear settlement, the hamlets of Mechelen and Bovelingen are no longer recognizable as separate entities.

=== Former municipality ===
Until 1971 Mechelen-Bovelingen was a separate municipality with 1,300 inhabitants. From 1971 to 1977 it was a deelgemeente (sub-municipality) of Bovelingen together with Rukkelingen-Loon. In 1977 the short lived Bovelingen municipality became part of Heers municipality, to which the sub-municipality and village Mechelen-Bovelingen now belongs.

=== Nature and landscape ===
Mechelen-Bovelingen is on the plateau of Hesbaye, which locally has a height of 70 to 120 m. The village is in the valley of the small Herk (river), which flows through it towards the north. The brook Grondelingenbeek exits into the Herk just north of the village, as do some other brooks.

== History ==
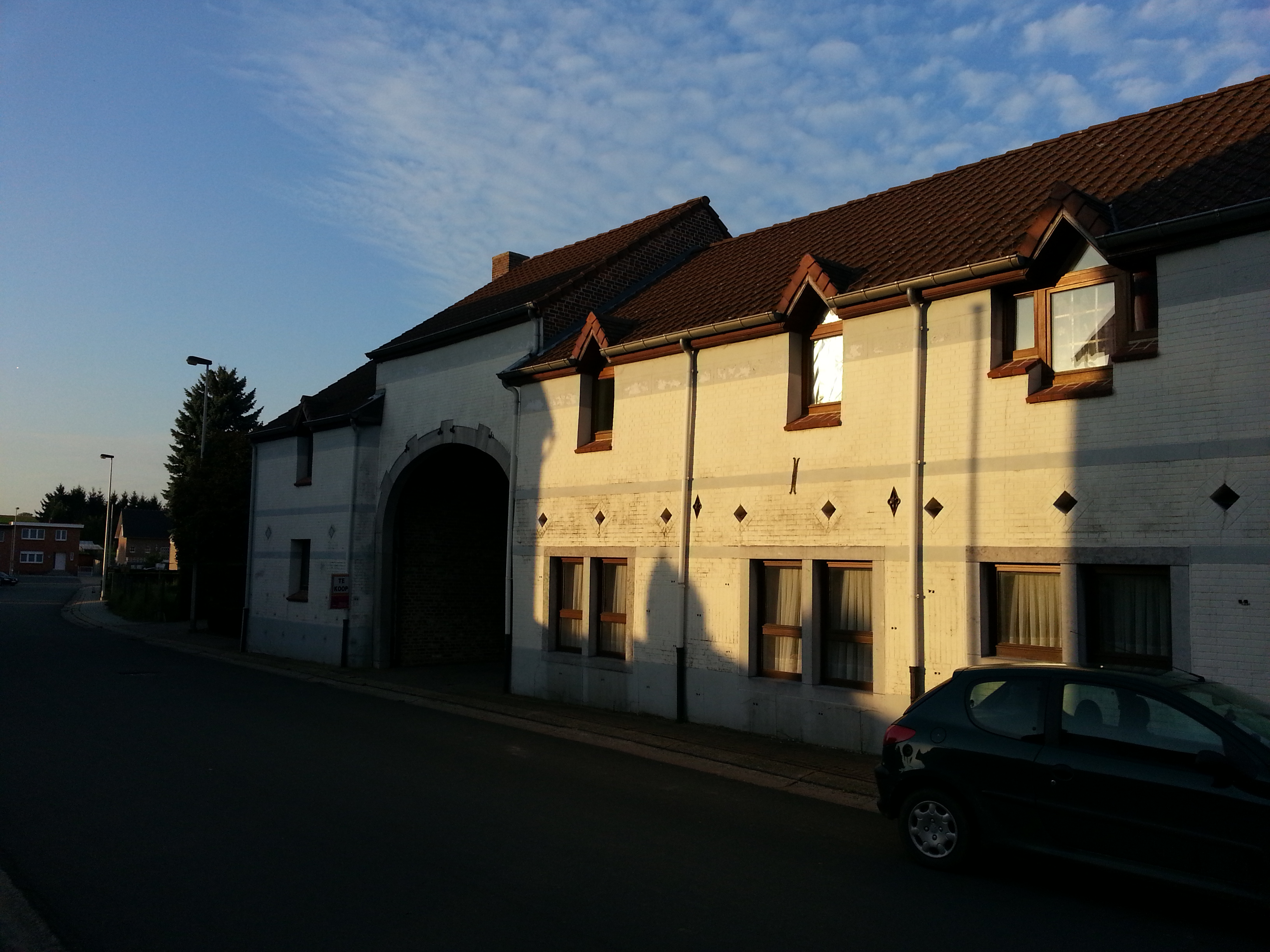
The Darishoeve in Mechelen-Bovelingen

In the Roman era there was at least one villa in the area. Remnants found were its foundations, pottery fragments and coins, the most recent from Marcus Aurelius (161-180). More foundations, fragments and coins were found elsewhere in the area. The Roman road from Tongeren over Heers to Gembloers crossed the surface of the former municipality.

Mechelen-Bovelingen was first mentioned in the 12th century as 'Mechlen' and in a romanised form as 'Ma(r)lines'. From the 14th century it was often mentioned as 'Quaedmechelen'. 'Quadt' means common, or small, and was used to distinguish it from the town of Mechelen.

Mechelen-Bovelingen was part of the personal domain of the Counts of Loon. It was divided into three lordships: Pepingen, Bovelingen and Mechelen and given to his vassals.

Pepingen consisted of the southern part of the current Gelindenstraat and a part of the Kloosterstraat. Fastrad was the first known Lord of Pepingen. He died before 1332. In the 14th and 15th century Pepingen was held by the De Werfengeis family, followed by the Schroots family. Pepingen then came to Michel de Borchgrave by marriage.

The Lordship Bovelingen was in the southern part of the former municipality. It was also known as Schalkhoven. Its first known lord was Jan van Schalkhoven, mentioned in 1390. Bovelingen was later held by the Van den Hoven family. In 1526 it was acquired by Aert Schroots Lord of Pepingen.

In 1616 Michel de Borchgrave, who already held Pepingen, also bought Bovelingen. He probably lived at Bovelingen Castle and left Pepingen Castle. In 1619 Michel de Borchgrave also acquired Mechelen and Rukkelingen-Loon. The local branch of the family de Borchgrave d'Altena held on to these four lordships till the end of the Ancien Régime. In 1745 Johannes-Baptista de Borchgrave got the title Graaf van Altena (Count of Altena) from Elector of Bavaria.

In 1795 the French authorities united the separate municipalities of Mechelen, Bovelingen and Pepingen into one municipality.

Mechelen was the real village in the area, with the Saint Anne's church. The parish of Rukkelingen split off in 1213. Pepingen had Saint Martin's chapel, renovated in 1623 and 1673. When the domain of the castle expanded, Pepingen lost most of its inhabitants, and the chapel demolished in 1880.

Mechelen-Bovelingen was a mainly agricultural village. In the village there was a now disappeared watermill. Along the road to Boekhout there was a windmill in the first half of the 19th century. Both were owned by the lords of the village / owners of the castle.

From 1872 till 1956 a râperie (suikerbietenmaalderij) of the Wanze Sugar Factory was operational in the village. Here the raw juice was extracted from sugar beet and then sent to the sugar factory in Wanze by pipeline. It employed about 40 people during the campaign, which generally ended in November or December.

The village remained essentially rural with some large farms that still specialize in the culture of sugar beet. It lacked industrial activity, and so it developed into a commuter village.

== Demographics ==
Historical population

Year	Pop.	±%
1831	657	—
1846	589	−10.4%
1856	580	−1.5%
1866	655	+12.9%
1880	745	+13.7%

Year	Pop.	±%
1890	831	+11.5%
1900	868	+4.5%
1910	871	+0.3%
1920	885	+1.6%
1930	1,056	+19.3%

Year	Pop.	±%
1947	1,125	+6.5%
1961	1,232	+9.5%
1970	?	—
1976	?	—

Source: NIS, Note:1831 till 1961=volkstellingen

== Sights ==
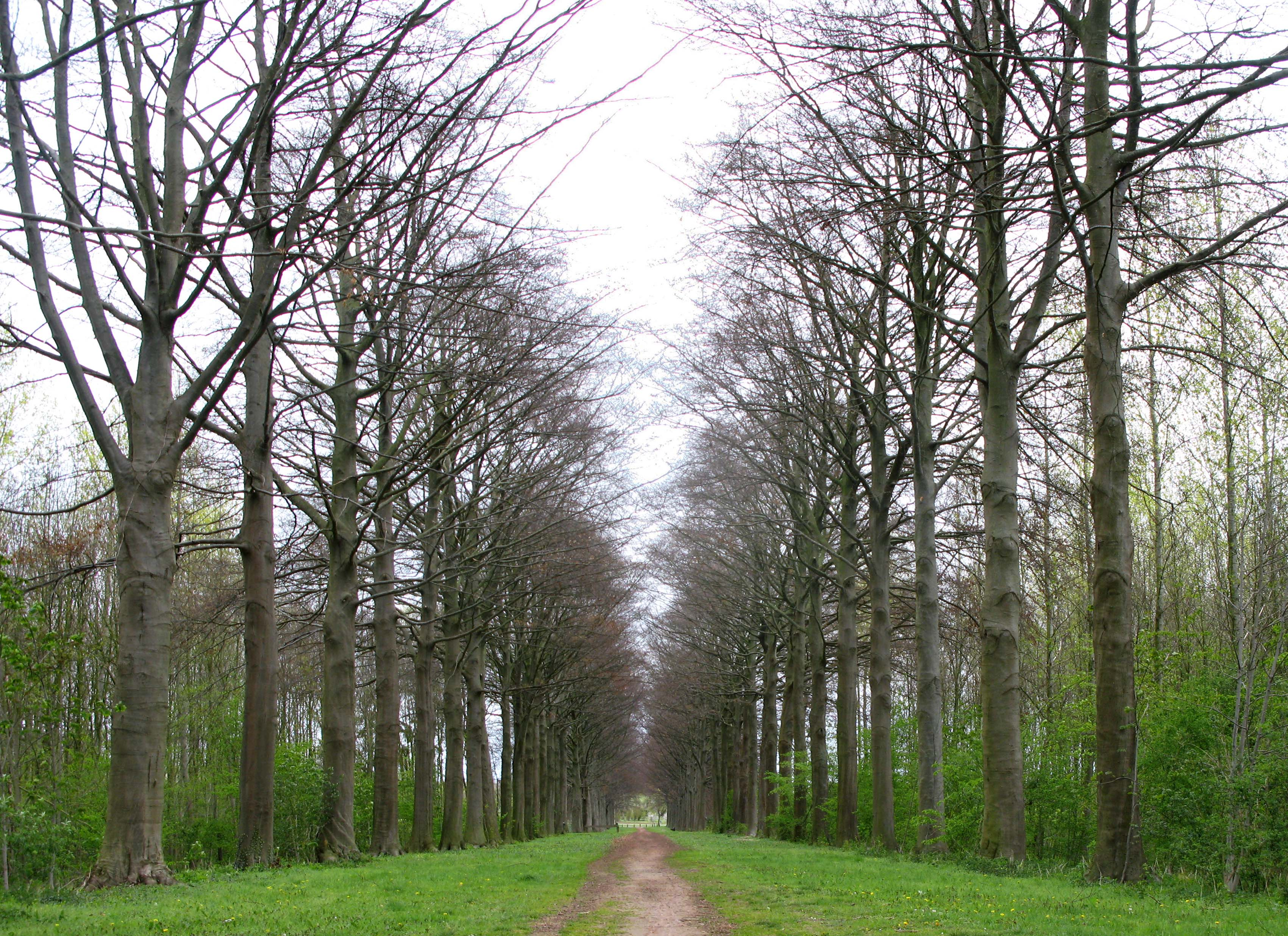
castle driveway

- The Neo Gothic Saint Anne's church dates from c. 1910. It was built to a design by H. Martens from Stevoort and V. Lenertz from Leuven. It has some paintings and statues from the old church. The organ is also from the old church and has historic significance.
- The old cemetery on the Schoolstraat has a tombstone from 1539. The cemetery marks the location of the original Saint Anne's church. It stood on the cemetery with its entrance facing the parsonage. The church was demolished in 1913.
- Most of Bovelingen Castle on Altenastraat was destroyed by fire in 1947. What remains are the utility buildings from the late 19th and early 20th century, and the castle farm from the early 18th century. These buildings can be seen from the road, but cannot be visited. The castle driveway from Kloosterstraat to the castle is now a public walkway.
- Saint-Martin's chapel on Kloosterstraat dates from 1872.
- The crypt of the de Borchgrave d'Altena family is just behind Saint-Martin's chapel.
- Small convent and school building on Kloosterstraat of the Soeurs de Marie from 1873.
- Râperie from 1872 on Bovelingenstraat (northern part). This operated till 1956. It later became smithy. The buildings are now in a bad shape.
- Our Lady of Lourdes chapel on Burgemeesterstraat from 1878.
- Monument for the fallen on the crossing of Bovelingenstraat and Kloosterstraat.

== Nearby ==
- Rukkelingen-Loon
- Batsheers
- Gelinden
- Boekhout

== Sources ==
- Schlusmans, Frieda (1999). "Mechelen-Bovelingen". Vlaanderen is erfgoed.
- Schlusmans, Frieda (1999b). "Parochiekerk Sint-Anna". Vlaanderen is erfgoed.
- Schlusmans, Frieda (1999c). "Kasteel van Bovelingen en bijgebouwen". Vlaanderen is erfgoed.
- "Sint-Martinuskapel". Vlaanderen is erfgoed. 2023.
- Schoefs, Jos (2023). "De bieten raperie". Heers en zijn 12 kerkdorpen.
- Schoefs, Jos (2023b). "De Oude Kerk". Heers en zijn 12 kerkdorpen.
