= List of protected heritage sites in Perwez =

This table shows an overview of the protected heritage sites in the Walloon town Perwijs, or Perwez. This list is part of Belgium's national heritage.

Object	Year/architect	Town/section	Address	Coordinates	Number^{?}	Image
Tower of the church of Saint-Jean-Baptiste ^{(nl)} ^{(fr)}		Perwijs	Wastinnes	50.669956°N 4.802733°E	25084-CLT-0001-01 Info	
Organs of the church of Saint-Martin-les-Beguines Thorembais, including the balustrade and an ensemble with the buffet of the instrument ^{(nl)} ^{(fr)}		Perwijs		50.658687°N 4.818344°E	25084-CLT-0002-01 Info	
Chapel of Saint-Roch and the ensemble of the chapel and its surroundings ^{(nl)} ^{(fr)}		Perwijs	rue Saint-Roch, Perwez	50.619253°N 4.818000°E	25084-CLT-0003-01 Info	Kapel Saint-Roch en het ensemble van de kapel en diens omgeving
Church of Saint-Trond and the churchyard wall, and the ensemble of the Church and surroundings ^{(nl)} ^{(fr)}		Perwijs	Perwez	50.635553°N 4.785035°E	25084-CLT-0004-01 Info	
Ensemble of the buildings and the cobbled courtyard of the farm of Mont in Perwez, and the ensemble of the farm, the lane, the entrance and surrounding area ^{(nl)} ^{(fr)}		Perwijs		50.660220°N 4.814509°E	25084-CLT-0005-01 Info	Ensemble van de gebouwen en de geplaveide binnenplaats van de boerderij van Mont te Perwez, alsook het ensemble van de boerderij, de dreef, de toegangsweg en de omliggende terreinen
The facades and roofs of small Cense ^{(nl)} ^{(fr)}		Perwijs	Perwez	50.656086°N 4.819397°E	25084-CLT-0006-01 Info	
The facades and roofs of the portico, the main building and the street wing, and the totality of the driveway of the farm ^{(nl)} ^{(fr)}		Perwijs	rue Trémouroux n°94, Perwez	50.637454°N 4.762453°E	25084-CLT-0007-01 Info	De gevels en daken van de portiek, het hoofdgebouw en de straatvleugel, en de totaliteit van de doorgang van de boerderij
Farm of Mellemont, the totality of the two barns, the porch in the southeast, wells and stables (A), the four western bays (B) and the surrounding wall, the stones today the second courtyard, the façades and roofs of other buildings except the four modern buildings, and the ensemble of the farm, the stream Thorembais, the rows of poplars and the agricultural plain. ^{(nl)}		Perwijs		50.652343°N 4.806591°E	25084-CLT-0008-01 Info	Boerderij van Mellemont, de totaliteit van de twee schuren, het portiek in het zuidoosten, waterputten en stallen (A), de vier westelijke traveeën (B) en de omliggende muur, de stenen vand e binnenplaats, de gevels en daken van de andere gebouwen uitgezonderd de vier moderne bijgebouwen, en het ensemble van de boerderij, de stroom Thorembais, de rijen populieren en de agrarische vlakte.

== See also ==
- Lists of protected heritage sites in Walloon Brabant
- Perwez
