= De Knoppel =

Nature reserve in Belgium

Coordinates: 50°46′22″N 5°17′16″E

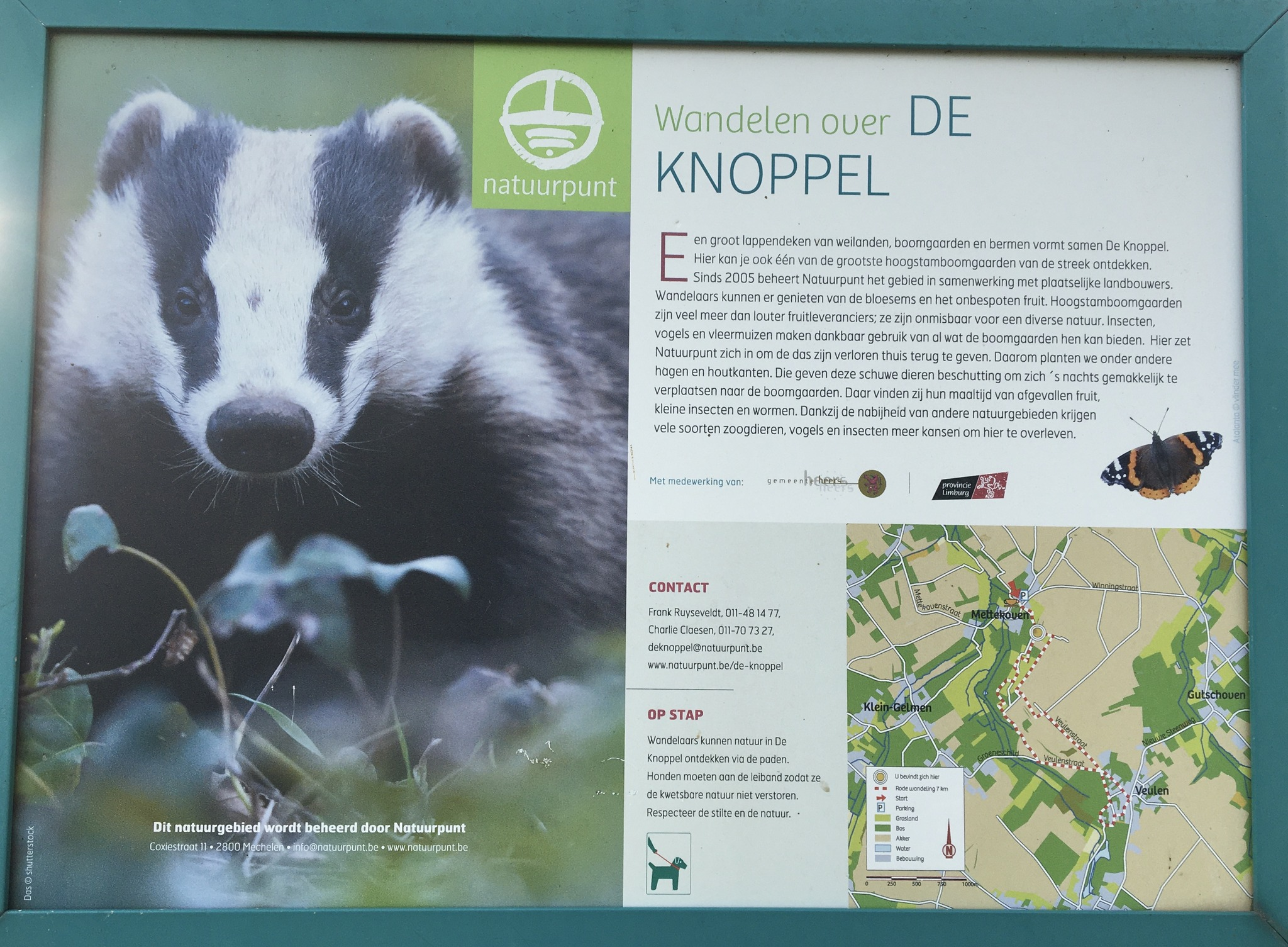
De Knoppel infoboard

De Knoppel is a nature reserve near the village of Mettekoven, Heers municipality, Belgium near the rivulet Herk.

De Knoppel has an area of 13 hectares. It is owned by the province of Limburg and created as a result of land consolidation of the village. It is a combinalion of meadows, high-stem orchards and tree lawns. This gave a possibility for the return of badgers. Since 2005 it is managed by the Natuurpunt association.
