= List of protected heritage sites in Wanze =

This table shows an overview of the protected heritage sites in the Walloon town Wanze. This list is part of Belgium's national heritage.

Object	Year/architect	Town/section	Address	Coordinates	Number^{?}	Image
Abbey Val Notre-Dame: hotels, lodging abbey, dovecote, abbey farm ^{(nl)} ^{(fr)}		Wanze	rue du Val Notre-Dame, n° 396	50.550046°N 5.215654°E	61072-CLT-0001-01 Info	Abdij Val Notre-Dame: hotels, onderdak abdij, duiventil, abdijhoeve
Chateau Coulon, facade and roof ^{(nl)} ^{(fr)}		Wanze	rue Romainville, n° 22	50.517431°N 5.179917°E	61072-CLT-0002-01 Info	
Rocks: Corneilles Roches aux Roches and de la Marquise ^{(nl)} ^{(fr)}		Wanze		50.560801°N 5.176179°E	61072-CLT-0004-01 Info	
Ruins of the Castle of Moha ^{(nl)} ^{(fr)}		Wanze	rue de Madot et alentours	50.553149°N 5.179941°E	61072-CLT-0006-01 Info	Ruïnes van het Kasteel van Moha
chapel ^{(nl)} ^{(fr)}		Wanze	rue Albert Ier, contre le n°12	50.563971°N 5.231270°E	61072-CLT-0007-01 Info	Kapelletje
Quarry, Fond du Roua ^{(nl)} ^{(fr)}		Wanze		50.573012°N 5.211028°E	61072-CLT-0008-01 Info	Groeve, Fond du Rouâ
Châtau rouge (facades, roofs, chimneys, wallpaper of the dining room), buildings (facades and roofs), pavilion (facades, roofs, ceiling paintings) and a wall, Romainville Rue n ° 11 ^{(nl)} ^{(fr)}		Wanze		50.519480°N 5.187890°E	61072-CLT-0009-01 Info	
chapel ^{(nl)} ^{(fr)}		Wanze	rue Georges Smal, face au n° 2	50.536897°N 5.214388°E	61072-CLT-0010-01 Info	Kapelletje
Some parts of the house and outbuildings ^{(nl)} ^{(fr)}		Wanze	rue de l'Eglise n° 225	50.547228°N 5.185400°E	61072-CLT-0011-01 Info	Sommige delen van het huis en de bijgebouwen
Chapel of Notre-Dame de Bon Voyage ^{(nl)} ^{(fr)}		Wanze	rue de Villers, face au n°2, anciennement chapelle de Vinalmont	50.566833°N 5.232812°E	61072-CLT-0013-01 Info	Kapelletje van Notre-Dame de Bon Voyage

== See also ==
- List of protected heritage sites in Liège (province)
- Wanze
