= Sucrerie centrale de Cambrai =

Sugar factory in France

Coordinates: 50°11′30″N 3°15′20″E

Sucrerie centrale de Cambrai Sucrerie centrale d'Escaudœuvres Sucrerie Tereos d'Escaudœuvres
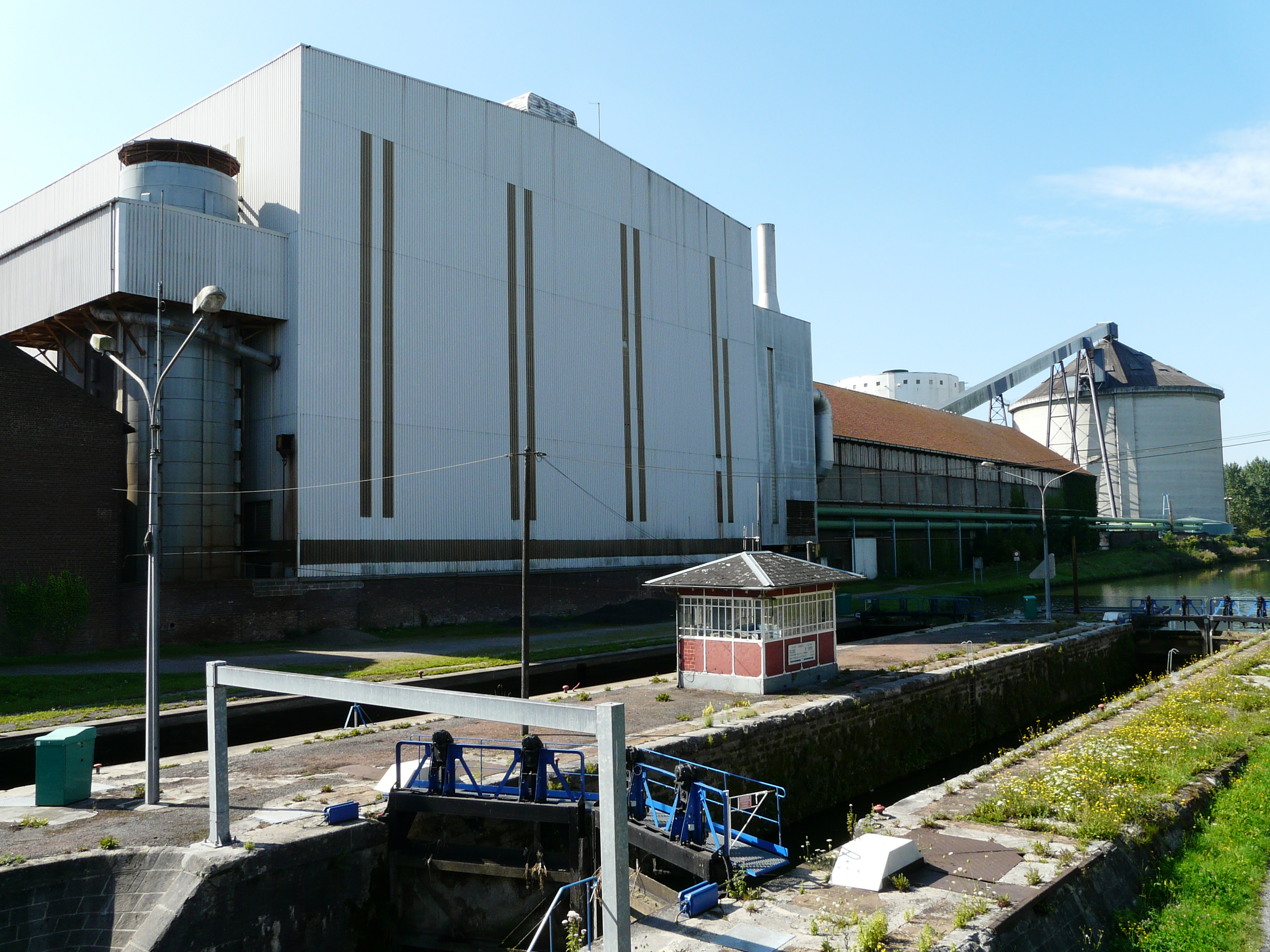
- The factory and the lock on the Scheldt

- Location within France
- Built: 1872
- Location: Escaudœuvres
- Employees: 40 (as of 2023)
- Owner: Tereos
- Defunct: June 2023 (sugar production)

The Sucrerie centrale de Cambrai was a company which had a central beet sugar factory in Escaudœuvres, Nord department, France. This Sucrerie centrale d'Escaudœuvres was fed by about a dozen râperies. In 2003 the company was merged into its owner Tereos. The central factory then continued to operate as Sucrerie Tereos d'Escaudœuvres until 2023. The facilities are now only used for storage and logistics.

== Characteristics ==
The official name of the company that founded the factory was 'Sucrerie centrale de Cambrai'. It was located in Escaudœuvres. The name reflected that for some time, the facility was a central factory which finished the work of satellite factories, so called râperies. These closed down in the 1960s, but the company and factory did not change their names.

The factory's location in Escaudœuvres, just north of Cambrai is due to geography. The surrounding area is farm land with much clay and lime, ideal for growing sugar beet. Also, the Nord-Pas de Calais Mining Basin is close by, which was important to get cheap coal. There was also a good rail and canal network in the area. The latter consisted of its location on the river Scheldt with its many side canals.

The factory is now part of the cooperative industrial group Tereos, which bought its owner in 2002 and then liquidated the Sucrerie centrale de Cambrai company by merging it into Béghin-Say.

== History ==
=== Foundation and early years ===
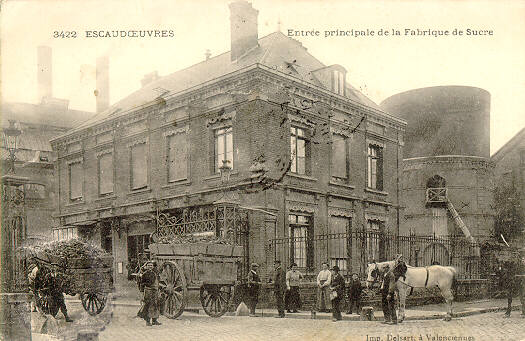
Entrance to the factory

The idea to establish the Sucrerie Centrale de Cambrai came up at the time that the râperie - central factory concept was popular. A râperie is a small sugar factory that extracts the raw juice from sugar beet. The juice is then transported to a central factory by means of a cast iron pipeline. At the time, this greatly reduced road transport cost, which were very high for heavy cargo.

The engineer Jules Linard invented the transport of raw juice by pipeline. He applied it for the first time in 1867. Encouraged by international free trade politics and a growing demand for sugar, he got the idea to found his own sugar factory. With the advice of the lawyer Léon Estivan, Linard opted to establish a public company so he could raise enough money to implement the concept on a very large scale.

The factory was built by Société J. F. Cail & Cie in 1872.

=== Initial Set up ===
At the end of 1873, there were 17 râperies with 87.5 miles of tubing. In order to increase production of the central factory to the designed capacity of 250,000 t of beet, there were plans for 8 more râperies. A boiler-iron reservoir for raw juice of 5,000 hectoliters stood 400 m from the factory. The lime quarry was next to the reservoir and was connected to the factory by a horse railroad.

The main hall of the central factory was of brick, with an iron roof. It measured 100 by 18 m and was 30 m high. On one of its sides, four small buildings extended. The first had the repair shop and milk of lime vats below, and the filter presses above. The second building had the steam boilers. The third building held the bone black revivifying furnaces. The fourth building had below: 45 tanks of 1,000 hectoliters each for the second and third products, and above: the packing and storage room for sugar of 1,800 m^{2}.

The factory's nearby gas works furnished 500 m^{3} per day. Also nearby was the furnace for carbon dioxide gas. This held 500 m^{3} of gas and was fed by an elevator.

The steam boilers were 16, each having a heated surface of 200 m^{2}, giving a total of 2,400 hp. The revivifying furnaces were two from Schreiber, each supplying 150 hectoliters per day.

The main hall had the engines and turbines on the ground floor. Running along one side, on platforms, were: the tanks for the first and second carbonatation; the multiple effect evaporators; and the vacuum pans.

For 1873 or 1874 it was reported that the second and third product (sugar of lower quality) had not been made. The report said that 60 t of sugar had been manufactured daily. The central factory employed about 400 people, the râperies another 1,100.

In 1877 the râperies were in:

- Rieux-en-Cambrésis
- Avesnes-les-Aubert
- Carnières
- Crèvecœur-sur-l'Escaut
- Honnecourt-sur-Escaut
- Villers-Guislain
- Villers-Plouich
- Bertincourt
- Flesquières
- Mœuvres
- Fontaine-Notre-Dame, Nord
- Bourlon
- Bantigny
- Épinoy
- Bullecourt
- Beugnies
- Demicourt
- Lagnicourt-Marcel

=== Situation in 1896 ===
In 1896 the Sucrerie centrale de Cambrai was the biggest sugar factory in France, and one of the biggest in the world. It could process 3,000 t of beet per day. For this, the raw juice of the sugar beet was extracted in 16 râperies, one of which was located at the factory itself. These râperies spread out up to 15 km from the factory and were connected by 130 km of pipeline of different diameters. The scale of the factory was easily 10 times that of regular sugar factories.

In 1896 the location of the facilities was very favorable. The facilities were in an area which was very well suited to grow sugar beet. This allowed the creation of the network of râperies and guaranteed the steady supply of beet at a competing price. The factory was close to the northern coal mines. Its huge demand for limestone was supplied by a nearby quarry. For transport it had a canal with quays and its own railway connection to Cambrai station. Water for the machinery and central râperie was provided by the canal and several pits.

The central factory communicated to the râperies by telegraph and telephone. This was crucial, because the râperies had to stop their supply if the central factory could not process it. Otherwise, the pumpedup juice would be lost or even inundate the central factory. At the central factory there was a tank of 6,000 hectoliter to temporarily store the juice.

The râperie at the central factory also served for beet delivered by boat or rail. The beet that were delivered by boat were unloaded by steam cranes on rails. These beet could either be unloaded to the reception area, or to rail carriages which brought them to storage. The râperie at the central factory could process 300 t per day. The reception area with its long gutters assured a good cleaning. After cleaning, the beet were transported to the top of the building by means of a screw.

The central factory itself consisted of a great machinery hall of 100 by 18 m. It was surrounded by smaller buildings like the scum works, the generators, repair shops etc. In the great (machinery) hall the ground floor held: the vacuum pumps for the evaporators and vacuum pans, those for the ventilation system, the scum pumps and other pumps. One floor up were the boilers for the first and second carbonatation. Below these were the clearing tanks and filters. The triple effect evaporators and multiple vacuum pans were also at this level. The scum works were in a separate building. This also applied to the steam engines, which were in two parallel buildings separated by two railway tracks used to supply coal.

In 1896, the factory at Escaudœuvres was remarkable for its huge production and its perfectionism. Together with its râperies, it employed 2,000 workers, and could process 3,000 t of beet per day, which could lead to producing 3,000 bags of sugar per day. For this it used 30 wagons of coal, 15 of lime, and 3 of cokes. In 1894-1895 241,665 t of beet had been processed, and 246,822 bags of sugar of 100 kg each had been produced. This had required 31,000 t of coal.

=== Gruesome accident (1897) ===
On 14 October 1897 a gruesome accident happened in the central hall. The lower tank of one of the quintuple effect evaporators was not functioning well. The director of the factory, the chief engineer, two sous-chefs and 11 laborers were investigating and working on the malfunction in a place below the evaporator when the boiler exploded. The evaporator normally contained 30,000 liters of juice. This boiling juice now spread over the people below it. The lid of the boiler which had blown up meanwhile ripped open some steam pipes, the steam knocking out some people which were still standing after the initial shock.

Chief engineer Cottereau had been burned so badly that he was unrecognizable and died soon after. Sous-chef Croisier was found dead below a broken pipe. Sous-chef Dizy was severely burned and died of his wounds. 5 laborers were expected to die of their wounds, while 7 more were seriously wounded. In the end four laborers would die. Director Camuset had been working below the boiler with the others, but had been called to his office just before the explosion.

=== Twentieth century ===
During World War I, the area saw a lot of fighting. E.g. in the Battle of Cambrai (1917). Some of the râperies of the company were destroyed. The factory itself was heavily damaged. The war also led to a strong modernization and concentration of the sugar industry in northern France, with many small factories not reopening.

In 1923 the factory made its first post war campaign after a rebuilt and modernization. In about 1930 the factory in Escaudœuvres had a capacity of 3,000 t of beet per day. It used 9 râperies at a maximum distance of 24 km. The juice travelled at a speed of 1 km/h. In 1939 the capacity was also 3,000 t of beet per day.

In 1960 Sucrerie centrale de Cambrai merged with Les Sucreries Millet. In 1965 it acquired the Sucrerie de Bohain. The râperies were closed, and capacity at Escaudœuvres was increased to 5,000 t per day.

In 1971 a sugar silo of 35,000 t was taken into use.

=== Controlled by Béghin-Say (1972) ===
In April 1972 Béghin-Say made a tender offer to the shareholders of Sucrerie centrale de Cambrai. In 1990 Béghin-Say owned 68.12% of Sucrerie centrale de Cambrai.

In 1974 capacity was increased to 8,000 t of beet per day. In 1987, a sugar silo of 80,000 t was taken into use.

=== Controlled by Tereos (2002-2023) ===
In 2002 the cooperative industrial group Tereos bought Béghin-Say. In 2003 a Squeeze-out of the minority shareholders in the Sucrerie centrale de Cambrai via an offre publique de retrait for EUR 215 per share by Béghin Say was approved.

In March 2023 Tereos announced that it would close down sugar production at Escaudœuvres. In June 2023 the reorganization plan was agreed with the labor unions. By the plan 40 of the 123 employees would continue to work at Escaudoeuvres, which would continue in use as a logistics hub.

== Sources ==
- Flourens, M.G. (1896), "La Sucrerie Centrale de Cambrai", La Sucrerie Inidgène et Coloniale, vol. XLVII, La Sucrerie Inidgène et Coloniale, pp. 534–539
- "Faits Divers". Le Courrier de l'Escaut. 16 October 1897.
- Whiteside, R.M. (1991), Major Companies of Europe 1990/91: Volume 1 Major Companies of the continental European Economic Community, vol. 1, Graham & Trotman, London, ISBN 9789400907973
- "Cottereau", Bulletin de l'Association des Chimistes de Sucrerie et de Distillerie, XV, l'Association des Chimistes de Sucrerie et de Distillerie, Paris: 450–455, 1898
- Liste générale des fabriques de sucre, vol. Campagne 1877–78, Bureaux du Journal des Fabricants de Sucre, 1878
- Ringelmann, M. (1895), "Concours international d'arracheurs de betteraves a Cambrai", Journal d'Agriculture pratique, vol. II, Librairie Agricole de la Maison Rustique, Paris, pp. 512–514
- "Technisch overzicht der Suikerindustrie". De Indische mercuur; orgaan gewijd aan den uitvoerhandel. 3 December 1930.
- "Beghin va lancer une O.P.A. sur la Sucrerie centrale de Cambrai". Le Monde. 27 April 1972.
- "La Sucrerie d'Escaudoeuvres". Association pour la Sauvegarde de la Sucrerie de Francieres. 2023.
- "History". Tereos. 2023.
- "Tereos: La fuite en avant (après la pollution)". Blast. March 2023.
- "Sucrerie centrale de Cambrai : offre publique de retrait recevable". Boursier. 11 November 2003.
- Tollinchi, Anne-Lyvia (8 March 2023). "Tereos : le géant sucrier français veut supprimer plus de 120 emplois sur le site d'Escaudœuvres". Ici.
- "Nord: Une Quarantaine d'Emplois maintenus sur le Site Tereos d' Escaudoeuvres". BFM Lille. 14 June 2023.
- Shapleigh, Waldron (1874), "The Cambrai Cetnral Beet-Sugar Wors, (Nord) France", The American Chemist, Henry C. Lea, Philadelphia: 281–282
