= Mehaigne =

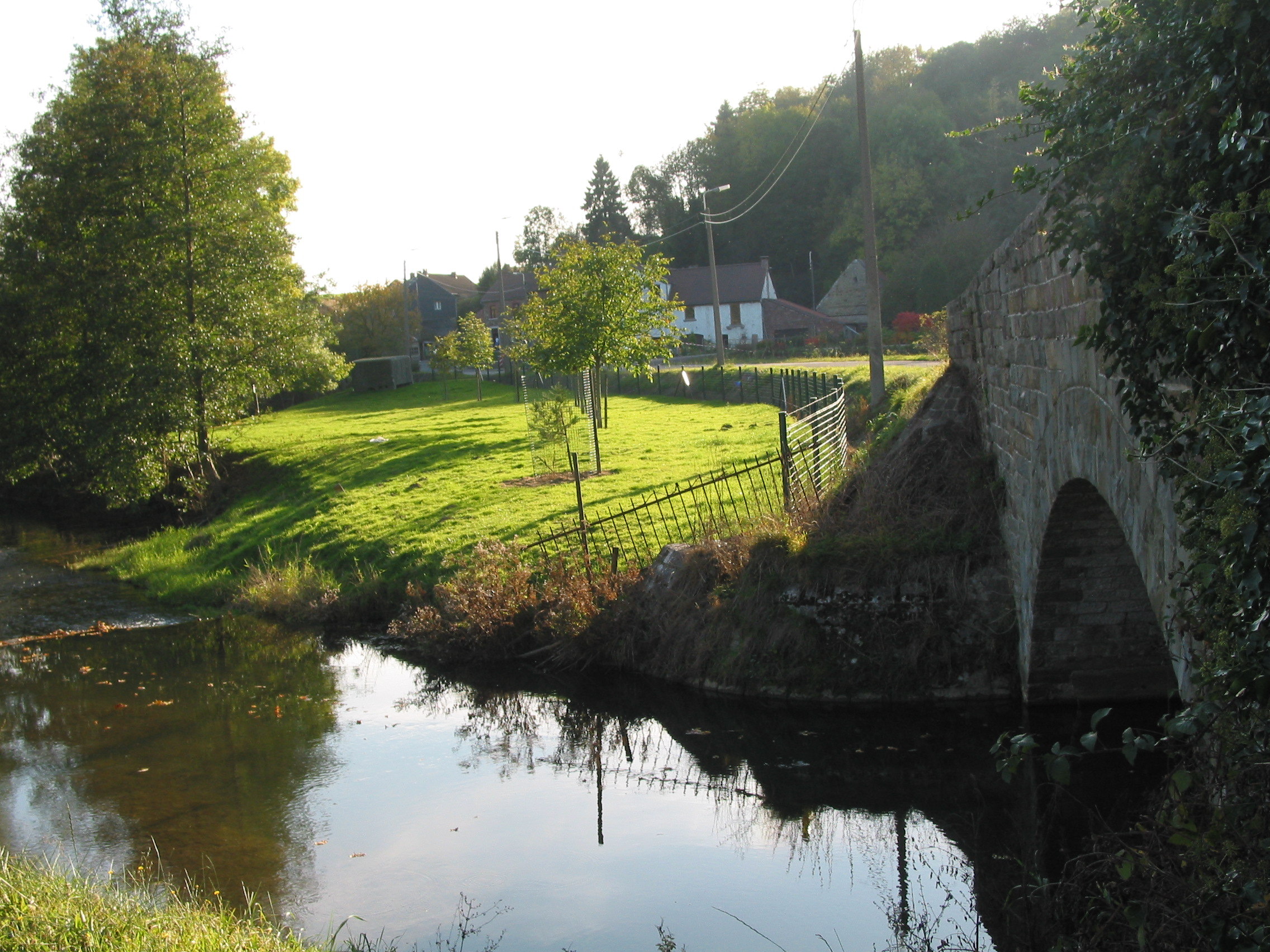

Location
- Country: Belgium

Physical characteristics
- Source
  - location: province of Namur
- Mouth
  - location: Meuse
  - coordinates: 50.5282°N 5.2150°E
  - elevation: 85 m (279 ft)

Basin features
- Progression: Meuse→ North Sea

The Mehaigne (French pronunciation: [mə.ɛɲ]) is a river in Belgium. It is a left tributary to the Meuse. Its source is at Saint-Denis (La Bruyère), in the province of Namur, at an elevation of 180 metres (590 ft).

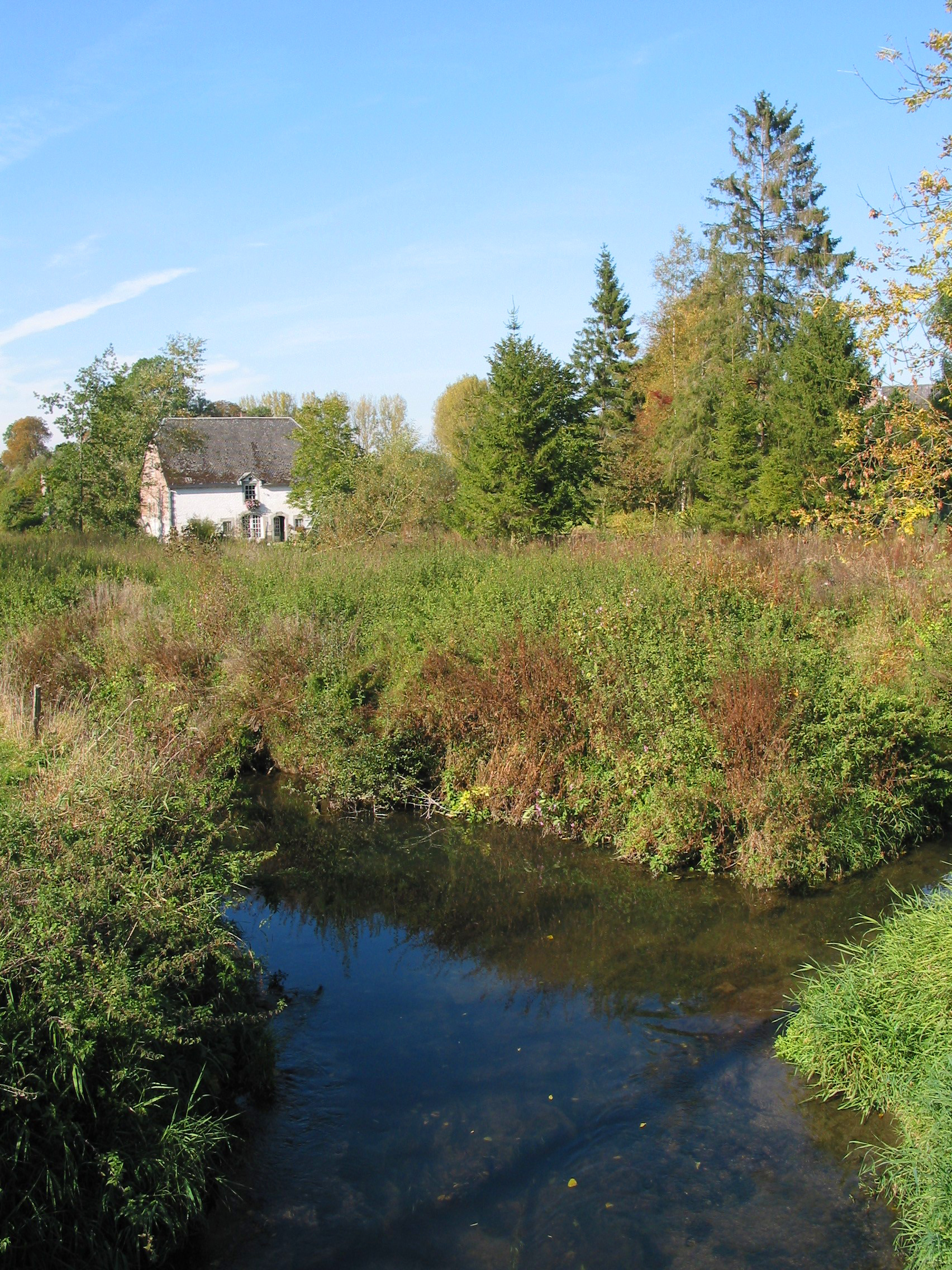
The Mehaigne in Braives

The Mehaigne river flows in a roughly eastern direction through a region called Hesbaye. It flows into the river Meuse in the municipality of Wanze at an elevation of 85 metres (279 ft).
