= Longchamps, Éghezée =

Longchamps
- Location within Belgium Location within Europe
- Coordinates: 50.578286°N 4.897896°E
- Country: Belgium
- Region: Wallonia
- Province: Namur
- Municipality: Éghezée

Area
  - Total: 4.13 km^{2} (1.59 sq mi)

Population (1 January 2020)
  - Total: 763
  - Density: 185/km^{2} (480/sq mi)

Longchamps (French pronunciation: [lɔ̃ʃɑ̃]) is a village in the Belgian Namur Province and a deelgemeente (sub-municipality) of the municipality of Éghezée.

== Characteristics ==
=== Geography ===
The village is about two kilometers south-southwest of the village Éghezée, center of the eponymous municipality. Longchamps is on the Hesbaye plateau. The area is crossed by two brooks, the Longchamps brook and the Basses Prêles brook.

=== Economy ===
The industrial zone of Eghezée is on the territory of the sub-municipality. The Le Clercq company produces Kewlox furniture. The Brichart company has a large depot for cereals and fertilizer.

The râperie de Longchamps is part of the Wanze Sugar Factory. During the season it processes 12,000 t of sugar beet per day. These are grown on a surface of about 20,000 hectares. The râperie extracts raw juice from the beet. The juice is then transported to the factory in Wanze by pipeline.

=== Demography ===
Historical population

Year	Pop.	±%
1831	430	—
1846	536	+24.7%
1856	533	−0.6%
1866	515	−3.4%
1880	551	+7.0%

Year	Pop.	±%
1890	497	−9.8%
1900	445	−10.5%
1910	438	−1.6%
1920	423	−3.4%
1930	426	+0.7%

Year	Pop.	±%
1947	406	−4.7%
1961	368	−9.4%
1970	402	+9.2%
1976	483	+20.1%

Source: NIS, Opm:1831 tot en met 1970=volkstellingen, 1976= inwoneraantal op 31 December

== History ==
The name Longchamps stems from longus campus. In the area: a Roman military camp, Roman side roads (diverticula) and tumuli were found.

In medieval times, Longchamps was an enclave of the Duchy of Brabant in the County of Namur. It was part of the barony of Bierbeek, which in turn depended on Aarschot. In 1652 it became a barony for Hubert de Corswarem.

Until 1977 Longchamps was a separate municipality. By the Fusion of the Belgian municipalities it became part of Éghezée municipality.

== Sights ==
- The Saint Feuillen church of 1838 was built as an upgrade of the castle chapel after Longchamps became an independent parish in 1837. The tower was built in 1863. The interior of the church has the crypt of the lords of Longchamps. Close to the altar is the epitaph of Hubert de Corswarem (+1671). Hubert de Corswarem became famous for claiming to be a direct descendant from the Counts of Loon. This false claim is reflected on this epitaph.
- Le Château de Longchamps was built on the foundations of a Roman villa. At the end of World War II it belonged to Léopold de Marotte de Montigny. It was sold in 1955. Only the lower part of the central building remains of the medieval castle. Two stones with the arms of Selis de Longchamps and Marotte de Montigny have been set in its walls.
- The farm Haibe has the year 1739 above its gate. It has been entirely restored and is now house.
- The settling basins of the râperie are known as a stop for many migratory birds. Access is limited.

== Sources ==
- Jespers, Jean-Jacques (2005), Dictionnaire des noms de lieux en Wallonie et à Bruxelles, Editions Racine, Bruxelles, ISBN 9782873864095
- "Longchamps". Eghezée Web Infos.
- Naveau, Léon (1895), "Analyse du Recueil d'Epitaphes des le Fort III", Bulletin Société des Bibliophiles liègeois, vol. 5–6, Société des Bibliophiles liègeois, pp. 177–308
