= Perwez =

Municipality in Walloon Brabant province, Wallonia, Belgium

- Municipality
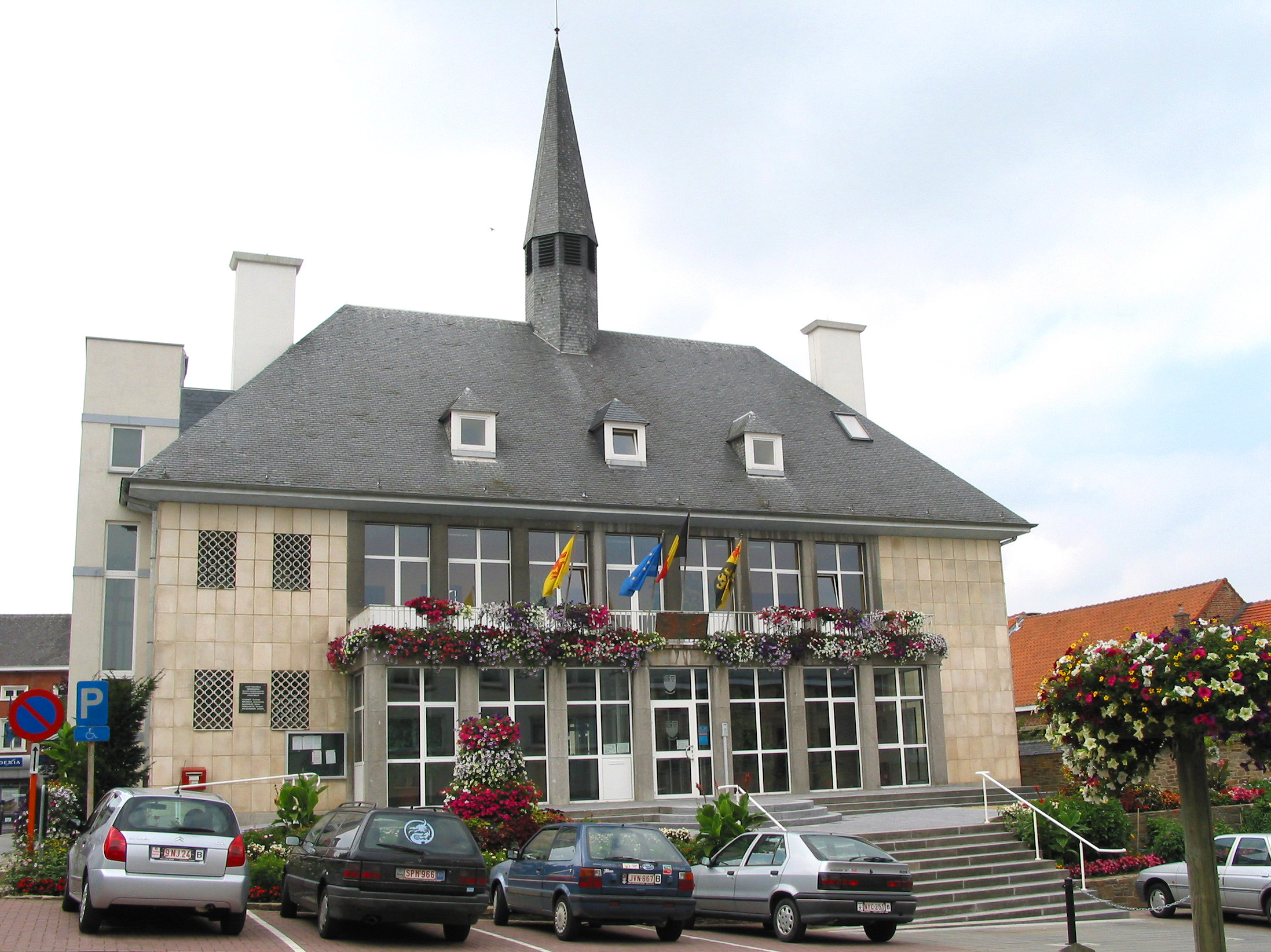
- Perwez: the Town Hall

- Flag Coat of arms

- The municipality of Perwez in Walloon Brabant
- Interactive map of Perwez
- Location in Belgium
- Coordinates: 50°37′N 04°49′E
- Country: Belgium
- Community: French Community
- Region: Wallonia
- Province: Walloon Brabant
- Arrondissement: Nivelles

Government
  - Mayor: Jordan Godfriaux
  - Governing party: MR-Ecolo-independent

Area
  - Total: 51.17 km^{2} (19.76 sq mi)

Population (2018-01-01)
  - Total: 9,291
  - Density: 181.6/km^{2} (470.3/sq mi)
- Postal codes: 1360
- NIS code: 25084
- Area codes: 081
- Website: www.perwez.be

Perwez (French pronunciation: [pɛʁwe]; Walloon: Perwé; Dutch: Perwijs, Dutch pronunciation: [pɛrˈʋɛis]) is a municipality of Wallonia located in the Belgian province of Walloon Brabant.

== Geography and demographics ==
On 1 January 2006 the municipality had 7,487 inhabitants. The total area is 50.81 km^{2}, giving a population density of 147 inhabitants per km^{2}.

The municipality consists of the following districts: Malèves-Sainte-Marie-Wastines, Orbais, Thorembais-les-Béguines, and Thorembais-Saint-Trond.

== History ==
In Roman times, Perwez was on the Roman road from Bavay to Cologne. This resulted in three tumuli which are no longer visible today. In 1977 a tomb with several Roman artefacts was discovered near the farm of Long Pont.

In medieval times, Perwez often suffered from its position near the border between the Duchy of Brabant and the Prince-Bishopric of Liège. Perwez developed around its church and its castle, which was demolished somewhat before 1870. The main source of wealth for Perwez was its market, which relied on agricultural products.

School Meal Program – 1918 – PERWEZ (Belgium)

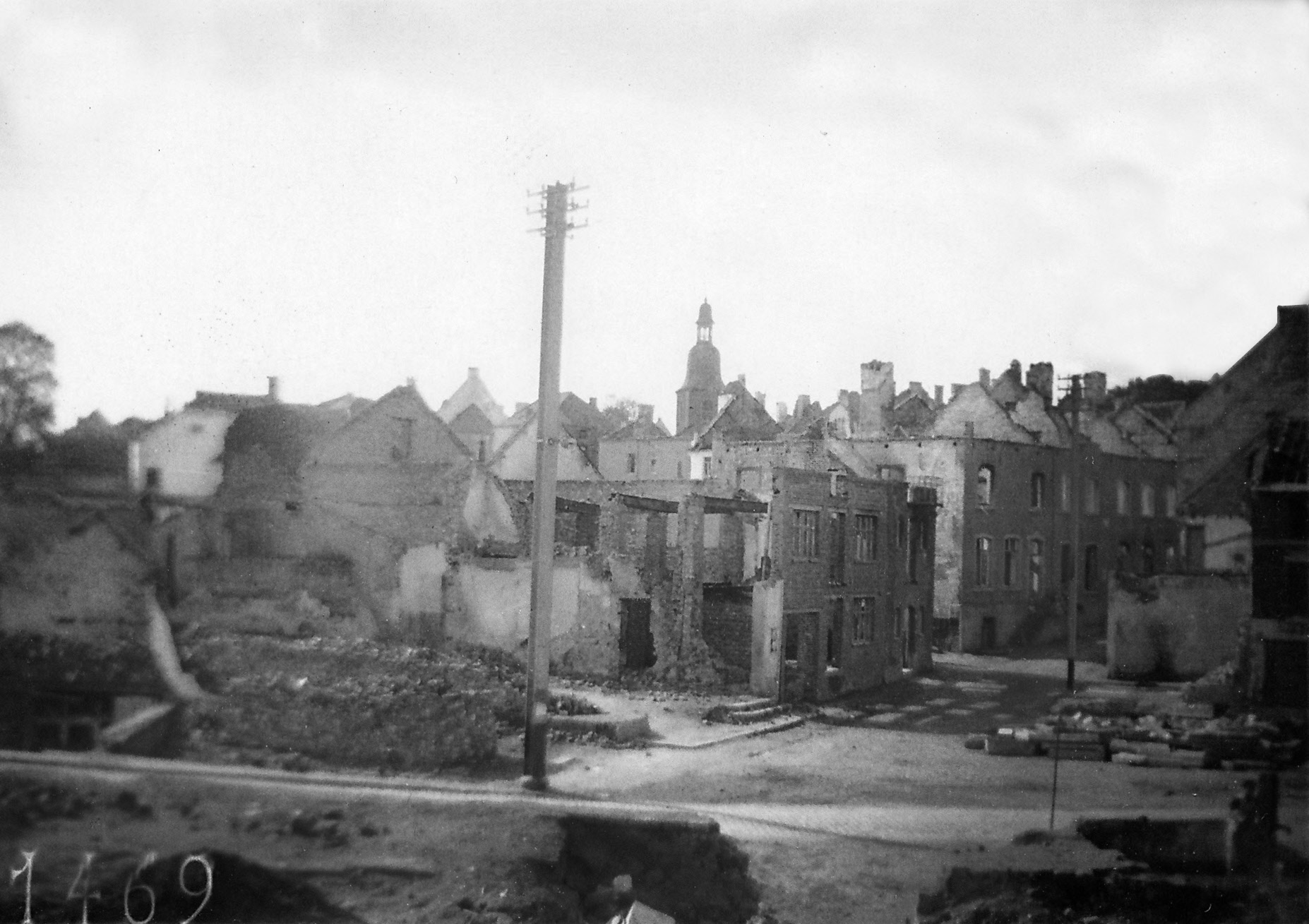
Destruction caused by the bombardment of May 13, 1940.

In the modern era (1500-1800) Perwez got a cloth hall and a wheats exchange halle aux grains. In 1511 it got an annual October market. In 1577 troops paid by the rebellious States General camped near Perwez.

During the Franco-Dutch War many houses and harvests were destroyed. The subsequent Nine Years' War was utterly ruinous for Perwez.

During the 19th century Perwez saw quite some industrialization based on agriculture. In 1870 there were two watermills, two windmills, two tanneries, three breweries and a râperie, linked to a central sugar factory.

The râperie was a very significant enterprise, which had 175 employees. It extracted juice from sugar beet, which was then sent by pipeline to the Wanze Sugar Factory. It was located on the Avenue de Rosaraie and closed down in 1959. Some remaining buildings are now used by a high-end restaurant.

During World War II Perwez suffered from an accidental disaster. On 13 May 1940, a French ammunition storage or mine in the center of town was hit and exploded. There were 33 casualties. The French then ignited other mines, leading to much destruction. On 6 September 1944 Perwez was liberated by the American 2nd Armored Division.

== Sights ==
=== Buildings ===
There are several protected sights in Perwez.

- Saint Roch chapel
- Several parts of the farm on Rue Trémouroux No 94 in Orbais
- Du Mont Farm
- La Petite Cense Farm
- Mellemont Farm
- Parts of the interior of the church of Saint Martin and Saint Roch in Thorembais-les-Béguines
- The tower of the church of Saint John
- The church and cemetery of Thorembais-Saint-Trond

=== Nature ===
West of Thorembais-Saint-Trond there are three natural reserves:.

- The wells of Thorembais
- The woods of Buis
- The swamps of Long-Pont

== Sources ==
- Antoine, André (2012). "Perwez d'hier et d'aujourd'hui" (PDF). Commune de Perwez.
