= Hannêche =

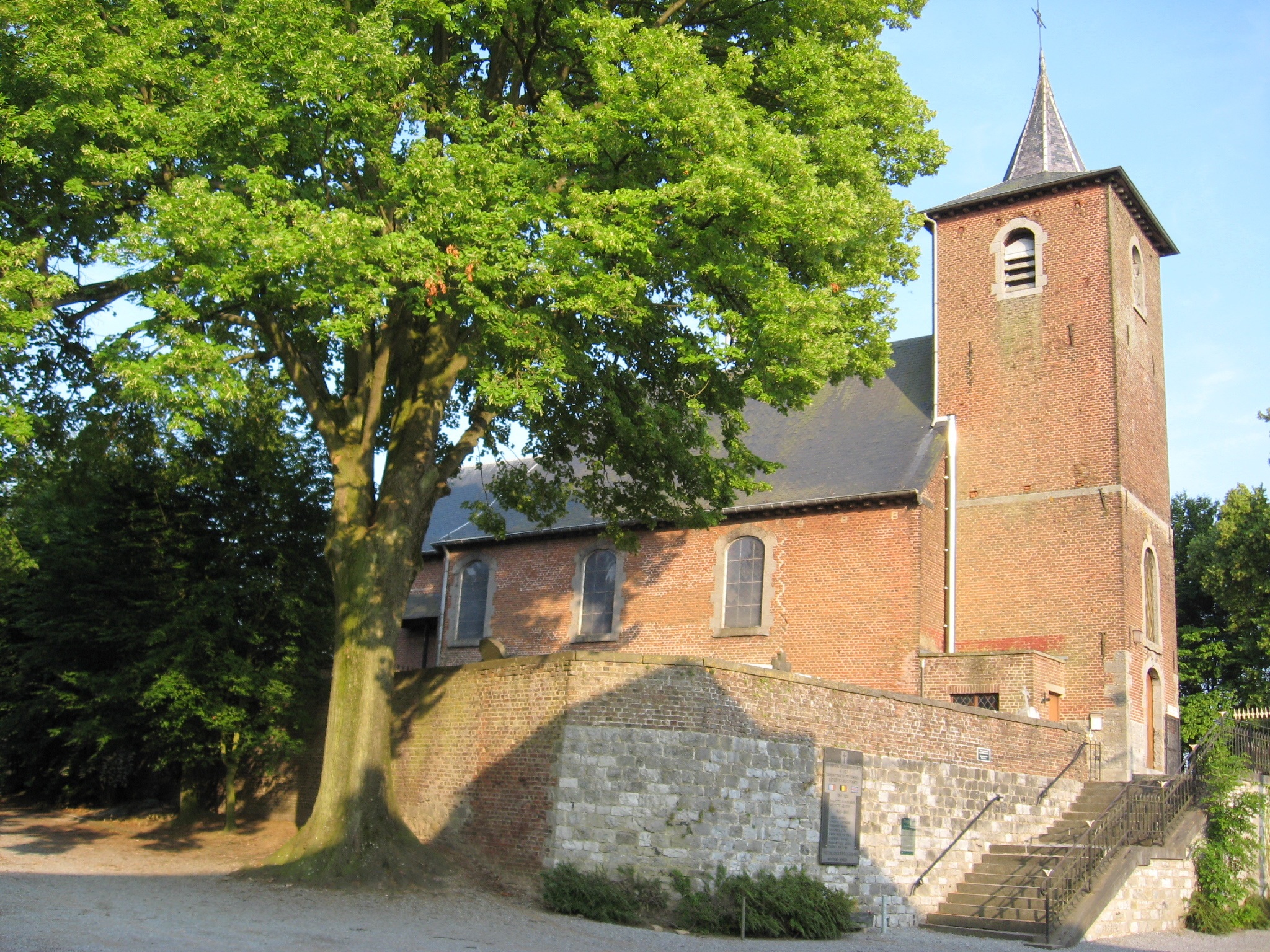
- Hannêche, village church

- Location within Belgium Location within Europe
- Coordinates: 50°34′00″N 05°02′00″E
- Country: Belgium
- Region: Wallonia
- Province: Liège
- Municipality: Burdinne

Hannêche (French pronunciation: [anɛʃ]) is a village in Wallonia and a district of the municipality of Burdinne, located in the province of Liège, Belgium.

== History ==
The site has been inhabited since the Neolithic. During the Middle Ages, it was subservient to the County of Namur and Saint Lambert's Cathedral, Liège also held rights and holdings in the village. In 1692 the village was burnt by the troops of Louis XIV of France.

== The village today ==
The current village church is from 1738.
