= Mechlin (disambiguation) =

Mechlin is the historical English name for the city of Mechelen in Belgium.

Mechlin lace, a type of lace originally produced in Mechelen

Mechlin may also refer to:

- Mechlin, Greater Poland Voivodeship (west-central Poland)
- Mechlin, Masovian Voivodeship (east-central Poland)

== See also ==
Mechelen (disambiguation)
