= List of protected heritage sites in Burdinne =

This table shows an overview of the protected heritage sites in the Walloon town Burdinne. This list is part of Belgium's national heritage.

Object	Year/architect	Town/section	Address	Coordinates	Number^{?}	Image
Church of the birth of the Holy Virgin ^{(nl)} ^{(fr)}		Burdinne		50.583715°N 5.073186°E	61010-CLT-0001-01 Info	Kerk van de geboorte van de Heilige Maagd: het koor
Old house ^{(nl)} ^{(fr)}		Burdinne	rue de la Burdinale, n°59	50.584271°N 5.092969°E	61010-CLT-0002-01 Info	
Tumulus of Vissoul ^{(nl)} ^{(fr)}		Burdinne	rue de Vissoul	50.597670°N 5.130820°E	61010-CLT-0003-01 Info	Tumulus van Vissoul en omgeving
Mechanical and hydraulic mill system with bakery ^{(nl)} ^{(fr)}		Burdinne	rue de la Burdinale, n°92	50.575941°N 5.143122°E	61010-CLT-0004-01 Info	
Grosse Tour farmhouse ^{(nl)} ^{(fr)}		Burdinne	rue de la Burdinale	50.584834°N 5.073782°E	61010-CLT-0005-01 Info	Boerderij "Grosse Tour"
Old house ^{(nl)} ^{(fr)}		Burdinne	rue de la Gare, n°14	50.581117°N 5.069741°E	61010-CLT-0006-01 Info	
17th century chartil ^{(nl)} ^{(fr)}		Burdinne	rue des Ecoles, n°7	50.583832°N 5.074452°E	61010-CLT-0007-01 Info	
Archeological site of the Tumulus of Vissoul ^{(nl)} ^{(fr)}		Burdinne	Campagne de la Tombe	50.597670°N 5.130820°E	61010-PEX-0001-01 Info	De archeologische site van de Tumulus van Vissoul op een plek genaamd "Campagne de la Tombe"

== See also ==
- List of protected heritage sites in Liège (province)
- Burdinne

== Bibliography ==
- Belgian heritage register: Direction générale opérationnelle - Aménagement du territoire, Logement, Patrimoine et Energie (DG4)
- www.dglive.be
