= Marneffe =

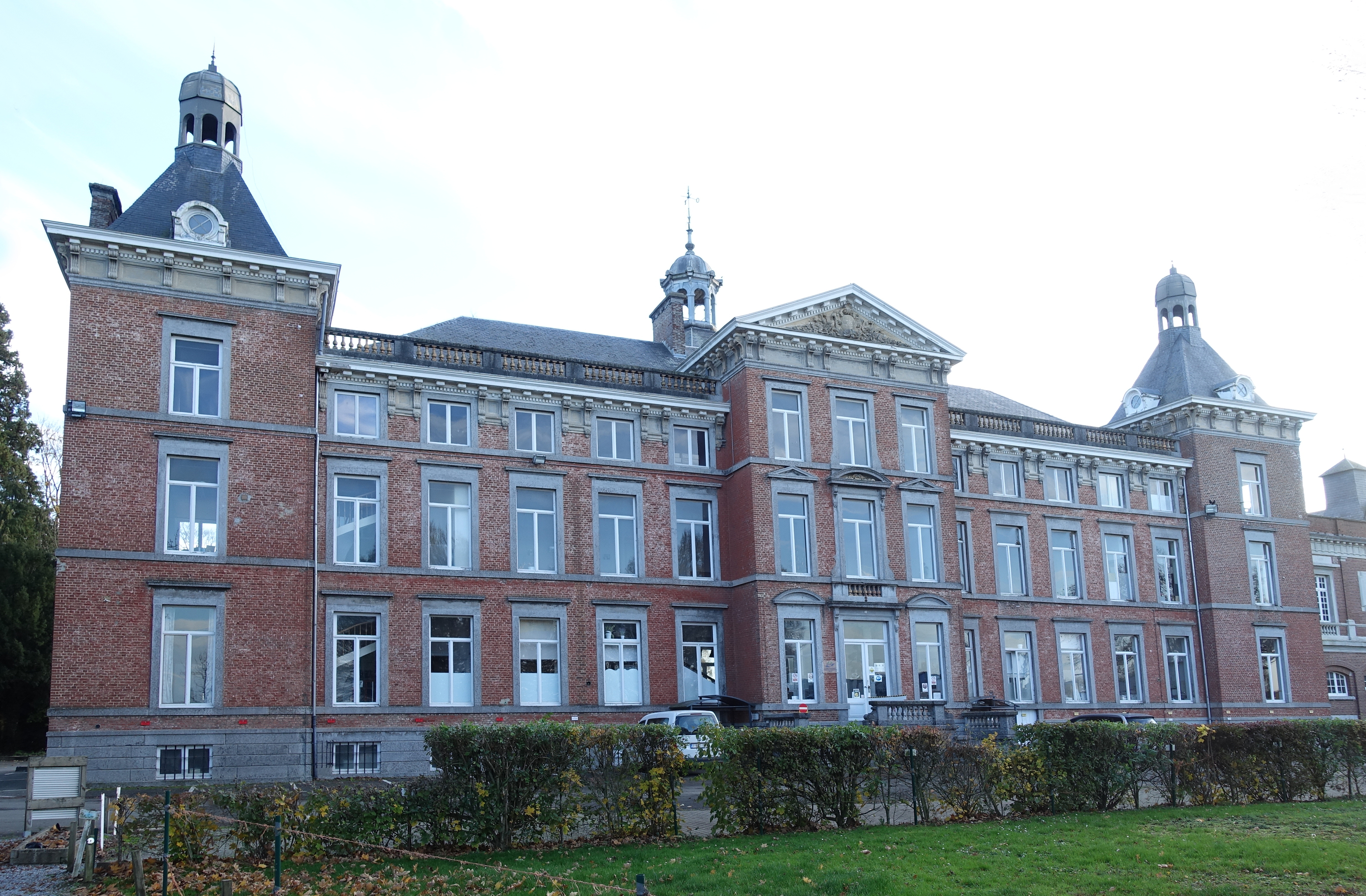
- Château du Sart (1870) in Marneffe

- Location within Belgium Location within Europe
- Coordinates: 50°34′01″N 05°07′58″E
- Country: Belgium
- Region: Wallonia
- Province: Liège
- Municipality: Burdinne

Marneffe is a district of the municipality of Burdinne, located in the province of Liège, Belgium.

The area has been inhabited since the Neolithic, as evidenced by archaeological finds. Before 1230 it was part of the County of Moha, but was then ceded to the Prince-Bishopric of Liège, who retained lordship of the village until 1619. It then passed to the lords of Fallais, and later to the barons of Berlaimont. Its feudal status was abolished following the Liège Revolution. A château, Château du Sart, was built in 1870 to plans by architect Émile Vierset-Godin. Since 1919 it has been the property of the Belgian State, and has been used as a correctional facility. The village church dates from 1848. There is also a mill in Marneffe that dates back to the 13th century; it was restored in 1984.
