= Oteppe =

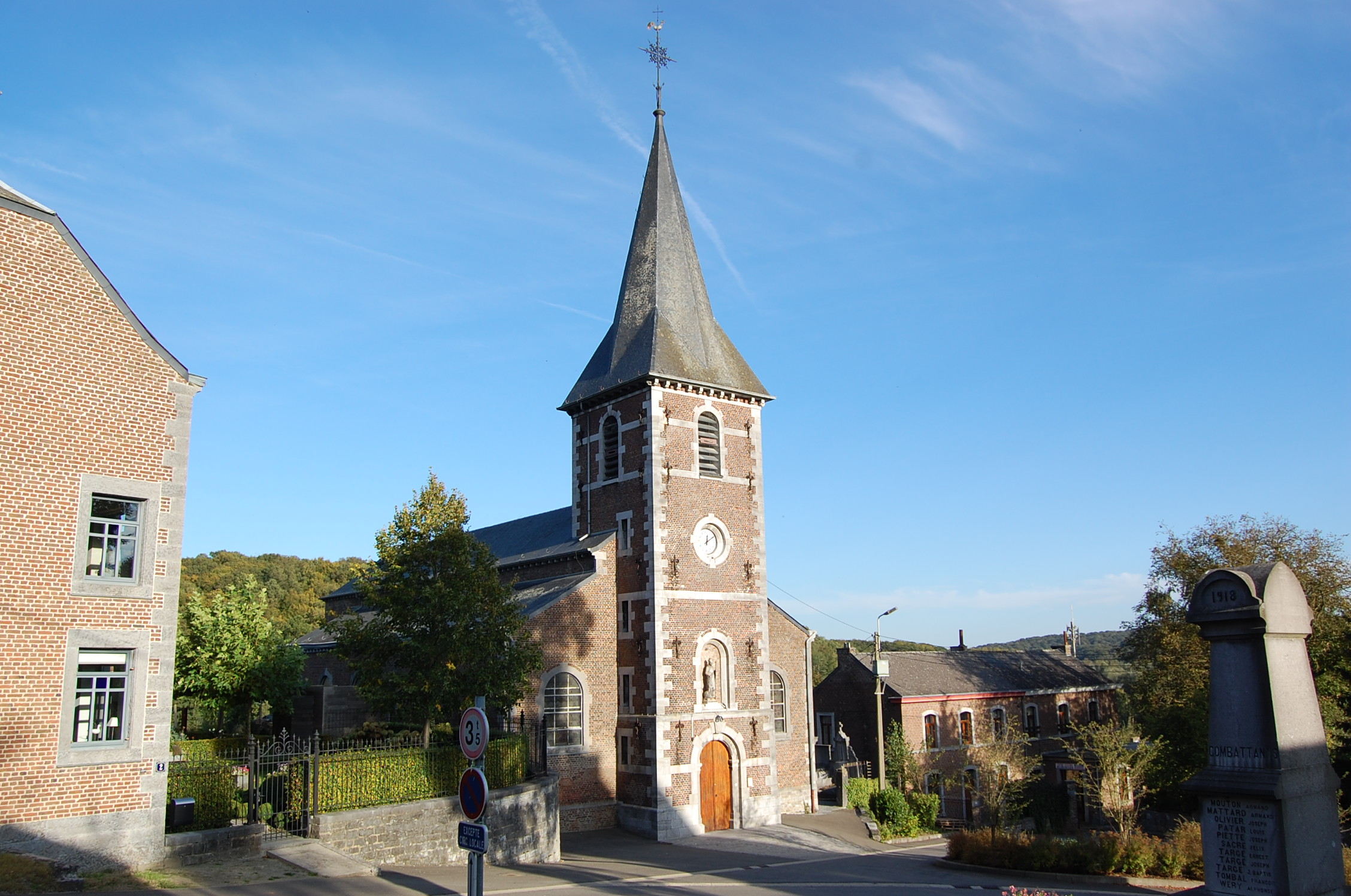
- Oteppe

- Location within Belgium Location within Europe
- Coordinates: 50°34′00″N 05°07′00″E
- Country: Belgium
- Region: Wallonia
- Province: Liège
- Municipality: Burdinne

Oteppe (French pronunciation: [ɔtɛp]) is a village in Wallonia and a district of the municipality of Burdinne, located in the province of Liège, Belgium.

The first written mention of the village dates from 1034, but the discovery of several Roman artifacts in the area indicate that it has been populated for a longer time. From the 13th century, it was part of the Prince-Bishopric of Liège. The village church dates from the 18th century but has medieval foundations. It was rebuilt into its present appearance in 1832. On a hill above the village lies a château, rebuilt and expanded in several stages. Its oldest parts date from the 16th century. Today it is part of a camping ground and holiday centre. A tumulus from c. 90 BC is located on a field in the vicinity of the village.
