= Knöppel (band) =

Swiss punk rock band

Knöppel is a Swiss punk rock trio formed in 2016. It is known for their obscene and scatological lyrics "in St. Gallen dialect".

The ban of Knöppel from the Grabenhalle venue of St. Gallen in 2023, prompted the discussion on the questions "What is art? How do you argue about taste? When is an audience wrong?" commenting on the sexism in Knöppel's lyrics.

In 2020, Joachim Schöneberger released a documentary short about the band, "a documentary about making music and getting older".

== Lineup ==
- Daniel "Midi" Mittag, frontman, singer, guitar; also goes under the stage name Jack Stoiker
- Marc Jenny, bass
- René Zosso, percussion

== Albums ==
- 2016: Hey Wichsers, debut album
- 2019Faszination Glied
- 2023: Sex Jazz Scheisse
