= Burdinne =

Municipality in Liège Province, Wallonia, Belgium

Burdinne Beurdene (Walloon)
- Municipality
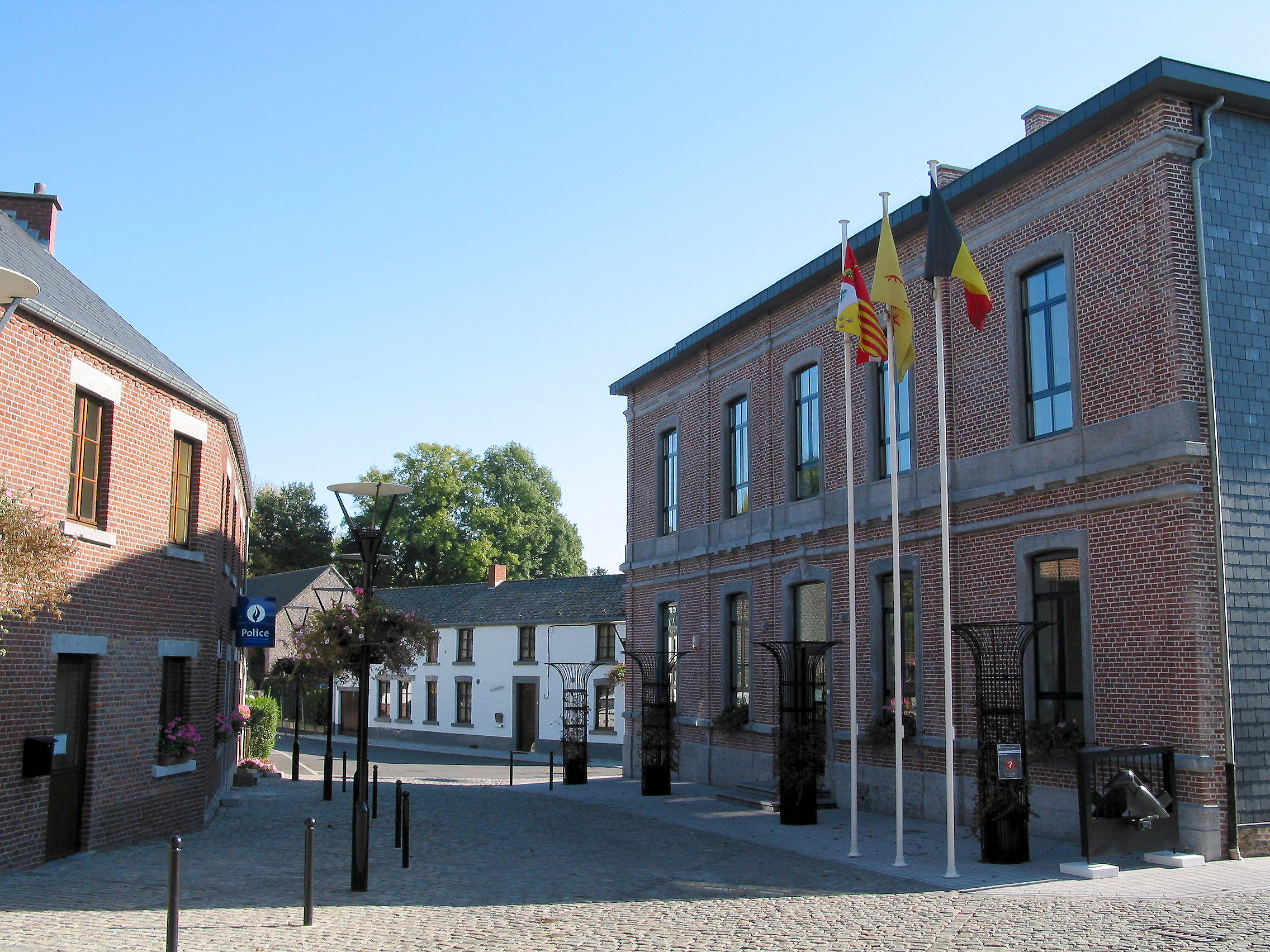

- Flag Coat of arms

- Location of Burdinne in the province of Liège
- Interactive map of Burdinne
- Location in Belgium
- Coordinates: 50°35′N 05°04′E
- Country: Belgium
- Community: French Community
- Region: Wallonia
- Province: Liège
- Arrondissement: Huy

Government
  - Mayor: Frédéric Bertrand (UPB)
  - Governing party: Unis pour Burdinne

Area
  - Total: 32.62 km^{2} (12.59 sq mi)

Population (2018-01-01)
  - Total: 3,236
  - Density: 99.20/km^{2} (256.9/sq mi)
- Postal codes: 4210
- NIS code: 61010
- Area codes: 085
- Website: www.burdinne.be

Burdinne (French pronunciation: [byʁdin]; Walloon: Beurdene) is a municipality of Wallonia located in the province of liège, Belgium.

On 1 January 2006 Burdinne had a total population of 2,824. The total area is 32.57 km^{2} which gives a population density of 87 inhabitants per km^{2}.

The municipality consists of the following districts: Burdinne, Hannêche, Lamontzée, Marneffe, Oteppe, and Vissoul.

The village gives its name to the nearby river Burdinale.

== Notable residents ==
- Félix Scalais (1904–1967), first archbishop of Léopoldville (current-day Kinshasa), born in Burdinne

== See also ==
- List of protected heritage sites in Burdinne
