= Heers =

Municipality in Limburg province, Belgium

- Municipality
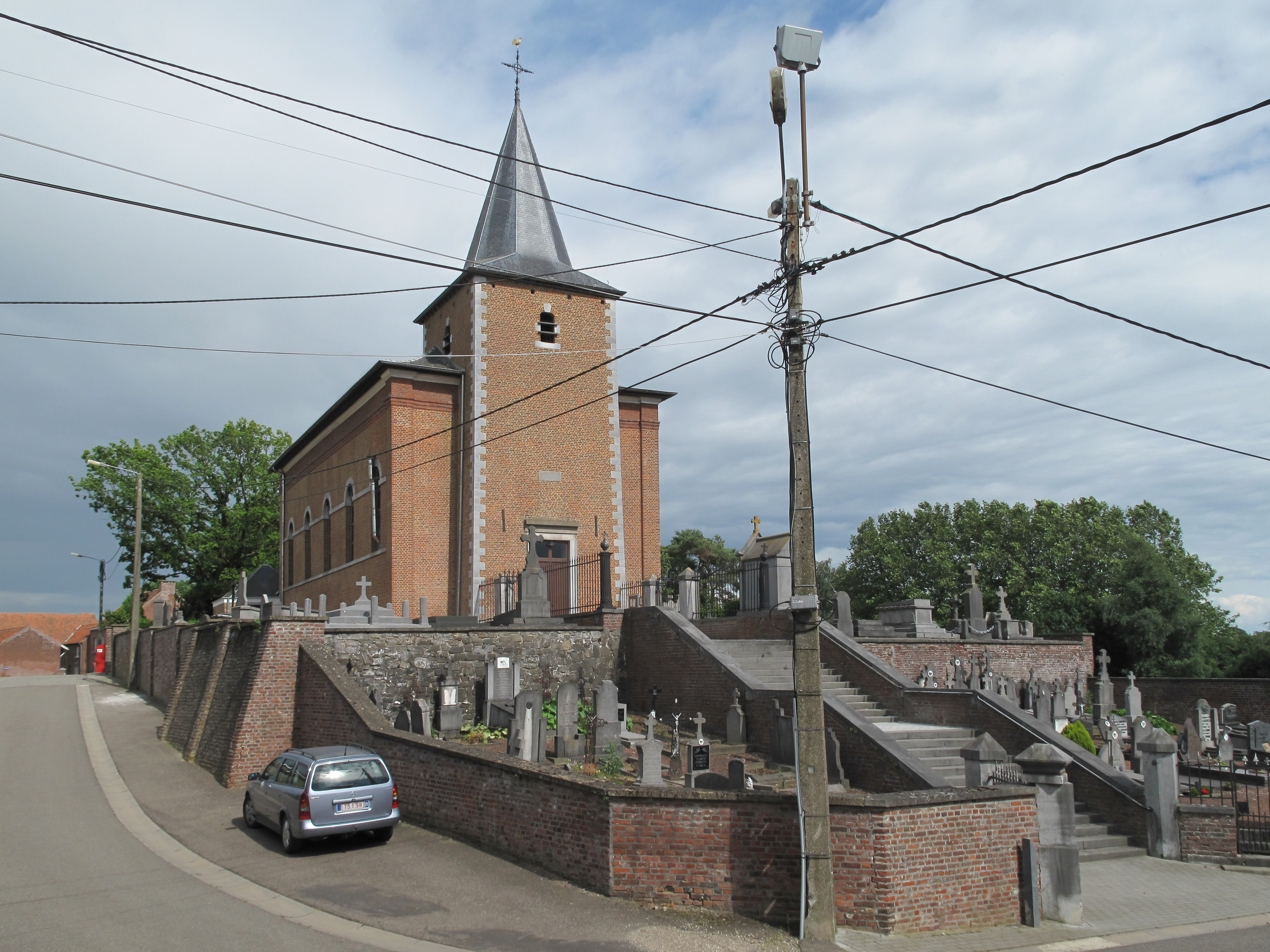
- Vechmaal: Sint Martinus church

- Flag Coat of arms

- Location of Heers in Limburg
- Interactive map of Heers
- Location in Belgium
- Coordinates: 50°45′N 05°17′E
- Country: Belgium
- Community: Flemish Community
- Region: Flemish Region
- Province: Limburg
- Arrondissement: Tongeren

Government
  - Mayor: Kristof Pirard (VLDumont)
  - Governing party: VLDumont

Area
  - Total: 53.06 km^{2} (20.49 sq mi)

Population (2018-01-01)
  - Total: 7,290
  - Density: 137/km^{2} (356/sq mi)
- Postal codes: 3870
- NIS code: 73022
- Area codes: 011
- Website: www.heers.be

Heers (Dutch pronunciation: [ˈɦeːrs], Limburgish: Hiër [ˈɦiəʀ]) is a municipality located in the Belgian province of Limburg.

== History ==
=== Merger municipality ===
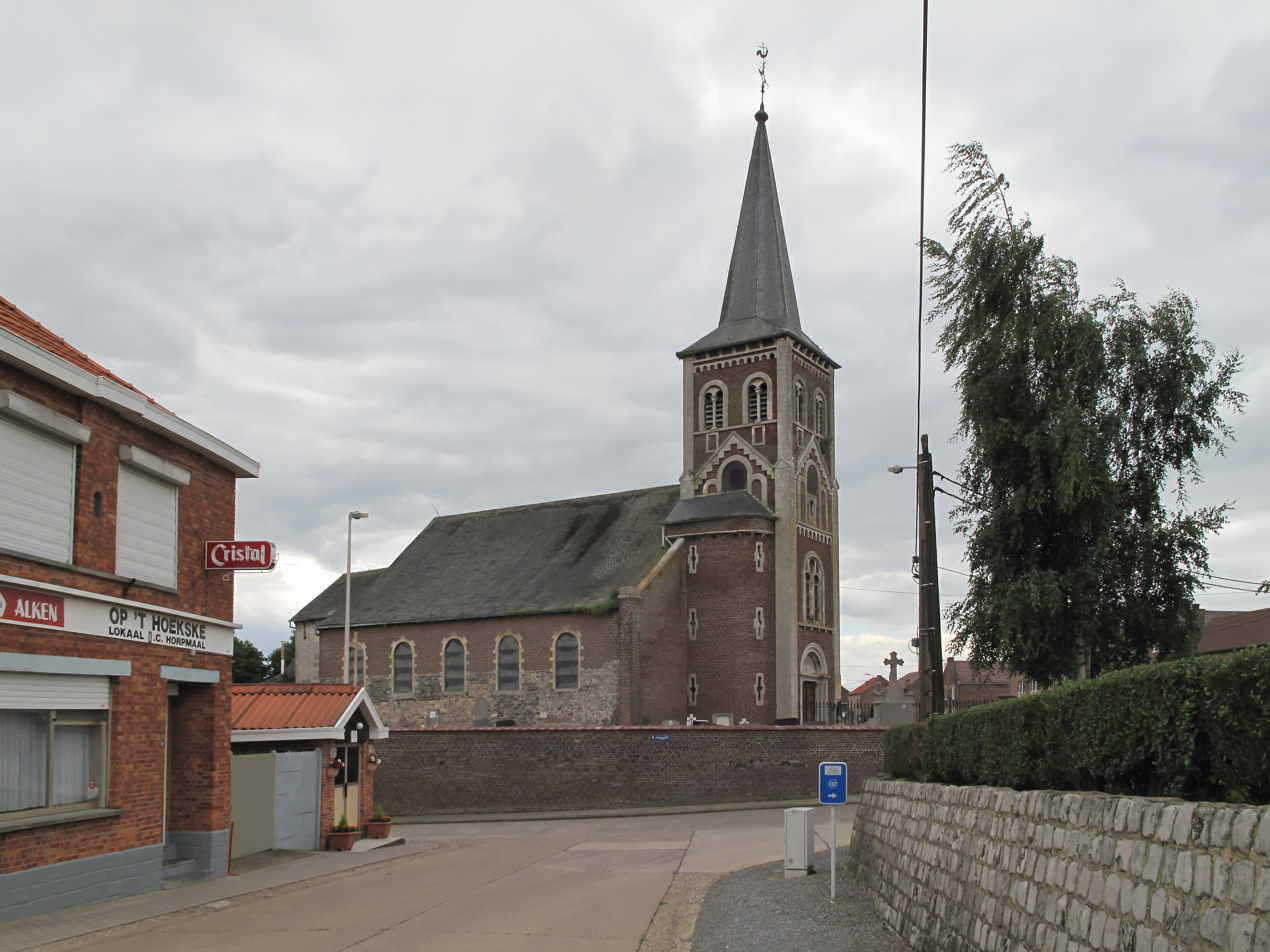
Horpmaal, church: de Sint Lambertuskerk

The municipality of Heers was formed by several mergers. In 1971:

- Heers was merged with Batsheers, Opheers, Veulen, Gutschoven and Mettekoven.
- Mechelen-Bovelingen and Rukkelingen-Loon were merged to form Bovelingen municipality
- Heks, Horpmaal, and Vechmaal were merged to form Heks municipality
- Klein-Gelmen was merged with Gelinden, Engelmanshoven and Groot Gelmen to form Gelmen municipality

In 1977 the current municipality of Heers was formed by merging:

- Heers municipality
- Bovelingen municipality
- Heks municipality
- Klein-Gelmen village (The rest of Gelmen was merged into the municipality of Sint-Truiden).
