= Wanze =

Municipality in Liège Province, Wallonia, Belgium

Wanze Wônse (Walloon)
- Municipality
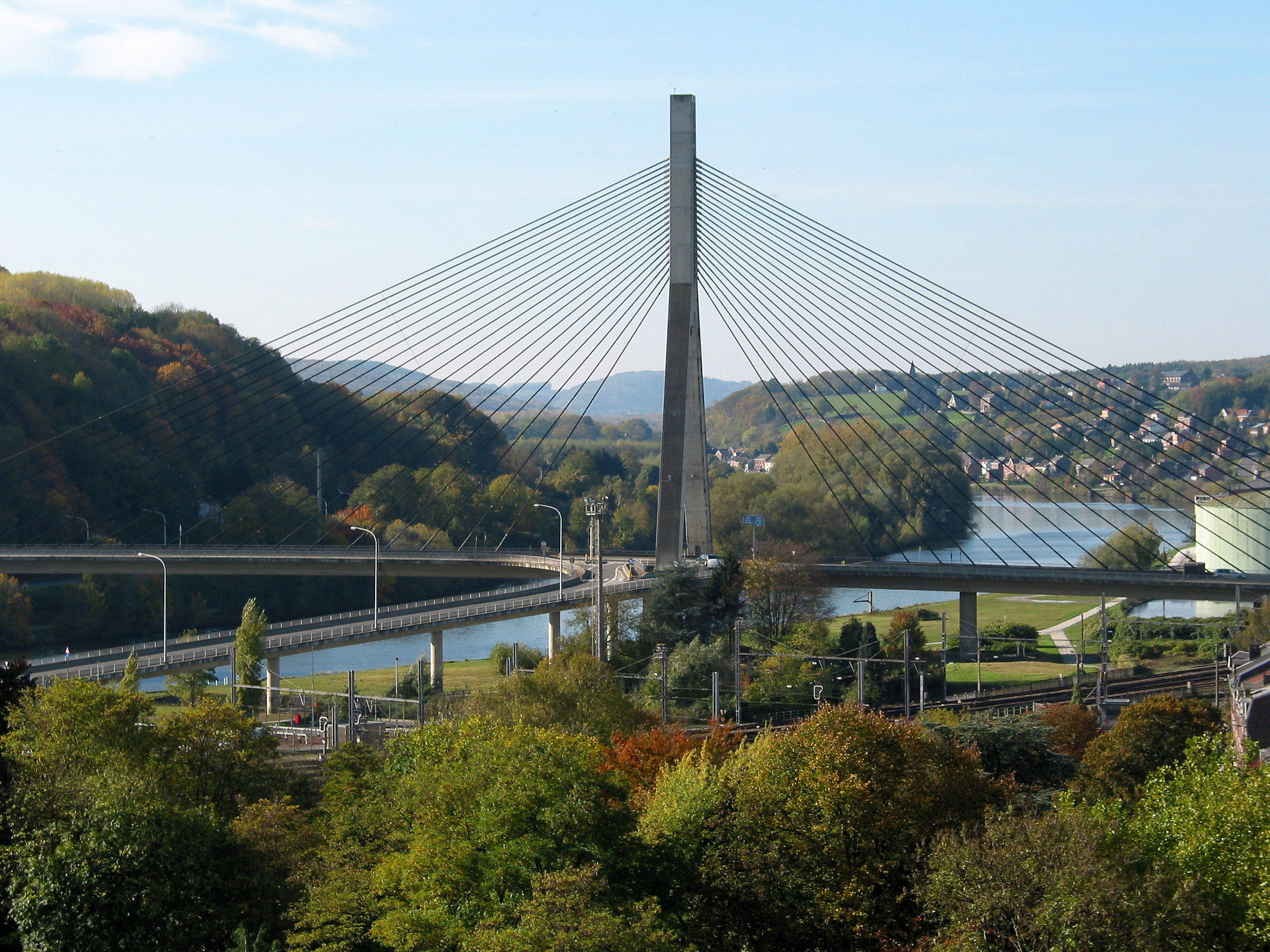
- Père Pire bridge, Wanze Sugar Factory to the right

- Flag Coat of arms

- Location of Wanze in the province of Liège
- Interactive map of Wanze
- Location in Belgium
- Coordinates: 50°32′N 05°13′E
- Country: Belgium
- Community: French Community
- Region: Wallonia
- Province: Liège
- Arrondissement: Huy

Government
  - Mayor: Christophe Lacroix (PS)
  - Governing party: PS

Area
  - Total: 44.04 km^{2} (17.00 sq mi)

Population (2018-01-01)
  - Total: 13,576
  - Density: 308.3/km^{2} (798.4/sq mi)
- Postal codes: 4520
- NIS code: 61072
- Area codes: 085
- Website: www.wanze.be

Wanze (French pronunciation: [wɑ̃z]; Walloon: Wônse) is a municipality of Wallonia located in the province of Liège, Belgium.

== Municipality ==
The municipality consists of the following districts: Antheit, Bas-Oha, Huccorgne, Moha, Vinalmont, and Wanze.

== Economy ==
Wanze Sugar Factory is a very important company in the area.

== Notable residents ==
- Paul Delvaux (1897–1994), painter, born in Antheit
- Frédéric François (born 1950), singer, resident of Antheit

== See also ==
- List of protected heritage sites in Wanze
