= Râperie =

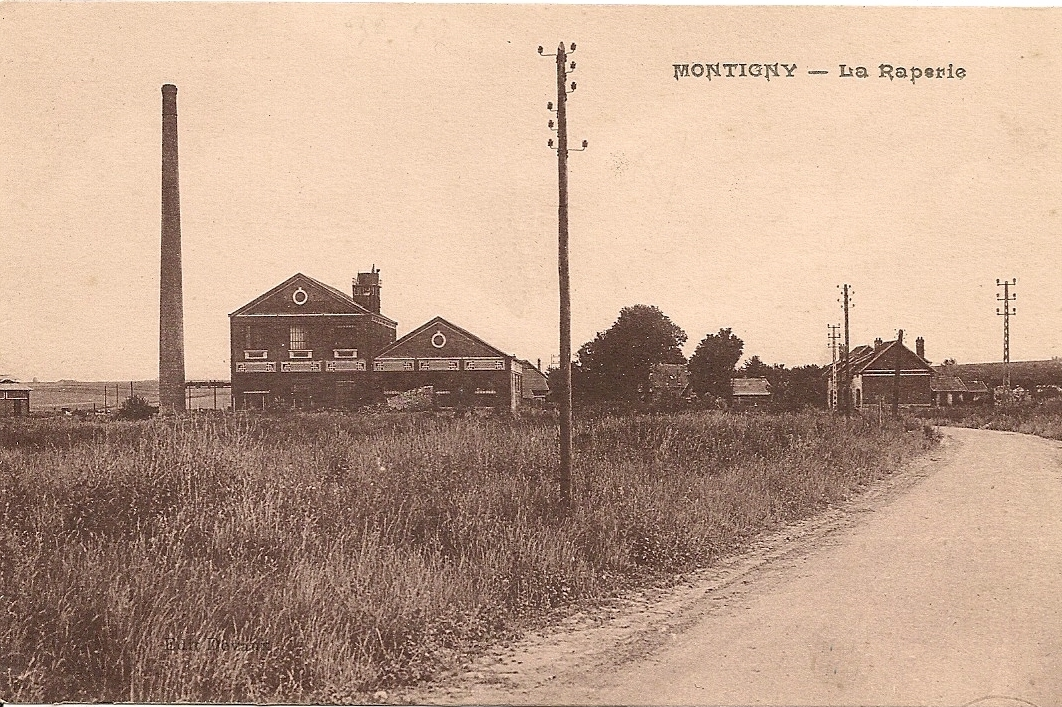
Râperie of Montigny-la-Cour in 1950 in Hervilly, France

A râperie is a small factory depending on a central sugar factory. In a râperie sugar beet are grated and the juice is extracted before it is transported to a central sugar factory. By 2023 the Râperie de Longchamps connected to the Wanze Sugar Factory in Belgium was the only remaining operational râperie.

== Characteristics ==
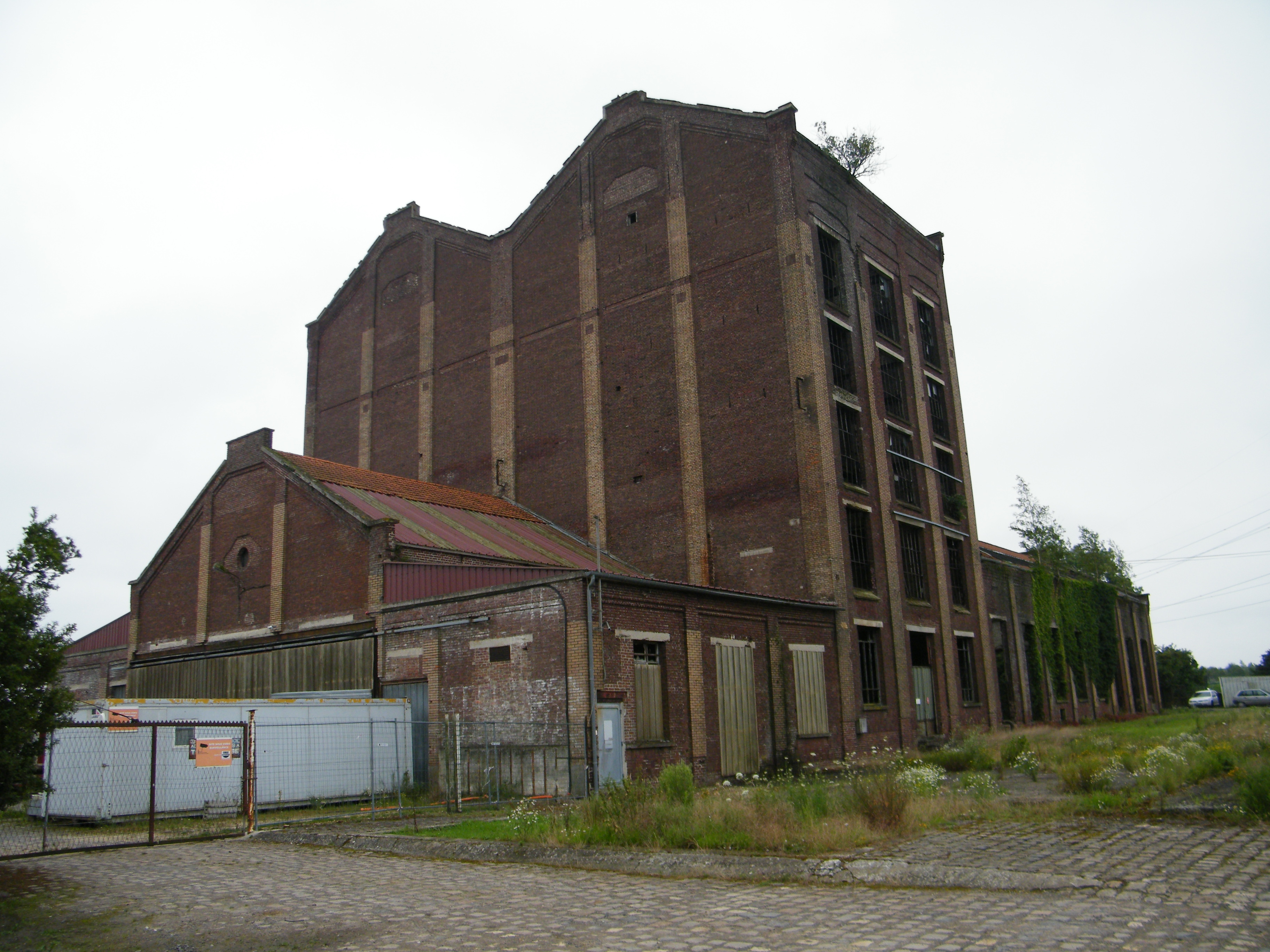
Old râperie / distillery of Génermont in Fresnes-Mazancourt

A râperie consists of:

- A weighbridge for weighing the sugar beet
- A reception area where the beet are stored temporarily
- An installation to wash the beet
- A machine that slices the beet into cossettes (le râpage des betteraves en cossettes);
- Diffusers which extract the raw juice by leaching.

In a final step before transport, some milk of lime is added to the raw juice to prevent oxidation. The raw juice is then transported to a main beet sugar factory by an underground pipeline. In the main factory the raw juice undergoes the final steps to produce sugar.

The hydraulic transport from the râperie to the sugar factory is aided by pumping stations. The pipelines can stretch for dozen kilometers, and can consist of a network of connected râperies.

== History ==
=== High road transport costs ===
In the early 19th century, there were two options to transport sugar beet to a sugar factory. In France most beet were transported by wagons drawn by oxen or horses. This limited the maximum distance over which it was economically feasible to transport sugar beet to about 5 or 6 km. Speed was slow, and a wagon could transport only a very limited tonnage. These constraints severely limited the flow of resources to a sugar factory, which was a major concern for the owners.

Inland navigation was the only serious alternative to transport by wagon. In e.g. the Netherlands and Flanders, a wagon only had to make a very short trip from the field to one of the many boats which sailed a finely grained network of canals.

In short, the main problem that limited the scale of a sugar factory in an area without a fine grained network of canals, was the huge cost of transport by wagon. While sugar beet had a sugar content of just somewhat over 10%, almost 90% of these costs were made to transport parts of the beet which were not required to make sugar. This was even worse than it seemed, because the beet pulp which was produced by the sugar factory also had to be transported back to the farmer and was therefore of only limited value.

=== Invention ===
The high transport cost caused that most of the French beet sugar factories could not achieve the scale at which it was profitable to invest in more modern machinery. This is how the idea for a division of labour between a central sugar factory and outlying râperies, which would feed it with raw juice, came up. It was published in 1858, including the use of the word râperie. However, explaining the economic theory behind the concept was something very different from inventing a practical way to realize it.

A practical way to realize a râperie which fed a central sugar factory was invented by the sugar engineer Jules Linard (1832-1882). He devised the râperie as a place to extract the raw juice from the sugar beet by diffusion close to where the beet were grown. The juice was then transported to the sugar factory by means of an underground cast iron pipe line, which was the real invention. Linard first applied the process in November 1867, when the râperie of Saint-Acquaire also known as Boncourt opened. This fed the sugar factory of Montcornet, Aisne located 8 kilometers from the râperie. The Montcornet factory had been built in the previous year and was directed by Linard's brother Adolphe-Désiré Linard.

=== Relevance of the râperie ===
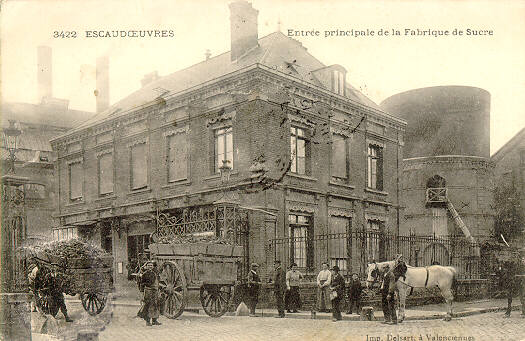
Gate of the Sucrerie d'Escaudœuvres

The introduction of the râperie led to a profound change in the sugar industry, in particular in France and southern Belgium. The small râperies eliminated the high transport cost of sugar beet in areas that had no waterways. The convoys of wagons were replaced by hydraulic transport by pumps or gravity. This greatly increased the area from which a beet sugar factory could process sugar beet.

In 1872 Jules Linard founded his own sugar factory. This is now the Sucrerie centrale de Cambrai also known as Sucrerie d'Escaudœuvres. It originally consisted of a central sugar factory fed by 17 râperies. By the end of the 19th century, it was the biggest sugar factory of the world.

By 1884 there were 527 sugar factories in France. Some processed only 5 or 6,000 t of beet, while a handful of others were very large, the Usine Centrale de Cambrai even processing 160,000 t. These super large factories had been made possible by râperies. At the time, there were 150 râperies feeding 57 central factories. The one of Cambrai had 21 or 22 râperies, that of Origny-Sainte-Benoite and Meaux each had 13. Many sugar factories or distilleries had 3 or 4 râperies. Many had one or two, apart from the one in the central factory itself. Some small sugar factories were converted to râperies.

In Belgium the idea of the râperie and central factory was picked up by the Sucreries de Wanze.

In the Netherlands, the Sugar Factory Zeeland in Bergen op Zoom was expanded by adding a new building at some distance from the old factory and connecting it to the old factory by tubing. This did not make it a true râperie, because it did not maintain the râperie machinery on the old location. Apart from this example, the Dutch beet sugar factories had little use for the idea, because they could very well be reached by inland navigation.

The advent of the truck and much better roads would finally lead to the demise of the râperie. The decentral râperies processed only a limited tonnage of beet in comparison to the increased scale of sugar factories. E.g. in Picardy about 60 râperies on average processed only 150 t of beet per day before 1914. In time, the decreased transport cost made it more economical to close the râperies and to use trucks to transport the beet to a central factory with more efficient machinery for washing, slicing and diffusing.

=== Today ===
The last operational râperie of the world is the Râperie de Longchamps, which feeds the Sugar Factory Wanze.

Many old râperies still dot the landscape of France, especially in the north.
