= List of protected heritage sites in Jemeppe-sur-Sambre =

This table shows an overview of the protected heritage sites in the Walloon town Jemeppe-sur-Sambre. This list is part of Belgium's national heritage.

Object	Year/architect	Town/section	Address	Coordinates	Number^{?}	Image
Facades and roofs of the Castle of Mielmont ^{(nl)} ^{(fr)}		Jemeppe-sur-Sambre	Onoz	50.497790°N 4.672395°E	92140-CLT-0001-01	
Donjon of Villeret and the ensemble of the keep and its surrounding area ^{(nl)} ^{(fr)}		Jemeppe-sur-Sambre	Jemeppe-sur-Sambre	50.508251°N 4.651285°E	92140-CLT-0004-01	Donjon van Villeret en het ensemble van de donjon en zijn omliggende terrein
Ensemble of the watermill and its environment ^{(nl)} ^{(fr)}		Jemeppe-sur-Sambre	Onoz	50.491667°N 4.670179°E	92140-CLT-0005-01	Ensemble van de watermolen en omgeving
Cave of the man of Spy and the ensemble of the cave and surrounding area ^{(nl)} ^{(fr)}		Jemeppe-sur-Sambre	Spy	50.480204°N 4.674499°E	92140-CLT-0006-01	Grot van de man van Spy en het ensemble van de grot en de omliggende terreinen More images
Facades and roofs of the Castle of Balâtre and establishing conservation ^{(nl)} ^{(fr)}		Jemeppe-sur-Sambre		50.498598°N 4.636809°E	92140-CLT-0007-01	Gevels en daken van de kasteelhoeve Balâtre en oprichting beschermingszone More images
Facades and roofs of the ensemble of the water station and two technical buildings ^{(nl)} ^{(fr)}		Jemeppe-sur-Sambre	Route d'Eghezée 301-303, Onoz	50.483437°N 4.665925°E	92140-CLT-0008-01	
The keep of Villeret ^{(nl)} ^{(fr)}		Jemeppe-sur-Sambre		50.508119°N 4.651084°E	92140-PEX-0001-01	De donjon van Villeret
Ensemble of the cave of the man of Spy and the surrounding area ^{(nl)} ^{(fr)}		Jemeppe-sur-Sambre	Spy	50.483469°N 4.670151°E	92140-PEX-0002-01	Ensemble van de grot van de man van Spy en de omliggende terreinen More images

== See also ==
- List of protected heritage sites in Namur (province)
