= Geological Society of Belgium =

Learned society for Belgian geologists

- Formation: 18 January 1874
- Founder: Gustave Dewalque
- Founded at: Liège, Belgium
- Region served: Belgium
- Official language: French

The Geological Society of Belgium (French: Société géologique de Belgique) was a learned society for Belgian geologists in the 1870s. It was established by Gustave Dewalque in Liège to promote the study of minerals, understand Belgium's soil in relation to industry and agriculture, and contribute to scientific progress.

== History ==
Belgium's first geological society was established on the initiative of Professor Gustave Dewalque. The Geological Society of Belgium was founded in 1874 in Liège, Belgium. The Belgium Geological Society held its first session at the University of Liège on January 18, 1874, with 183 geologists and engineers from all over Belgium present. Professor Laurent-Guillaume de Koninck was selected as the first president of the society during the meeting. Dewalque was elected as the general secretary, serving from 1874 to 1898 and was later named Honorary General Secretary. The administration of the society was entrusted to a council of geology professors and mining engineers. Belgian geologist Alphonse Briart was elected president of the council for the year 1874–1875 with vice-presidential positions that were filled by Charles de la Vallée-Poussin, Felix Jochams, and Victor Bouhy.

=== Publication ===
In 1874, the society began publishing the journal Annales de la Société Géologique de Belgique (English: Annals of the Geological Society of Belgium) in Liége on Rue Saint-Adalbert. By 1998, the publication was integrated into the journal, the Geologica Belgica.
