= Gustave Dewalque =

Belgian physician, geologist, paleontologist and mineralogist

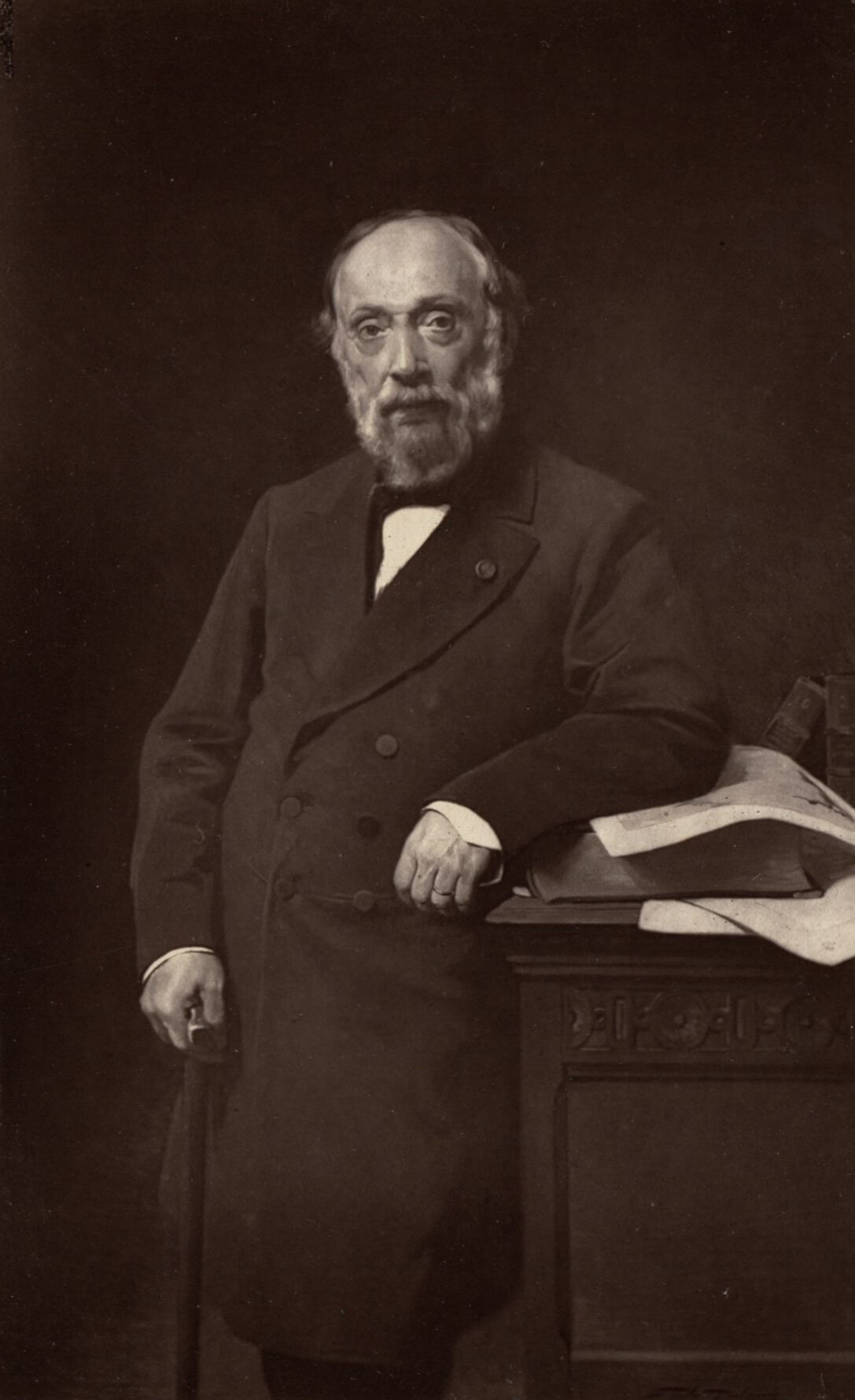
Image of Gustave Dewalque

Gilles Joseph Gustave Dewalque (2 December 1826, Stavelot — 3 November 1905, Liège) was a Belgian physician, geologist, paleontologist, and mineralogist.

== Biography ==
Gustave Dewalque studied medicine at the University of Liège and in 1852 during the cholera epidemic in Liège practiced medicine in the city's hospitals. He graduated in 1853 as doctor of medicine at the University of Liège. There he continued his studies at the Faculté des sciences and in 1854 graduated as docteur en sciences naturelles. In 1855 at the University of Liège, Dewalque was appointed tutor for the mineralogy and geology courses, as well as curator of the mineralogical collections. The unexpected death of André Dumont in February 1857 led to Dewalque's appointment as an interim replacement for Dumont. In July 1857 Dewalque completed his special doctorate in mineralogy. His dissertation gave a thorough description of the Lias (Lower Jurassic) of the province of Luxembourg. At the University of Liège he was appointed in September 1857 professor extraordinarius and in October 1865 professor ordinarius of mineralogy, geology and paleontology. Dewalque published over 550 articles, including 118 notes for the Biographie nationale de Belgique.

He was the coauthor with Félicien Chapuis of the 1854 book Mémoire en réponse à la question suivante: Faire la description des fossiles des terrains secondaires de la province de Luxembourg, et donner l'indication précise des localités et des systèmes de roches dans lesquels ils se trouvent, which won a gold medal. In 1860 Dewalque identified the red marble of Frasnes as the fossilized remains of an ancient coral reef. Dewalque was interested in hydrogeology (as was André Dumont) and did research on the mineral waters of Belgium and, especially, the Ardennes.

Almost all of Andre Dumont's research on the Paleozoic had been published before his untimely death, but his notes about the Mesozoic, the Cenozoic, and the end of the Paleozoic were unpublished. Gustave Dewalque used Dumont's unpublished notes together with new knowledge about Belgian geology to publish the 1868 book Prodrome d'une description géologique de la Belgique. The book was the first synthesis of what was known about the geology of Belgium and the Ardennes and was acclaimed as a veritable encyclopedia of Belgian geology.

Gustave Dewalque's cartographic works were important for Belgian geology. In 1879, he published Carte géologique de la Belgique et des provinces voisines (Geological map of Belgium and neighboring provinces) at the scale of 1/500,000, updating André Dumont's 1849 map, which had a scale of 1/800,000 and was long out of print. Dewalque published a second edition in 1903. His last major publication was Essai de carte tectonique de la Belgique et des provinces voisines, published in 1905. The successor in his professorial chair was Max Lohest.

By appealing to his former students working in various mines, Dewalque gradually created a remarkable collection of Belgian and foreign rocks and fossils. The former students were asked to send him fossils they discovered and to carefully note the fossils' origin in terms of geography and stratigraphy. Apart from his 1854 book with Chapuis, Dewalque's contributions to paleontology were not outstanding — except for the considerable collection of invertebrate fossils assembled by him at the University of Liège. His valuable collections of fossil invertebrates caused paleontologists to name several fossil invertebrate species (dewalquei) in his honor. A fossil genus of dicotyledonous angiosperms is named Dewalquea in his honor.

Gustave Dewalque was a member of many learned societies. He was elected in December 1854 a corresponding member and in 1859 a full member of the Royal Academy of Belgium. He was elected in 1870 the president of the Royal Academy of Belgium and in 1880 a Foreign Member of the Geological Society of London. The House of Savoy appointed him an Officer of the Order of Saints Maurice and Lazarus. In 1888 he was awarded honorary membership of the Manchester Literary and Philosophical Society. In 1892 the King of Belgium appointed him Commandeur de l’ordre de Léopold. In 1899 he received the F.V. Hayden Medal from the Academy of Natural Sciences of Philadelphia.

Rue Gustave Dewalque is a street in Stavelot named in his honor.

In 1876 he married Céline Lambotte. They became the parents of two daughters. Their daughter Teresa was married to Ubric Le Paige and became the mother of eleven sons. One of the sons was Gustave (Gustavo) Le Paige, a Belgian Jesuit, ethnographer, and archaeologist, who became a Chilean citizen known for his archaeological discoveries in Chile.

== Société géologique de Belgique ==
At the beginning of December 1873, Gustave Dewalque held an informal meeting at his home with several of his friends involved with geology. He proposed the creation of a Belgian geological society (the nation's first) to spread information, to encourage research, and to provide a new avenue of publication for Belgians studying geology, mineralogy, and paleontology. The goals were not merely academic but also industrial and agricultural — to increase knowledge about mining and Belgian soil composition. Dewalque's proposal was enthusiastically endorsed, and he wrote letters to many colleagues, all of whom agreed to support the project. A provisional committee of geology professors and mining engineers was formed with nineteen members, including Alphonse Briart, Charles de la Vallée-Poussin, and Laurent-Guillaume de Koninck. On the 29th of December 1873, 500 copies of an invitation were sent to doctors of science and engineers for whom the committee had addresses. The first general meeting of the Société géologique de Belgique was held in Liège on January 18, 1874. At the meeting were 183 geologists and engineers from all over Belgium. Laurent-Guillaume de Koninck was elected president for 1874. Gustave Dewalque was the general secretary from 1874 to 1898. The Société, closely associated with the University of Liège, published an analytical catalog of minerals found in Belgium, maintained a library and a collection of minerals, and published the journal Annales de la Société géologique de Belgique.

In 1994 the society Geologica Belgica, with headquarters in Brussels, was formed from the merger of the Société géologique de Belgique with Société Belge de Géologie, de Paléontologie et d’Hydrologie (which was established in 1887 in Brussels). The Annales de la Société géologique de Belgique was published in 120 volumes from 1874 to 1997.

== Mineral names: "ardennite" versus "dewalquite" ==
In December 1872, Félix Pisani published his discovery (at Salmchâteau) of a new mineral, which he named "dewalquite" in honor of Gustave Dewalque. However, the new mineral described by Pisani was remarkably similar to a new mineral, which had been described by Arnold von Lasaulx in an October 1872 publication and named "ardennite" (due to the discovery of the mineral in the Ardennes near the village Ottré, not far from Vielsalm). The two mineralogists had a long dispute concerning the new mineral. The name "dewalquite" was still commonly used by Belgian mineralogists in the middle of the 20th century, but now the mineral ardennite is accepted by the International Mineralogical Association with the name "dewalquite" regarded as a synonym.

== Selected publications ==
- Dewalque, G. (1854). Note sur les divers étages qui constituent le lias moyen et le lias supérieur dans le Luxembourg. Bulletin de la société géologique de France, 2^{e} série, 11, 546–561.
- Dewalque, G. (1857). Observations critiques sur l’âge des grès liassiques du Luxembourg, avec une carte géologique des environs d’Arlon. Bulletins de l’Académie royale des Sciences, des Lettres et des Beaux-Arts de Belgique, 2e série, 2, 343–354.
- Dewalque, G. (1860). Atlas de cristallographie à l’usage des élèves du cours de minéralogie. Liége, Noblet, 16 p.
- Dewalque, G. (1861). Sur la constitution du système eifélien dans le bassin anthraxifère du Condros. Bulletins de l’Académie royale des Sciences, des Lettres et des Beaux-Arts de Belgique, 2e série, 11, 64–83.
- Dewalque, G. (1862). Notice sur le système eifelien dans le bassin de Namur. Bulletins de l’Académie royale des Sciences, des Lettres et des Beaux-Arts de Belgique, 2^{e} série, 13, 146–155.
- Dewalque, G. (1863). Procès-verbal de la réunion extraordinaire de la Société géologique de France à Liège, du 30 août au 6 septembre 1863. Bulletin de la Société géologique de France, 2^{e} série, 20, 761–878.
- Dewalque, G. (1864). Sur la distribution des eaux minérales en Belgique. Bulletins de l’Académie royale des Sciences, des Lettres et des Beaux-Arts de Belgique, 2^{e} série, 17, 151–153.
- Dewalque, G. (1864). Rapport sur l’eau minérale du puits artésien d’Ostende. Bulletins de l’Académie royale des Sciences, des Lettres et des Beaux-Arts de Belgique, 2^{e} série, 18, 121–124.
- Dewalque, G. (1868). Prodrome d’une description géologique de la Belgique. Liège, Decq, 442 p.
- Dewalque, G. (1873). Davreux (Charles-Joseph). Biographie nationale, 4, col. 733–735.
- Dewalque, G. (1873). Rapport séculaire sur les travaux de la Classe des Sciences : Sciences minérales. Extrait du Livre commémoratif du centième anniversaire de l’Académie (1772–1872). Bruxelles, F. Hayez, 90 p.
- Dewalque, G. (1875). Fossiles du Diluvium crayeux de Sainte-Walburge, à Liège. Annales de la Société géologique de Belgique, 2, B67.
- Dewalque, G. (1877). Un grand Ichthyodorulite ou rayon de nageoire d’un poisson du calcaire carbonifère inférieur. Annales de la Société géologique de Belgique, 5, B59–B60.
- Dewalque, G. (1879). Carte géologique de la Belgique et des provinces voisines. Annales de la Société géologique de Belgique, 6, Bibliographie, 3–17.
- Dewalque, G. (1881). Fragments paléontologiques : sur une algue nouvelle de la craie; une algue nouvelle des psammites du Condroz; un nouveau crustacé phyllopode; Leperdita briarti; Crania corneti; Protaster descheni. Annales de la Société géologique de Belgique, 8, M43–M54.
- Dewalque, G. (1895). Sur la faune des calcschistes de Tournai, tournaisien d. Annales de la Société géologique de Belgique, 23, M19–M27.
- Dewalque, G. (1903). Carte géologique de la Belgique et des provinces voisines : seconde édition : notice explicative. Annales de la Société géologique de Belgique, 31, BB3–BB10.
- Dewalque, G. (1903). Carte géologique de la Belgique et des provinces voisines. 2^{e} éd. Ech. 1:500 000. Paris, L. Wuhrer, 1 feuille
- Dewalque, G. (1905). Essai de carte tectonique de la Belgique et des provinces voisines. Annales de la Société géologique de Belgique, 32, M121–M122, accompagné d’une carte hors texte au 1:500.000.
