= Middle Paleolithic =

Archaeological period, part of Stone Age

- Period: Stone Age
- Dates: 300,000 to 50,000 BP
- Preceded by: Lower Paleolithic
- Followed by: Upper Paleolithic

Selected Middle Paleolithic sites from the ROAD database (CC BY-SA 4.0 ROCEEH)

The Middle Paleolithic (or Middle Palaeolithic) is the second subdivision of the Paleolithic or Old Stone Age as it is understood in Europe, Africa and Asia. The term Middle Stone Age is used as an equivalent or a synonym for the Middle Paleolithic in African archeology. The Middle Paleolithic broadly spanned from 300,000 to 50,000 years ago. There are considerable dating differences between regions. The Middle Paleolithic was succeeded by the Upper Paleolithic subdivision which first began between 50,000 and 40,000 years ago. Pettit and White date the Early Middle Paleolithic in Great Britain to about 325,000 to 180,000 years ago (late Marine Isotope Stage 9 to late Marine Isotope Stage 7), and the Late Middle Paleolithic as about 60,000 to 35,000 years ago. The Middle Paleolithic was in the geological Chibanian (Middle Pleistocene) and Late Pleistocene ages.

According to the theory of the recent African origin of modern humans, anatomically modern humans began migrating out of Africa during the Middle Stone Age/Middle Paleolithic around 125,000 years ago and began to replace other Homo species such as the Neanderthals and Homo erectus.

== Origin of behavioral modernity ==
Hominin timeline
← / Earlier apes; ← / Gorilla split; ← / Chimpanzee split; ← / Earliest bipedal; ← / Earliest sign of Ardipithecus; ← / Earliest sign of Australopithecus; ← / Earliest stone tools; ← / Earliest sign of Homo; ← / Dispersal beyond Africa; ← / Earliest fire / cooking; ← / Earliest rock art; ← / Earliest clothes; ← / Modern humans
(million years ago)

The earliest evidence of behavioral modernity first appears during the Middle Paleolithic; undisputed evidence of behavioral modernity, however, only becomes common during the following Upper Paleolithic period.

Middle Paleolithic burials at sites such as Krapina in Croatia (dated to c. 130,000 BP) and the Qafzeh and Es Skhul caves in Israel (c. 100,000 BP) have led some anthropologists and archeologists (such as Philip Lieberman) to believe that Middle Paleolithic cultures may have possessed a developing religious ideology which included concepts such as an afterlife; other scholars suggest the bodies were buried for secular reasons.

According to recent archeological findings from Homo heidelbergensis sites in the Atapuerca Mountains, the practice of intentional burial may have begun much earlier during the late Lower Paleolithic, but this theory is widely questioned in the scientific community. Cut-marks on Neanderthal bones from various sites – such as Combe Grenal and the Moula rock shelter in France – may imply that Neanderthals, like some contemporary human cultures, may have practiced excarnation for presumably religious reasons (see Neanderthal behavior § Cannibalism or ritual defleshing?).

The earliest undisputed evidence of artistic expression during the Paleolithic period comes from Middle Paleolithic/Middle Stone Age sites such as Blombos Cave in the form of bracelets, beads, art rock, ochre used as body paint and perhaps in ritual, though earlier examples of artistic expression such as the Venus of Tan-Tan and the patterns found on elephant bones from Bilzingsleben in Thuringia may have been produced by Acheulean tool-users such as Homo erectus prior to the start of the Middle Paleolithic period. Activities such as catching large fish and hunting large game animals with specialized tools indicate increased group-wide cooperation and more elaborate social organization.

In addition to developing advanced cultural traits, humans also first began to take part in long-distance trade between groups for rare commodities (such as ochre (which was often used for religious purposes such as ritual)) and raw materials during the Middle Paleolithic as early as 120,000 years ago. Inter-group trade may have appeared during the Middle Paleolithic because trade between bands would have helped ensure their survival by allowing them to exchange resources and commodities such as raw materials during times of relative scarcity (i.e., famine or drought).

== Social stratification ==
Evidence from archeology and comparative ethnography indicates that Middle Paleolithic people lived in small, egalitarian band societies similar to those of Upper Paleolithic societies and some modern hunter-gatherers such as the ǃKung and Mbuti peoples. Both Neanderthal and modern human societies took care of the elderly members of their societies during the Middle Paleolithic. Christopher Boehm (1999) has hypothesized that egalitarianism may have arisen in Middle Paleolithic societies because of a need to distribute resources such as food and meat equally to avoid famine and ensure a stable food supply.

It has usually been assumed that women gathered plants and firewood and men hunted and scavenged dead animals through the Paleolithic. However, Steven L. Kuhn and Mary Stiner from the University of Arizona suggest that this sex-based division of labor did not exist prior to the Upper Paleolithic. The sexual division of labor may have evolved after 45,000 years ago to allow humans to acquire food and other resources more efficiently.

== Nutrition ==
Although gathering and hunting comprised most of the food supply during the Middle Paleolithic, people began to supplement their diet with seafood and began smoking and drying meat to preserve and store it. For instance the Middle Stone Age inhabitants of the region now occupied by the Democratic Republic of the Congo hunted large 1.8-metre (6 ft) long catfish with specialized barbed fishing points as early as 90,000 years ago, and Neanderthals and Middle Paleolithic Homo sapiens in Africa began to catch shellfish for food as revealed by shellfish cooking in Neanderthal sites in Italy about 110,000 years ago and Middle Paleolithic Homo sapiens sites at Pinnacle Point, in Africa.

Anthropologists such as Tim D. White suggest that cannibalism was common in human societies prior to the beginning of the Upper Paleolithic, based on the large amount of "butchered human" bones found in Neandertal and other Middle Paleolithic sites. Cannibalism in the Middle Paleolithic may have occurred because of food shortages.

However, it is also possible that Middle Paleolithic cannibalism occurred for religious reasons which would coincide with the development of religious practices thought to have occurred during the Upper Paleolithic. Nonetheless it remains possible that Middle Paleolithic societies never practiced cannibalism and that the damage to recovered human bones was either the result of excarnation or predation by carnivores such as saber-toothed cats, lions and hyenas.

== Technology ==
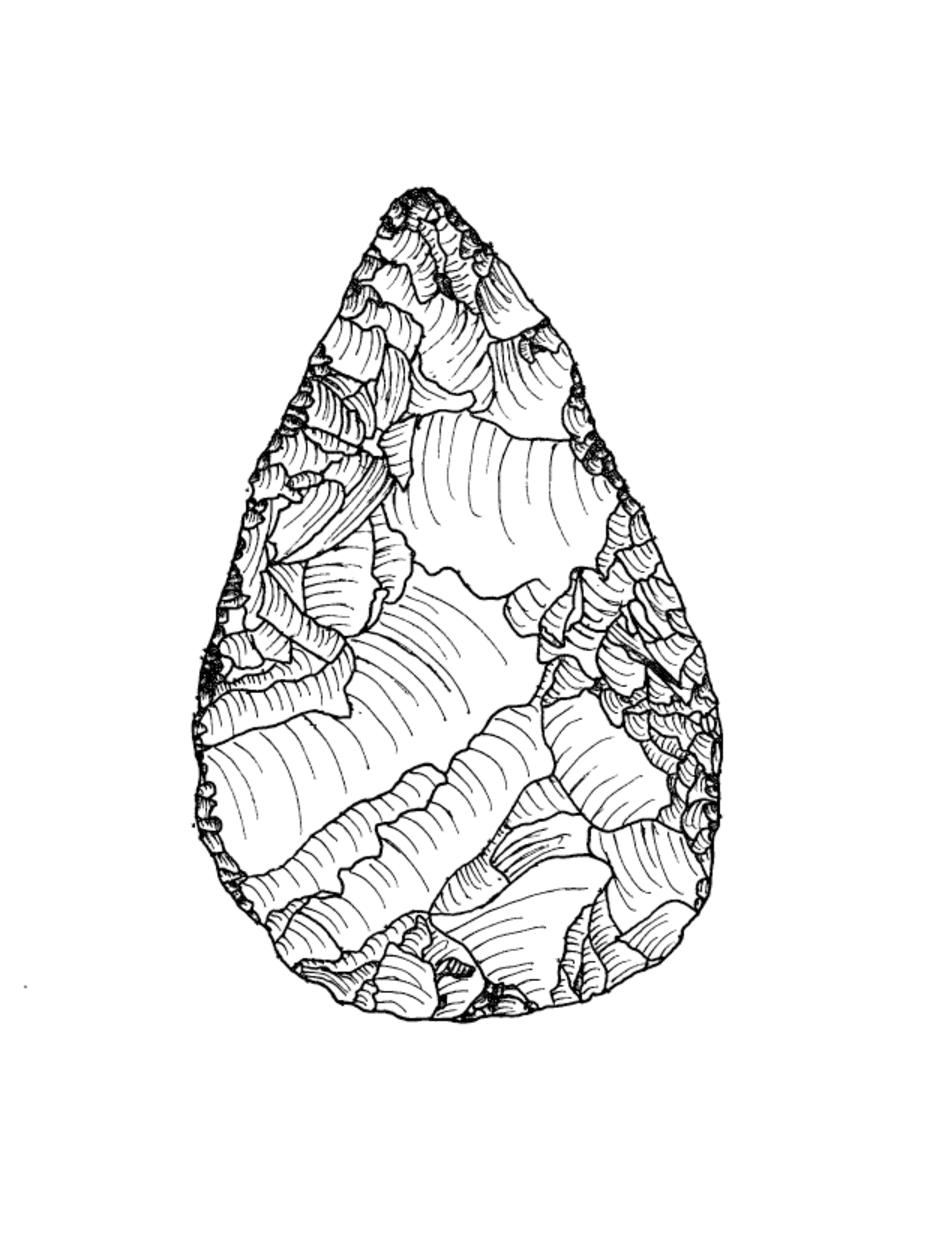
This is a drawing of a replica of an Acheulean hand-axe found during the Lower Paleolithic period. The tool in this drawing is made of black obsidian and is worked on both sides.

Around 200,000 BP Middle Paleolithic Stone tool manufacturing spawned a tool-making technique known as the Levallois technique or prepared-core technique, that was more elaborate than previous Acheulean techniques. Wallace and Shea split the core artifacts into two different types: formal cores and expedient cores. Formal cores are designed to extract the maximum amount from the raw material while expedient cores are based more upon functional need. This method increased efficiency by permitting the creation of more controlled and consistent flakes. This method allowed Middle Paleolithic humans correspondingly to create stone-tipped spears, which were the earliest composite tools, by hafting sharp, pointy stone flakes onto wooden shafts. Paleolithic groups such as the Neanderthals who possessed a Middle Paleolithic level of technology appear to have hunted large game just as well as Upper Paleolithic modern humans and the Neanderthals in particular may have likewise hunted with projectile weapons.

Nonetheless Neanderthal usage of projectile weapons in hunting occurred very rarely (or perhaps never) and the Neanderthals hunted large game animals mostly by ambushing them and attacking them with mêlée weapons such as thrusting spears rather than attacking them from a distance with projectile weapons. An ongoing controversy about the nature of Middle Paleolithic tools is whether there were a series of functionally specific and preconceived tool forms or whether there was a simple continuum of tool morphology that reflect the extent of edge maintenance, as Harold L. Dibble has suggested.

The use of fire became widespread for the first time in human prehistory during the Middle Paleolithic, and humans began to cook their food c. 250,000 years ago. Some scientists have hypothesized that hominids began cooking food to defrost frozen meat which would help ensure their survival in cold regions. Robert K. Wayne, a molecular biologist, has controversially claimed, based on a comparison of canine DNA, that dogs may have been first domesticated during the Middle Paleolithic around or even before 100,000 BCE.

== Sites ==
=== Cave sites ===
==== Western Europe ====
- Axlor, Spain
- Grotte de Spy, Spy, Belgium
- La Cotte de St Brelade, Jersey
- Le Moustier, France—see also Mousterian
- Neandertal (valley), Germany
- Petralona, Greece

==== Middle East and Africa ====
- Aterian, North Africa
- Bisitun Cave, Iran
- Daş Salahlı, Azerbaijan
- Wezmeh, Iran

=== Open-air sites ===
- Biache-Saint-Vaast, France
- Maastricht-Belvédère, The Netherlands
- Veldwezelt-Hezerwater, Belgium

== See also ==
- Early human migrations
- Recent African origin of modern humans
- Timeline of prehistory
