= List of protected heritage sites in Vielsalm =

This table shows an overview of the protected heritage sites in the Walloon town Vielsalm. This list is part of Belgium's national heritage.

Object	Year/architect	Town/section	Address	Coordinates	Number^{?}	Image
Château des Comtes de Salm and environment ^{(nl)} ^{(fr)}		Vielsalm	Rue du Vieux Château, Salmchâteau	50.268261°N 5.904872°E	82032-CLT-0001-01 Info	Château des Comtes de Salm en omgeving
building ^{(nl)} ^{(fr)}		Vielsalm	Burtonville n°33	50.283577°N 5.966257°E	82032-CLT-0002-01 Info	Gebouw
Fange du Grand Passage ^{(nl)} ^{(fr)}		Vielsalm		50.232607°N 5.748364°E	82032-CLT-0003-01 Info	
Coticule quarry situated near "Les Minières" ^{(nl)} ^{(fr)}		Vielsalm		50.247953°N 5.815212°E	82032-CLT-0004-01 Info	
Ensemble of the quarry of Renard ^{(nl)} ^{(fr)}		Vielsalm		50.274339°N 5.923837°E	82032-CLT-0005-01 Info	Ensemble van de groeve van Renard
Agrarian structure (farm) ^{(nl)} ^{(fr)}		Vielsalm	rue Rocher de Hourt n°6	50.318916°N 5.908678°E	82032-CLT-0006-01 Info	
Château Commanster (former "Maison Merget"): facades, roofs and interior left side and the entrance portal ^{(nl)} ^{(fr)}		Vielsalm	n°s 14-15, Beho	50.252493°N 6.000330°E	82032-CLT-0014-01 Info	
Farm Gesnot and the ensemble of the farm and the environment ^{(nl)} ^{(fr)}		Vielsalm	n°18	50.252253°N 5.898262°E	82032-CLT-0015-01 Info	Boerderij Gesnot en het ensemble van de boerderij en de omgeving
Castle farm "Flamang": facades and roofs and the ensemble of the castle and the domain on which it resides. ^{(nl)} ^{(fr)}		Vielsalm	n°25	50.251544°N 5.896556°E	82032-CLT-0017-01 Info	Kasteelhoeve "Flamang": gevels en daken en het ensemble van de kasteelhoeve en het domein waarop het zich bevindt.
House façade, roof cladding and slate of the southern gable ^{(nl)} ^{(fr)}		Vielsalm	rue Général Jacques n°14	50.286505°N 5.916487°E	82032-CLT-0020-01 Info	Huis: straatgevel, dak en bekleding in leisteen van de zuidelijke puntgevel
House façade, roof, gable and northern portico ^{(nl)} ^{(fr)}		Vielsalm	rue G. Jacques n°12	50.286582°N 5.916450°E	82032-CLT-0021-01 Info	Huis: straatgevel, dak, noordelijke puntgevel en portaal
House ^{(nl)} ^{(fr)}		Vielsalm	rue du Général Jacques, n°14 (ancien n°12): façade arrière y compris la tour d'escalier extérieur de la maison.	50.286560°N 5.916321°E	82032-CLT-0022-01 Info	Huis
Cross in Joubiéval on the corner of Route d'Ottré left of n ° 43 ^{(nl)} ^{(fr)}		Vielsalm		50.259180°N 5.848317°E	82032-CLT-0025-01 Info	Kruis te Joubiéval in de hoek van de route d'Ottré, links van n°43
Cross in Fraiture in front of no ° 23 ^{(nl)} ^{(fr)}		Vielsalm		50.258828°N 5.752781°E	82032-CLT-0027-01 Info	Kruis te Fraiture voor n°23
Eastern part of the valley between Glain Vielsalm and Salmchâteau called "la Fosse roulette" ^{(nl)} ^{(fr)}		Vielsalm		50.272252°N 5.907436°E	82032-CLT-0028-01 Info	Oostelijk deel van de vallei van Glain tussen Vielsalm en Salmchâteau, genaamd "la Fosse roulette"
The marsh of Grand Passage ^{(nl)} ^{(fr)}		Vielsalm		50.232607°N 5.748364°E	82032-PEX-0001-01 Info	

== See also ==
- List of protected heritage sites in Luxembourg (Belgium)
- Vielsalm
