= Villeret, Belgium =

Villeret
- Hamlet
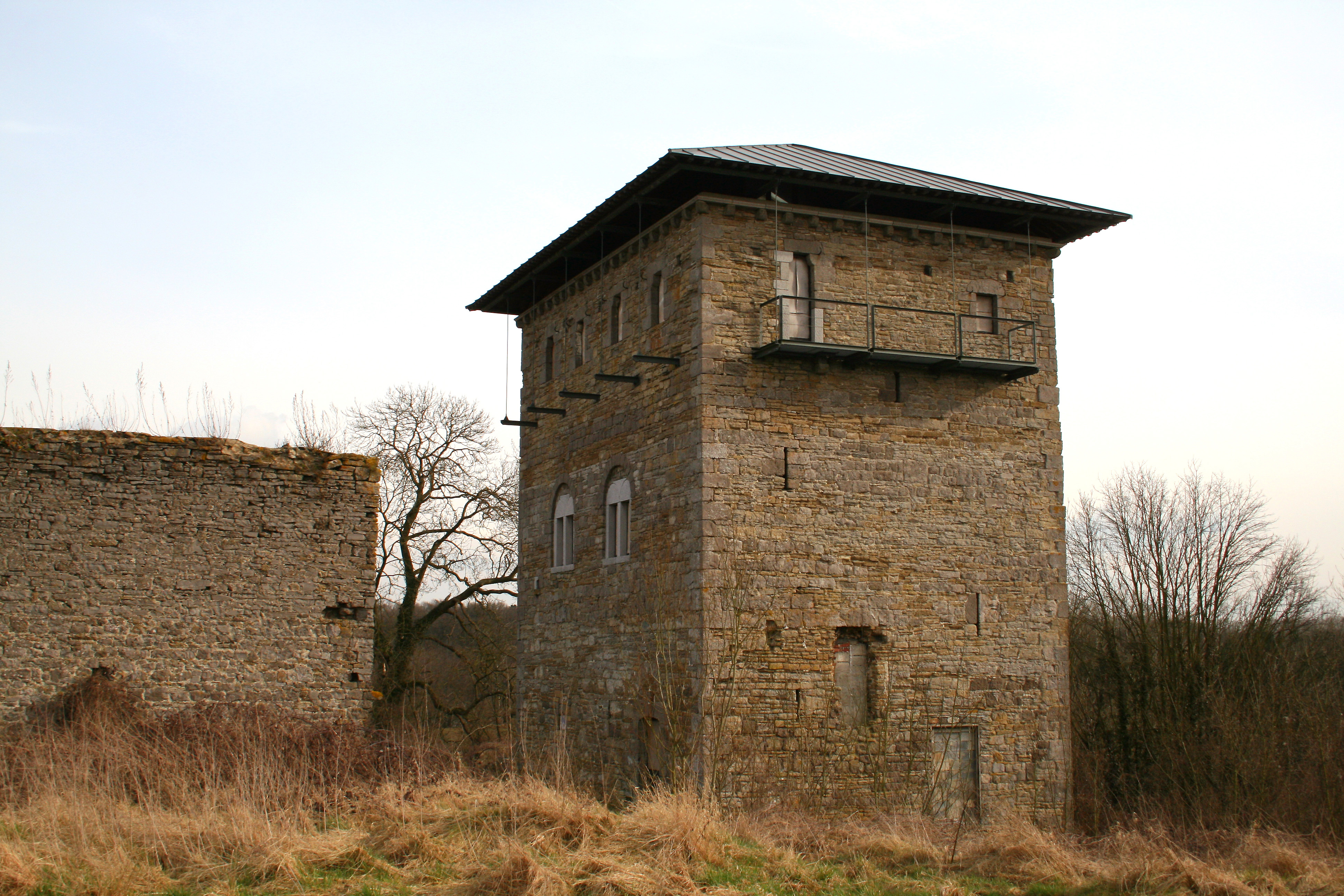
- Le donjon de Villeret (the dungeon of Villeret)

- Location within Belgium
- Coordinates: 50°30′25.39″N 4.°39′11.45″E
- Country: Belgium
- Region: Wallonia
- Province: Namur
- Municipality: Jemeppe-sur-Sambre
- Elevation: 119 m (390 ft)
- Time zone: UTC+1 (CET)

Villeret is a hamlet of Wallonia in the district of Saint-Martin and the municipality of Jemeppe-sur-Sambre, located in the province of Namur), Belgium.

Villeret is located at the confluence of the east flowing Ligny and another stream flowing down from the north (through Bothey). The Ligny then continues eastwards into the Orneau.

== Sights ==
- Le donjon de Villeret (the dungeon of Villeret) is an ancient tower fortified in the thirteenth century.
- La ferme de Basse-Villeret (the Lower Villeret Farm) dates from the sixteenth century. The current buildings are nineteenth century.

== History ==
The hamlet of Villeret was on the extreme-left of the Prussian line during the Battle of Ligny on 16 June 1815. It remained in Prussian possession throughout the battle.
