= Meseta Central =

Plateau in Central Iberia

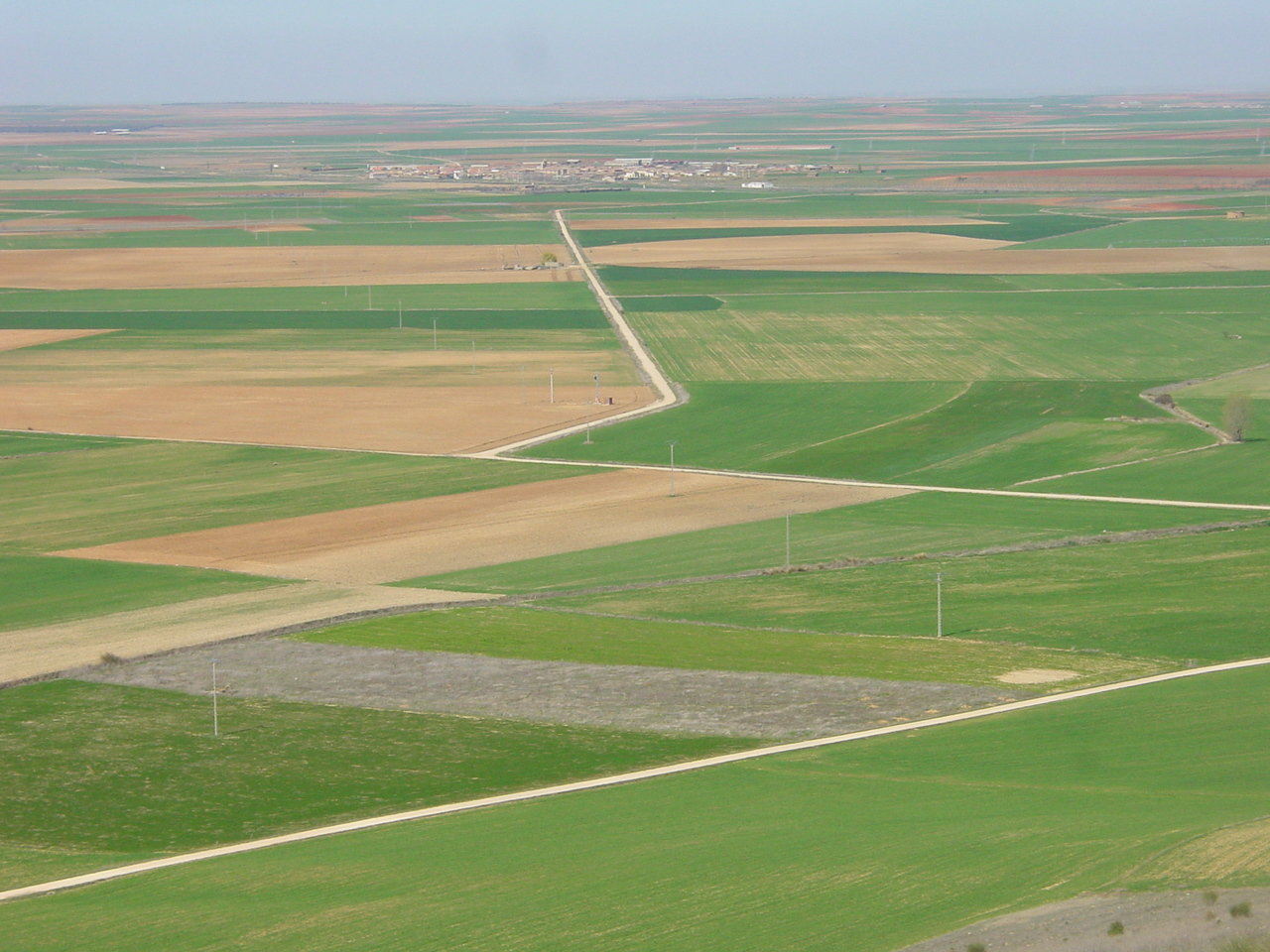
A landscape of the Meseta in May

The Meseta Central (lit. 'central tableland', sometimes referred to in English as Inner Plateau) is one of the basic geographical units of the Iberian Peninsula. It consists of a plateau covering a large part of the latter's interior.

Developed during the 19th century, the concept of meseta central was handled by Heinrich Moritz Willkomm in lower case, and eventually Salvador Calderón y Arana was reportedly the first in using it in upper case, giving it a toponymic nature. The concept was also brought forward by José Macpherson y Hemas, while the writers of the Spanish Generation of '98 greatly contributed to its popularisation among the public sphere.

Topographic map of the Iberian Peninsula, in which the Meseta Central appears labeled by its Spanish name

The Sistema Central mountain range cuts across the Meseta Central, leaving the Submeseta Norte sub-unit (with heights mostly ranging from 700 to 800 m) to the North and the Submeseta Sur (with heights mostly ranging from 600 to 700 m) to the South. Respectively, the former is drained by the Douro while the latter is drained by the Tagus and the Guadiana. The meseta is flanked by relief units such as the Montes de León, the Galician Massif, the Cantabrian Range, the Basque Mountains, the Sistema Ibérico and Sierra Morena.
