= Baraque de Fraiture =

Highest point in Luxembourg province, Belgium

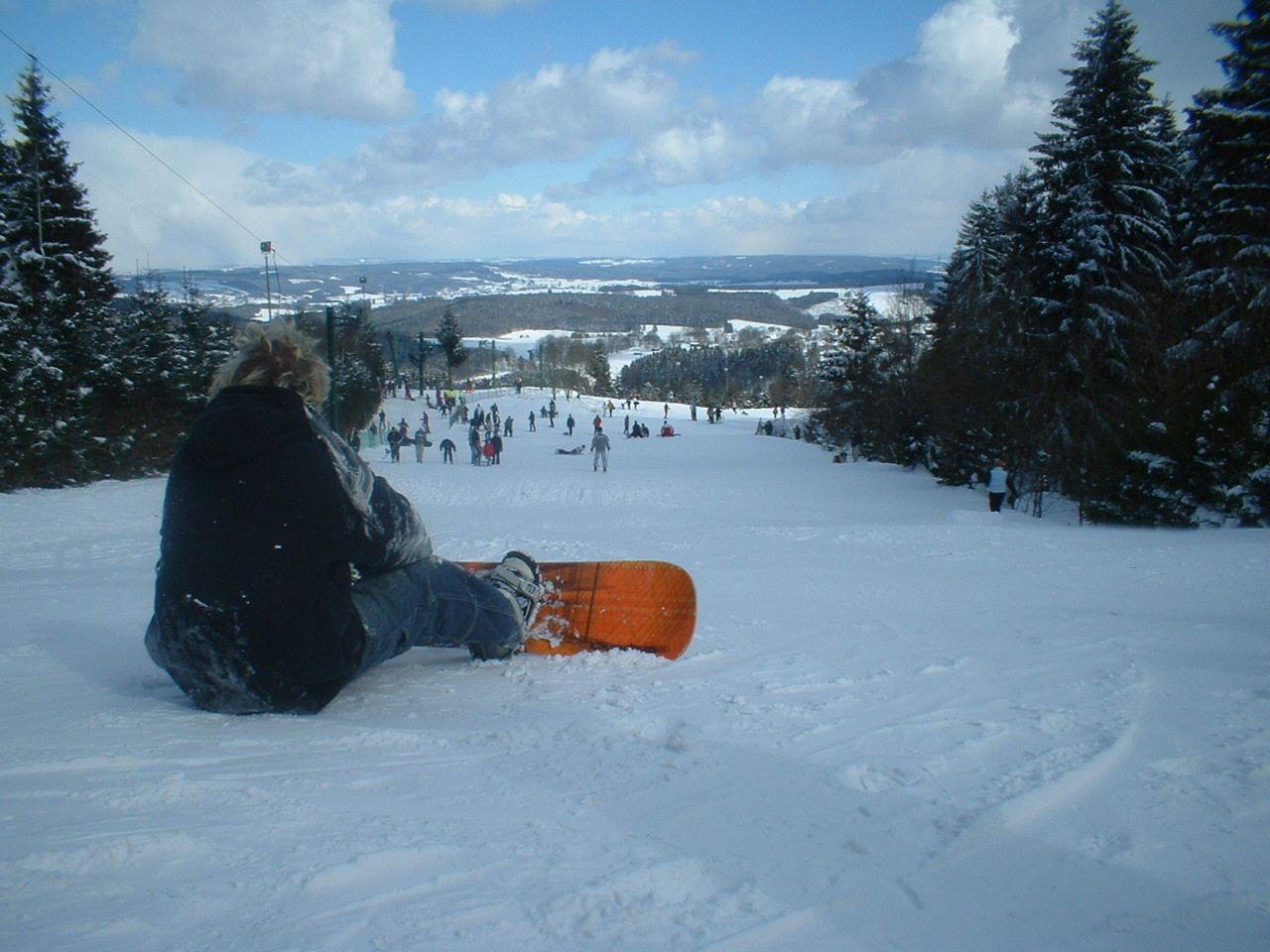
- The ski slope

Highest point
- Elevation: 652 m (2,139 ft)
- Listing: Highest point in Luxembourg, Wallonia, Belgium
- Coordinates: 50°15′04″N 5°43′55″E

Geography
- Location within Belgium
- Country: Belgium
- Region: Wallonia
- Province: Luxembourg
- Parent range: Ardennes

The Baraque de Fraiture is the highest point in the province of Luxembourg, Wallonia, Belgium. Situated in the Municipality of Vielsalm, it is 652 metres (2,139 ft) high. It has a ski area comprising 3 pistes (350, 700 and 1,000 metres long), which normally open for less than 20 days a year. However, it has been open for up to 60 days per year recently.

== Geography ==
La Baraque de Fraiture is on the ridge separating the Basin of the River Ourthe from that of the Amblève on the summit of the Plateau des Tailles consisting of grassland, countryside and forest.

=== Access ===
The Baraque de Fraiture may be reached via the autoroute du Soleil (A26 / E25), exiting at junction 50 and turning onto the N30 (Liège–Bastogne) and N89 (La Roche-en-Ardenne–Salmchâteau).

== History ==
During the Second World War, on 11 May 1940, the day after the outbreak of the Battle of Belgium, the Baraque de Fraiture was taken by Germans of the 5th Panzer Division with the objective of crossing the River Meuse at Dinant.

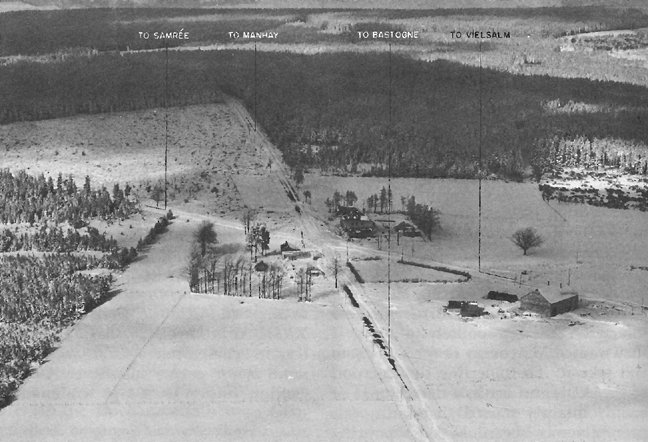
Baraque de Fraiture was a crossroads to key cities during the Battle of the Bulge.

On 19 December 1944, Major Arthur C. Parker III led the 589th Field Artillery Battalion (106th Infantry Division), with their three 105 mm howitzers, to establish a roadblock and would soon be reinforced with units of the 7th Armored Division, namely the 203rd Anti-Aircraft Artillery Battalion with their quadruple mounted M2 Browning M16 Multiple Gun Motor Carriages and D Troop, 87th Cavalry Squadron. General James M. Gavin of the 82nd Airborne had ordered for Parker to hold the crossroads at all costs. Before dawn on 21 December, an 80-strong patrol from the 560th Volksgrenadier Division engaged the roadblock but was driven off by the M16 MGMC's M2 Brownings. The Allied forces captured an officer from the 2nd SS Panzer Division Das Reich, alerting Parker of the imminent attack by said division. On 22 December, the Allied roadblock received 2nd Battalion, 325th Glider Infantry Regiment and 11 tanks with a reconnaissance platoon from Task Force Kane. 3rd Armored Division's 643rd Tank Destroyer Battalion had also been sent to the crossroads but had gotten lost and instead settled some distance north of Baraque de Fraiture. The assault by the Germans had been delayed due to fuel issues, so they continued shelling and probed the crossroads. On 23 December, the defenses of the crossroads continued to soften up as the Germans used captured American radios to jam on the wave band on which American forward artillery observers directed artillery fire. Then in the afternoon and evening of that day, after 20 minutes of German artillery fire, two panzer companies and the entire strength of the 4th Panzer Grenadier Regiment engaged the U.S. troops. The commander of F Company, 325th Glider Infantry Regiment requested to Charles Billingslea to withdraw, but General Gavin returned the order to "hold at all costs". Eventually the Allied forces at the crossroads withdrew which opened up a vulnerability between the lines of the 3rd Armored and 82nd Airborne Divisions. An attack on the crossroads of Manhay would soon follow.

== In popular culture ==
In December 2005, Dutch playwright Ivan Vrambout put on a play entitled Baraque Frituur which featured the mutual prejudices of Flemish and Walloons. The title of the piece was inspired by the way in which this author, like many Belgian children, used the words Baraque Fraiture when he was a child when referring to a baraque à frites, saying baraque friture (a friterie or chip kiosk) instead of fraiture (frituur has the same meaning in Dutch and French in this case). These friteries were usually mobile kiosks where traditional Belgian fries were sold in Belgium.
