= Bothey =

Bothey Bôtè (Walloon)
- Village
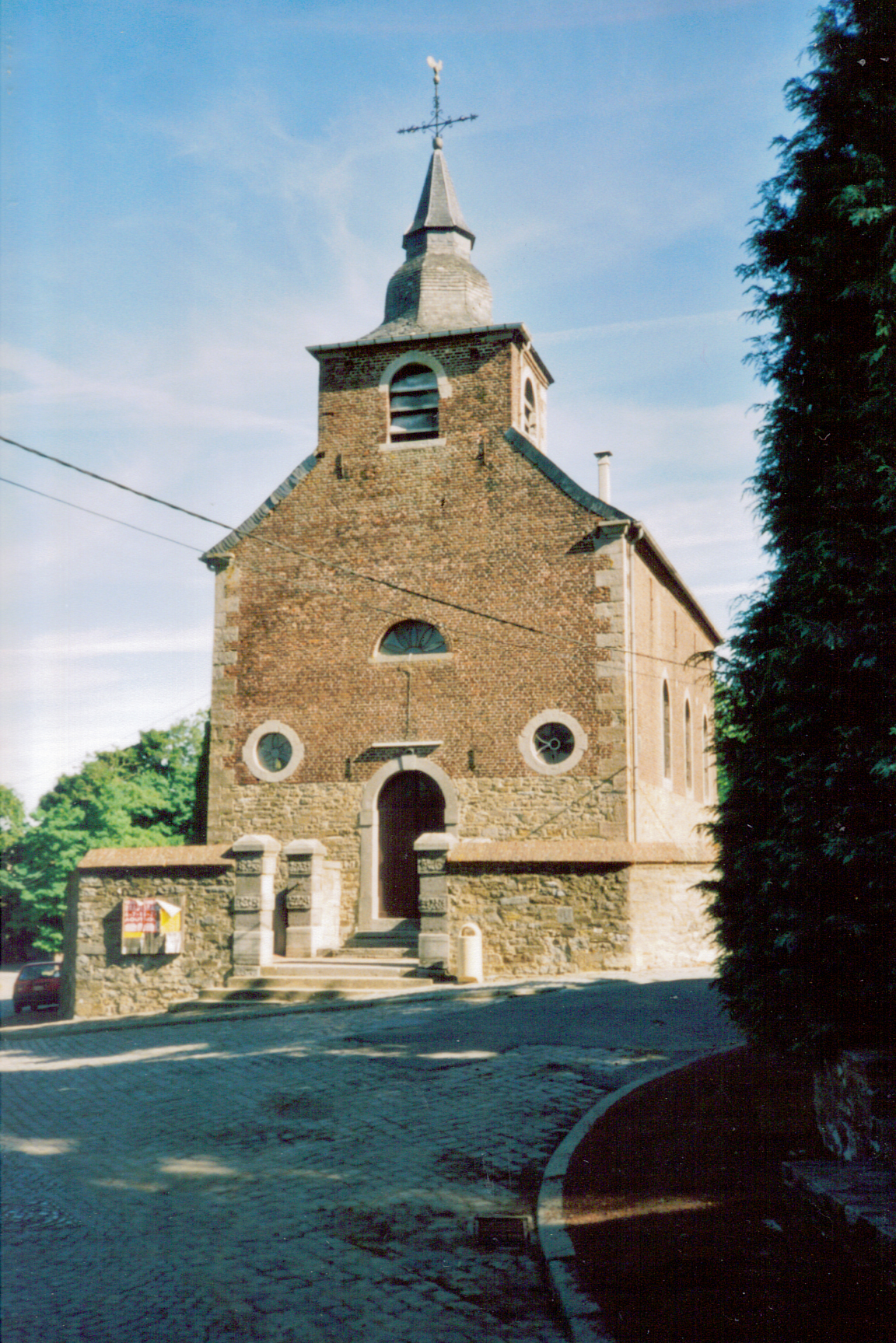
- Church in Bothey

- Location within Belgium
- Coordinates: 50°31′18.4″N 4°39′9.8″E
- Country: Belgium
- Region: Wallonia
- Province: Namur
- Municipality: Gembloux
- Elevation: 158 m (518 ft)
- Time zone: UTC+1 (CET)

Bothey (French pronunciation: [bɔtɛ]; Walloon: Bôtè) is a village of Wallonia and a district of the municipality of Gembloux, located in the province of Namur, Belgian.

Bothey was its own municipality until the fusion of the Belgian municipalities in 1977 when it merged with Gembloux.

== History ==
Along with the hamlet of Villeret, the village of Bothey and a stream that connected them, were on the extreme left wing of the Prussian army at the Battle of Ligny on 16 June 1815. Bothey remained in Prussian hands throughout the battle.
