= Onoz, Namur =

Village in Namur Province, Wallonia, Belgium

Onoz Ôno (Walloon)
- Village
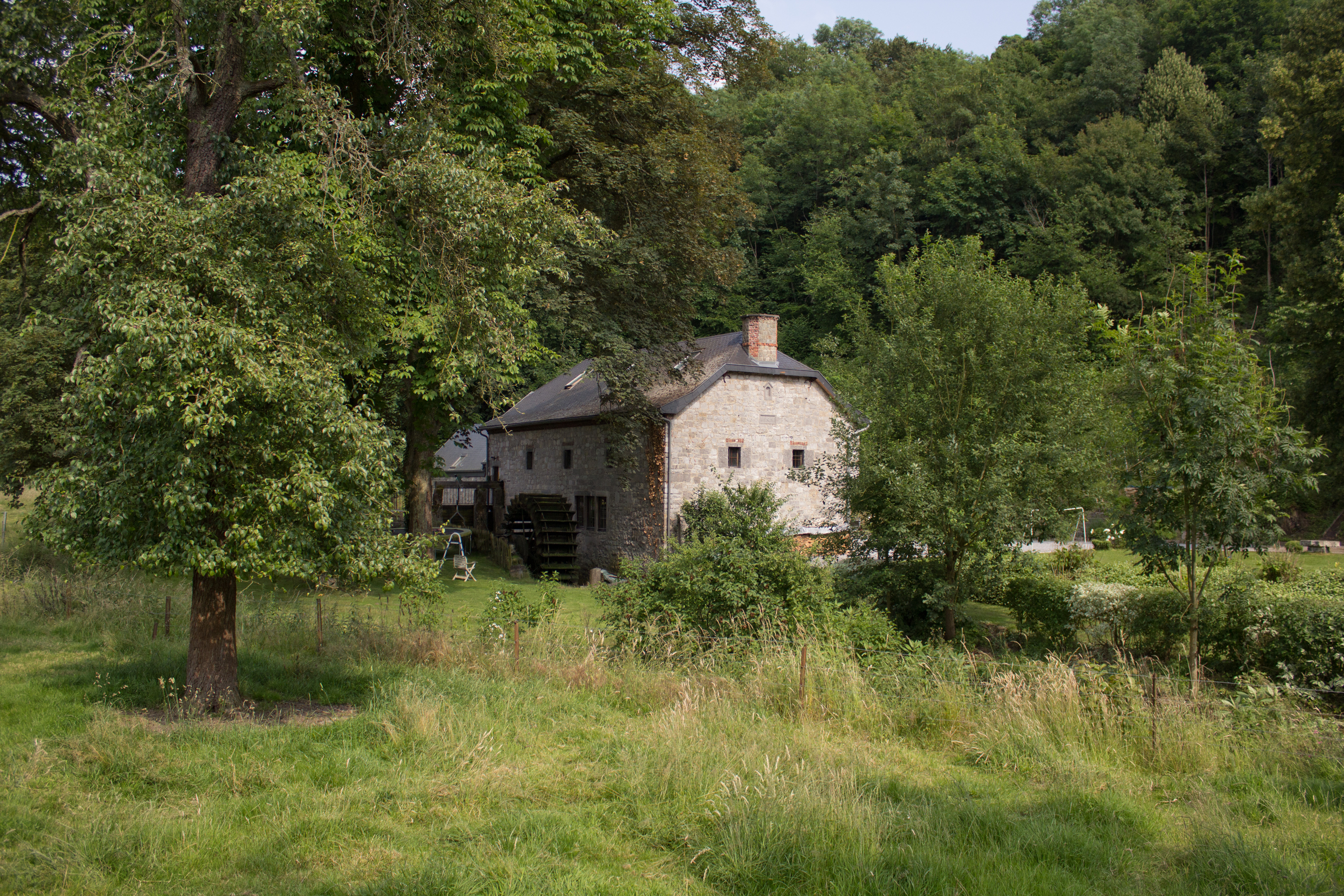
- Watermill in Onoz

- Location within Belgium
- Coordinates: 50°29′32.87″N 4°40′13.33″E
- Country: Belgium
- Region: Wallonia
- Province: Namur
- Municipality: Jemeppe-sur-Sambre
- Elevation: 106 m (348 ft)
- Time zone: UTC+1 (CET)

Onoz (Walloon: Ôno) is a village of Wallonia and a district of the municipality of Jemeppe-sur-Sambre, located in the province of Namur, Belgium.

It is located on the west bank of the river Orneau

Château de Mielmont, built in the 12th century and modified through to the 19th century, is located within Onoz, at 50°29′52.04″N 4°40′20.62″E.
