= Gustav Adolph Kenngott =

German mineralogist (1818–1897)

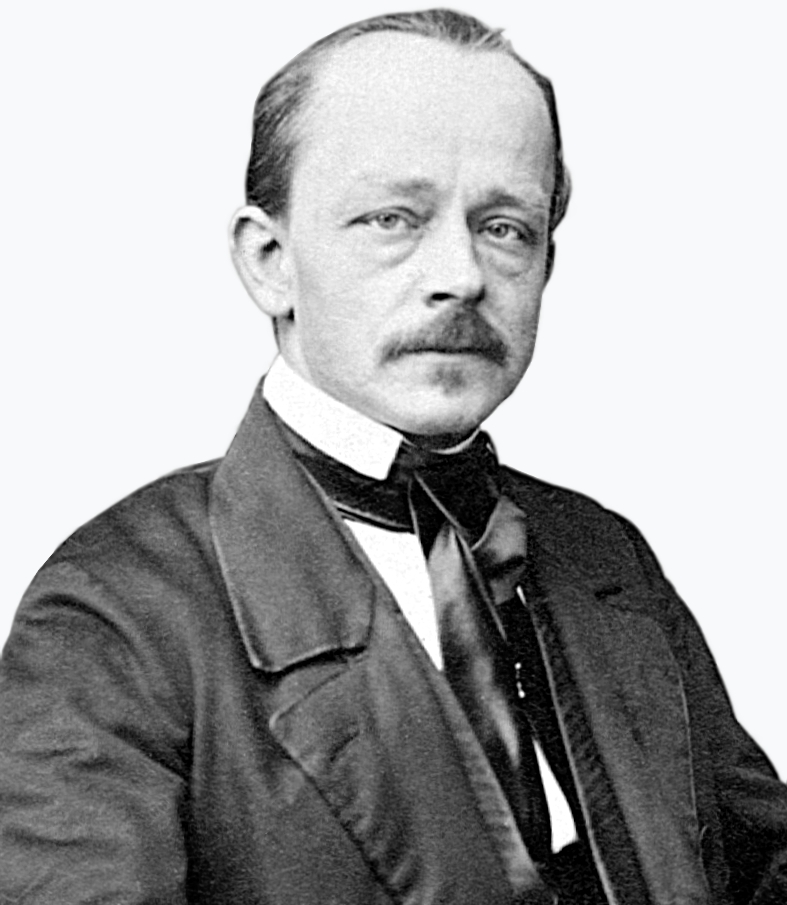
Gustav Adolph Kenngott, c. 1860

Gustav Adolph Kenngott (January 6, 1818 – March 7, 1897) was a German mineralogist.

== Biography ==
Kenngott was born in Breslau. After being employed in the Hofmineralien-Cabinett at Vienna. From 1857 to 1893, he was also full professor of mineralogy at the ETH Zurich and at the University of Zürich. He was distinguished for his researches on mineralogy, crystallography and petrology. In 1855, from the serpentine of Mount Zdjar near Schönberg in Moravia, Kenngott was the first to describe enstatite. In 1860, he identified a new mineral, giving it the name pisanite in honor of Felice Pisani. Kenngott died in Lugano.

== Publications ==
- Lehrbuch der reinen Krystallographie (1846) – Textbook of pure crystallography.
- Lehrbuch der Mineralogie (1852 and 1857; 5th ed., 1880) – Textbook of mineralogy.
- Übersicht der Resultate mineralogischer Forschungen in den Jahren 1844-1865 (7 vols., 1852-1868) – Overview of the results of mineralogical research in the years 1844–65.
- Die Minerale der Schweiz (1866) – The minerals of Switzerland.
- Elemente der Petrographie (1868) – Elements of petrography.
