= Julien Fraipont =

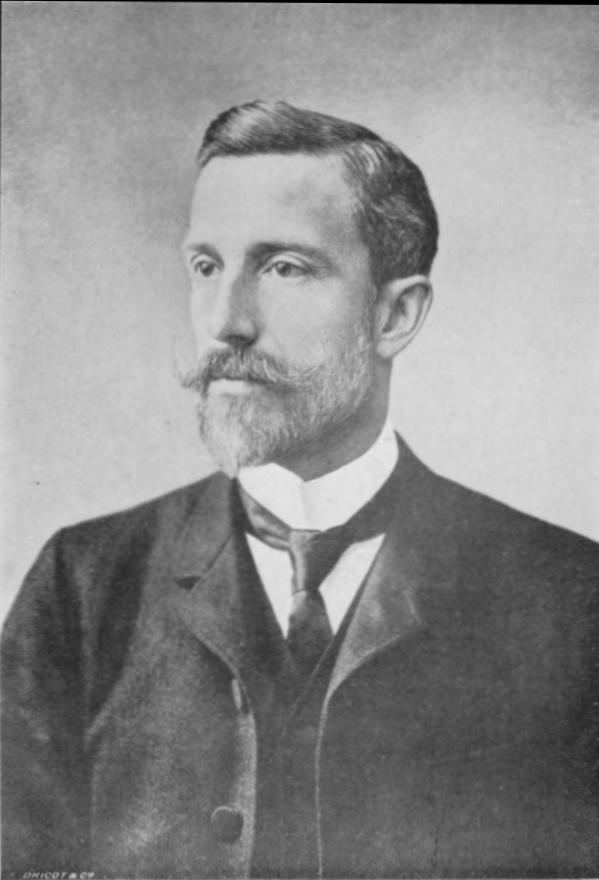

Julien Jean Joseph Fraipont (17 August 1857 – 22 March 1910) was a Belgian paleontologist who worked as a professor of zoology at the University of Liège and is best known for his descriptive work on Neanderthal man. His son Charles Fraipont also became a paleontologist.

Fraipont was born in Liege where his father directed a bank. He went to study humanities at the University of Liege so as to be able to work at his father's bank but shifted to the natural sciences after listening to the zoology lectures of Edouard Van Beneden. In 1881 he became an assistant to Van Beneden and began to lecture in paleontology from 1884, taking the position of Gustave Dewalque. In 1886 he became a professor and served as a rector in 1909. His major work was in the anatomical examination of the Neanderthal fossils found along with Max Lohest and others in Spy cave in 1886. He also worked on the systematics of the protozoa, hydrozoa, cestodes and the Archiannelida. He also wrote a monograph on the genus Okapia which was discovered in the then Belgian Congo.
