= José Macpherson =

José Macpherson y Hemas (1839–1902) was a Spanish geologist, noted as pioneer in the introduction of modern techniques for the studies of rocks in Spain.

== Biograph ==
José Macpherson
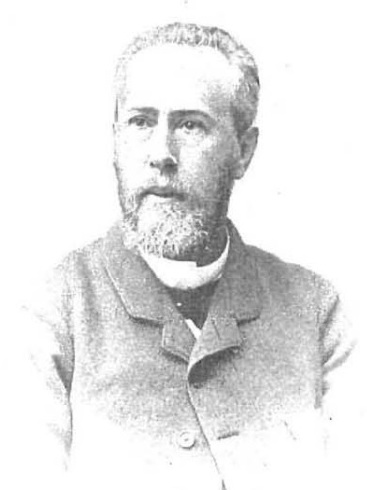
- Born: 15 July 1839; Cádiz
- Died: 11 October 1902 (aged 63); Real Sitio de San Ildefonso
- Occupation: Geologist

José Macpherson Hemas was born in Cádiz in 1839. His father, Donald Macpherson Grant, was a merchant of Scottish origin, and his mother, Josefa Hemas Martí, was a native of Cádiz. He was the younger brother of Guillermo Macpherson, a diplomat, archaeologist and translator.

The family, engaged in commercial activities, enjoyed a solid economic standing, which meant that José Macpherson did not need to seek paid employment. Deeply interested in geology, he devoted his entire life to the study of this discipline, although he did not follow a formal academic curriculum, as he had no need to pursue an official position. He traveled to France, England, and Austria to study under prominent scientists such as Auguste Daubrée, Félix Pisani, and Stanislas Meunier.

Francisco Giner de los Ríos (the founder of the Institución Libre de Enseñanza, ILE) a progressive law professor, was exiled to Cádiz, where he became acquainted with José Macpherson. Upon his return to Madrid, Giner de los Ríos founded the Institución Libre de Enseñanza (Free Institution of Education), together with other professors who had been dismissed or persecuted by the government. In 1882, the Academic Council of the Institution appointed José Macpherson as a professor.

Macpherson moved to Madrid in 1875, and in 1884 took up residence in a chalet near the Institution, constructed according to his specifications. There he housed his geological library, his mineralogical and petrological collections, and his own petrography laboratory, which was equipped with more advanced instruments than those available at the Institution or the university. He also maintained a photographic laboratory. His first petrographic study, published in 1875, elucidated the origin of the rocks of the Serranía de Ronda. This work, demonstrating the inorganic origin of serpentine, contributed to discrediting the existence of the so-called Eozoon canadense as a fossil, which also appeared in serpentines. Recognizing the significance of this work, he published an English version at his own expense.

The availability of specialized equipment enabled him to introduce in Spain the petrographic research technique based on thin sections, which he was able to prepare himself. This allowed him to study ophites, a type of rock widely distributed in the Triassic formations of the Iberian Peninsula. In 1878, during his geological research work in the Sierra Morena, in the municipality of Cazalla de la Sierra (Seville), Macpherson found a fossil unlike any known in Europe. He sent it to Professor Roemer, who determined that it was a new species of archaeocyath, which he named Archaeocyathus marinaius (from Marianus, the Roman name for Sierra Morena). This type of fossil had not yet been found in Europe.

He was member of the Sóciéte Géologique de France, Sociedad Española de Historia Natural and a founding member of the Sociedad Geográfica de Madrid. and published numerous articles in their journals. He also self-published several books, in both Spanish and English versions.

Macpherson died on 11 October 1902 in La Granja.Upon his death in 1902, he bequeathed all his geological materials, books, instruments, and collections, as well as funds for the construction of a building to house them, to Giner de los Ríos, so that they could be transferred to the Institución Libre de Enseñanza. In 1905, this new laboratory began to be used for both teaching and research. When Francoist troops occupied Madrid in 1939, the laboratory—like the rest of the facilities of the Institución Libre de Enseñanza—was looted, and its materials were destroyed or stolen. Only one Zeiss microscope was preserved: the one José Macpherson habitually used in his work, which had been loaned to a former student. He retained it until 1978, when the Institution was once again legalized, at which point he was able to return it.

== Main publications ==
- 1870. Método para determinar minerales, Sevilla, Imprenta de Jirones y Orduña. 171 pp
- 1872. Bosquejo Geológico de la Provincia de Cádiz, Cádiz. Revista Médica, Cádiz. 156 pp.
- 1873. Geological sketch of the province of Cádiz, Cádiz, Printed by Federico Joly, Imprenta de la Revista Médica. 156 pp.
- 1874. Sobre la estructura de la Serranía de Ronda. Revista Médica, Cádiz. 91 pp.
- 1875. Breves apuntes acerca del origen peridotítico de la serpentina de la serranía de Ronda. Anales de la Sociedad Española de Historia Natural, 4, 5–18
- 1876. Sobre las rocas eruptivas de la provincia de Cádiz y su semejanza con las ofitas del Pirineo. Anales de la Sociedad Española de Historia Natural, 5, 5–26
- 1876. On the origin of the serpentine of the Ronda mountains. T. Fortanet, Madrid. 20 pp
- 1877. Sobre ciertas anomalías que las micas de algunos granitos presentan en la luz polarizada. Anales de la Sociedad Española de Historia Natural, 6,11-14
- 1878. Sobre la existencia de la fauna primordial en la provincia de Sevilla, Anales de la Sociedad Española de Historia Natural, 7, 281–28
- 1878. Fenómenos dinámicos que han contribuido al relieve de la serranía de Ronda. Anales de la Sociedad Española de Historia Natural, 7, 491–503
- 1879. Breve noticia acerca de la especial estructura de la Península Ibérica Anales de la Sociedad Española de Historia Natural, 8, 5–26
- 1879. Descripción de algunas rocas que se encuentran en la Serranía de Ronda. Anales de la Sociedad Española de Historia Natural, 8, 229–264.
- 1879. Estudio geológico y petrográfico del norte de la provincia de Sevilla. Boletín de la Comisión del Mapa Geológico de España, 4, 97-268.
- 1880. De las relaciones entre las rocas graníticas y porfídicas. Anales de la Sociedad Española de Historia Natural, 9, 135–16
- 1880. Predominio de la estructura uniclinal de la Península Ibérica. Anales de la Sociedad Española de Historia Natural, 9, 465–494
- 1883- 1884. Sucesión estratigráfica de los terrenos arcaicos de España. Anales de la Sociedad Española de Historia Natural, 12, 341–378, and 13, 365–418.
- 1886. Descripción petrográfica de los materiales arcaicos de Galicia, Anales de la Sociedad Española de Historia Natural 15, 165–203.
- 1887. Descripción petrográfica de los materiales arcaicos de Andalucía Anales de la Sociedad Española de Historia Natural, 16, 223–272.
- 1901. Ensayo de historia evolutiva de la Península Ibérica. Anales de la Sociedad Española de Historia Natural, 30, 23–165.
- 1900. Manual de Geología. Manuales Soler, Barcelona, 187 pp. Several subsequent editions followed bySucesores de Manuel Soler, Manuales Gallach, Calpe S.A
