= Max Lohest =

Belgian paleontologist and geologist (1857–1926)

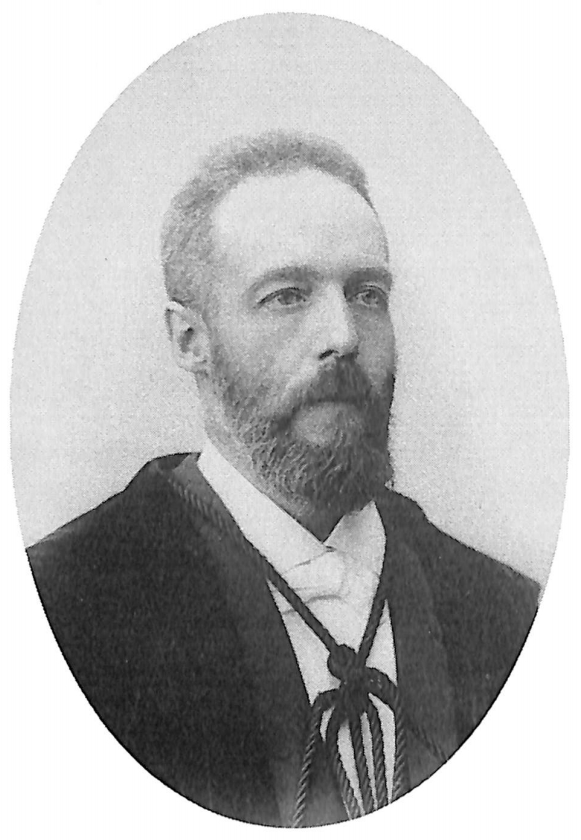
- Max Lohest in 1899
- Born: Marie Joseph Maximin Lohest; September 8, 1857; Liège, Belgium
- Died: December 6, 1926 (aged 69); Liège, Belgium
- Education: University of Liège
- Known for: Discovery of Spy Cave Neanderthals; Coining the term "Boudinage"; Research on Belgian Carboniferous stratigraphy
- Awards: Decennial Prize for Mineralogical Science (1908)
- Scientific career
- Fields: Geology; Paleontology; Stratigraphy
- Workplaces: University of Liège

Marie Joseph Maximin Lohest (8 September 1857 – 6 December 1926) was a Belgian paleontologist and geologist. He served as an influential professor at the University of Liège and was involved in the discovery of Neanderthal remains in Spy Cave in 1886.

Lohest was born in Liège to businessman Joseph Lohest and was educated at the Jesuit College where Father van Trient sparked an interest in the natural sciences. He then went to the School of Mines at the University of Liège. He received a diploma in 1883 and assisted Gustave Dewalque in teaching geology. In In 1897 he replaced Dewalque as professor of general geology. He collaborated with Julien Fraipont who handled paleontology and Marcel de Puydt. He helped establish the School of Anthropology between 1914 and 1918. Lohest examined fossils, studied mineralogy, stratigraphy and geography in Belgium and even worked on maps of the Congo although he never visited.

Lohest was a member of several organizations including the Académie Royale des Sciences de Belgique, the Geological Society of London and served as a director of the Belgian Geological Commission.
