= Balâtre, Belgium =

Balâtre Balåsse (Walloon)
- Village
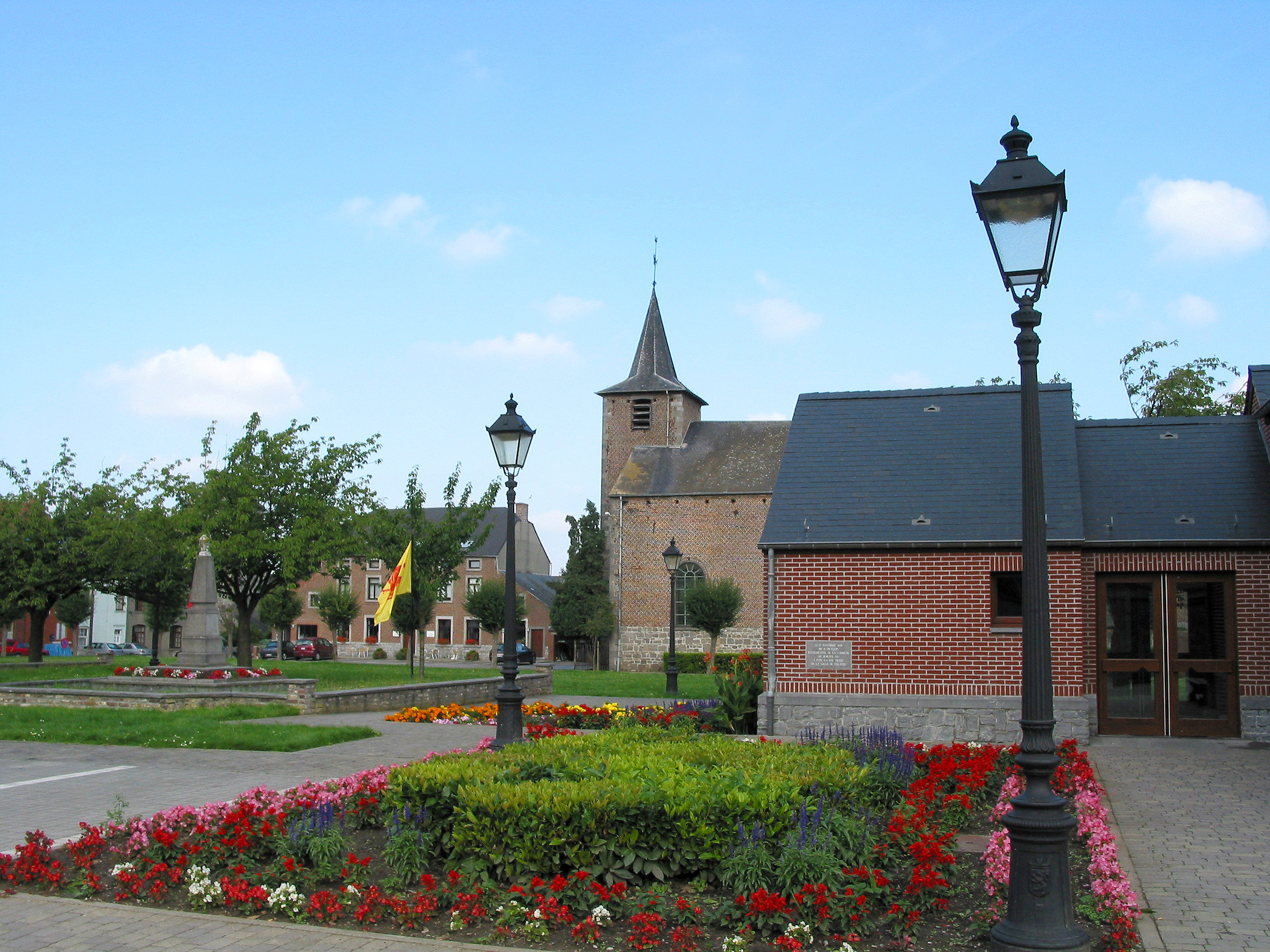
- The church on Place de Balâtre

- Location within Belgium
- Coordinates: 50°29′54.7″N 4°38′16.52″E
- Country: Belgium
- Region: Wallonia
- Province: Namur
- Municipality: Jemeppe-sur-Sambre
- Elevation: 139 m (456 ft)
- Time zone: UTC+1 (CET)

Balâtre (French pronunciation: [balatʁ]; Walloon: Balåsse) is a village of Wallonia and a district of the municipality of Jemeppe-sur-Sambre, located in the province of Namur, Belgium.

Balâtre was its own municipality until the fusion of the Belgian municipalities in 1977 when it merged with Jemeppe-sur-Sambre. Balâtre is on the northern bank of the river Ligny.

== History ==
Balâtre Castle, in the centre of the village, dates from the early 13th century. The village of Balâtre was a location defended by the Prussian army throughout the Battle of Ligny on 16 June 1815.

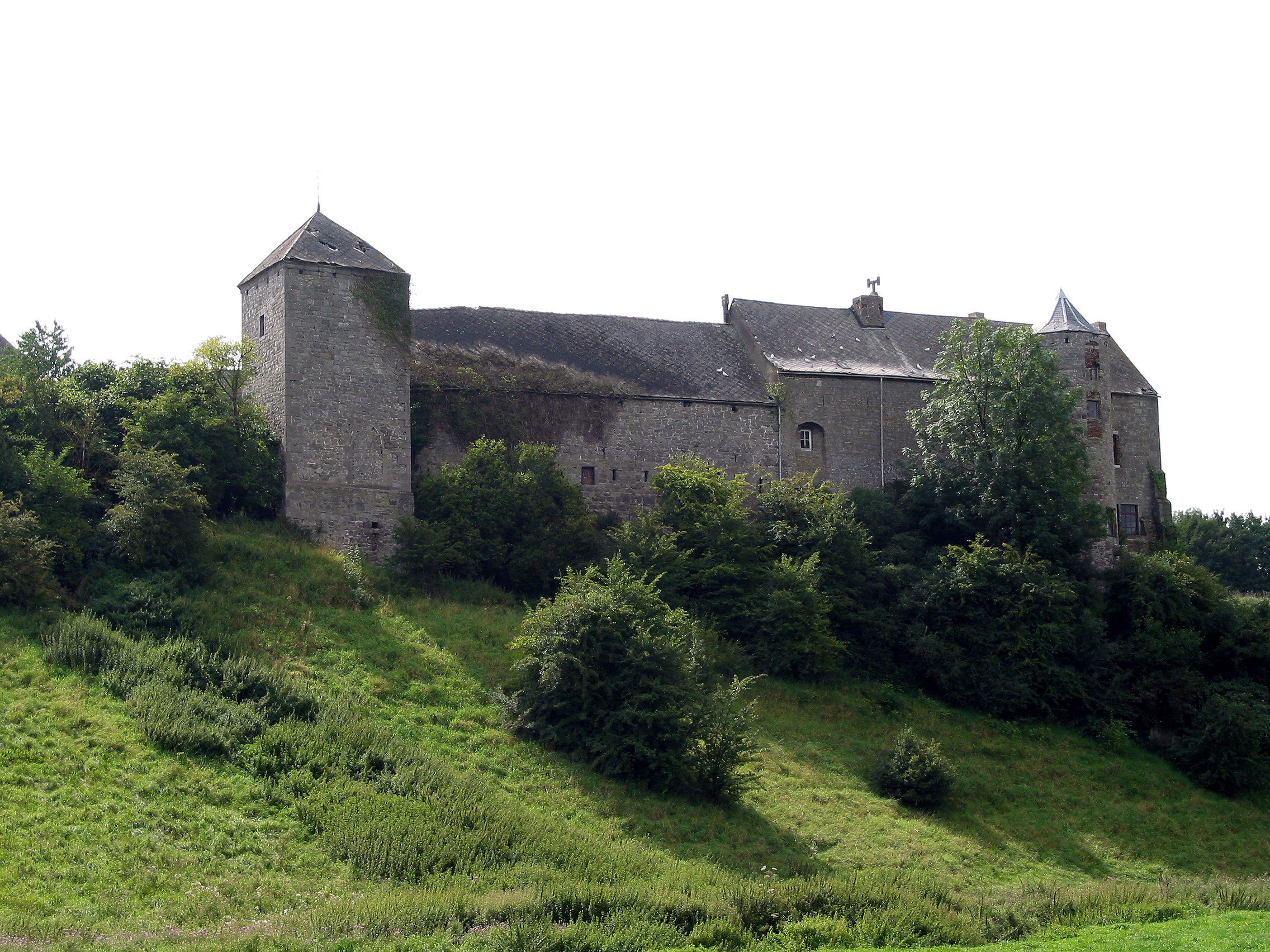
Balâtre Castle
