= Orneau =

Orneau Ôrnô
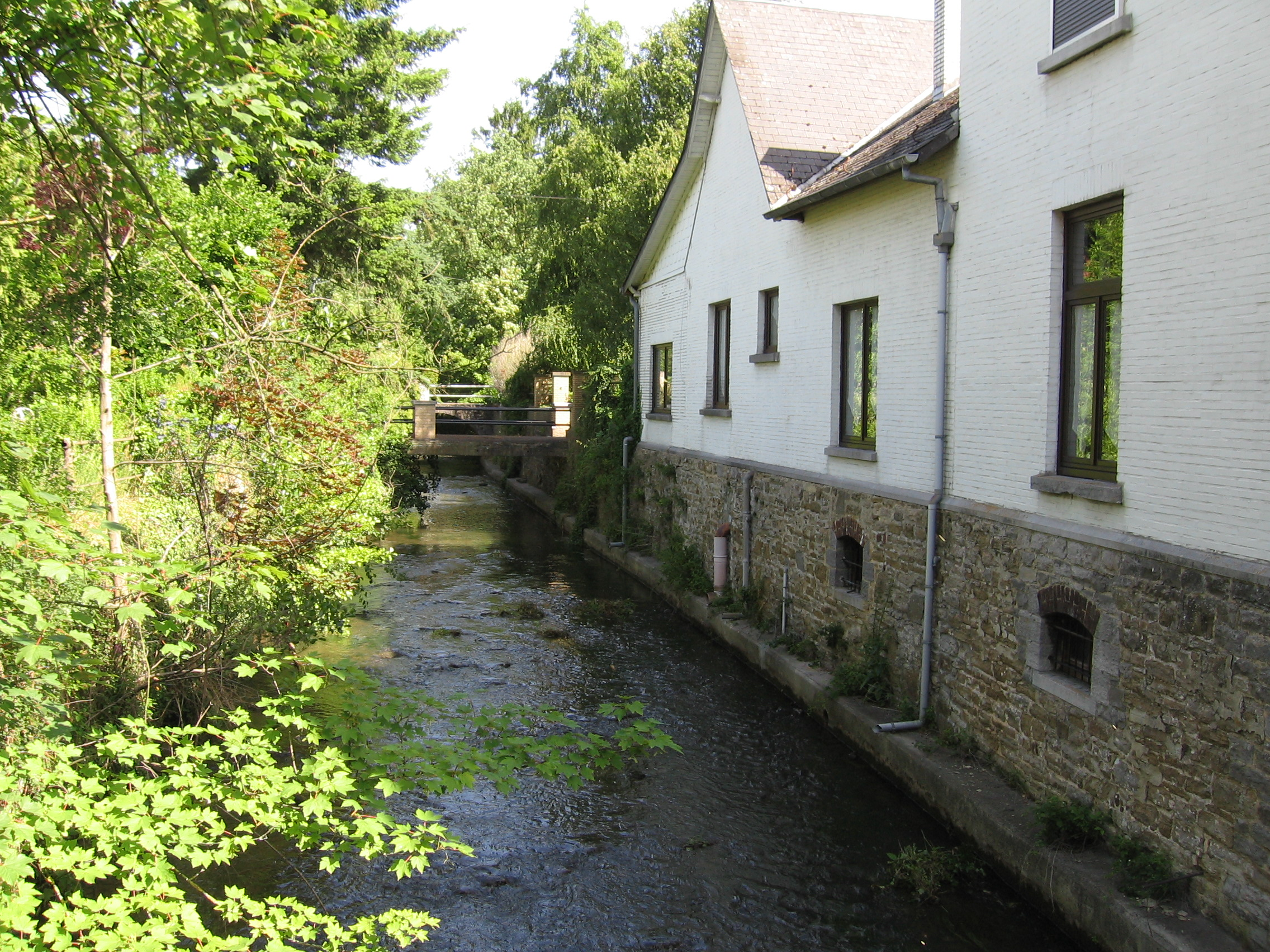
- The Orneau flowing through Mazy

Location
- Country: Belgium

Physical characteristics
- Source
  - location: près de Meux
- Mouth
  - location: Jemeppe-sur-Sambre
  - coordinates: 50°26′58″N 4°40′45″E

Basin features
- Progression: Sambre
- River system: Meuse

The Orneau (French pronunciation: [ɔʁno]; Walloon: Ôrnô) is a river in Belgium. It is a tributary of the Sambre and therefore sub-tributary of the Meuse.

The Orneau flows from north to south, through the province of Namur, and after a journey of about 25 kilometres (16 mi), it flows into the Sambre at Jemeppe-sur-Sambre.

The river is known for its valley, panoramic views and nearby charming villages. Several walkable trails exist near the river.

== Fishing ==
The Orenau is a public river, freely accessible to fishers with a valid Belgian fishing permit. However, night fishing is restricted at the river, with both day-only and night-permitted stretches.

Available species at the Orneau include carp, roach, pike, chub, perch, trout, bream, and barbel.
