= Balâtre Castle =

Coordinates: 50°29′55″N 04°38′12″E

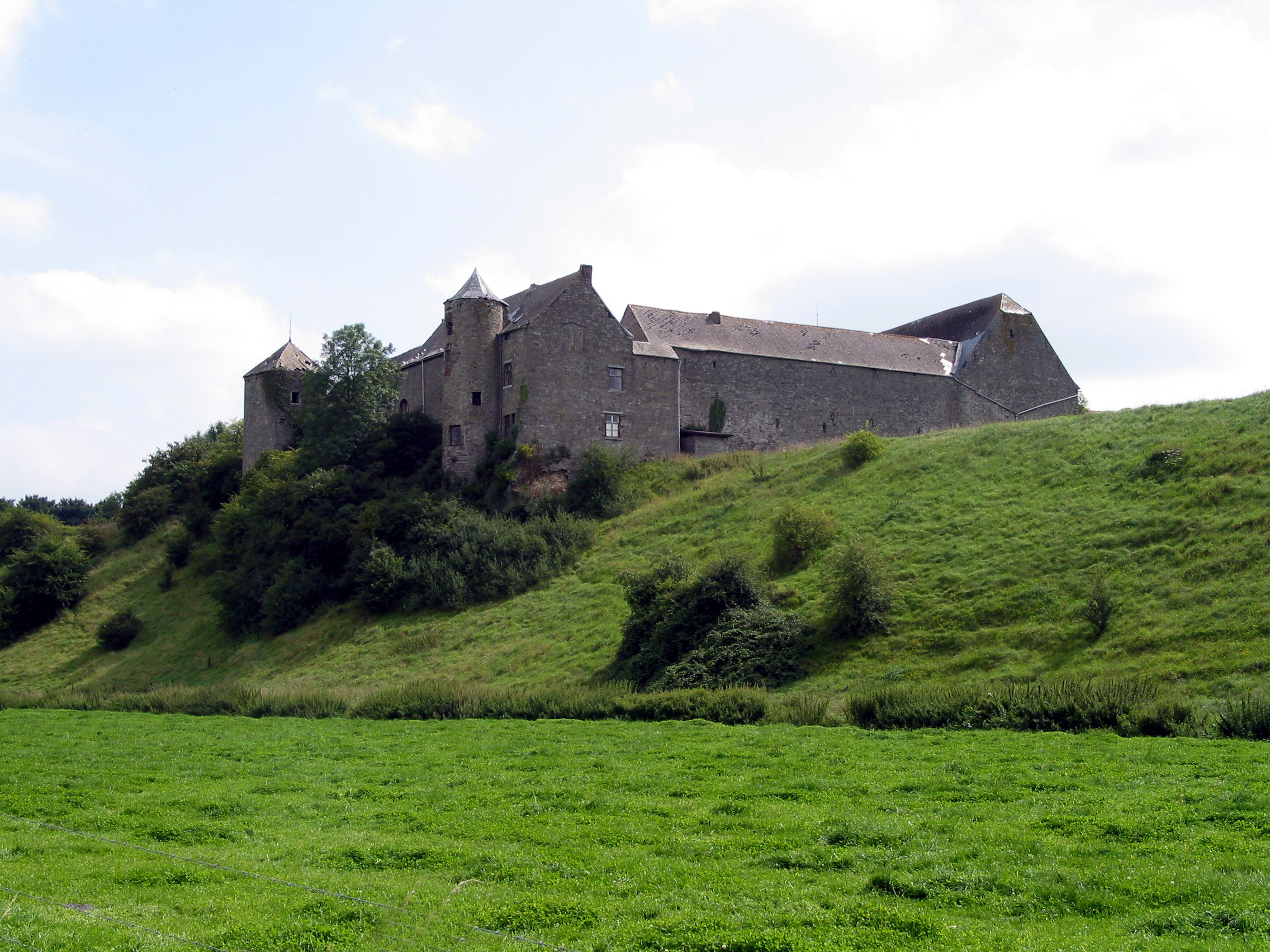
Balâtre Castle

Balâtre Castle (French: Château-ferme de Balâtre) is a castle or fortified estate (château-ferme) in the village of Balâtre, in the Belgian municipality of Jemeppe-sur-Sambre.

== History ==
The castle was a fief established in the early 13th century. It was a feudal property until the French Revolution and the subsequent occupation of present-day Belgium during the War of the First Coalition. It has belonged to several aristocratic families, including the de Seilles family, del Juverie family, t'Serclaes family, de Tilly family, and de Ponti family.

The building originated as a fortified keep, but was probably already during the Middle Ages expanded with a residential wing. It was further substantially enlarged during the 16th century, and in the 17th century an additional tower was added. Since June 2026, the castle belongs to a local cooperative that aims to restore it and use it for events and exhibitions.

== Description ==
The castle is located on a hill overlooking a small valley with a brook. One of the corner towers face the village square of Balâtre.
