= Spy Cave =

Archaeological site in Belgium

- Grotte de Spy (French)
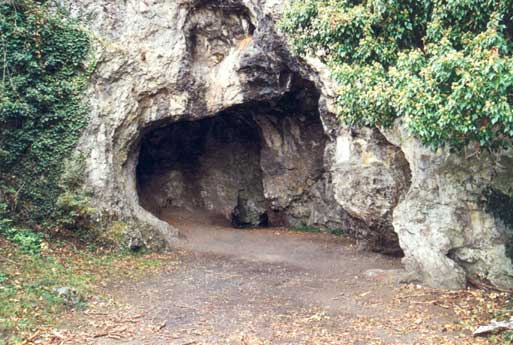
- Spy Cave entrance

- Location in Belgium
- 50°28′56″N 4°40′9″E
- Type: limestone
- Associated with: Neanderthals, Homo sapiens
- Location: near Spy
- Region: Jemeppe-sur-Sambre, Namur Province, Belgium

Site notes
- Material: limestone Karst
- Excavation dates: 1886
- Archaeologists: Marcel de Puydt, Max Lohest

Spy Cave (French: Grotte de Spy) is located in Wallonia near Spy in the municipality of Jemeppe-sur-Sambre, Namur Province, Belgium above the left bank of the Orneau River. Classified as a premier Heritage site of the Walloon Region, the location ranks among the most significant paleolithic sites in Europe. The cave consists of numerous small chambers and corridors.

== Excavations ==
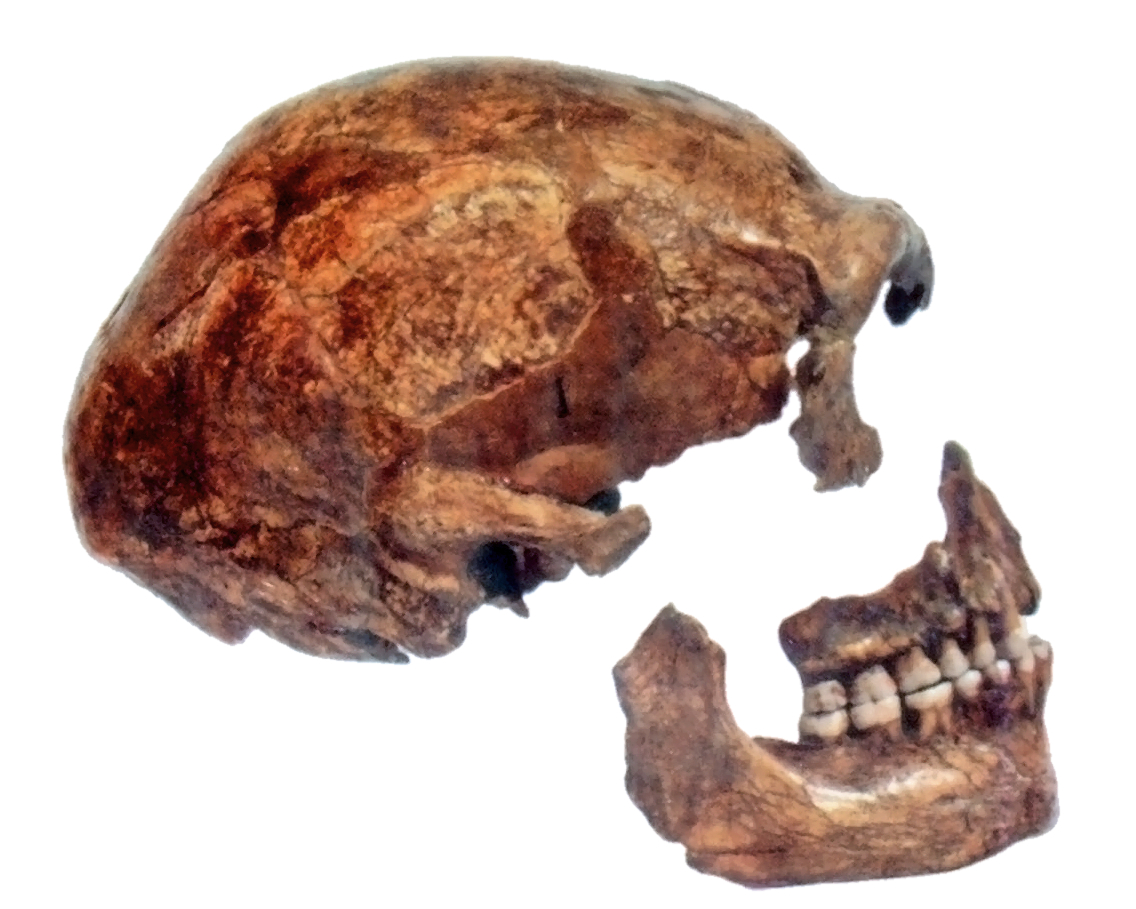
The Spy 2 cranium

Since the first amateur investigations during the late 19th century numerous amateur and professional archaeologists have carried out excavations and removed all sediment deposits of the cave. In 1886 Neanderthal fossils of excellent quality were discovered, which contributed to the 19th century scientific community to occasion the paradigm shift and recognize the existing fossils Engis 2 and Neanderthal 1 and embrace the notion of the mutability of species in an evolutionary context. The excavation was conducted by Liège-based archaeologist Marcel de Puydt and geologist Max Lohest. Paleontologist and zoologist Julien Fraipont published the specimen description in the American Anthropologist journal.

The assemblages of the oldest excavations have been mixed, that makes the interpretation of the palaeoenvironment difficult. In addition publications of de Puydt, Lohest and Fraipoint disagree on the number of layers of knapped flints. Nonetheless, it is assumed that there existed seven, possibly more, Paleolithic occupation sequences, three are attributed to Neanderthals and the Mousterian culture and four to Modern human Upper Paleolithic presence.

The hominid skeletons discovered during the first excavations have been named Spy I, thought to be a female, and Spy 2, a young male. These were dated to around 36,000 years BP (34,000 BC), although a Bayesian analysis in 2014 concluded that they were probably more than 40,000 years old. The identification of the remains of a Neanderthal child, Spy VI, was published in 2010. The identification was made from an analysis of the mandibular remains and the child is thought to have died at about 18 months, "making the Spy Neandertal remains the youngest ever directly dated in northwest Europe." A paper in Anthropologica et Præhistorica states that the original excavators at Spy did not believe that the remains were deliberately buried in graves but that this hypothesis is "now widely accepted".

== Archaeogenetics ==
In 2018, researchers succeeded in extracting DNA from Spy94a, an upper right molar that has been directly dated to around 39,150-37,880 BP. Researchers believe that Spy94a belongs to Spy 1. DNA analysis reveals that Spy94a was male. Compared to other Neanderthals for which nuclear DNA has been extracted, Spy94a is genetically closest to Goyet Q56-1 from Goyet Caves and groups closest with other Late European Neanderthals.

== Mammoth consumption ==
Almost 12,000 faunal remains of the Pleistocene were discovered, including mammoth, horse, cave hyena, woolly rhinoceros, reindeer, and cave bear bones.

All levels contained mammoth remains, including an unusual (compared to other sites) number of molars. It has been suggested that the Neanderthal occupants brought mammoth heads to the site and ate the brains. Because many of the molars were unworn, these would have been very young or newborn calves, "killed in early spring, when plant food would not yet have been available."

== Anatomically modern humans ==
Evidence of occupation by Upper Paleolithic anatomically modern humans has also been found at Spy. A report published in 2013 states that "Based on cut-marked bones, remains with ochre traces and an Aurignacian spear point, it seems that AMH visited Spy at least three times: at around 34,500 BP, 33,000 BP and 26,000 BP." Pendants and perforated beads made from mammoth ivory, presumably by modern humans, were found in the cave.

== See also ==
- Goyet Caves
