= Jemeppe-sur-Sambre =

Municipality in Namur Province, Wallonia, Belgium

Jemeppe-sur-Sambre Djimepe-so-Sambe (Walloon)
- Municipality
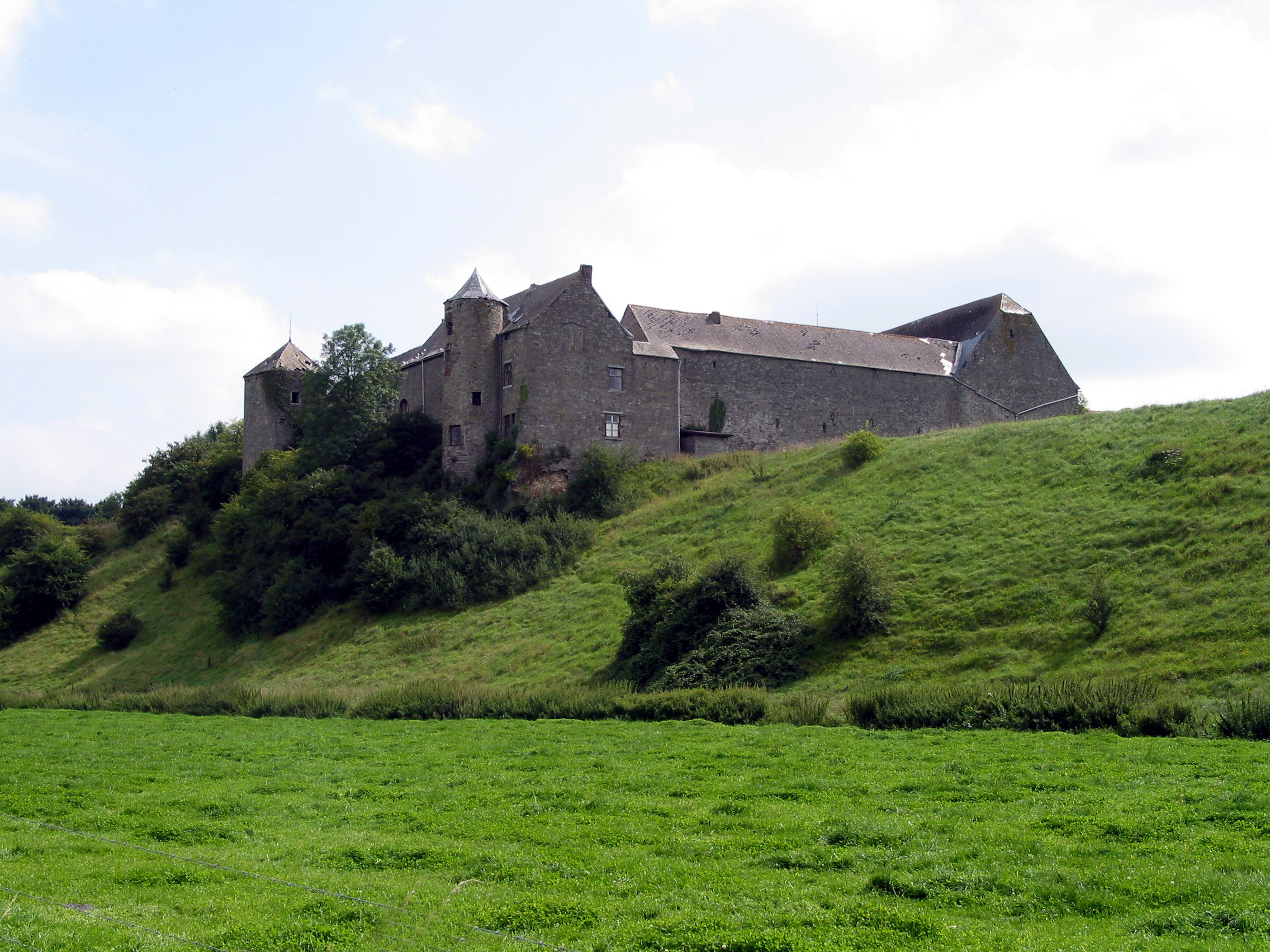
- Balâtre Castle, early 13th century

- Flag Coat of arms

- Location of Jemeppe-sur-Sambre in Namur Province
- Interactive map of Jemeppe-sur-Sambre
- Location in Belgium
- Coordinates: 50°28′N 04°40′E
- Country: Belgium
- Community: French Community
- Region: Wallonia
- Province: Namur
- Arrondissement: Namur

Government
  - Mayor: Stéphanie Thoron
  - Governing party: JEM

Area
  - Total: 46.94 km^{2} (18.12 sq mi)

Population (2018-01-01)
  - Total: 19,074
  - Density: 406.3/km^{2} (1,052/sq mi)
- Postal codes: 5190
- NIS code: 92140
- Area codes: 071
- Website: www.jemeppe-sur-sambre.be

Jemeppe-sur-Sambre (French: [ʒəmɛp syʁ sɑ̃bʁ]; Walloon: Djimepe-so-Sambe) is a municipality of Wallonia located in the province of Namur, Belgium.

On 1 January 2006, the municipality had 17,990 inhabitants. The total area is 46.80 km^{2} (18.07 mi^{2}), giving a population density of 384 inhabitants per km^{2}.

The municipality consists of the districts of: Balâtre, Ham-sur-Sambre, Jemeppe-sur-Sambre, Mornimont, Moustier-sur-Sambre, Onoz, Saint-Martin (including the hamlet of Villeret), and Spy.

The Spy Cave, among the most significant Paleolithic sites in Europe, is located in the municipality. The medieval Balâtre Castle is in the village of Balâtre, and Mielmont Castle is in Onoz.

== See also ==
- List of protected heritage sites in Jemeppe-sur-Sambre
