= Spy, Belgium =

Coordinates: 50°29′N 4°42′E

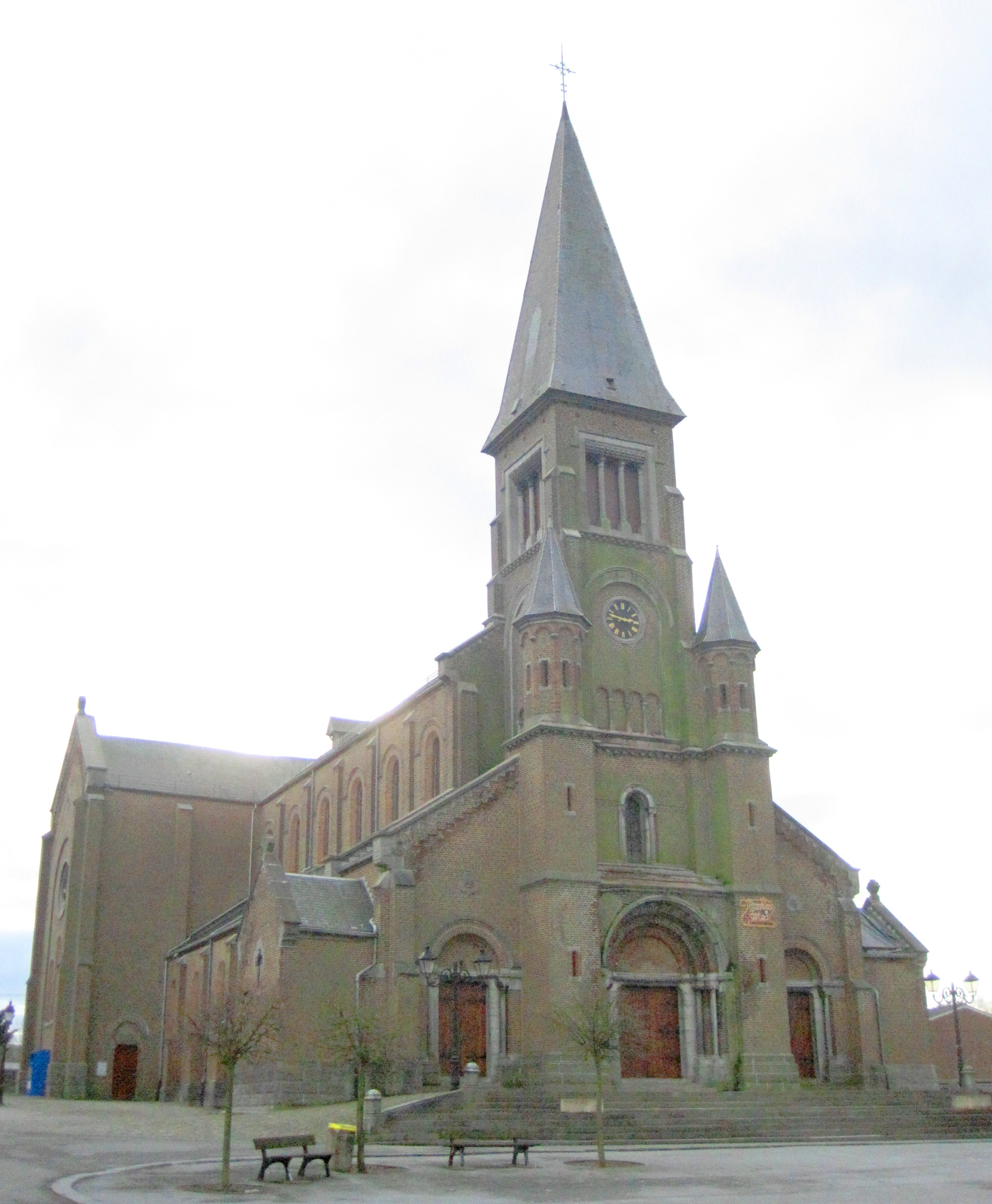
The church of St. Amand (1900)

Spy (French pronunciation: [spi]; Walloon: Spî) is a village of Wallonia and a district of the municipality of Jemeppe-sur-Sambre, located in the province of Namur, Belgium.

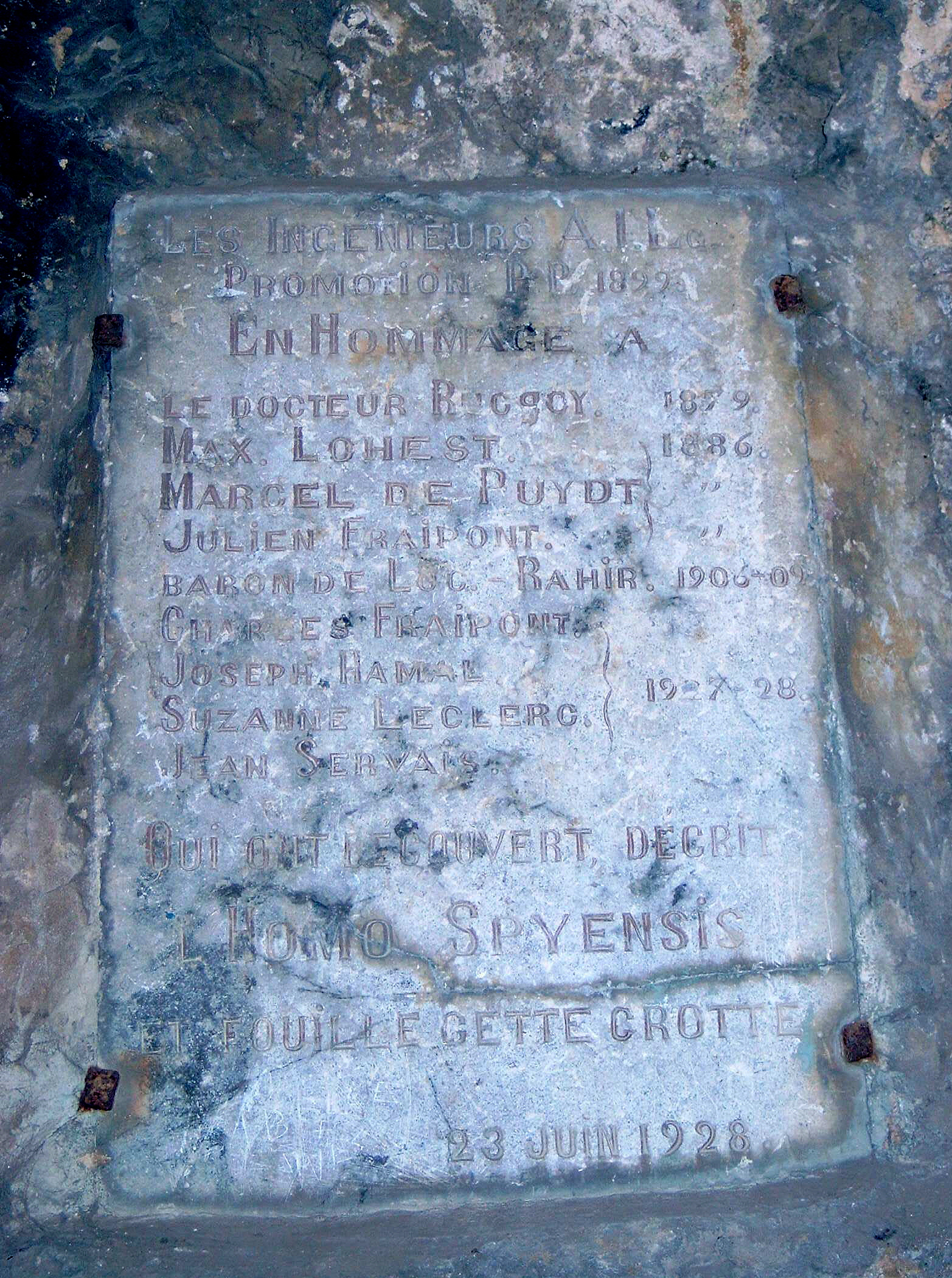
Commemoration plate for the archaeologists

Here in 1886, in the Grotte de Spy or the Betche aux Roches cavern, Maximin Lohest and Marcel de Puydt found two nearly perfect Neanderthal skeletons (man and woman) at the depth of 16 feet (4.9 m), with numerous implements of the Mousterian type. Recently, Yves Saquet found a third skeleton of the same age.
