= Vielsalm =

Municipality in Wallonia, Belgium

Vielsalm: Li Viye Såm (Walloon)
- Municipality
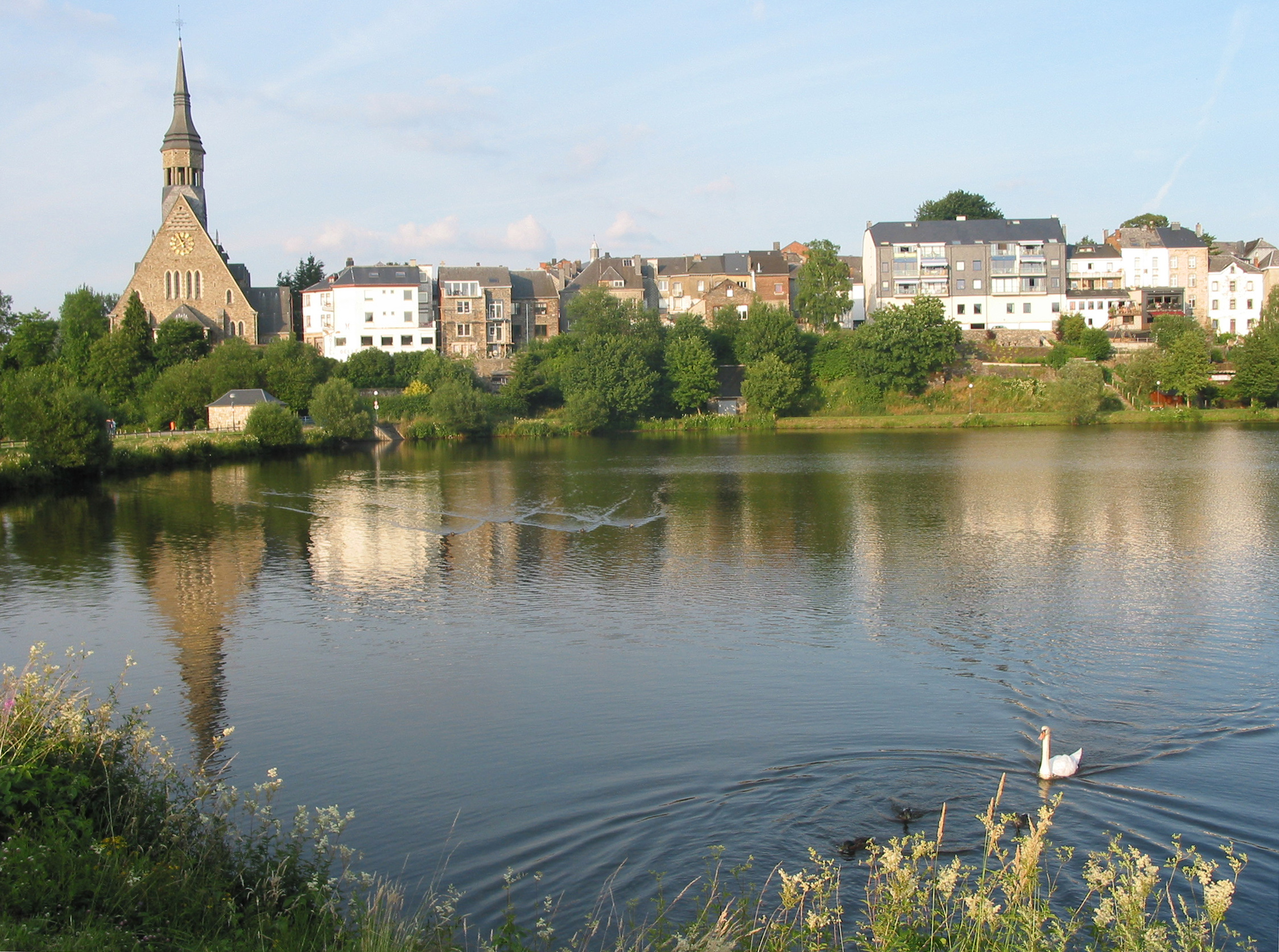
- Vielsalm, reflected in the lake

- Flag Coat of arms

- Location of Vielsalm in Luxembourg province
- Interactive map of Vielsalm
- Location in Belgium
- Coordinates: 50°17′N 05°55′E
- Country: Belgium
- Community: French Community
- Region: Wallonia
- Province: Luxembourg
- Arrondissement: Bastogne

Government
  - Mayor: Elie Deblire
  - Governing party: Liste du Bourgmestre

Area
  - Total: 140.7 km^{2} (54.3 sq mi)

Population (2018-01-01)
  - Total: 7,821
  - Density: 55.59/km^{2} (144.0/sq mi)
- Postal codes: 6690, 6692, 6698
- NIS code: 82032
- Area codes: 080
- Website: vielsalm.be

Vielsalm (French pronunciation: [vjɛlsalm]; Walloon: Li Viye Såm) is a municipality of Wallonia located in the province of Luxembourg, Belgium. The town is part of the Arrondissement of Bastogne. It is the place of origin of the House of Salm.

On 1 January 2018 the municipality had 7,821 inhabitants. The total area is 139.76 km^{2}, giving a population density of 56 inhabitants per km^{2}.

== Etymology ==
The town, like Salmchâteau, takes its name from the River Salm. The region is also called the Val de Salm, and Salm region. The word "Salm" comes from the Celtic salwa, meaning black or blurred. Vielsalm means literally "Old Salm" because, at some point, the Lord moved his castle which became the new town centre.

A different popular etymology says Salm and Vielsalm are taken from the German Salm, meaning salmon. The arms of the ancient house of Salm and those of the town are based on this interpretation.

== Geography ==
Vielsalm is located in the Ardennes mountain range and the highest point within the municipal boundary is the Baraque de Fraiture, 652 metres (2,139 ft) high. The town is surrounded by forests and farmland. In the centre is a large lake.

The municipality consists of the following districts: Bihain, Grand-Halleux, Petit-Thier, and Vielsalm. Other population centers include Commanster, Fraiture, Farnières, Hébronval, Ottré, Provedroux, Jubiéval, Regné, Rencheux, Ville-du-Bois, Petit-Halleux and Salmchâteau.

The town is situated between two main motorways, the E25 (N30) from Liège to Bastogne and the E42 (N62) at St. Vith which leads to Bitburg just across the border in Germany.

== History ==
The modern municipality is the product of the merger of the former municipalities of Vielsalm, Grand Halleux, Petit Thier and Bihain along with some parts of Lierneux, Beho Arbrefontaine.

There is evidence of habitation from neolithic times in the form of stone polishers. There is a Celtic enclosure and traces of gold mining. There are some evidence of a Middle Age castle near the church in Vielsalm, and the remains of a 14th-century castle near Salmchâteau consisting of two towers with a narrow entrance.

In World War II, the 75th Infantry Division of the U.S. Army, 575th Signal Co., maintained its command post in the town from January 19–22, 1945, as it counterattacked against the German Army.

== Economy ==
The town has significant mining operations of slate, and a local whetstone, called coticule. The extracted coticule in Vielsalm owes its very fine abrasive properties to spessartine, which is a particular variety of garnet. The coticule is a metamorphic microcristalin schist, very fine grained, 35 to 40% of it small crystals of spessartine, of about 5 to 20 μm in diameter. These quarries, which are now almost exhausted, have been operating since the beginning of the 16th century to make razor stones prized for their longevity. The town currently has an industrial zone in Burtonville, in which are located small and medium-sized enterprises.

== Culture ==
There is an annual Fête de la Myrtille, or Feast of the Blueberries, which started on July 21, 1951. The local Traders Association wanted a way to attract visitors to stop in the town. So they had local people in traditional costume invite visitors stop and handed them a small dish of local fruit including blueberries. The parade features, amongst others, local folklore such as Les Macralles, or witches in Walloon.

== Sights ==
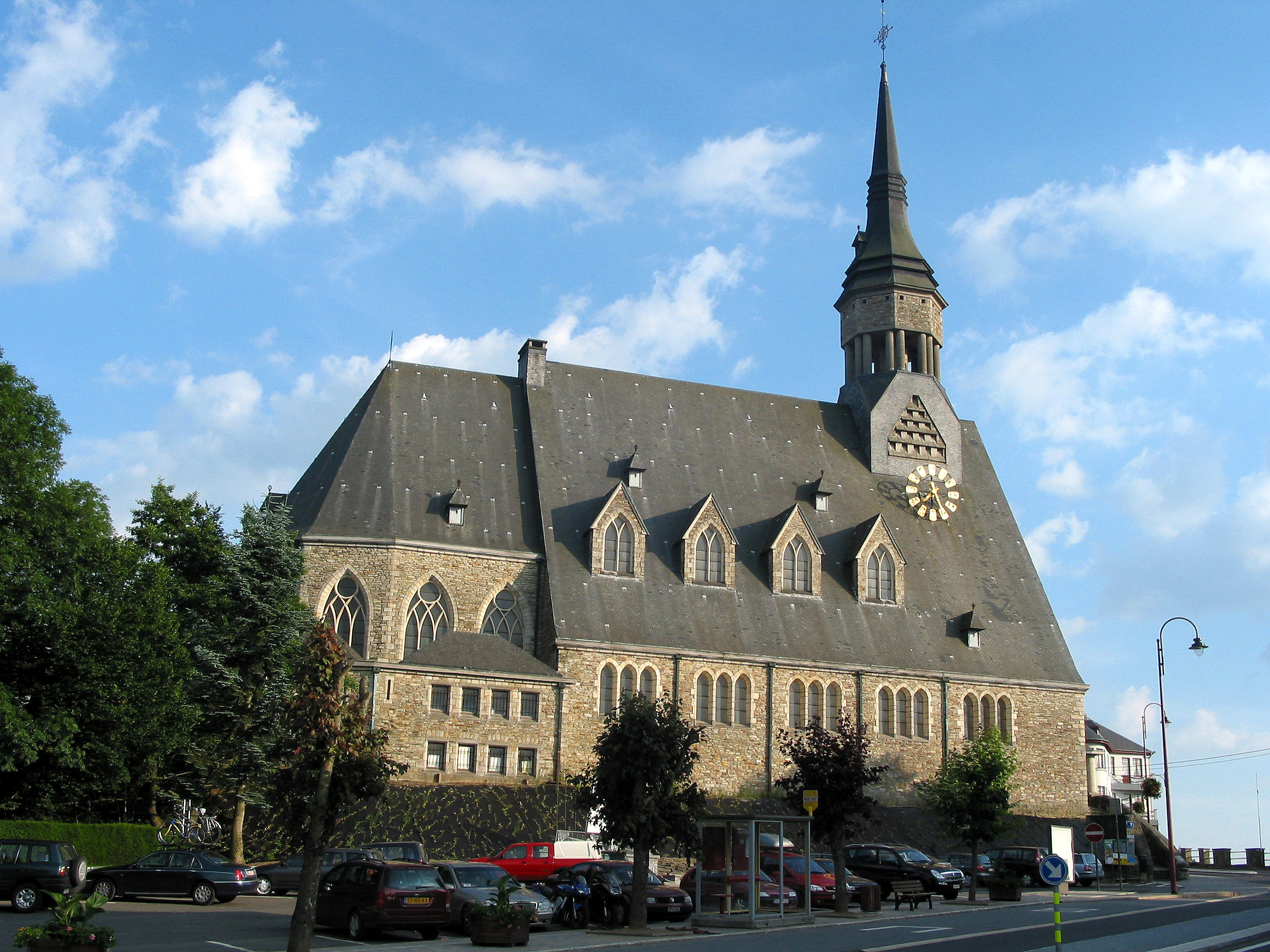
St. Gengoul's church in Vielsalm

- Parish Church Saint-Gengoux
- Chapel of Our Lady of Luxembourg
- The "Petit Croix"
- Maison Lambert
- Ancient Maison Ruth
- Villa des Effats
- Town hall

== Governance ==
The municipality is operated in a two-tier system. Daily administration, by way implementing council resolutions, is the duty of the College of Aldermen, led by a mayor, acting as an executive body. The aldermen are elected for six years by the council from among its members, their number varying from two to ten according to population of the municipality (e.g. in 2012 there were the college mayor, four aldermen and the president of the Council of Social Action). The council is directly elected by the people to determine tax collection and expenditure, decide education issues, maintenance of the buildings, roads and green areas etc. The exact number depends upon the population of the municipality.

== Education ==
There are seven schools in the municipality covering pre-school, primary and secondary education in the town. They are the École communale de Goronne, École communale primaire d'Hébronval, École communale de Petit-Thier, École communale primaire de Regné, École communale maternelle de Regné, École communale de Rencheux, École communale de Salmchâteau and École communale primaire de Ville-du-Bois. There are also three Nursery and Primary, as well as one Secondary, schools that are designated as free.

== Notable residents ==
- Nicholas, Count of Salm, (1459-1530), German military commander
- Olivier Werner (born April 16, 1985), football player of RAEC Mons

== Twinning ==
Vielsalm is twinned with:

- (France) Bruyères, a town in the Vosges of Lorraine.
