= Geologica Belgica =

Peer-reviewed journal on earth sciences

- Discipline: Geology
- Language: English
- Edited by: Annick Anceau

Publication details
- History: 1998–present
- Publisher: The University of Liège Library (Belgium)
- Open access: Yes
- License: CC BY-NC-SA 3.0
- Impact factor: 0.879 (2018)

Standard abbreviations
- ISO 4: Geol. Belg.

Indexing
- ISSN: 1374-8505 (print); 2034-1954 (web)

Links
- Journal homepage

Geologica Belgica is a Diamond Open Access peer-reviewed scholarly journal publishing papers concerning all aspects of the earth sciences, with a particular emphasis on the regional geology of Belgium, North West Europe and central Africa. It is published on the Portail de Publication de Périodiques Scientifiques (PoPuPS) platform operated by the University of Liège Library. The current executive editor is Annick Anceau. The journal is published by the Geologica Belgica Luxemburga Scientia & Professionis association based in Brussels (Belgium).

== Abstracting and indexing ==
The journal is abstracted and indexed in:

- DOAJ
- Science Citation Index Expanded
- BIOSIS Previews
- Biological Abstracts
- Essential Science Indicators
- Zoological Record
