= Félix Pisani =

French mineralogist (1831–1920)

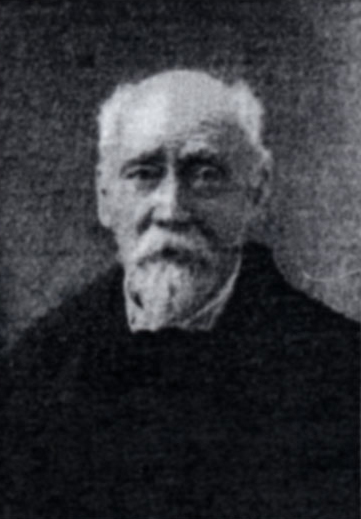
Félix Pisani (1831–1920)

Félix Pisani (28 April 1831 in Constantinople – 7 November 1920 in Paris) was a French chemist and mineralogist.

He was born in Istanbul, where his Venetian father worked in the Russian diplomatic service. Beginning in 1854, he studied chemistry in Paris at a private school run by Charles Frédéric Gerhardt (1816–1856).

Best known as a dealer in minerals and other geological materials, Pisani maintained a private laboratory on the Rue de Furstenberg in Paris, from where he conducted private lectures and performed consultant work. His laboratory was a popular meeting place of local mineralogists until the creation of the Société minéralogique de France in 1878, of which Pisani was a founding member.

His primary written work was Traité élémentaire de minéralogie ("Elementary treatise of mineralogy"), first published in 1875. In 1860, the mineral pisanite was named in his honor by Gustav Adolph Kenngott.

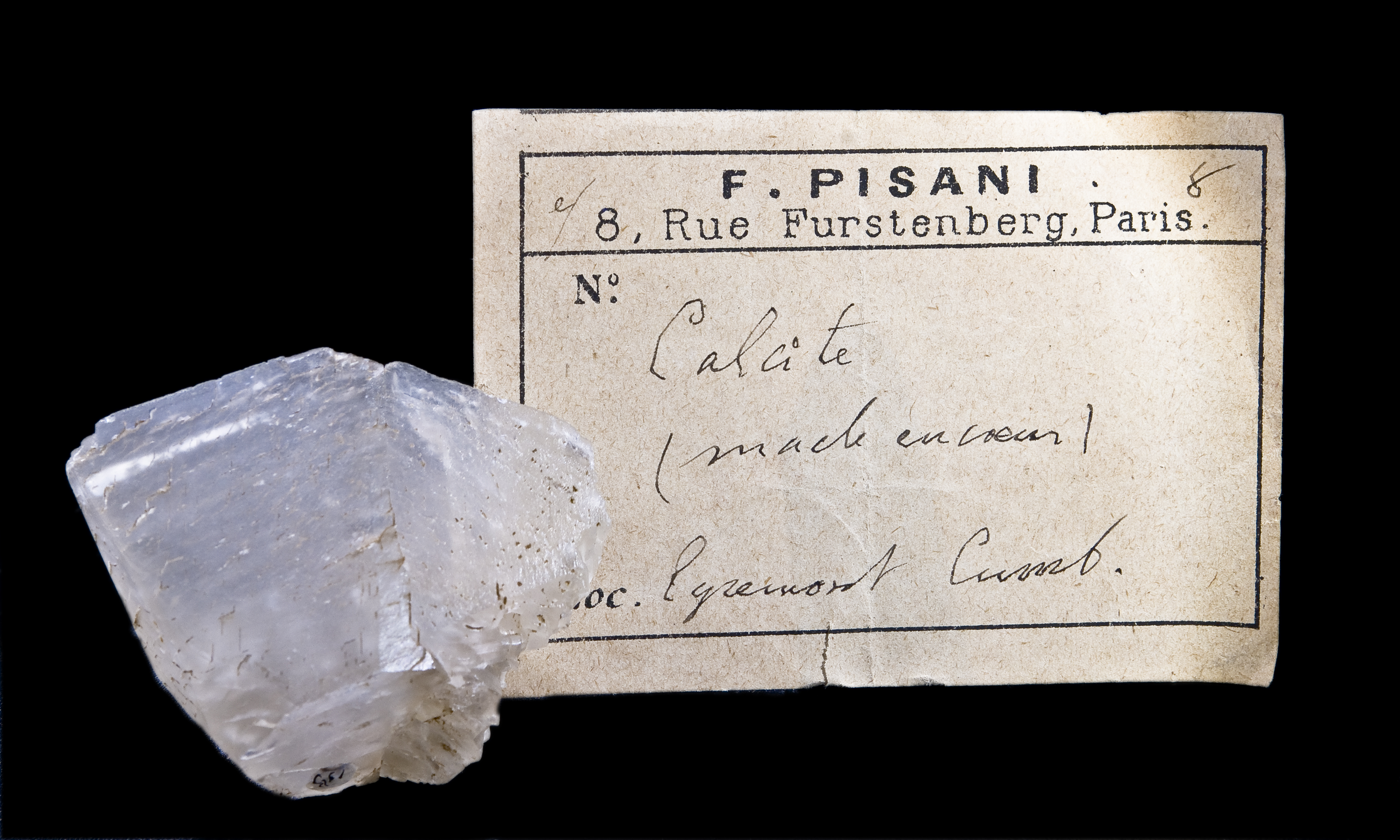
Calcite - Next Macle[1011] - Autograph of Pisani - Egremont Cumberland England

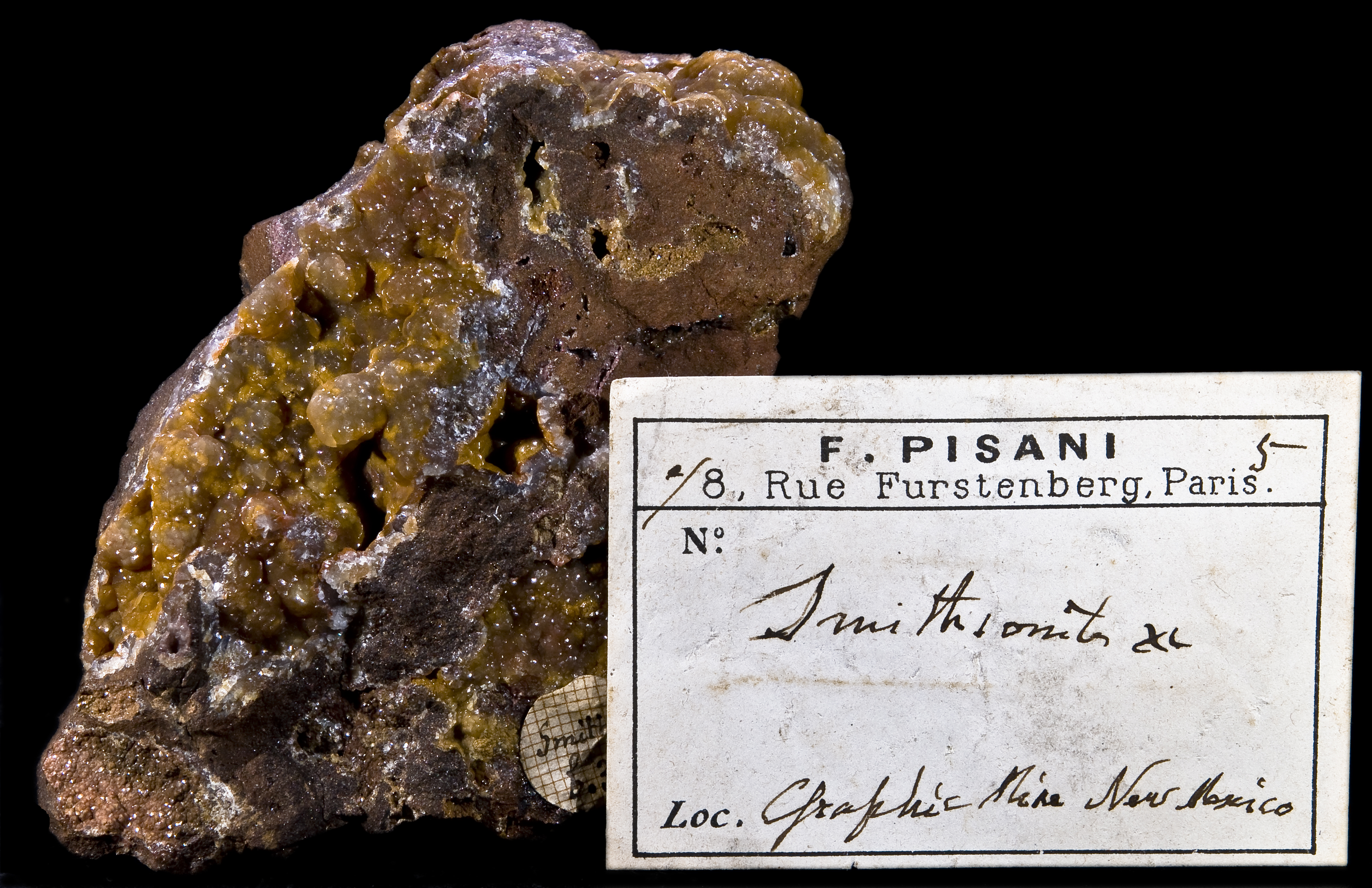
Smithsonite - Pisani Autograph - Graphic Mine, New Mexico, USA

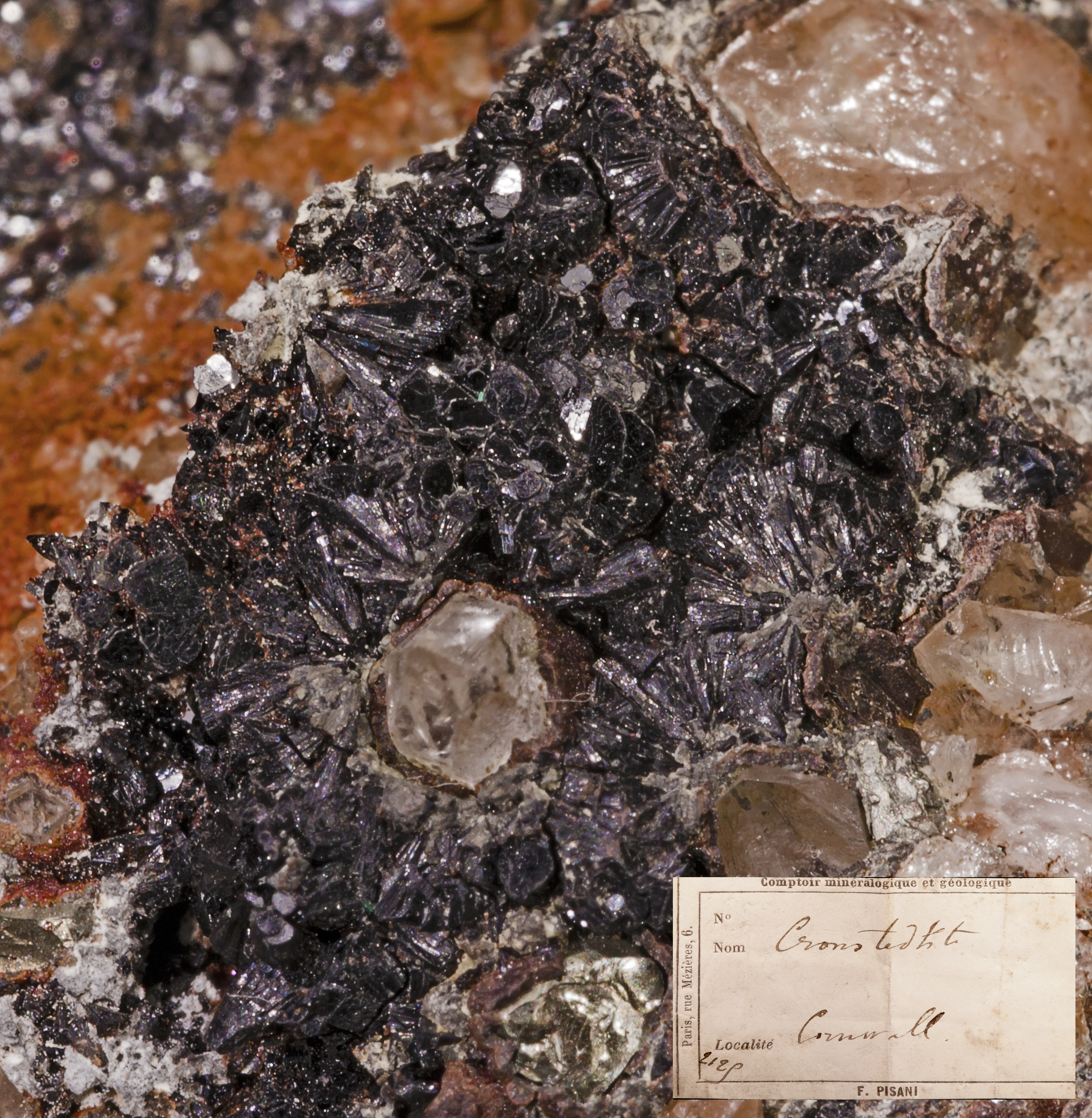
Cronstedtite- Autograph of Pisani - Cornwall, England
