= Laurent-Guillaume de Koninck =

Belgian paleontologist and chemist (1809–1887)

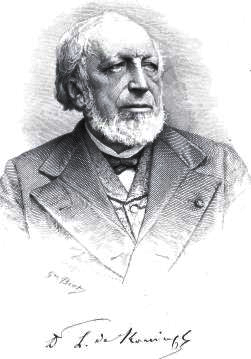
Laurent-Guillaume de Koninck

Laurent-Guillaume de Koninck (3 May 1809 – 16 July 1887) was a Belgian palaeontologist and chemist, born in Leuven.

He studied medicine at the State University of Leuven, and in 1831 he became assistant in the chemical schools. He also studied chemistry in Paris, Berlin, and Gießen, later teaching the subject in Ghent and Liège. In 1856, he was appointed professor of chemistry at the University of Liège, a position he held until his death.

About the year 1835 he began to devote his leisure to the investigation of the Carboniferous fossils around Liège, and ultimately he became distinguished for his researches on the palaeontology of the Palaeozoic rocks, and especially for his descriptions of the molluscs, brachiopods, crustaceans and crinoids of the Carboniferous limestone of Belgium. In recognition of this work the Wollaston medal was awarded to him in 1875 by the Geological Society of London, and in 1876 he was appointed professor of palaeontology at Liège. In 1882, he was elected as a member to the American Philosophical Society.

He was awarded the Clarke Medal by the Royal Society of New South Wales in 1886.

Publications:

- Eléments de chimie inorganique (1839)
- Description des animaux fossiles qui se trouvent dans le terrain Carbonifère de Belgique (1842–1844, supp. 1851)
- Recherches sur les animaux fossiles (1847, 1873)

See Notice sur LG de Koninck, by E Dupont; Annuaire de l'Aced. roy. de Belgique (1891), with portrait and bibliography.

Awards
Preceded by Joseph Dalton Hooker	Clarke Medal; 1886	Succeeded by James Hector
