= Salmchâteau =

Coordinates: 50.2664°N 5.9061°E

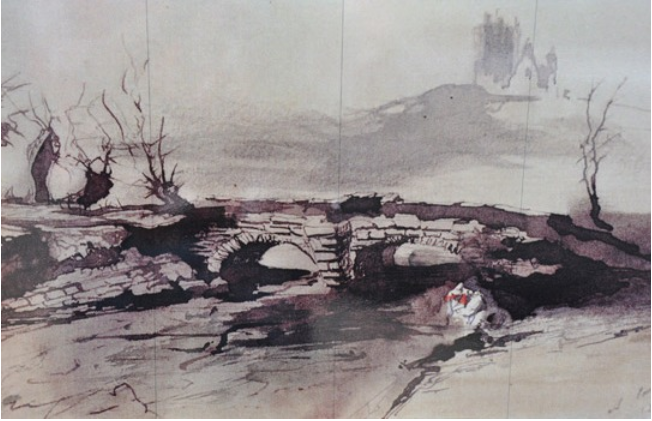
Madeleine bridge by Victor Hugo, who visited the village in 1862.

Salmchâteau (French pronunciation: [salmʃato]; Luxembourgish: Salem; Walloon: Såm) is a village of Wallonia in the municipality and district of Vielsalm, located in the province of Luxembourg, Belgium. It is situated on the river Salm.

The Counts of Salm build a château in Salmchâteau, of which only two towers remain. This gave the village its name.

A museum focused on the grinding wheel and regional geology is located in the village.
