= Trazegnies =

Trazegnies may refer to:

- Marquess of Trazegnies d'Ittre, Belgian nobility
- Trazegnies, Belgium, a place near Courcelles
- Trazegnies Castle, Courcelles
