= Wolfers =

Wolfers may refer to:

- Wolfers (hunting)
- Competitive eating, known commonly as wolfing

== People ==
- Arnold Wolfers
- Justin Wolfers Australian economist
- Marcel Wolfers
- Philippe Wolfers
