= Arton =

Arton may refer to:

== People ==
Given name

- Arton Zekaj, Serbian footballer of Kosovo Albanian descent

Surname

- Anthony Bourne-Arton, British Conservative Party politician
- Oliver Rendell Arton

== Places ==
- Arton Mill, Belgium; a protected place, see List of protected heritage sites in Gembloux
- Arton Point, Philippines, a headland, see List of headlands of the Philippines

== Other uses ==
- 18 (number), arton in Swedish

== See also ==
- Cheryl McArton (born 1956) Canadian swimmer
