= Château de Corroy-le-Château =

Medieval castle in Wallonia, Belgium

Coordinates: 50.5328°N 4.6561°E

Castle of Corroy-le-Château
- Corroy-le-Château, province of Namur, Wallonia, Belgium
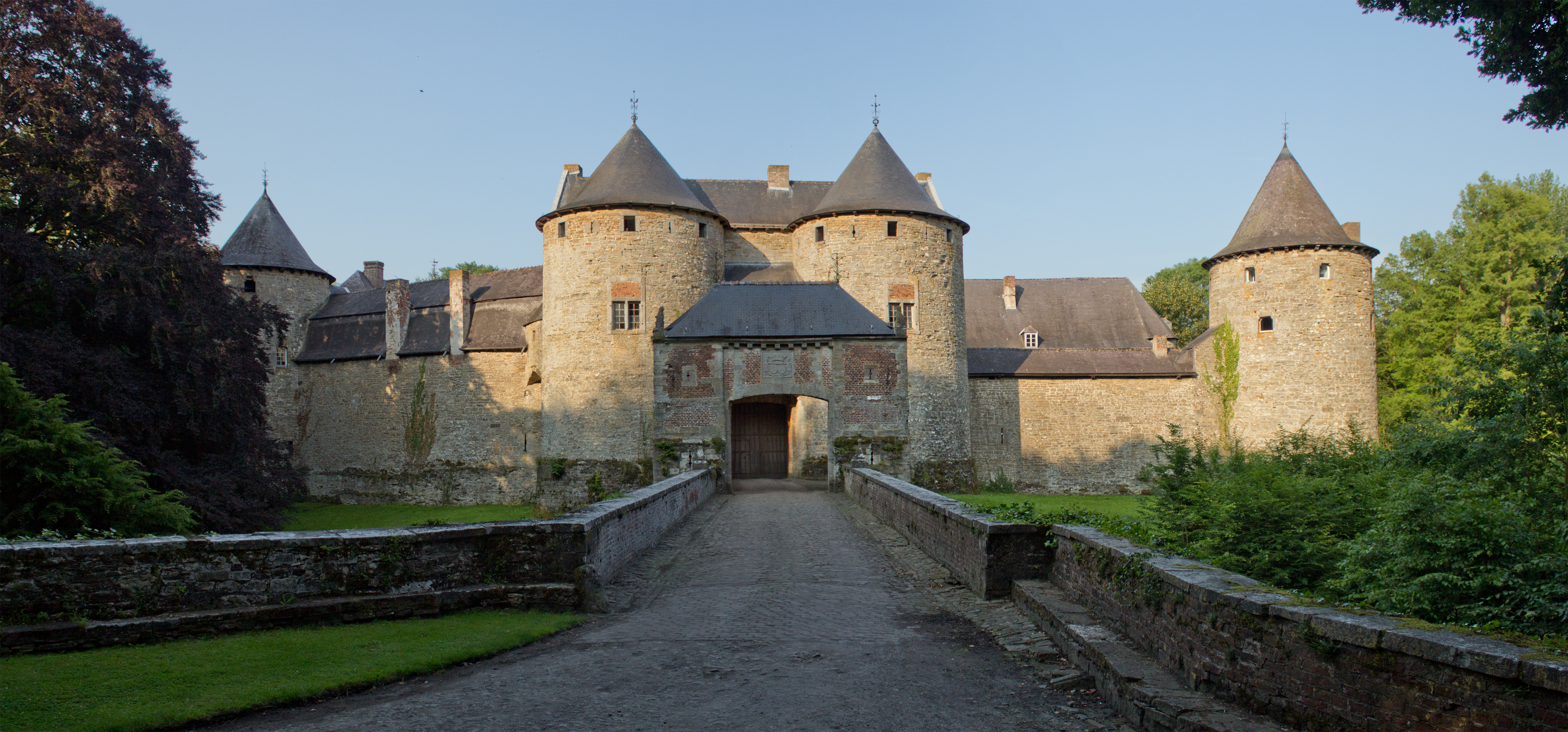

Site information
- Type: Castle
- Owner: Association Royale des Demeures Historiques et Jardins de Belgique

Site history
- Built: 13th century
- Materials: Stone

The Castle of Corroy-le-Château (French: Château de Corroy-le-Château) is a medieval castle in the village of Corroy-le-Château, near Gembloux, in the province of Namur, Wallonia, Belgium. Originally built between 1220 and 1230 by William of Brabant, the castle is one of the best-preserved medieval buildings in Belgium, with gigantic round towers and a moat.

== History ==
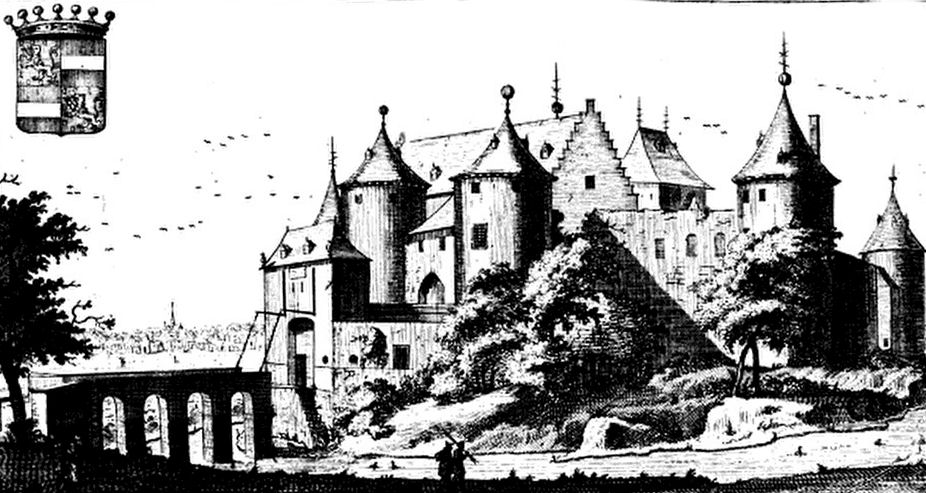
The castle engraved in Brabantia illustrata

After some eight hundred years in the possession of the descendants of William of Brabant, the counts of Nassau-Corroy. One of the owners was Alexis of Nassau-Corroy, bastard son of Henry III of Nassau-Breda. His descendant Joseph-Ignace de Nassau, 1st Count of Corroy, refurbished the castle and interior. The latest of whom to live there of their descendants is Olivier, Marquis de Trazegnies.

=== 2008 auction ===
A family dispute led to a court ordering the sale of the castle at public auction. In 2008, it was to be sold to the artist Wim Delvoye, who announced that he planned to turn it into a museum of modern art. However, the Marquis de Trazegnies managed to defeat the sale and retain ownership of his ancestral home. In 2010, he ceded the property to the Association Royale des Demeures Historiques et Jardins de Belgique.

== See also ==
- List of castles in Belgium
- Trazegnies Castle

== Sources ==
- Auction site of castle
- Corroy-le-Château – www.chateauxdelameuse.eu
