= Gembloux =

City in Wallonia, Belgium

Gembloux Djiblou (Walloon): Gembloers (Dutch)
- City and municipality
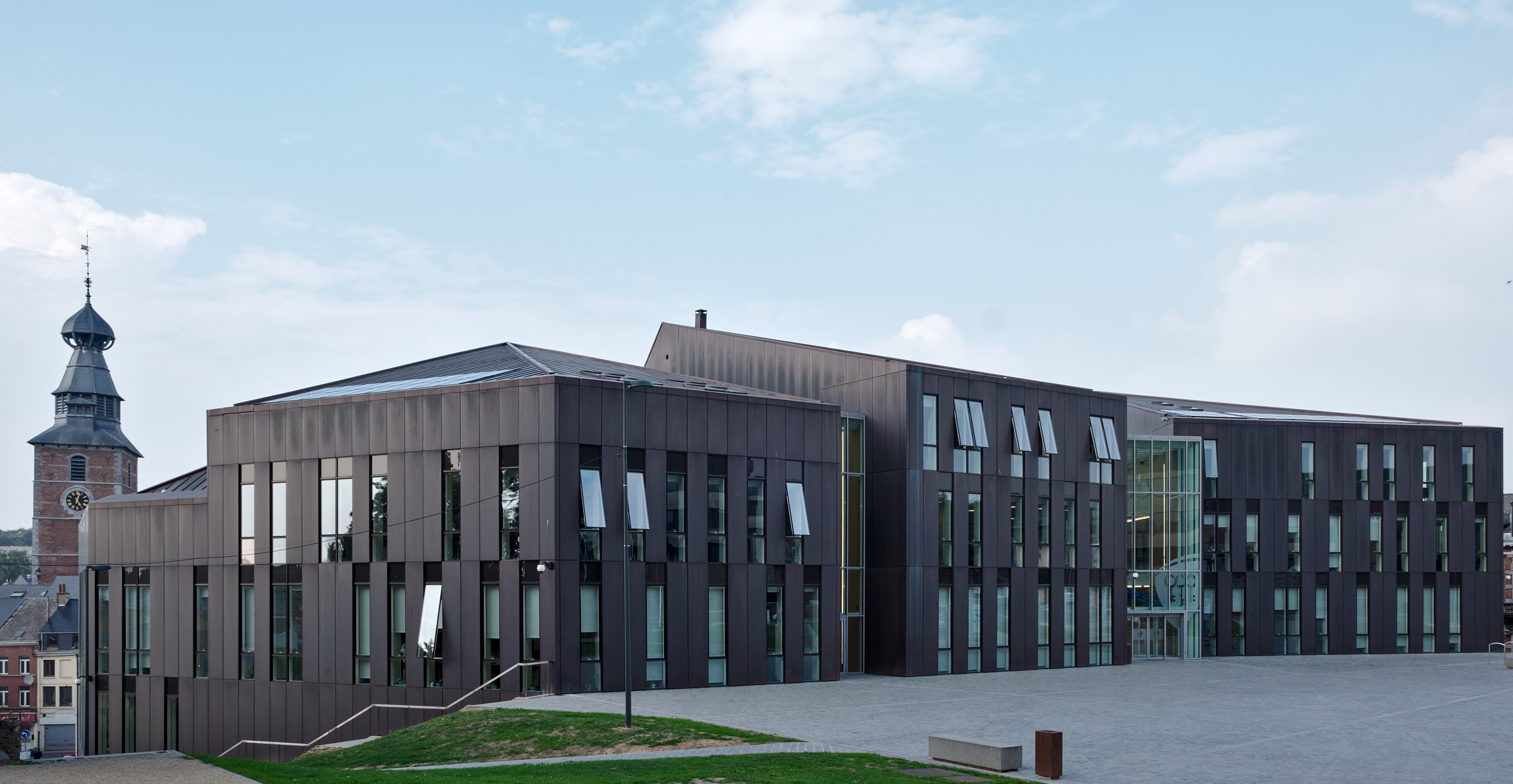
- Town hall with belfry in the background

- Flag Coat of arms

- Location of Gembloux in Namur Province
- Interactive map of Gembloux
- Location in Belgium
- Coordinates: 50°34′N 04°41′E
- Country: Belgium
- Community: French Community
- Region: Wallonia
- Province: Namur
- Arrondissement: Namur

Government
  - Mayor: Benoît Dispa (Bailli)
  - Governing parties: Bailli, Ecolo

Area
  - Total: 96.48 km^{2} (37.25 sq mi)

Population (2018-01-01)
  - Total: 25,933
  - Density: 268.8/km^{2} (696.2/sq mi)
- Postal codes: 5030-5032
- NIS code: 92142
- Area codes: 081
- Website: www.gembloux.be

Gembloux (French: [ʒɑ̃blu]; Walloon: Djiblou; Dutch: Gembloers [ˈɣɛmbluːrs]) is a municipality and city of Wallonia located in the province of Namur, Belgium.

On 1 January 2006, the municipality had 21,964 inhabitants. The total area is 95.86 km^{2}, yielding a population density of 229 inhabitants per km^{2}. The mayor, who was elected on 8 October 2006, is Benoît Dispa.

The municipality consists of the following districts: Beuzet, Bossière, Bothey, Corroy-le-Château, Ernage, Gembloux, Grand-Leez, Grand-Manil, Isnes, Lonzée, Mazy, and Sauvenière.

This city is well known for its Agricultural University and for its cutlery. The university is housed in the historical Abbey of Gembloux, which dates from the tenth century.

Gembloux's belfry is a UNESCO World Heritage Site, as part of the Belfries of Belgium and France site, in recognition of its architecture and testimony to the rise in municipal power in the area.

== History ==
The central city grew around the Gembloux Abbey, founded in the tenth century. In the vicinity of the city, in 1578, the Battle of Gembloux was fought during the Eighty Years' War. In May 1940, the Battle of Hannut and the Battle of the Gembloux Gap took place nearby, tank battles during the larger Battle of France.

== Notable inhabitants ==
- The Marquess of Trazegnies d'Ittre
- Christophe Szpajdel, sketch artist (born 1970)

== Twin towns ==
Gembloux is twinned with

- - Épinal, France : since 1974
- - Loughborough, United Kingdom : since 1993
- - Skyros, Greece : since 1994
- - Aller, Spain : since 2007

== Gallery ==
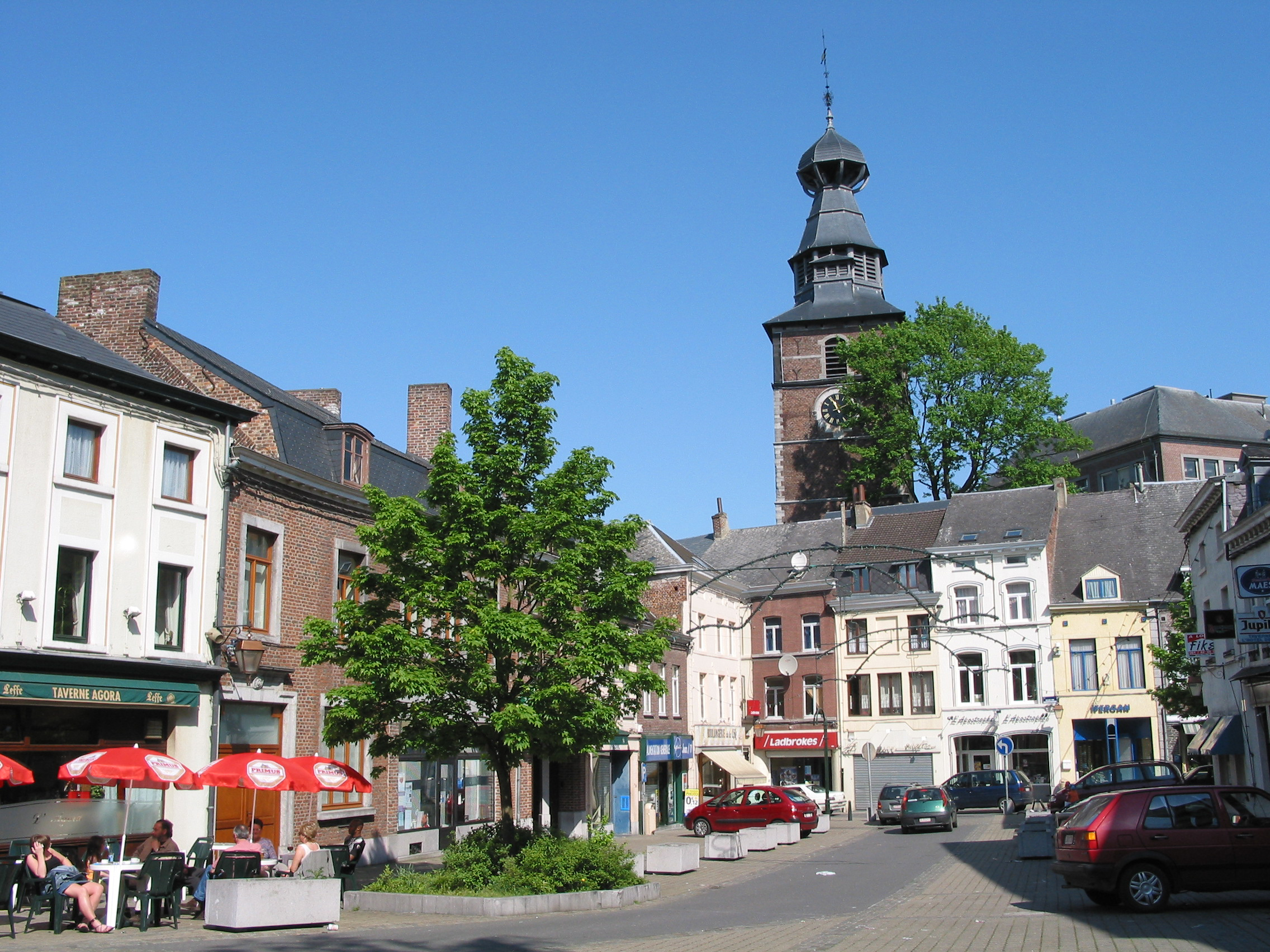
Gembloux town hall square and belfry

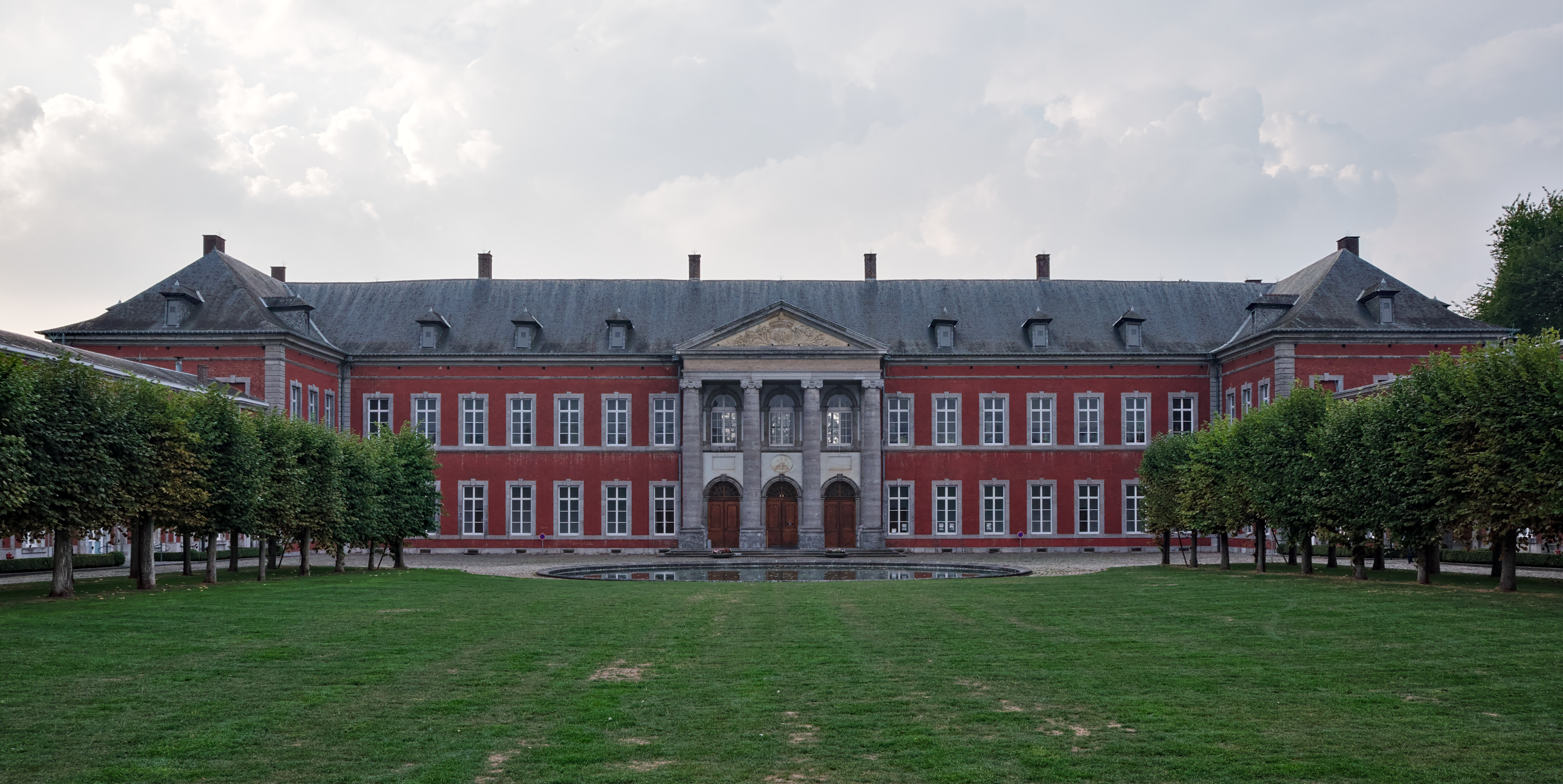
University Faculty of agronomic sciences

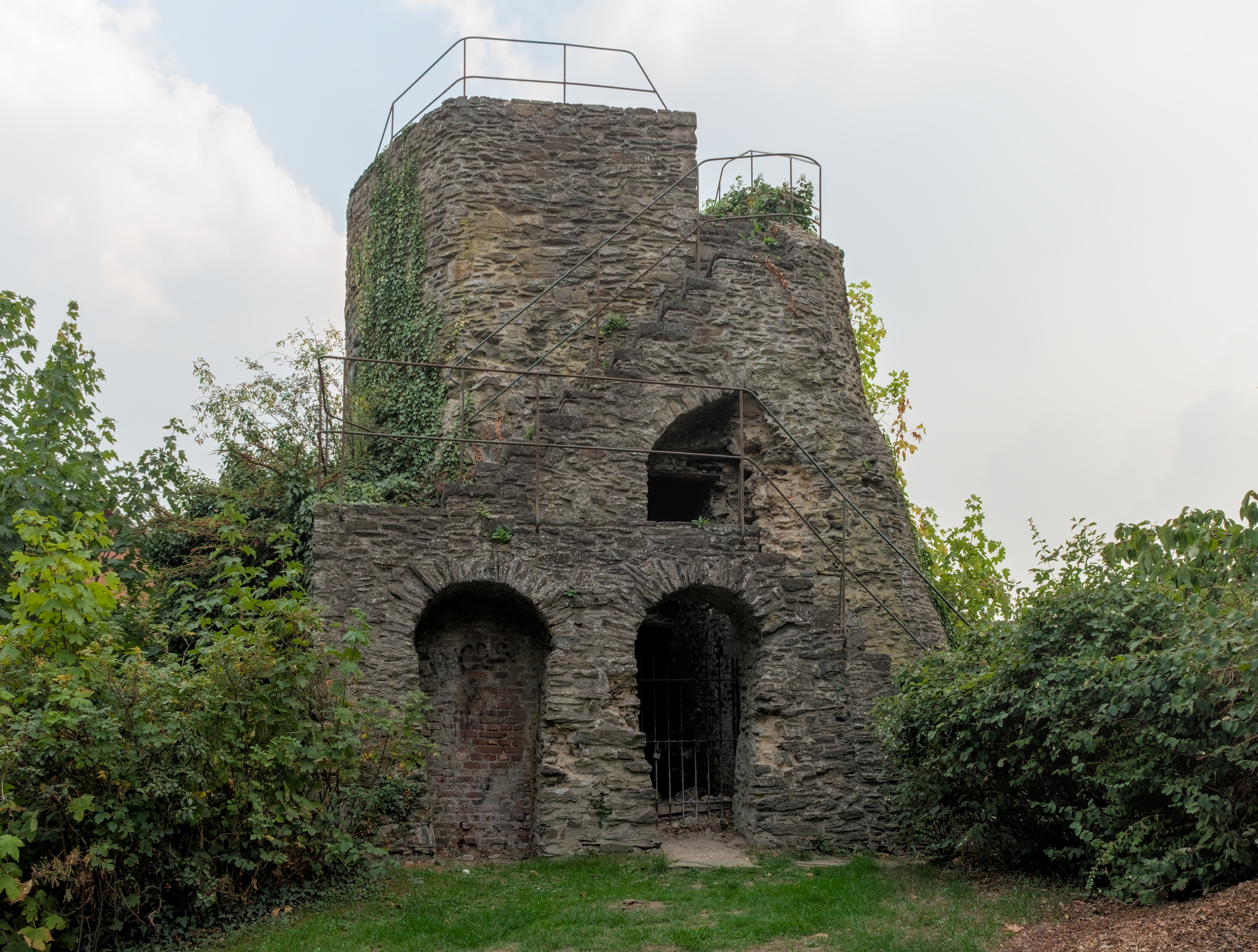
Tour du Guet fortification

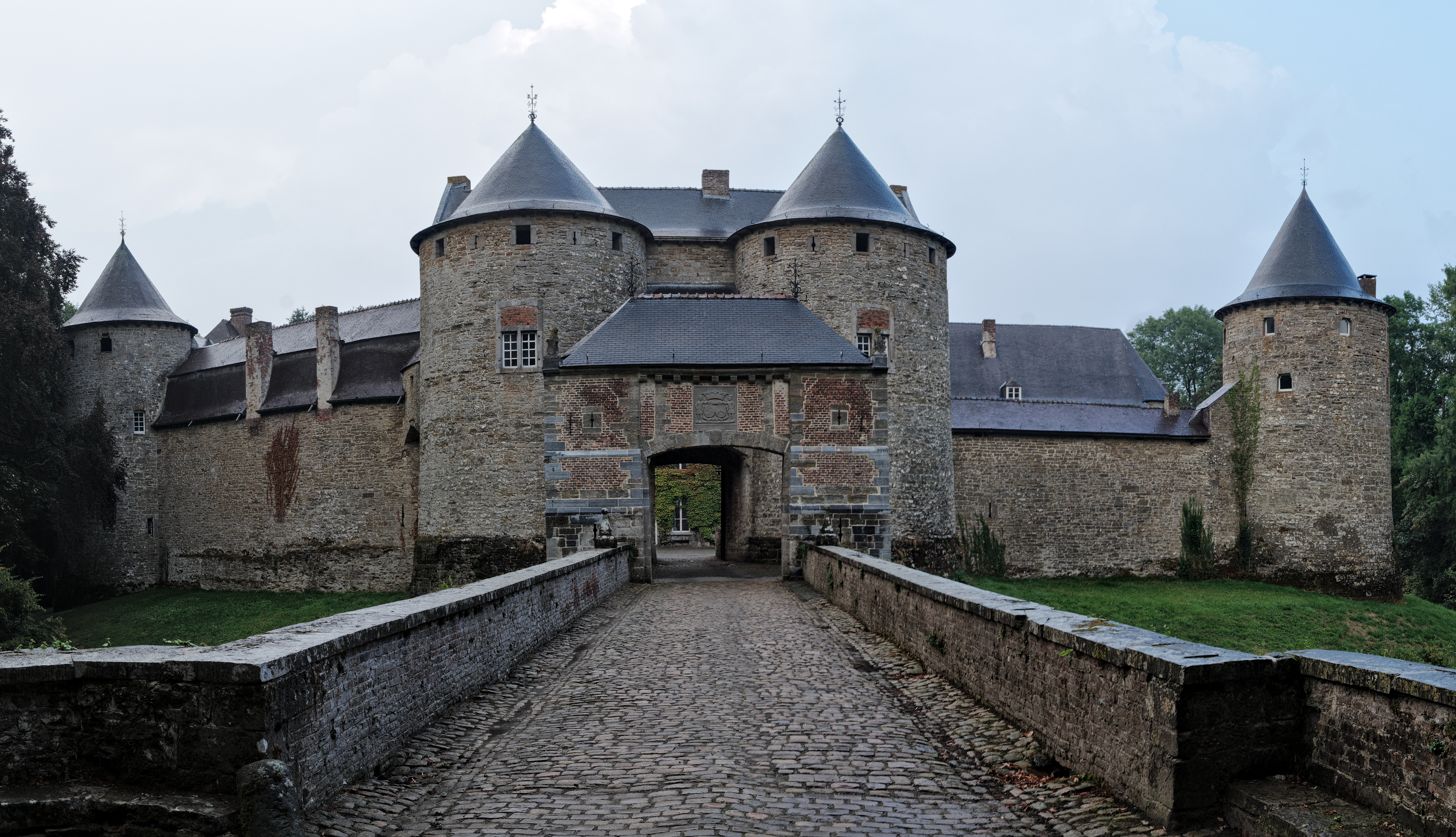
13th century Château de Corroy-le-Château

== See also ==
- List of protected heritage sites in Gembloux
- Crealys Science Park
