= Marcel Wolfers =

Belgian sculptor and medallist

Marcel Wolfers (1886–1976) was a Belgian sculptor, and medallist, well known for his war memorials completed in the Interwar Period (1919–39).

== Early life ==
Marcel Wolfers was born into a talented artistic family in Brussels. His grandfather Louis Wolfers (1820–92) and father Philippe (1858-1929) were well-established decorative artists working in a variety of media, including ceramics and metalwork as well as sculpture. By the turn of the century, Philippe had become one of the best-known Belgian decorative artists in the style called Art Nouveau, frequently collaborating with other prominent figures such as the architect Victor Horta.

Marcel Wolfers matriculated to the Académie Royale des Beaux-Arts in Brussels, where he studied under the multitalented artist Isidore de Rudder (1855-1943), who had actually also trained his father. There Marcel became proficient in sculpture, mainly in ceramics but also in other materials such as metal and stone.

== Career ==
Marcel Wolfers began his artistic career before World War I. He produced several works in 1908 and 1909. Early on, he showed most of his interest in ceramics and began experimenting with lacquers and their ability to produce brilliant colors. 1910, in connection with the Brussels Universal Exhibition he exhibited medals of considerable interest.

At the outbreak of World War I in 1914, when Belgium was invaded by the German armies, he joined the Belgian cavalry, eventually rising to the rank of lieutenant. His exploits in combat brought him many honors and citations: he was named a Chevalier de l'Ordre de la Couronne [Knight of the Order of the Crown] and received the Medal of Yser and the Belgian and French Croix de Guerre, among other decorations.

After the war, he was commissioned to collaborate with several architects on various war memorials, including the Monument aux Martyrs at Louvain, the Monument aux Morts at Trazegnies, the Monument Guynemer at Poelcapelle, and several others. Of these, probably the best known is La Baiser de la Victoire [The Kiss of Victory] (1923), which was installed initially on in the Parc Parmentier in Brussels but in the 1960s was removed a short distance away to the Cimetiere Woluwe de St-Pierre. The bluestone sculpture consists of a central standing bare-chested, unarmed male soldier being embraced and supported from behind by a cloaked woman. Above them to the right, a completely nude female winged figure—undoubtedly a symbol of Victory—contorts her body over the top of the soldier’s head, appearing to lean in to kiss the soldier. A smaller-scale reproduction in wood from 1925 is owned by The Wolfsonian-FIU in Miami Beach, Florida.

== Honours ==
- 1934: Officer in the Order of the Crown.
Works of Marcel Wolfers

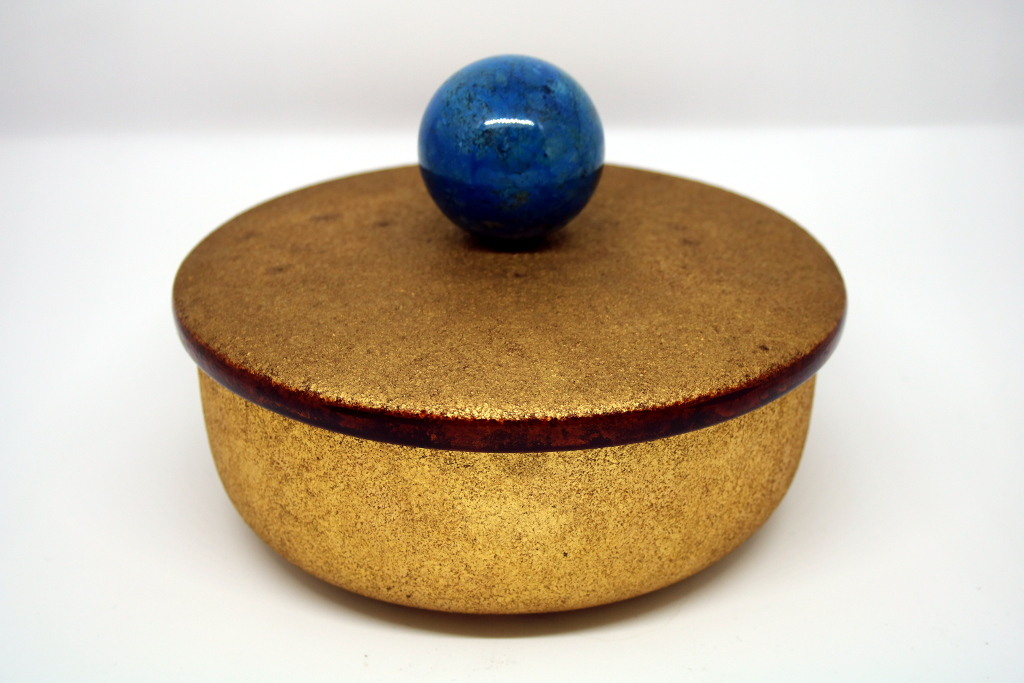
lacquer with gold powder

== Bibliography ==
- Wolfers Philippe et Marcel. De l'art nouveau à l'art déco. Brussels: Musées royaux d'art et d'histoire - Crédit communal de belgique, s.d.
