= Lonzée =

Area of Gembloux, Belgium

Coordinates: 50°33′11″N 4°43′34″E

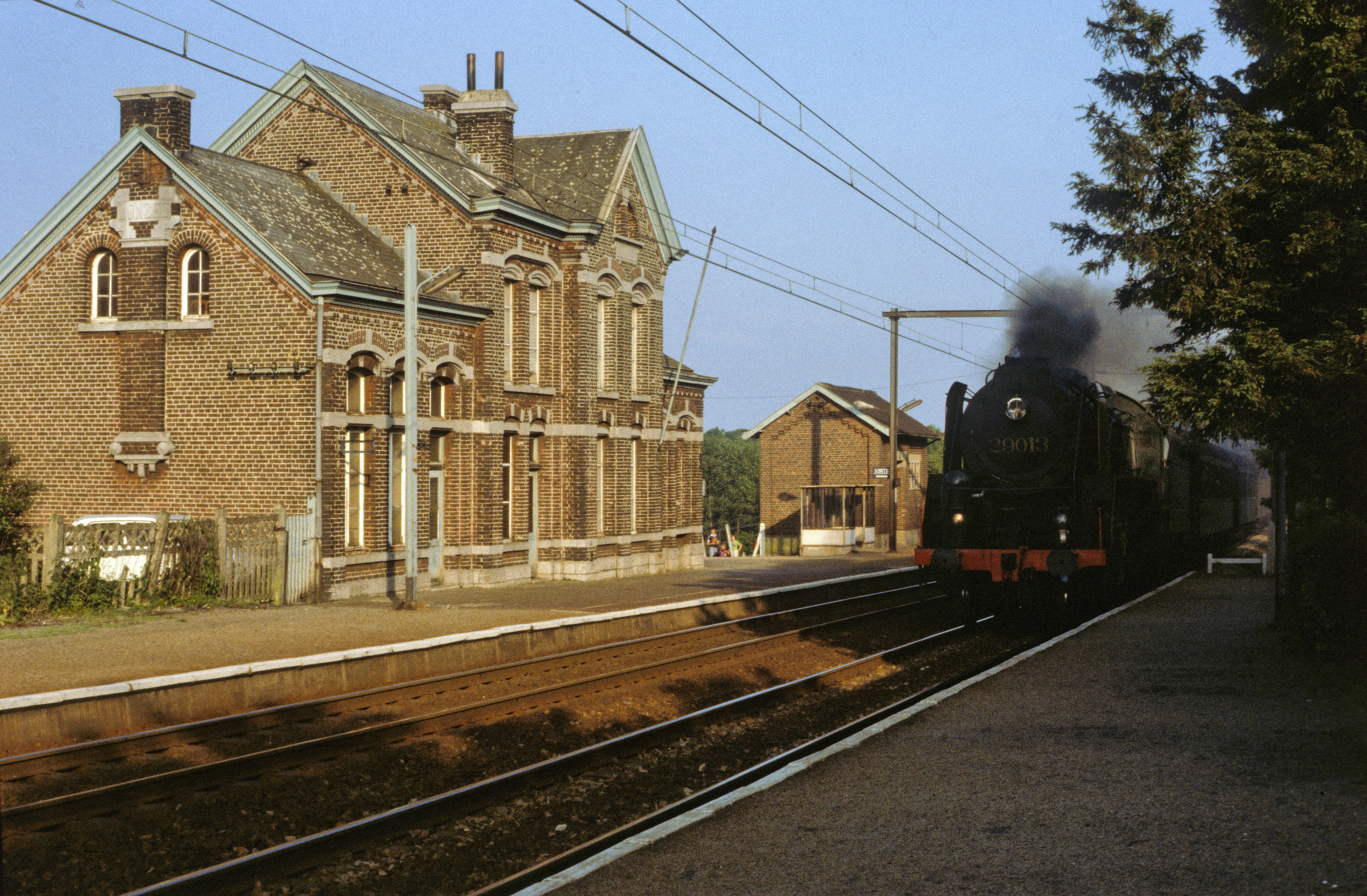
Lonzée railway station (1979)

Lonzée (French pronunciation: [lɔ̃ze]; Walloon: Lonzêye) is a village of Wallonia and a district of the municipality of Gembloux, located in the province of province of Namur, Belgium.

It was a municipality in its own right until the fusion of the Belgian municipalities in 1945.

The village is located in Hesbaye and extends along the Arton (a stream that is a tributary of the Orneau). It is located about 3 km southeast of the city of Gembloux.

== Etymology ==
In its earliest written mention (1289) the village is called Lonsees.

== History ==
Three different hamlets are mentioned in medieval sources: Harton (Arton), Argenton and Lonzée, located on the border of the Duchy of Brabant and the county of Namur. In 1357, the border between both is delimited by the Arton (Harton) which divides the village into two parts: Lonzée to the north (Duchy of Brabant) and Argenton to the south (county of Namur). This border would be disputed for a long time: conflicts and trials would come one after the other during the Ancien Régime.

During the administrative reorganisation following the collapse of the Ancien Régime, Lonzée merged with Argenton to create one municipality. The village was merged with the city of Gembloux (province of Namur) because of the policy of merging municipalities (1965).

== Economy ==
At the end of the 19th century, a unique industry emerged in Lonzée: the extraction of green earth. This involved the exploitation of a formation of Mesozoic glauconite or green clay formed during the Cretaceous (135 to 65 million years ago). This clay was used to make dyes (in Germany and Austria) and stucco once mixed with chalk coming from Grez-Doiceau. The industry came to an end during the Second World War.

== Witch country ==
In 1637 and 1638, witchcraft trials took place before the High Court justice of Gembloux. Women in Lonzée were accused of witchcraft. For an entire month, at least five women were imprisoned, questioned, tortured and convicted before being strangled and burned. Their possessions were sold to cover the costs of the trials. These sensational trials earned Lonzée the nickname of witch country.

== Heritage ==
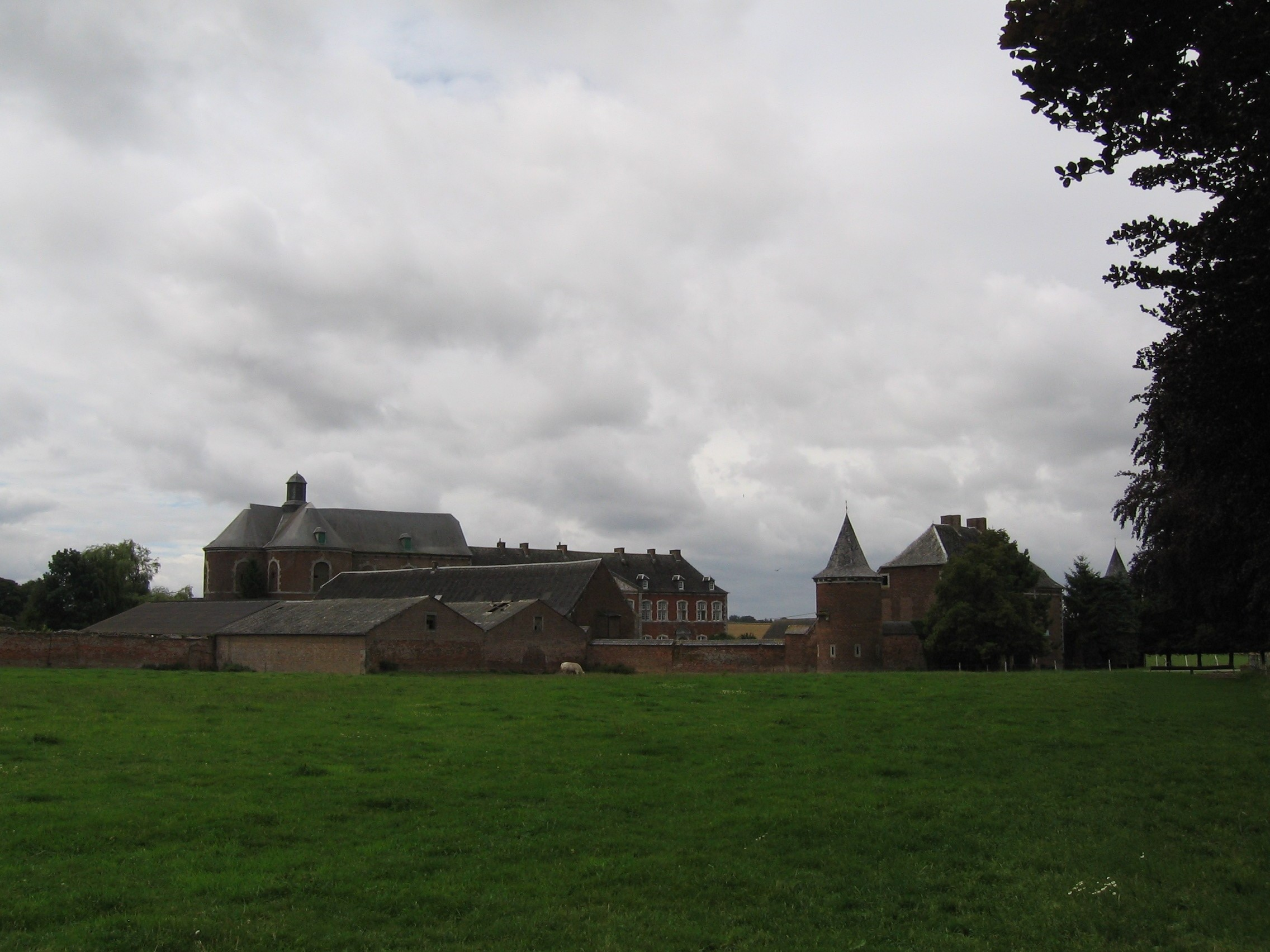
Argenton Abbey, Lonzée

The ferme d'Argenton is a former Cistercian nunnery, founded during the 13th century and abolished during the French Revolution.

The moulin d'Harton (listed building) is already referred to in the documents about the property donations to the abbaye d'Argenton in 1229. It was a flour mill, a twister and ended as a cutlery workshop from the end of the 19th century until 1929. Property of the abbaye d’Argenton, it was rebuilt in 1741 and restored in 1992.

The Saint-Roch church with its neo-Gothic architecture, its bricks, blue stones and slate roof, dates back to 1846. Before it was built, the Lonzinois went to Mass in Gembloux where their dead were buried.
