= Nassau-Corroy =

- Parent house: House of Nassau
- Founded: 16th century
- Founder: Alexis of Nassau-Corroy
- Titles: Count of Corroy; Count of Zwevegem; Baron of Warcoing; Lord of Frasnes-lez-Gosselies
- Estates: Castle of Corroy-le-Château; Zwevegem Castle
- Dissolution: 1832

Nassau-Corroy was the name of an illegitimate branch of the House of Nassau. Unlike the main branch of the House of Nassau, the branch of Nassau-Corroy was Roman Catholic and faithful to the king of Spain.

== History ==
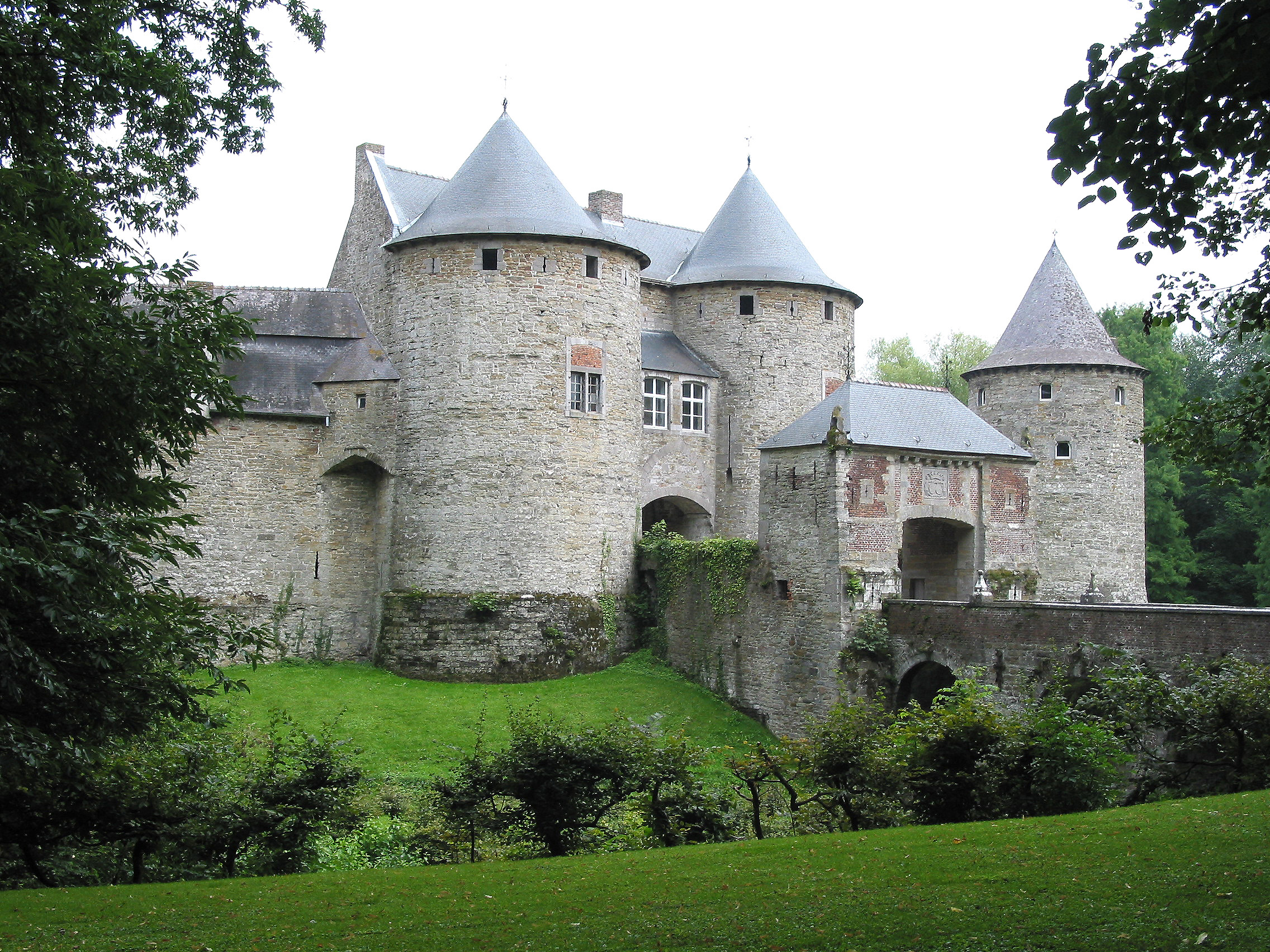
Castle of Corroy-le-Château

The history of the branch of Nassau-Corroy was started by the marriage between Otto II of Nassau-Siegen and Adelaide of Vianden. The counts of Vianden had built the Castle of Corroy-le-Château in the 13th century. Thus, the ancestors of Henry III of Nassau-Breda already possessed the rights of the castle in Corroy.

The branch of Nassau-Corroy was founded by Alexis of Nassau-Corroy, the bastard son of Henry III of Nassau-Breda and his mistress Elisabeth Claire van Rosenbach. In 1530, Alexis was recognised by emperor Charles V. In 1540, René of Chalon gave the full rights of Corroy to his half-brother. In 1545, the branch was openly recognised by the Prince of Orange.

In 1693, Charles II of Spain granted Joseph-Ignace the title of Count of Corroy. In 1717, the Counts of Corroy added Zwevegem to their possessions and were the last feudal lords in Zwevegem. The familial arms are still the official coat of arms of the municipality of Zwevegem.

== Lords and Counts of Corroy ==
Alexis I of Nassau-Corroy: legitimised bastard in 1530.
Married to Wilhelmina of Bronkhorst Batenburg (1526 - 1601)

  1. René of Nassau-Corroy
    1. Alexis II of Nassau-Corroy
      1. Maximilien of Nassau-Corroy
        1. Joseph-Ignace de Nassau, 1st Count of Corroy;
          acquired the castle of Zwevegem and the title of Count of Zwevegem;
          married to Marrie-Anne, daughter of Philippe I Alexandre de Ghistelles, 2nd Marquess of Saint-Floris.
          1. Guillaume-Adrien-Joseph de Nassau, Count of Corroy
            son of Joseph-Ignace, succeeded his father in 1740
            1. Alexandre-Constantin-Joseph de Nassau, Count of Corroy (1738-1804)
              son of Guillaume-Adrien; he was the last count of Zwevegem

== Others ==
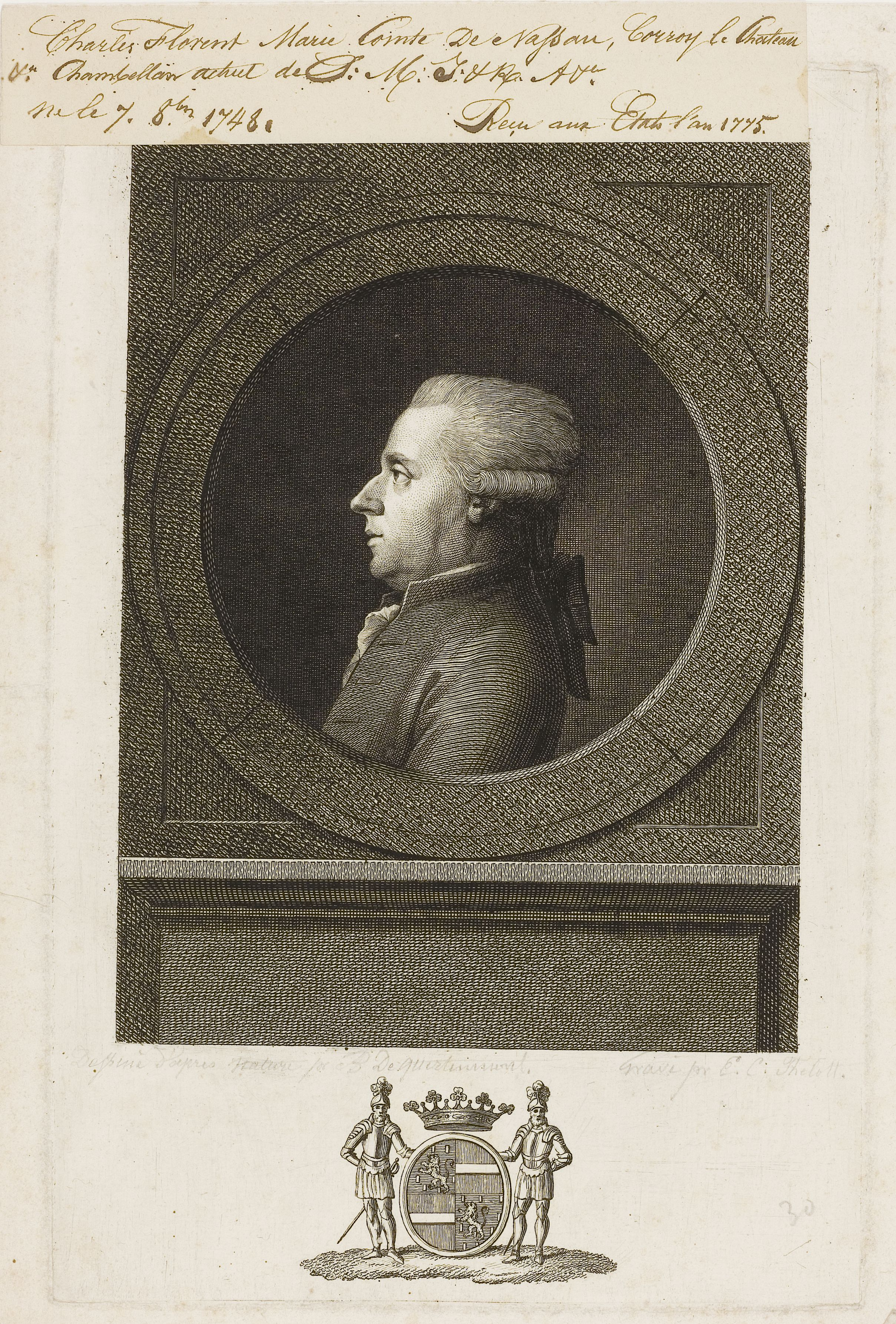
Charles Florent Marie, the last male scion of the noble family Nassau-Conroy

- Charles-Florent-Marie de Nassau, Count of Corroy, younger brother of Alexandre, died in 1809
- Amélie-Constance-Marie de Nassau-Corroy, daughter and only descendant of Charles, married in 1803 Gillion, the Marquess of Trazegnies d'Ittre, who inherited the castle of Corroy. The death of Amélie in 1832 signified the end of the noble family of Nassau-Corroy.
