= List of protected heritage sites in Gembloux =

This table shows an overview of the protected heritage sites in the Walloon town Gembloers, or Gembloux. This list is part of Belgium's national heritage.

Object	Year/architect	Town/section	Address	Coordinates	Number^{?}	Image
Church of Saint-Guibert, old abbey church ^{(nl)} ^{(fr)}		Gembloux	Gembloux	50.561502°N 4.694198°E	92142-CLT-0001-01 Info	
Chapel of La Chapelle-Dieu ^{(nl)} ^{(fr)}		Gembloux	Gembloux	50.557968°N 4.699181°E	92142-CLT-0002-01 Info	Kapel: La Chapelle-Dieu
Some parts of the agricultural institute: older parts, the old abbey farm, the wall outside the main entrance of the institute, a remnant of the ramparts of the 12th century, the bell-tower of the old parish church located in the rectory garden, and the two arcades located beside the church. ^{(nl)} ^{(fr)}		Gembloux	Gembloux	50.560796°N 4.692988°E	92142-CLT-0005-01 Info	Bepaalde delen van het landbouwinstituut: oudere delen, de oude abdijhoeve, de muur buiten de hoofdingang van het instituut, een overblijfsel van de wallen van de 12e eeuw, de belfort-toren van de oude parochiekerk, gelegen in de pastorietuin, en de twee arcades gelegen naast de kerk.
Building called "Reposoir" ^{(nl)} ^{(fr)}		Gembloux	Gembloux-sur-Orneau	50.561484°N 4.696760°E	92142-CLT-0006-01 Info	
Church of Notre Dame ^{(nl)} ^{(fr)}		Gembloux	Bossières	50.518363°N 4.697223°E	92142-CLT-0007-01 Info	
Castle of Corroy-le-Château ^{(nl)} ^{(fr)}		Gembloux		50.532846°N 4.656215°E	92142-CLT-0008-01 Info	Kasteel van Corroy-le-Château
Ensemble of the medieval castle, its park and valley of the Ruisseau ^{(nl)} ^{(fr)}		Gembloux	Corroy-le-Château	50.532888°N 4.652286°E	92142-CLT-0009-01 Info	Ensemble van het middeleeuwse kasteel, diens park en vallei van de Ruisseau
Church of Saint-Lambert ^{(nl)} ^{(fr)}		Gembloux	Corroy-le-Château	50.535848°N 4.654531°E	92142-CLT-0010-01 Info	Kerk Saint-Lambert
Ensemble of the church of Saint-Lambert, the graveyard around it with its surrounding wall and the chestnut trees growing in the front of the building ^{(nl)} ^{(fr)}		Gembloux	Corroy-le-Château	50.535964°N 4.654188°E	92142-CLT-0011-01 Info	
The Presbytery of Grand-Leez ^{(nl)} ^{(fr)}		Gembloux		50.581660°N 4.765324°E	92142-CLT-0012-01 Info	
The windmill Defrenne ^{(nl)} ^{(fr)}		Gembloux	Grand-Leez	50.575059°N 4.766759°E	92142-CLT-0013-01 Info	De windmolen Defrenne
Castle farm of Falnuée and the ensemble of the castle and surrounding areas ^{(nl)} ^{(fr)}		Gembloux		50.503778°N 4.670343°E	92142-CLT-0014-01 Info	Kasteelhoeve van Falnuée en het ensemble vand e kasteelhoeve en de omliggende terreinen
Tower of the church of Saint-Foy, and the ensemble of the tower, the platform, the remains of the old cemetery, and the adjacent esplanade with linden trees ^{(nl)} ^{(fr)}		Gembloux	Sauvenière	50.581104°N 4.725072°E	92142-CLT-0015-01 Info	Toren van de kerk Saint-Foy, en het ensemble van de toren, het bordes, resten van het oude kerkhof, de aangrenzende esplanade met lindebomen
Chapel of Saints Pierre et Paul ^{(nl)} ^{(fr)}		Gembloux	Grand-Manil	50.555848°N 4.678077°E	92142-CLT-0020-01 Info	Kapel van Saints Pierre et Paul
Former Abbey Argenton namely the porch with the outbuildings and two corner towers, the abbey district, the facades and roofs of the abbey church and the paving of the courtyard and the ensemble of the abbey and surrounding areas ^{(nl)} ^{(fr)}		Gembloux		50.551135°N 4.739790°E	92142-CLT-0021-01 Info	
East Wing with the barns and stables of the Abbey of Argenton, and the interior of the abbey church ^{(nl)} ^{(fr)}		Gembloux	Lonzée	50.551159°N 4.739370°E	92142-CLT-0022-01 Info	Oostvleugel met de stallen en paardenstallen van de abdij van Argenton, en het interieur van de abdijkerk
Facades and roofs of the buildings of the castle of Liroux, and the ensemble of buildings and surrounding areas ^{(nl)} ^{(fr)}		Gembloux	Sauvenière	50.566619°N 4.734617°E	92142-CLT-0023-01 Info	
Arton Mill and its surroundings, setting conservation ^{(nl)} ^{(fr)}		Gembloux	Lonzée	50.557080°N 4.741970°E	92142-CLT-0024-01 Info	
Facades and roofs of the castle of Montmiel ^{(nl)} ^{(fr)}		Gembloux	Onoz	50.497790°N 4.672395°E	92142-CLT-0025-01 Info	
Facades and roofs of the buildings of the old abbey adjacent to the courtyard, consisting of entrance porch, the Prelature and outbuildings and the "Belfry" tower of the old parish church included in the classification of the old abbey ^{(nl)} ^{(fr)}		Gembloux		50.560796°N 4.692988°E	92142-PEX-0001-01 Info	Gevels en daken van de gebouwen van de oude abdij aangrenzend aan de binnenplaats, bestaande uit veranda van de entree, de prelatuur en bijgebouwen en de "beffroi"-toren van de oude parochiekerk opgenomen in de classificatie van de oude abdij
Castle Corroy-le-Château ^{(nl)} ^{(fr)}		Gembloux		50.532846°N 4.656215°E	92142-PEX-0002-01 Info	Kasteel van Corroy-le-Château
windmill Defrenne ^{(nl)} ^{(fr)}		Gembloux		50.575059°N 4.766759°E	92142-PEX-0003-01 Info	Windmolen Defrenne

== See also ==
- List of protected heritage sites in Namur (province)
- Gembloux
