= Trazegnies Castle =

Castle in Wallonia, Belgium

Coordinates: 50.4614°N 4.330°E

- Trazegnies, Province of Hainaut
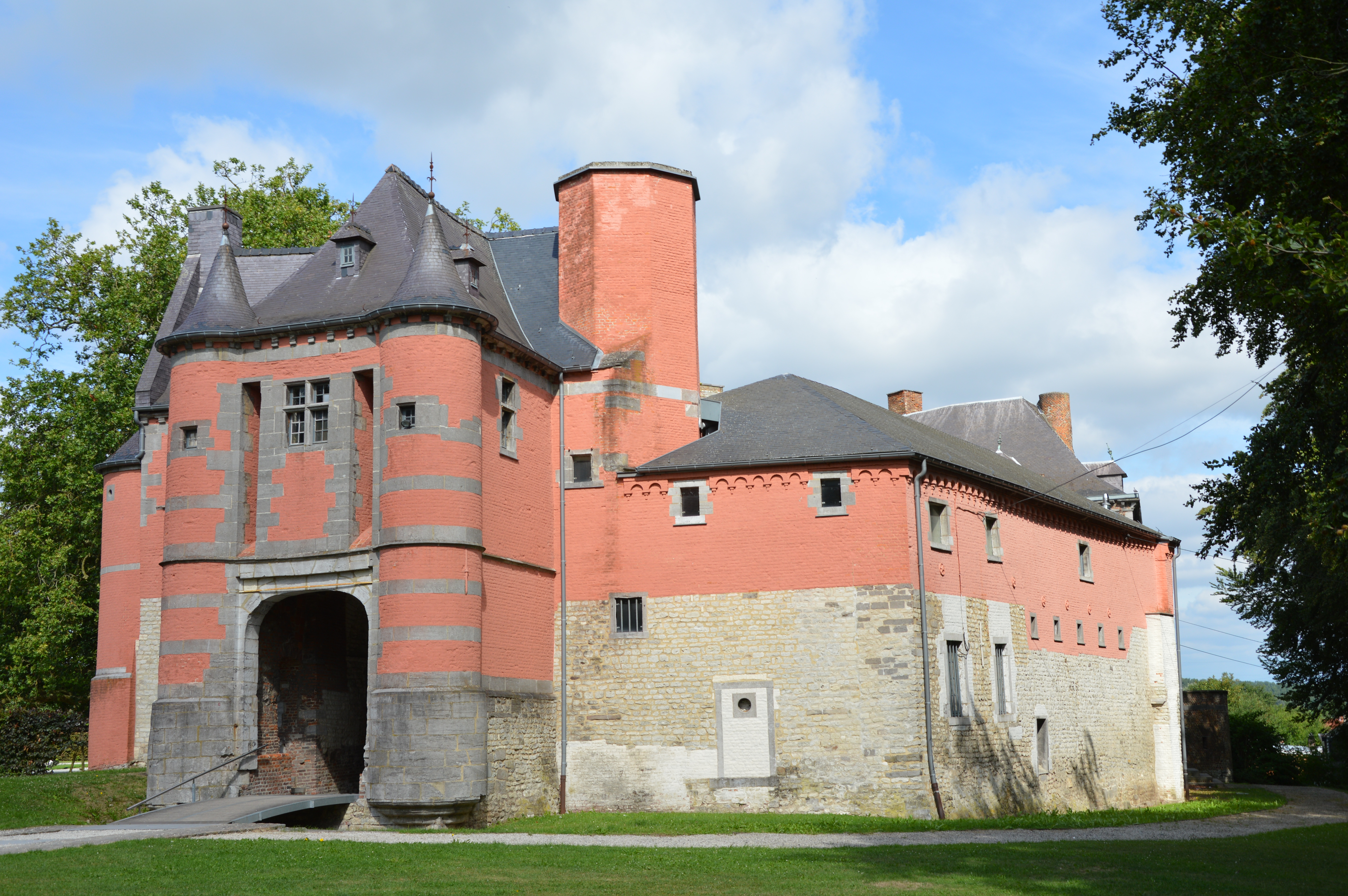
- View of the surviving portions of Trazegnies Castle at the north-west

Site information
- Type: Castle
- Controlled by: "Friends of Trazegnies Castle" (Les Amis du Château de Trazegnies)
- Open to the public: Yes
- Condition: Partially ruined

Trazegnies Castle (French: Château de Trazegnies) is a castle located in Trazegnies, Courcelles in the Belgian province of Hainaut.

== History ==
Trazegnies was originally a powerful independent seigneurie on the edges of the Duchy of Brabant, the County of Hainaut and the Prince-Bishopric of Liège and was ruled by a separate dynasty. The original castle was built by Gilles I in the 11th century but was almost completely destroyed in 1554 by the armies of Henry II of France during the Italian War of 1551–1559. Subsequently rebuilt, a corps de logis was added to the castle by Gillion-Othon de Trazegnies in the Louis XIII style in the 17th century.

The extinction of the Trazegnies dynasty led to the sale of the castle to a coal mine which partitioned off its land, leaving the castle itself to the Belgian state. It had become derelict by 1926 and suffered severe damage from subsidence as a result of underground mining. However, a civic association called the "Friends of Trazegnies Castle" (Les Amis du Château de Trazegnies) successfully opposed its destruction and began a gradual programme of restoration with the support of the Walloon Region. The castle is currently open to the public on designated days.

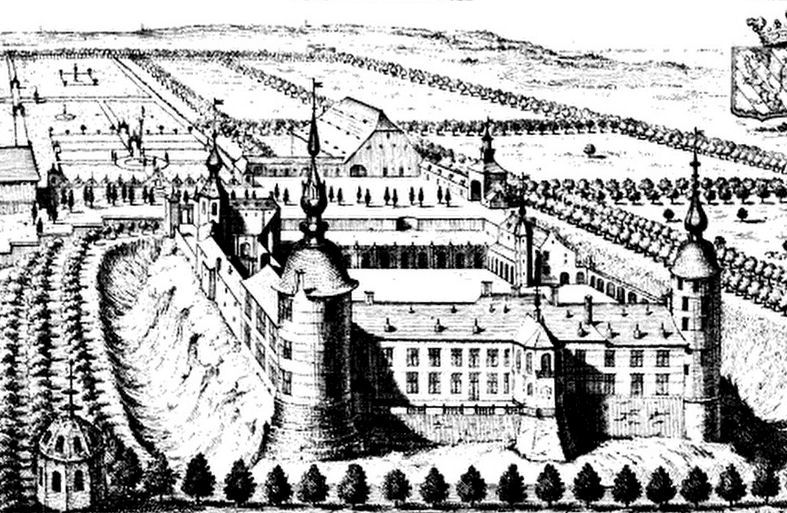
Depiction of the castle in Brabantia Illustrata (1705) looking northwards

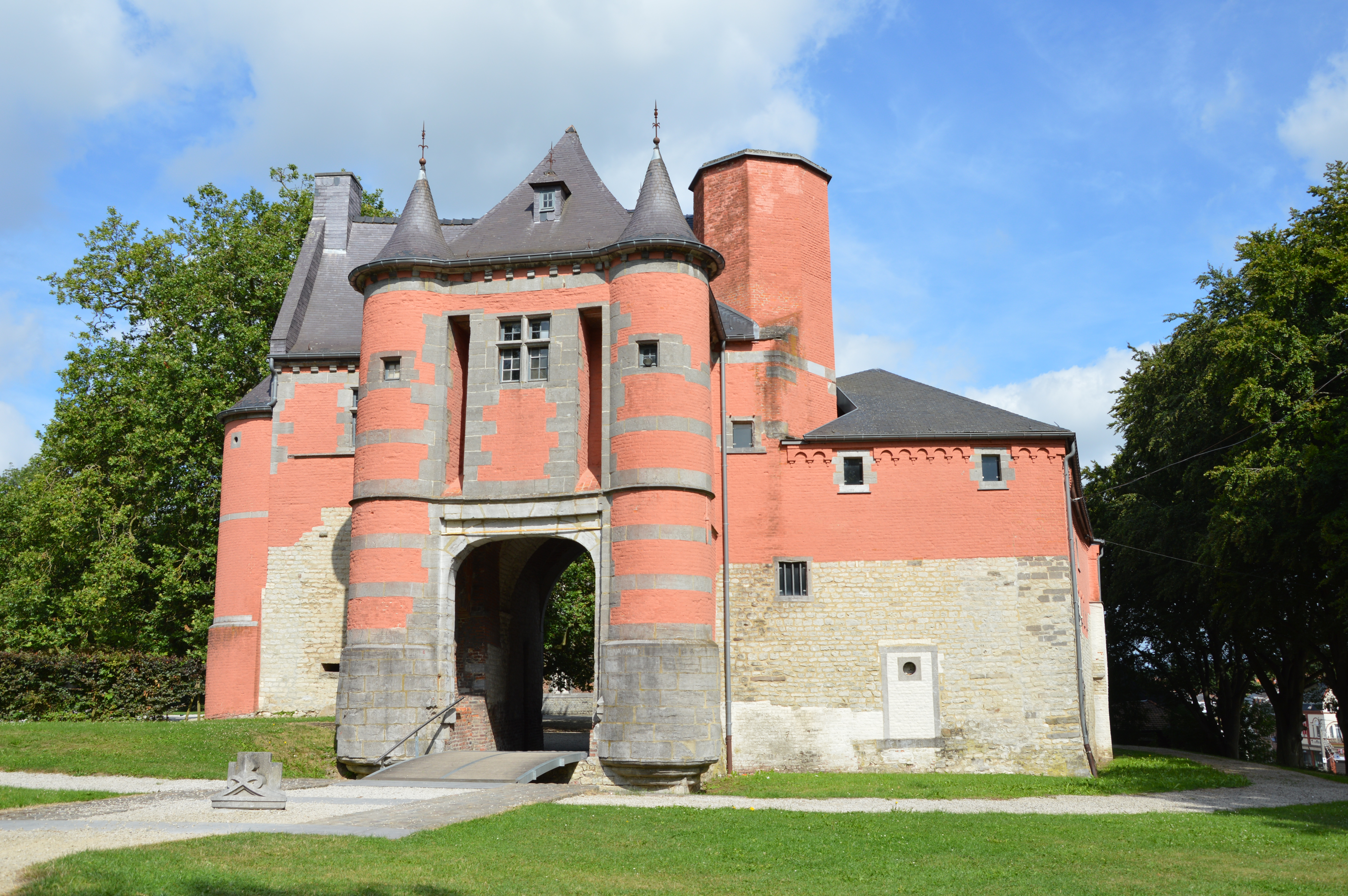
View of the gatehouse on the north side

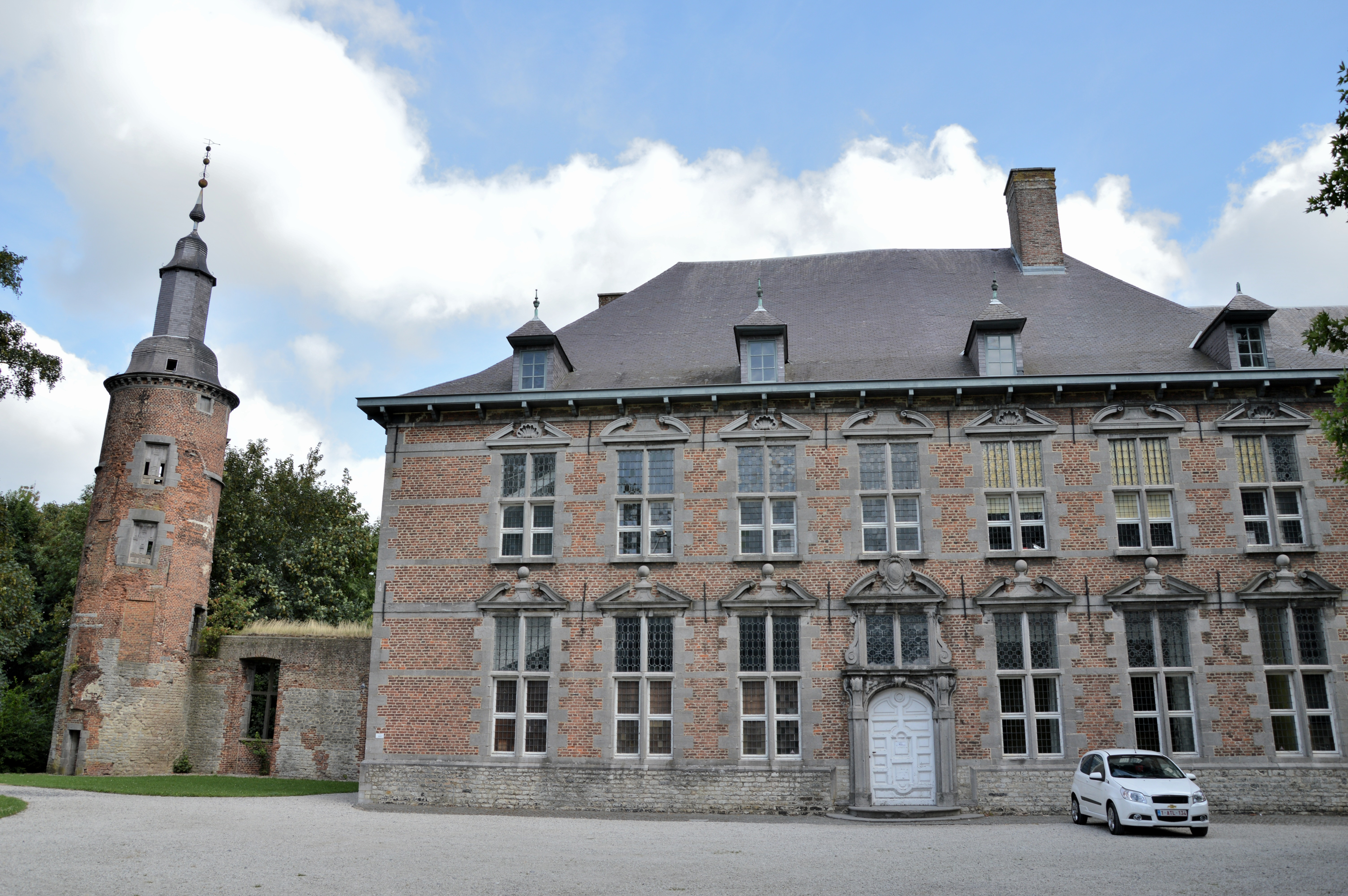
Modern view of the 17th-century corps de logis and south-east tower

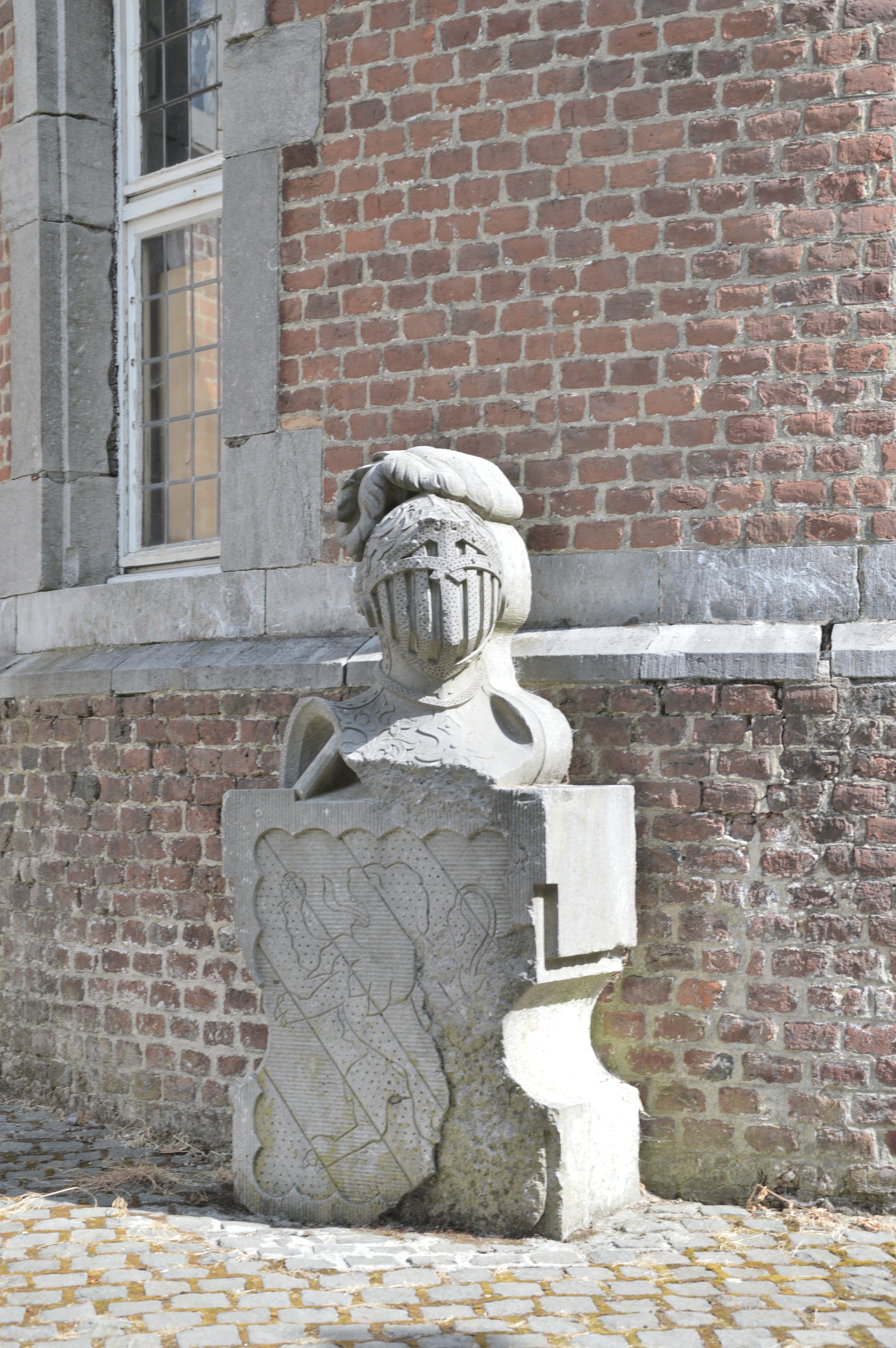
Coat of arms of the Trazegnies family

== See also ==
- List of castles in Belgium
- Marquess of Trazegnies d'Ittre
