= Oliver Rendell Arton =

Bermudian politician

Oliver Rendell Arton (29 March 1916 or 1920 – 4 February 2011) was a Bermudian banker and politician who served as a justice of the peace and member of the Parliament of Bermuda. He was born in Hamilton, Bermuda, the son of Dr. Ogilvie Airlie Arton and Isabel Rendell, and educated in Toronto. He was one of the founders of the United Bermuda Party. Arton died on 4 February 2011.
