= Trazegnies, Belgium =

Village of Wallonia, Belgium

Coordinates: 50°28′N 4°18′E

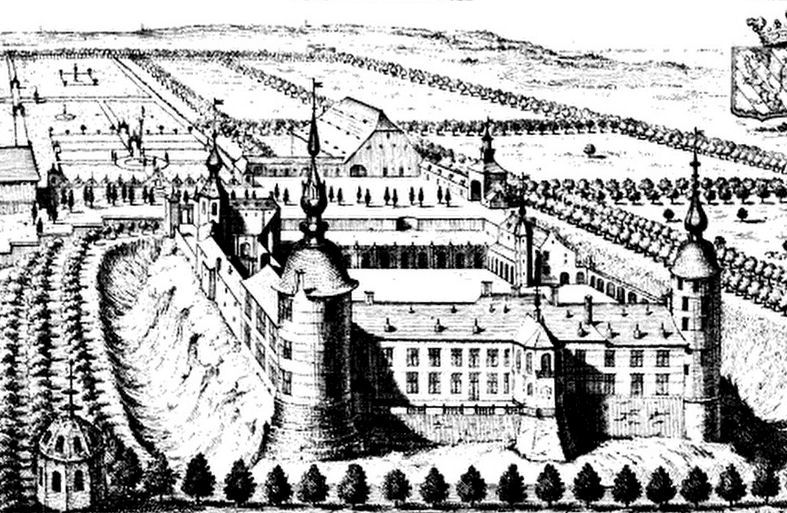
Trazegnies Castle, engraving

Trazegnies (Walloon: Trejhniye) is a town of Wallonia and a district of the municipality of Courcelles, located in the province of Hainaut, Belgium.

Having merged with the municipality in 1976, it is located halfway between Charleroi and La Louvière. A former mining area, it is the location of Trazegnies Castle.

Trazegnies gives its name to the Marquess of Trazegnies d'Ittre.
