= Philippe Wolfers =

Belgian silversmith, jeweler, sculptor, medallist and designer

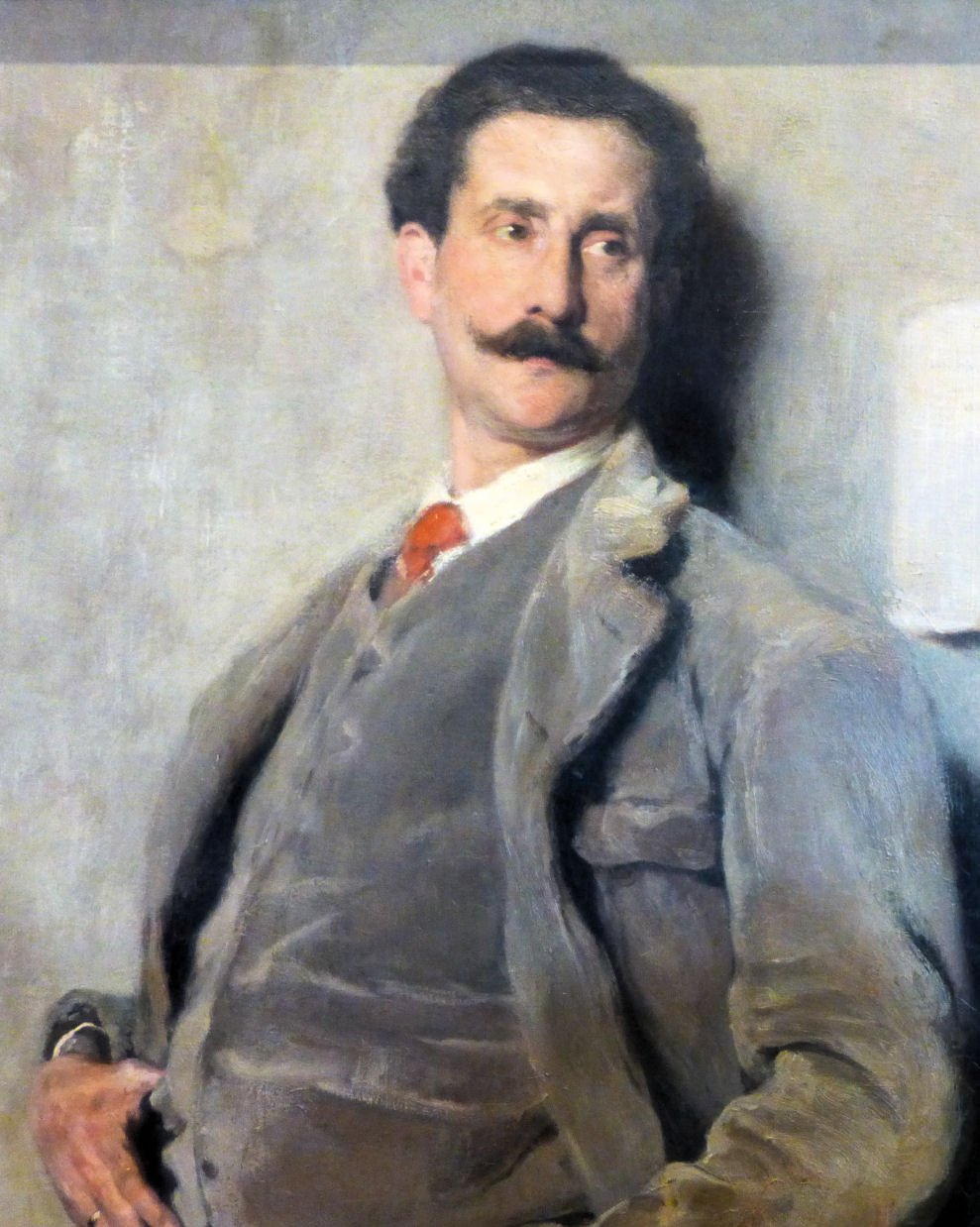
- Born: 16 April 1858
- Died: 13 December 1929 (aged 71); City of Brussels
- Alma mater: Royal Academy of Fine Arts
- Occupation: Jewelry designer, medalist, visual artist
- Parent(s): Louis Wolfers

Philippe Wolfers (16 April 1858 – 13 December 1929) was a Belgian silversmith, jeweler, sculptor, medallist and designer. His mature work belongs to the Art Nouveau style, while in his later years his work aligned with Art Deco. As a jewel designer, he was less prolific than his French contemporary René Lalique. Nevertheless his "exemplaire unique" series of jewelry is among the finest jewelry created in Art Nouveau. Wolfers is also known for his sculptures, decorative objects and tableware executed in precious materials such as silver, bronze, ivory and marble. He also designed vases and objects in glass and faience.

== Early life and education ==
Philippe Wolfers was the son of Louis Wolfers (1820–1892) who led the family firm "Wolfers frères", silversmith and court jeweler in Brussels. The young man entered the family business as an apprentice in 1875. He studied sculpture at the Royal Academy of Fine Arts in Brussels and with Isidore De Rudder. With his father, Philippe undertook many study trips through Europe, visiting the world exhibitions in Vienna (1873) and Paris (1889). Like many of his contemporaries, he was influenced by Japanese art. Inspired by the influx of Japanese art in Europe during the 1870s, Wolfers transitioned from stiff, ornamental designs to more realistic portrayals of nature, integrating Japanese aesthetics into his work.

== Design director at "Wolfers frères" ==
After the death of his father in 1892, Philippe Wolfers, with his brothers Max and Robert, took over the family firm and became its design director. In this role, he introduced silverware in an avant-garde Art Nouveau style, such as the Orchidées ("Orchids") fruit bowl from 1894 and one of his vases from around 1896 exhibited at the Metropolitan Museum of Art in New York City. During this period, he began incorporating organic materials like ivory, carnelian, opal, and tourmaline, with artisans skillfully carving these into intricate floral and animal forms, which became a signature of his unique Art Nouveau creations.

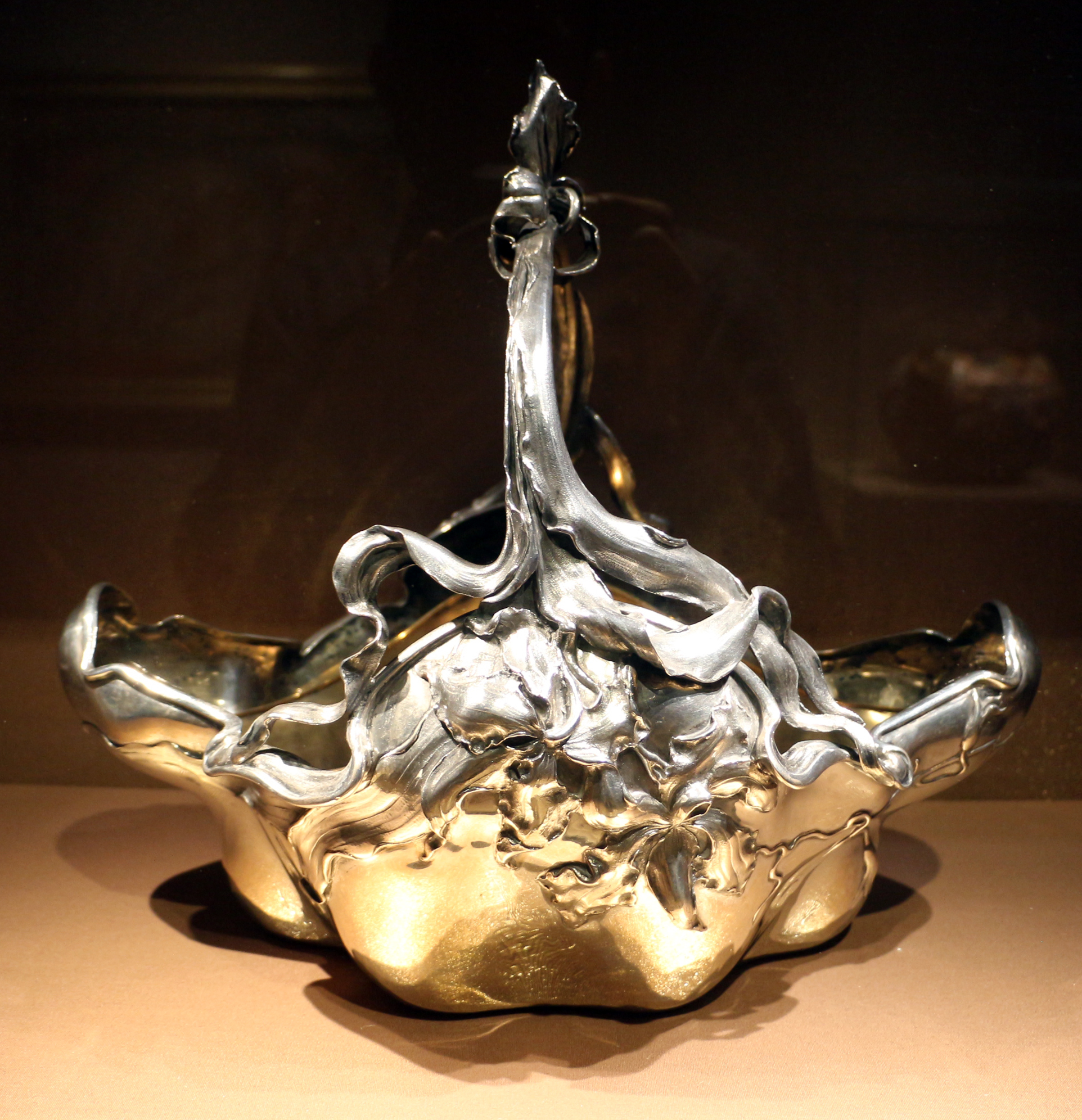
Orchidées ("Orchids") fruit bowl, silver (1894)

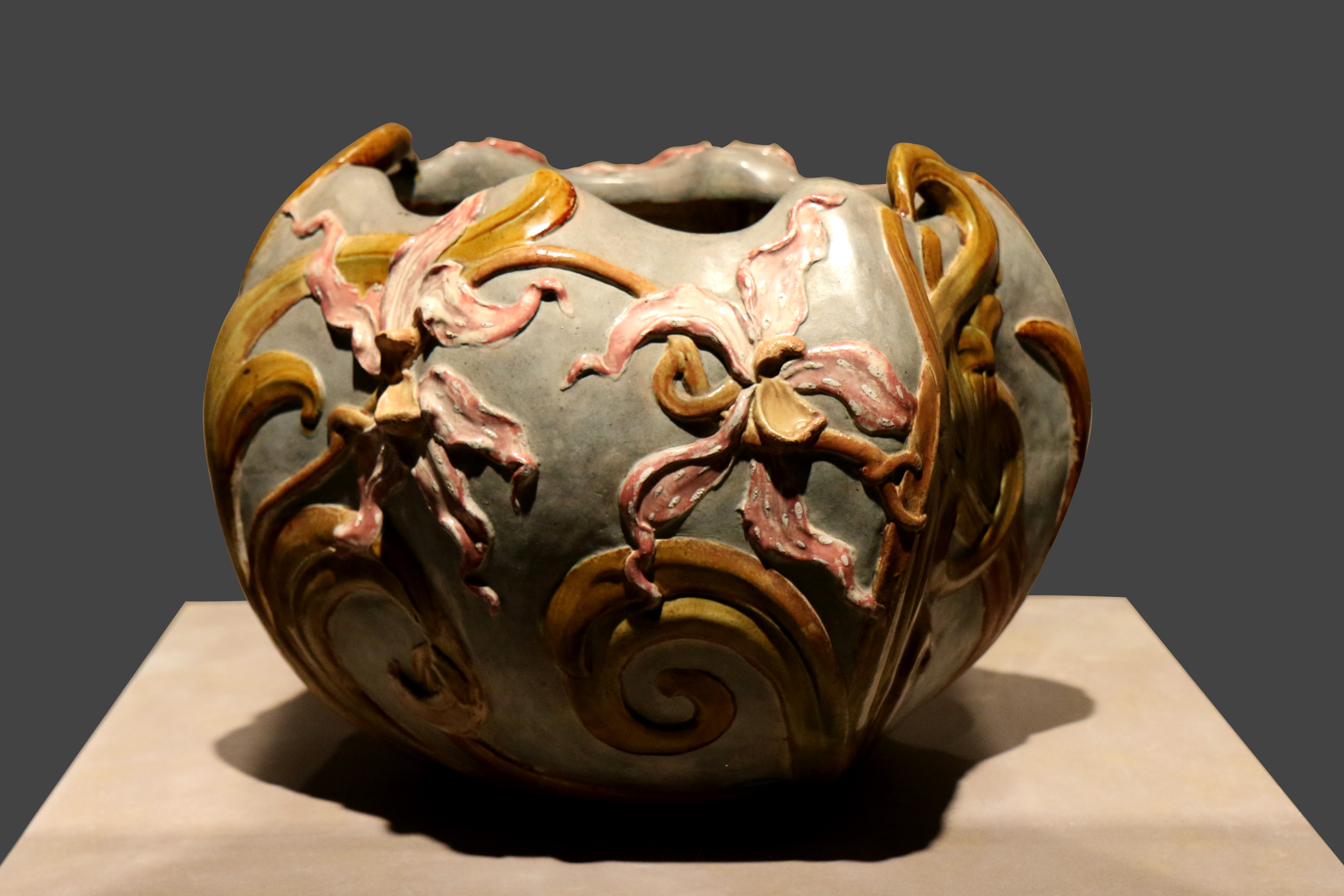
Orchidée ("Orchid") flower pot, glazed earthenware (1897)

== Wolfers' "exemplaires uniques" ==
Between 1898 and 1907, Wolfers produced some 130 unique pieces of jewelry. Each piece was inscribed with the words EX.UNIQUE (for "exemplaire unique") and his initials. They were intended to show the artist's craftsmanship and were submitted to important national and international exhibitions. These unique jewels were already extremely expensive at the time. Pieces that remained unsold were disassembled after some time and the precious metals and gemstones were reused to make new pieces of jewelry. This makes this type of exclusive jewelry extremely rare today. Only about 20 pieces still exist. One of his "ex. unique" brooches sold for over £23,000 at a Bonhams auction in 2012. The Glycines choker which he created for the Paris World's Fair in 1900 was sold at Christie's Geneva in 2016 for 257,000 CHF.

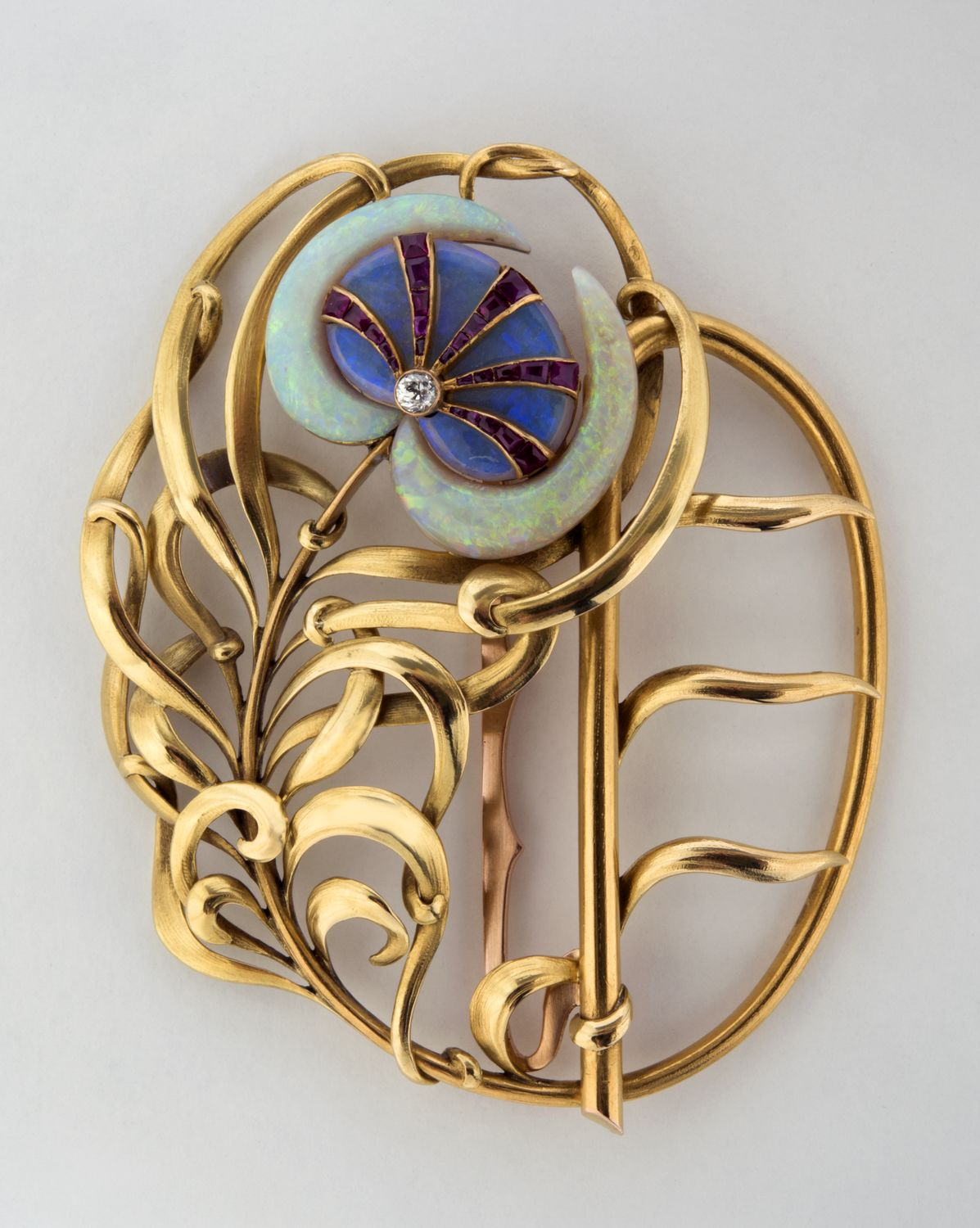
Plumes de Paon ("Peacock Feathers"), belt buckle by Wolfers (1898)

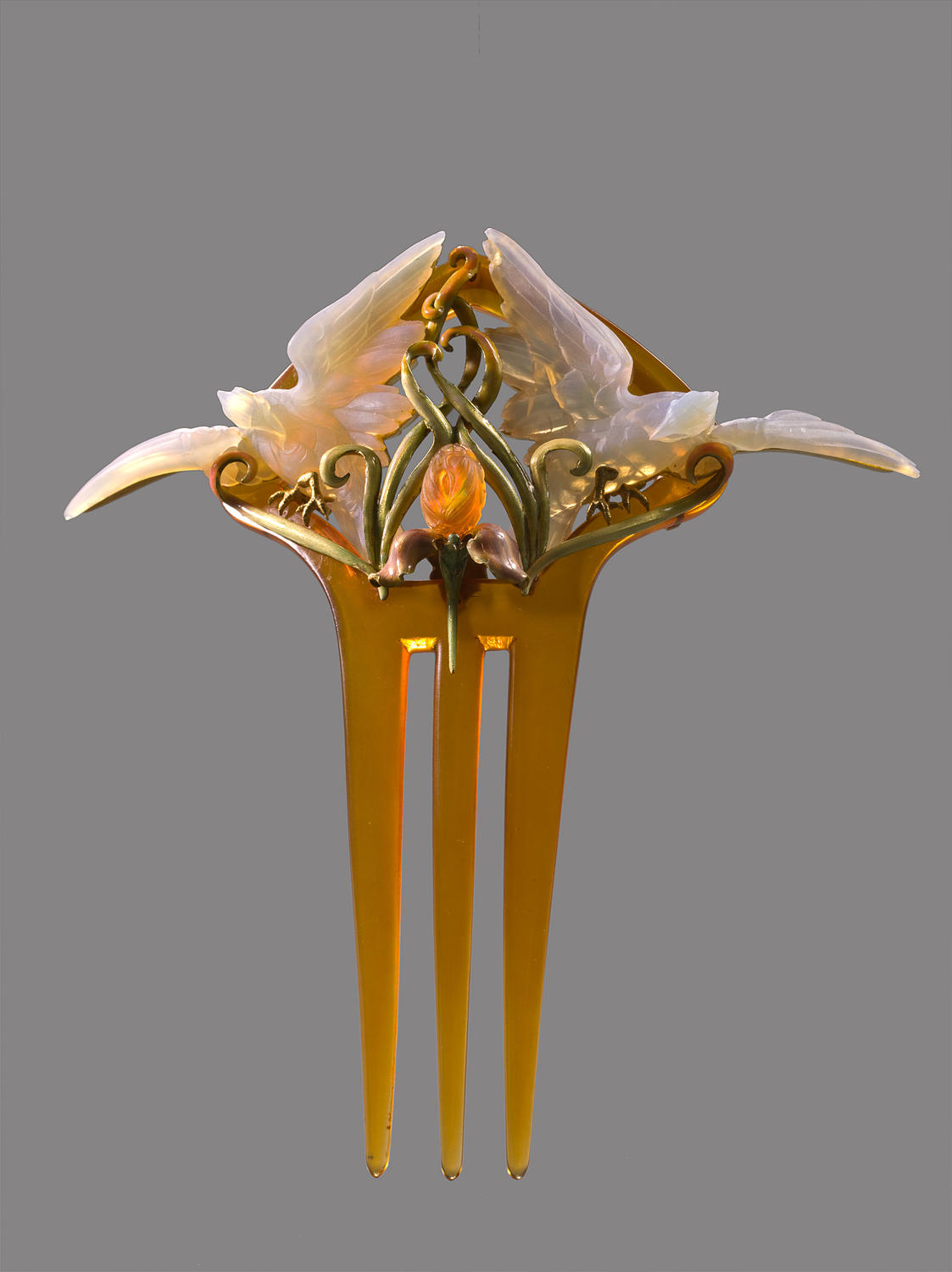
Oiseaux et Iris ("Birds and Iris") decorative hair comb (1899)

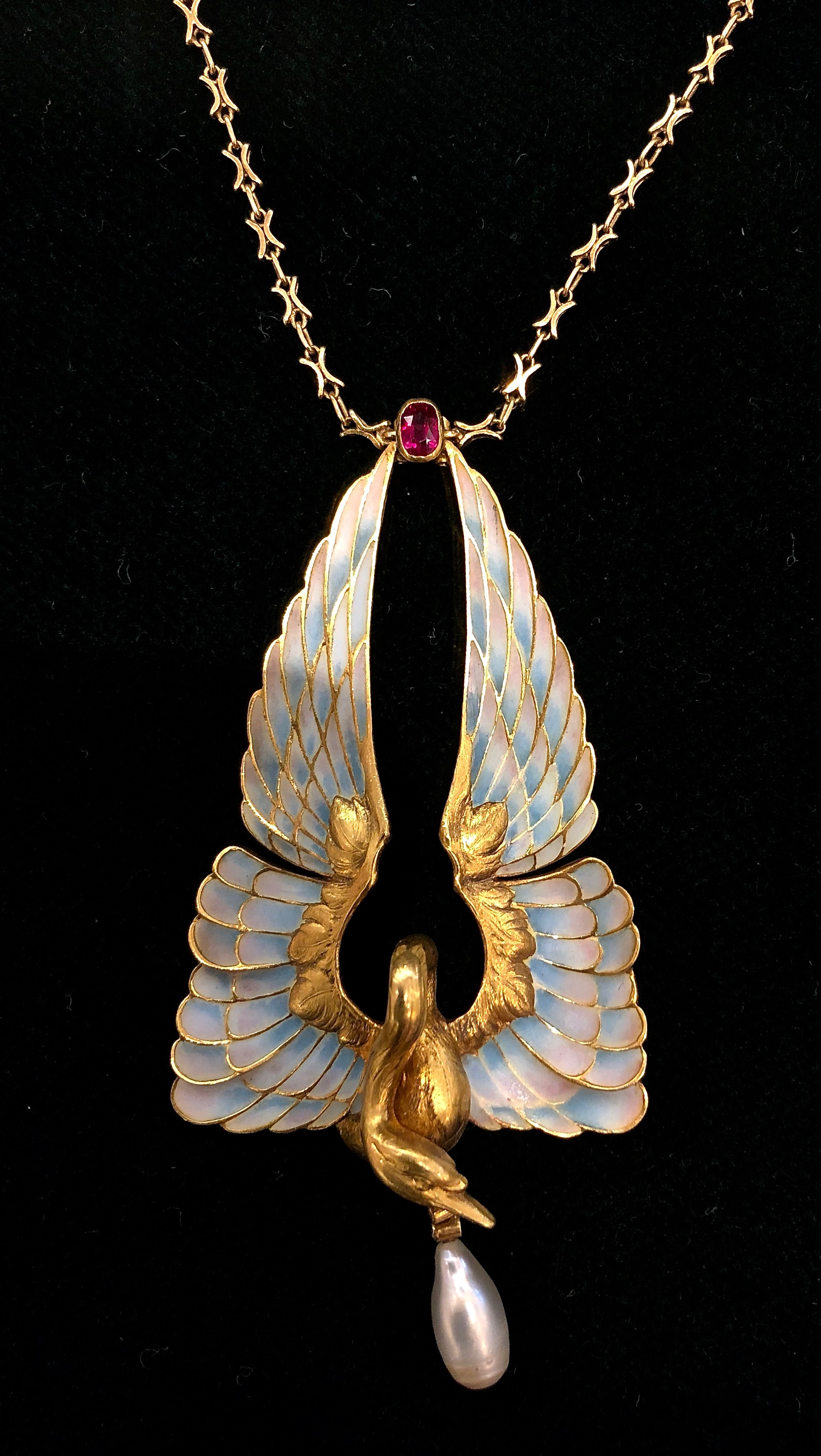
Swan pendant (1901)

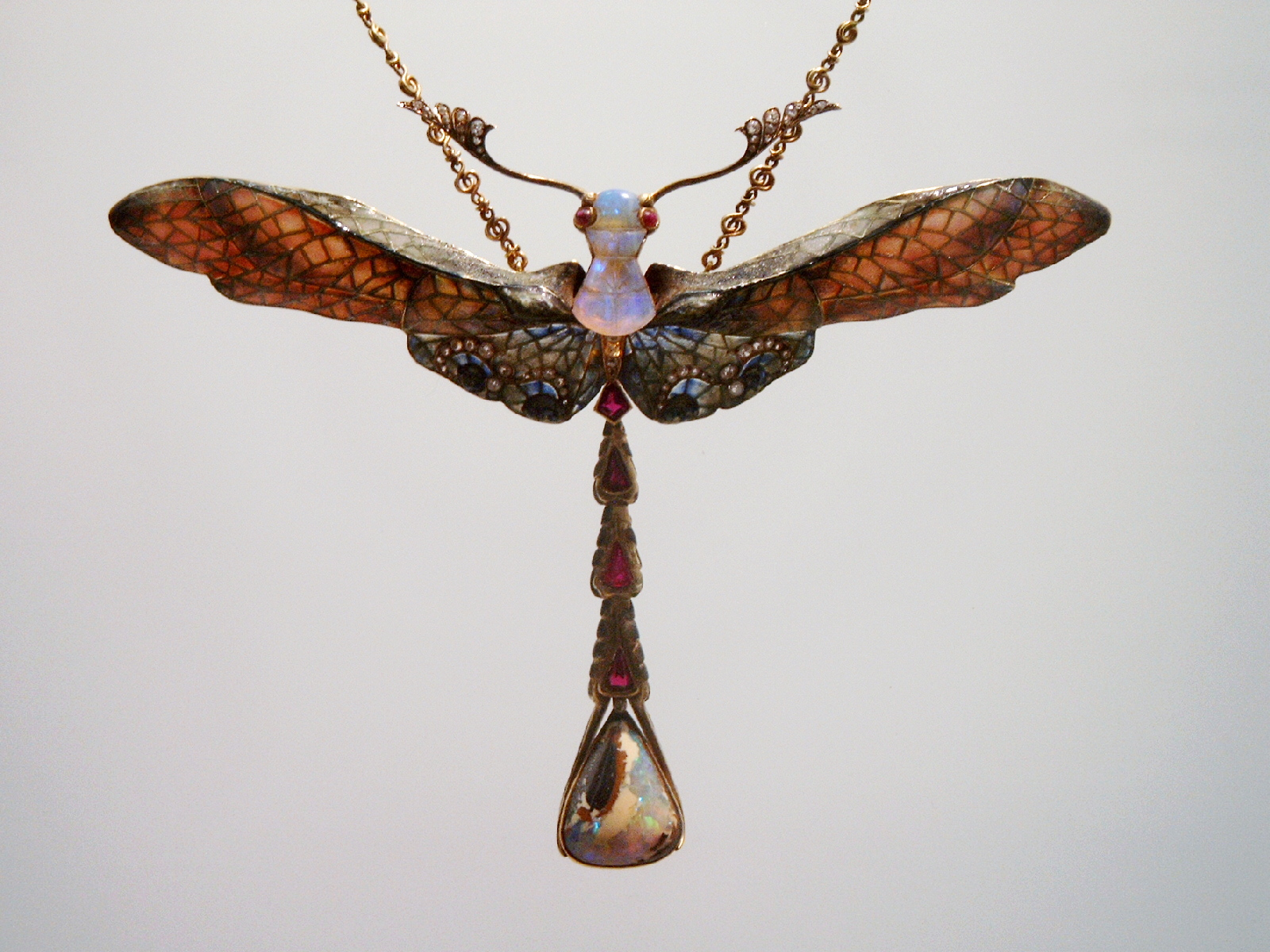
Libelle ("Dragonfly"), pendant made of gold, opal, enamel, rubies and diamonds (1902)

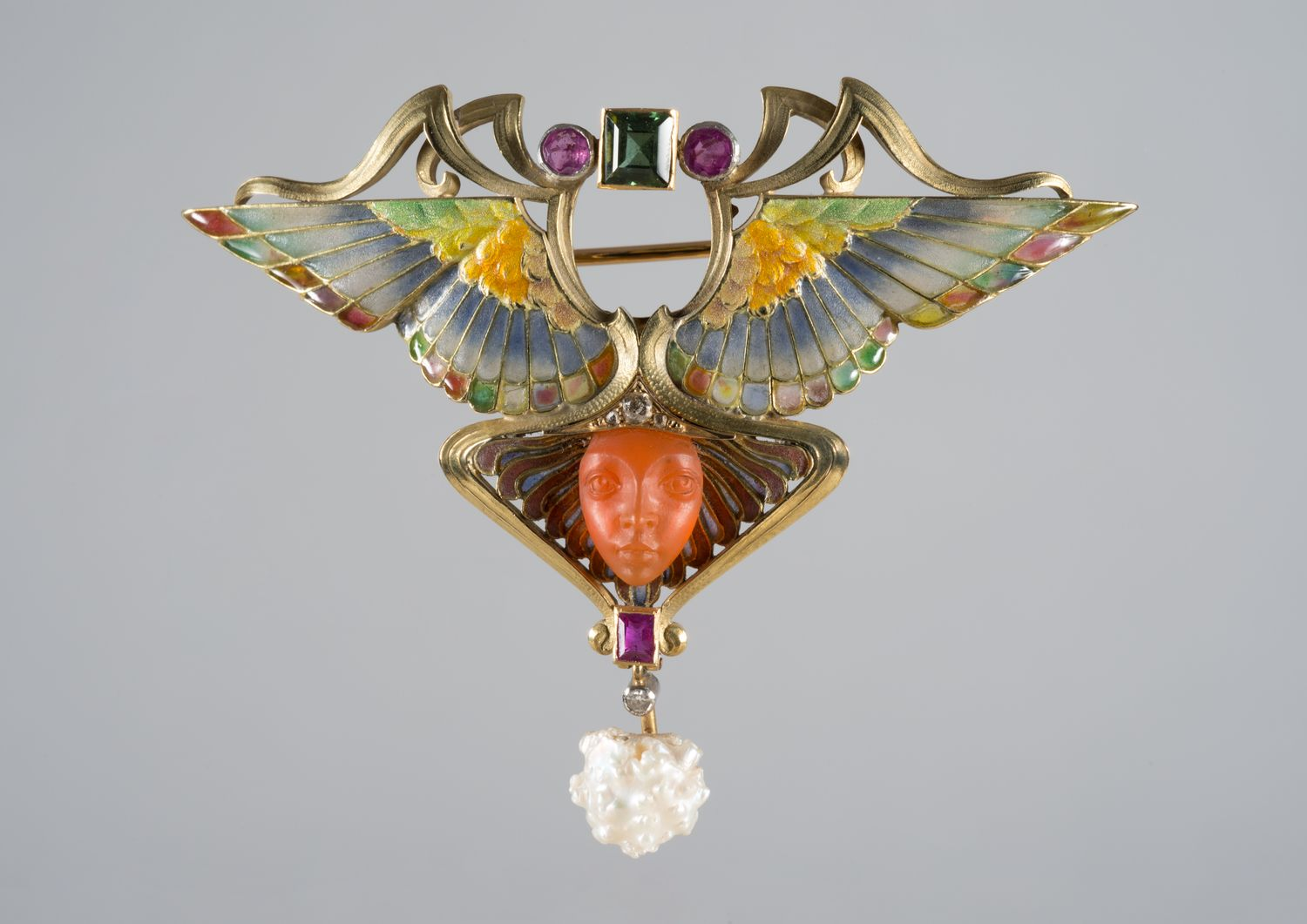
Niké brooch (1902)

== Honours ==
- 1923 : commander in the Order of the Crown.
