= Marquess of Trazegnies d'Ittre =

Member of the Belgian nobility

Écartelé : aux I et IV, bandé d'or et d'azur, à l'ombre de lion, brochant sur le tout, à la bordure engrêlée de gueules (qui est Trazegnies); aux II et III, de gueules, à la fasce d'argent, accompagnée de trois losanges d'or (qui est de Wissocq)

Coat of the Noble House of Trazegnies

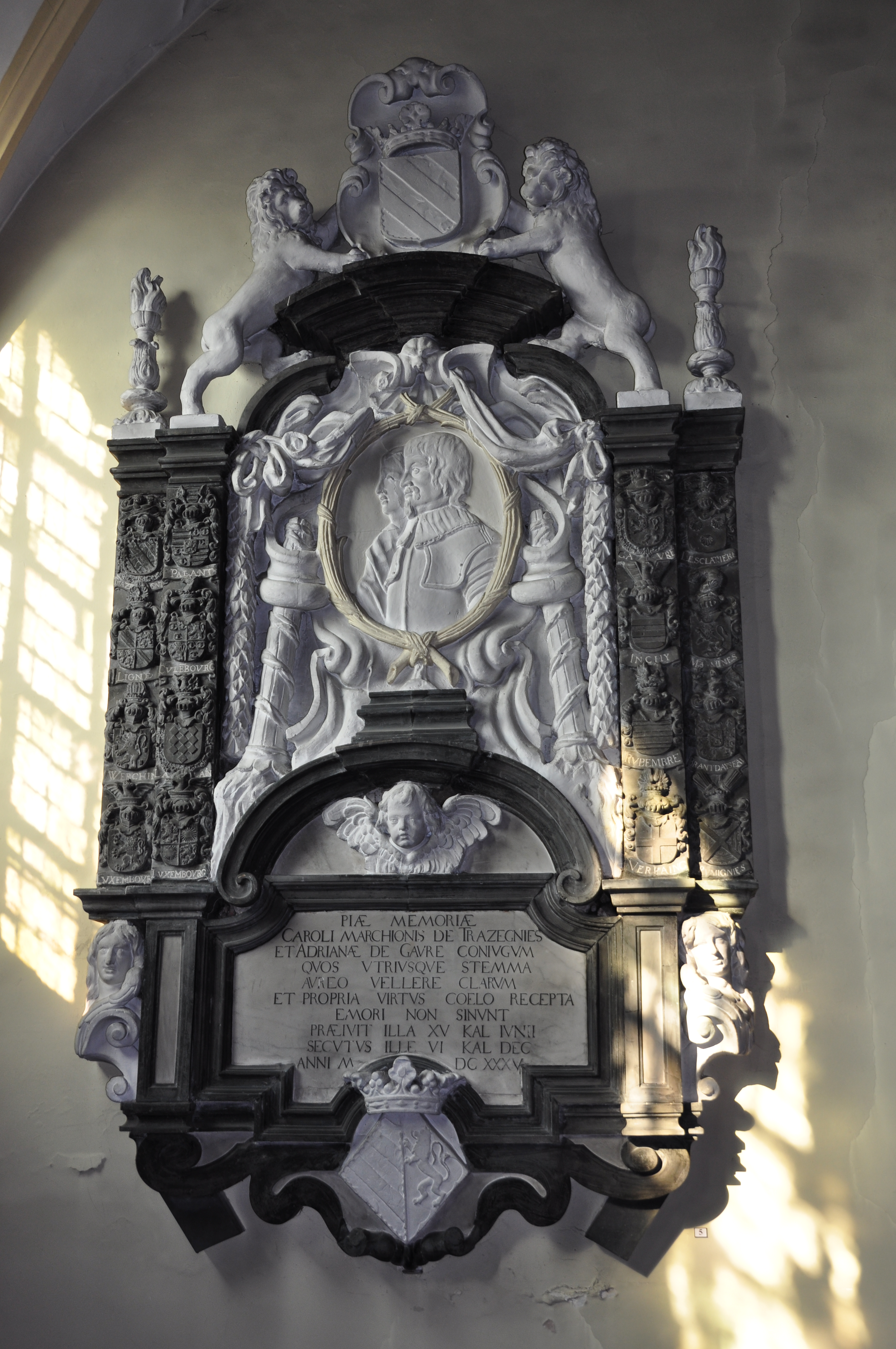
Charles II, marquess of Trazegnies

The Marquess of Trazegnies d'Ittre (Markies van Trazegnies or marquis de Trazegnies) is a member of the Belgian nobility. The title has been held for centuries by the noble house of Trazegnies (Maison de Trazegnies). They hold private residence in the Castle of Corroy-le-Château. The house of Trazegnies is divided into two families: de Trazegnies and de Trazegnies d'Itrre.

== History ==
The first recorded lord of the house was Giles I of Trazegnies (1134–1161). The title of marquess was conferred by Holy Roman Empress and Archduchess of Austria, Maria Theresa, upon the descendants of Eugène Gillion, Marquess de Trazegnies, who became Marquess of Ittre after his marriage to Marie Victoire de Rifflart, daughter of Leopold de Rifflart. Their son, Gilles Charles, was the second Marquess of Trazegnies d'Ittre. He married Amélie Constance of Nassau-Corroy. His descendants still live in Belgium, and belong to one of the oldest noble houses of Belgium.

== Today ==
Olivier de Trazegnies d'Ittre, the current Marquess, still lives in the Castle of Corroy-le-Château.
