= Charles Kayser =

Charles Kayser may refer to:

- Charles Edmond Kayser (1882–1965), French visual artist, teacher, and curator
- Charles Willy Kayser (1881–1942), German film actor
