= List of protected heritage sites in Nassogne =

This table shows an overview of the protected heritage sites in the Walloon town Nassogne. This list is part of Belgium's national heritage.

Object	Year/architect	Town/section	Address	Coordinates	Number^{?}	Image
The Romanesque choir of the Church of Saint Monon in Nassogne and the site formed by the church, the cemetery and around the old town wall ^{(nl)} ^{(fr)}		Nassogne		50.128529°N 5.341185°E	83040-CLT-0001-01 Info	De Romaanse koor van de kerk Saint Monon in Nassogne en de site gevormd door de kerk, de begraafplaats eromheen en de oude ringmuur More images
The church of Saint Monon and the wall of the church to the surrounding old cemetery in Nassogne ^{(nl)} ^{(fr)}		Nassogne		50.128380°N 5.340900°E	83040-CLT-0002-01 Info	De kerk van Saint Monon en de wand van de om de kerk heen liggende oude begraafplaats in Nassogne More images
The dolmen s in the territory of the district Forrières ^{(nl)} ^{(fr)}		Nassogne	Forrières	50.130446°N 5.267106°E	83040-CLT-0003-01 Info	
Castle Grune ^{(nl)} ^{(fr)}		Nassogne	Grune	50.156385°N 5.384095°E	83040-CLT-0004-01 Info	
The building on the Rue de Masbourg 2, Lesterny ^{(nl)} ^{(fr)}		Nassogne	rue de Masbourg 2, Lesterny	50.112821°N 5.281961°E	83040-CLT-0005-01 Info	Het gebouw aan de Rue de Masbourg 2, Lesterny

== See also ==
- List of protected heritage sites in Luxembourg (Belgium)
