= Théophile Godfraind =

Belgian physiologist and pharmacologist (1931–2026)

- Born: 18 February 1931; Bande, Belgium
- Died: 1 September 2026 (aged 95); Brussels, Belgium
- Education: Catholic University of Louvain
- Occupations: Physiologist; Pharmacologist

Théophile Godfraind (18 February 1931 – 1 September 2026) was a Belgian physiologist and pharmacologist.

He was a longtime professor of these specialities at UCLouvain. In 1991, he became a member of the Academia Europaea.

Godfraind died in Brussels on 1 September 2026, at the age of 95.
