= Almodóvar del Campo =

- Municipality
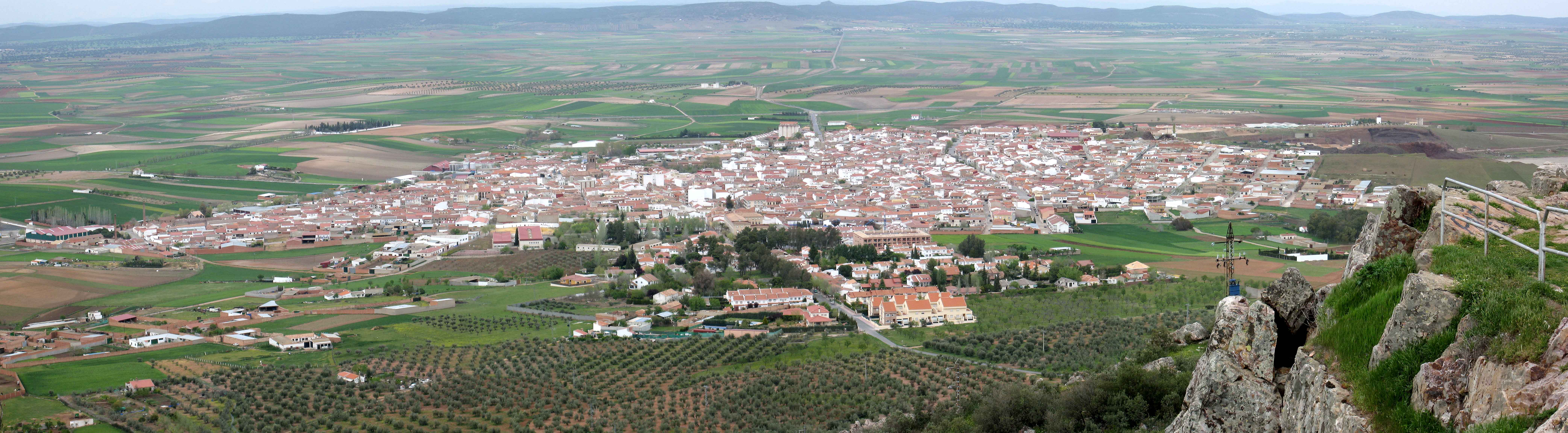

- Coat of arms
- Interactive map of Almodóvar del Campo
- Location within Castilla-La Mancha Location within Spain
- Coordinates: 38°43′7″N 4°10′0″W
- Country: Spain
- Autonomous community: Castilla–La Mancha
- Province: Ciudad Real

Area
  - Total: 1,208.25 km^{2} (466.51 sq mi)
- Elevation: 669 m (2,195 ft)

Population (2025-01-01)
  - Total: 5,637
  - Density: 4.665/km^{2} (12.08/sq mi)
- Demonyms: Almodovareño, almodoveño
- Time zone: UTC+1 (CET)
  - Summer (DST): UTC+2 (CEST)

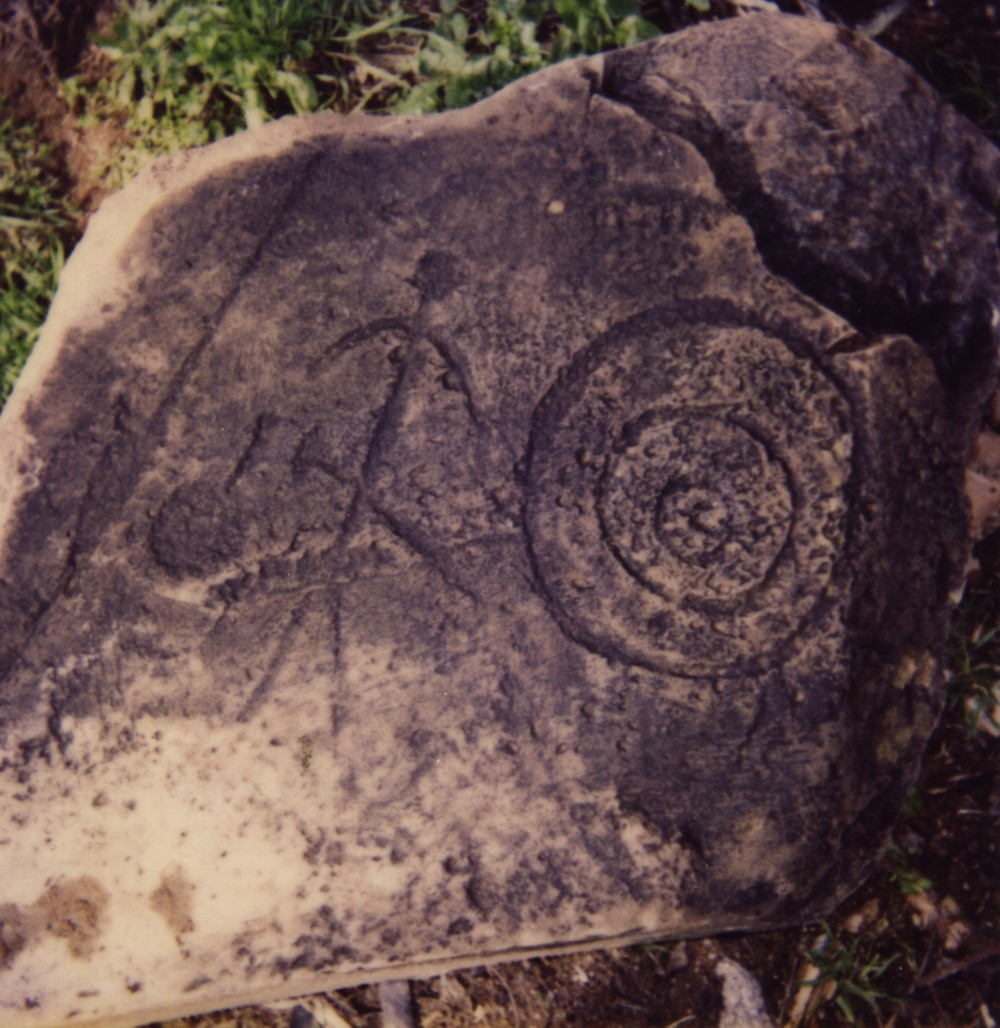
Palaeolithic rock art in Almodóvar del Campo

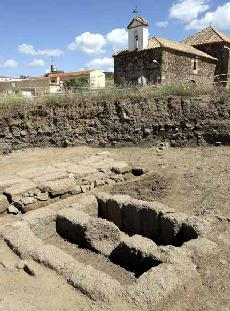
"Sisaso" was a Roman city inside what is now the municipality of Almodóvar del Campo.

Almodóvar del Campo is a municipality of Spain, located in the province of Ciudad Real, autonomous community of Castilla–La Mancha. As of 1 January 2020, it had a population of 5,983.

== Geography ==
The town of Almodóvar del Campo is located on the northern side of the Sierra de Alcudia, at about 669 metres above mean sea level.

Featuring a total area of 1.208,25 km^{2}, Almodóvar del Campo is the largest municipality in the region and the fifth largest municipality in Spain. In addition to the main settlement of Almodóvar, the municipality includes ten pedanías: La Bienvenida, Retamar, Fontanosas, La Viñuela, San Benito, Navacerrada, Tirteafuera, Minas del Horcajo, Valdeazogues, and Veredas.

== History ==
The former settlement of Sisapo has been identified as the La Bienvenida archaeological site, which is located near the hamlet of the same name. The foundation mark has been pushed back to the late-8th to early-7th centuries BC. There is doubt on whether Sisapo was an Oretani city, although Plinius presented it as a Turduli city. Sisapo thrived during the Roman era on the basis of the exploitation of cinnabar, a mercury ore. The mines decreased in activity by the late-2nd to early-3rd centuries AD.

The etymological origin of Almodóvar is the Arabic al-mudawwar, meaning 'the round (one)'. In the mid-12th century, the forces of Munio Alfonso handed a blow to the Saracen forces of Texufin in the plains of Almodóvar.

Part of the Order of Calatrava's dominion in the Meseta Sur, the Campo de Calatrava, Almódovar became the headquarters of one of the order's largest encomiendas, and its economy thrived throughout the late middle ages thanks to the pastures. Almodóvar celebrated two fairs (created towards 1260), which eventually became a weekly open market from 1376 onward. Over the late middle ages, Almodóvar had minorities of judeoconversos, mudéjares and foreigners (Genoese, Portuguese, Flemish and French). Created towards 1456, in the context of the Calatravan interests to guarantee safety from banditry in the area as well as to curb the influence of the Hermandad de Ciudad Real, the so-called Santa Hermandad Vieja de Almodóvar del Campo came to exert judicial and policial powers in the area for centuries.

An Inquisition court began operating in Almodóvar in 1486.

On the eve of the 1855 desamortización, the municipality of Almodóvar had 78,892.55 hectares of publicly-owned monte. All of them were privatized between 1896 and 1897.

The mining of Almodóvar's oil shale resources fostered the 20th-century industrial development of neighbouring Puertollano.

Notable people from Almodóvar del Campo include Mercédès Legrand.
