= Mercédès Legrand =

Spanish-born Belgian painter, poet (1893–1945)

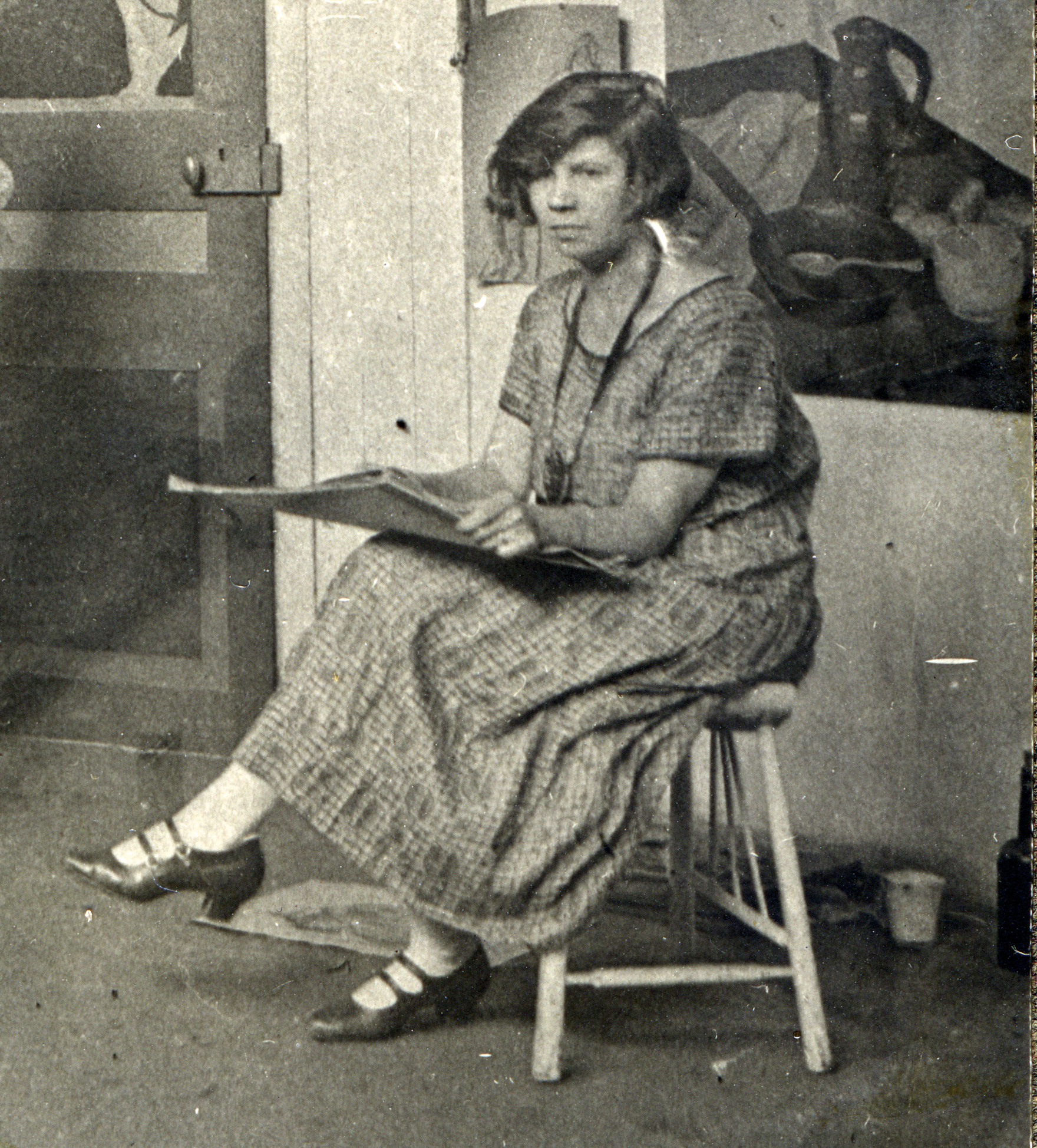
- Mercédès Legrand, circa 1920
- Born: 14 July 1893; Almodóvar del Campo, Castilla–La Mancha, Spain
- Died: 17 July 1945 (aged 52); Avignon, France
- Other names: Mercedes Legrand
- Education: Royal Academy of Fine Arts, Brussels
- Occupations: Visual artist, illustrator, poet
- Known for: Painter, enameller, sculptor, potter
- Spouse(s): Roger van Gindertael (m. 1921–?), Charles Edmond Kayser (m. c.1928–1946; her death)
- Children: 3

Mercédès Legrand (1893–1945) was a Spanish-born Belgian visual artist, illustrator, and poet. She was known for her work as a painter, enameller, and potter. She is also known as Mercedes Legrand.

== Early life and education ==
Mercédès Legrand was born on 14 July 1893, Almodóvar del Campo, Castilla–La Mancha, Spain to Belgian parents. The first ten years of her childhood were spent in Spain, before she moved abroad to Brussels, Belgium, England and Germany for schooling.

She attended the Royal Academy of Fine Arts, Brussels, from 1916 to 1919.

In 1921, she married a classmate Roger Van Gindertael, who was an art critic and painter, they settled in Paris in the 1920s. Together they had a child, Jean-Michel (born 1924) in Brussels.

== Career ==
In September 1920, Legrand completed a World War I memorial in Nassogne, Belgium, commissioned by the municipality, and is depicting a civilian confronted with the remains of a soldier.

Legrand, Van Gindertael, and Michel de Goeye co-created Hélianthe, an avant-garde arts review magazine. In Paris, she exhibited regularly artists such as Jean Pougny, Emmanuel Mané-Katz, Raoul Dufy, Edouard Vuillard, Georges Rouault, Othon Friesz, and André Lhote.

In 1928 (or in 1937, depending on the source), she married Jewish artist Charles Edmond Kayser. In 1941, the family moved to Limoges, where her husband was working. During this period she started working in enamels, which were to become an important part of her work. They moved to Avignon in the 1940s, where she died in 1945 from the inhalation of nitric acid while enameling.

== Legacy ==
Her archives are held at the Bibliothèque Kandinsky. Her work can be found in museum collections, including at the La Piscine Museum, and Beaux–Arts Mons.

In 2020, a posthumous retrospective exhibition of Legrand's artwork, Mercédès Legrand (1893–1945): à fleur de toile: exposition, was shown at the Musée du Mont-de-Piété de Bergues in Bergues, France, and at Famenne & Art Museum (FAM) in Marche-en-Famenne, Belgium.

== Publications ==
- Legrand, Mercédès (1925). Horcajo. Roger Van Gindertael (engravings). Brussels: Editions de la Vache Rose.
- Legrand, Mercédès (1928). Géographies: Poèmes. Valery Larbaud (prologue). Maestricht: A.A.M. Stols.
- d' Ors, Eugenio (1930). Jardin des Plantes (in French). Jean Cassou (translator), Francis de Miomandre (translator), Mercédès Legrand (translator) (3 ed.). Paris: Éditions J.O. Fourcade.
