= Saint Monon =

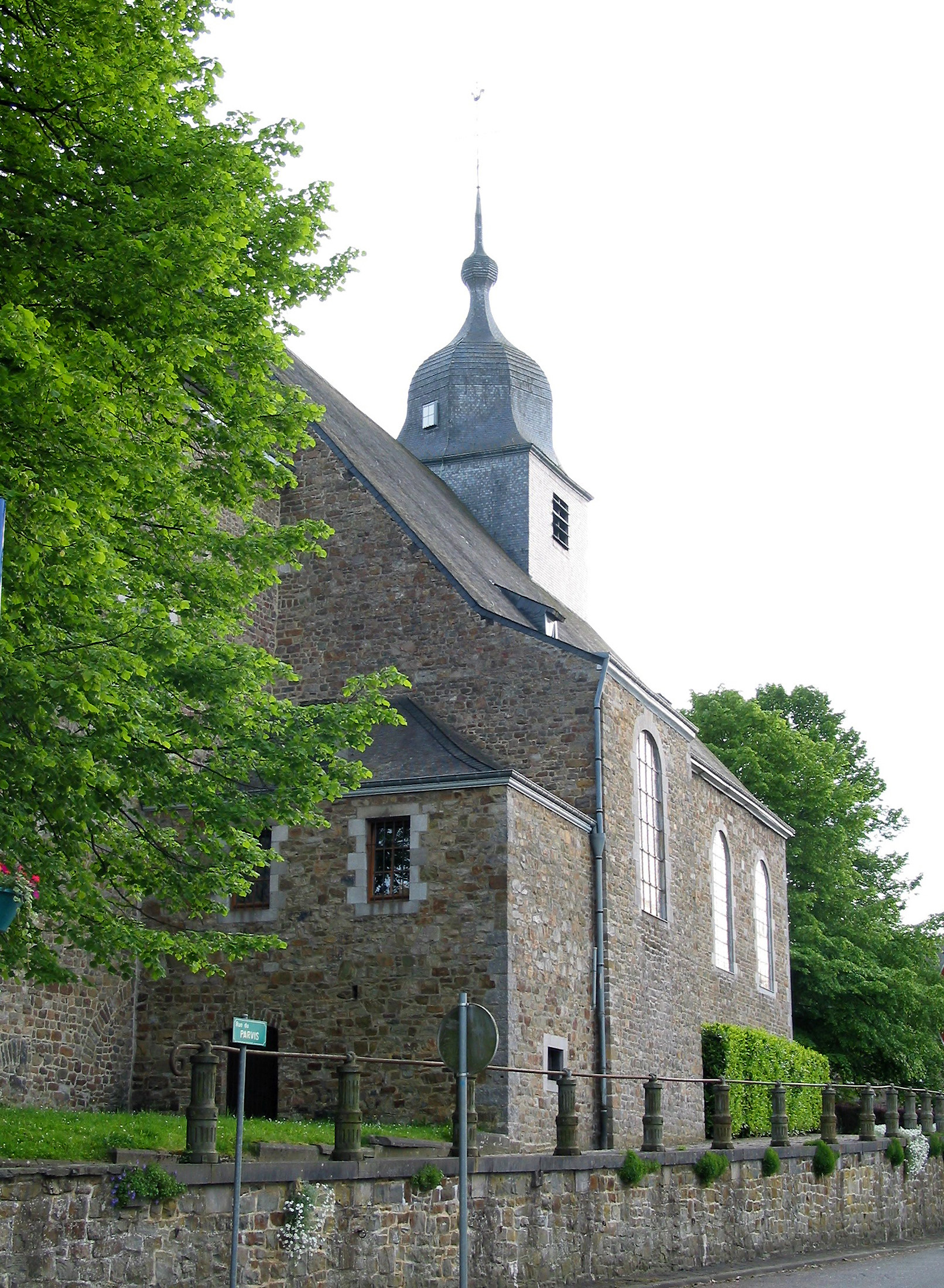
- Nassogne (Belgium), the church of Saint Monon (XVII/XVIII centuries)
- Born: Scotland
- Died: c. 645; Nassogne, Belgium
- Canonized: Pre-congregation
- Feast: 18 October
- Attributes: Standing with a cow
- Patronage: Livestock

Saint Monon (or Mono, Muno, Monone; died c. 645) was a Scottish hermit and martyr. His feast day is 18 October.

== Life and legacy ==
Saint Monon was born in Scotland and moved to the Ardennes, where he lived as a hermit. He was murdered around 645 AD in Nassogne in what is now Belgium. His body, which had been beheaded, was placed in an oratory. Pilgrims began to visit his shrine, and it was said that many miracles occurred. He is honoured in the Ardennes as a protector of livestock, and is traditionally shown standing with a cow. Pilgrims to his shrine used to rub grass or leaves on the reliquary of Saint Monon, then give it to their cattle to protect them from epidemics. They would also hang a flower or a bouquet in their stable.

The Chapelle Saint-Monon in Hubermont, La Roche-en-Ardenne, is a small schist building built around 1658, renovated in 1817 and restored in 1982. A neogothic church built in 1850 in Jévigné, Lierneux, is dedicated to the saint, and has a polychrome wood statue of him. His name is given to a local beer brewed in the village of Ambly, Nassogne, named Saint-Monon.

== Monks of Ramsgate account ==
The monks of St Augustine's Abbey, Ramsgate wrote in their Book of Saints (1921),

Monon (St.) M. (Oct. 18)
(Date uncertain.) A Scottish Saint who crossed over to the Continent and lived as a hermit in the Forest of the Ardennes, where he was done to death by men of evil life. He is famous for miracles.

== Butler's account ==
The hagiographer Alban Butler (1710–1773) wrote in his Lives of the Fathers, Martyrs, and Other Principal Saints under October 18,

St. Monon, M. He left Scotland, his native country, and retired into the forest of Ardennes, where he led a holy life in the seventh century. He was massacred in his cell by robbers, and was buried in the village of Nassaw, which at present belongs to the abbey of St. Hubert. His tomb was rendered famous by miracles. There was a church dedicated under his invocation near the city of St. Andrew’s in Scotland, called to this day Monon’s Kirk. See Molanus, addit. ad Usuard, and King, in Calend.

== Sources ==
- Butler, Alban (1799), The Lives of the Primitive Fathers, Martyrs, and Other Principal Saints: Compiled from Original Monuments and Other Authentic Records, vol. 10, Edinburgh: J. Moir This article incorporates text from this source, which is in the public domain.
- Chapelle Saint-Monon (in French), Maison du Tourisme Coeur de l’Ardenne
- Local beer on a legendary background, Brasserie Saint-Monon
- "October 18", Orthodox England, St John's Orthodox Church, Colchester
- Saint-Monon, Open Churches Foundation
- St. Augustine's Abbey, Ramsgate (1921), The Book of saints : a dictionary of servants of God canonized by the Catholic Church, London: A. & C. Black, ltd. This article incorporates text from this source, which is in the public domain.
