= Charles Edmond Kayser =

French painter (1882–1965)

- Born: 24 April 1882; Paris, France
- Died: 9 June 1965 (aged 83); Paris, France
- Other names: Edmond Charles Kayser, Edmond Kayser
- Occupations: Painter, watercolorist, printmaker, teacher, curator, arts administrator
- Employer(s): École nationale supérieure des arts décoratifs, Musée national Adrien-Dubouché
- Spouse: Mercédès Legrand (m. c. 1928–1945; her death)
- Children: 2

Charles Edmond Kayser (1882 – 1965) was a French visual artist, teacher, arts administrator, and curator. His work was known for themes of urban landscapes, seascapes, and landscapes. Kayser taught at Académie Scandinave in Paris for many years. He was also known as Edmond Charles Kayser, and Edmond Kayser.

== Biography ==
Charles Edmond Kayser was born on 24 April 1882, in Paris. Kayser was Jewish. He was mainly self-taught, but also studied under Eugène Carrière. In either 1928 or 1937, he married Spanish-born Belgium painter Mercédès Legrand.

In 1938, he was appointed director of the École nationale supérieure des arts décoratifs. From 1938 to 1941, Kayser served as the curator of the Musée national Adrien-Dubouché in Limoges, a role from which he was dismissed from because of antisemitism. The family moved to Avignon in the 1940s, where his wife died in 1945 from the inhalation of nitric acid while enameling.

He was a figurative painter, however he also took Paul Cézanne's constructional approach to the work. Kayser taught at Académie Scandinave in Paris. He regularly exhibited his art at the Société des Artistes Indépendants.

He died on 9 June 1965, in Paris. The Société des Artistes Indépendants organized a posthumous exhibition in 1979 of Kayser's work. His artwork can be found in museum collections, including the Fine Arts Museums of San Francisco; the Baltimore Museum of Art; and Musée du Mont-de-Piété in Bergues.
