= Nassogne =

Municipality in Wallonia, Belgium

- Municipality
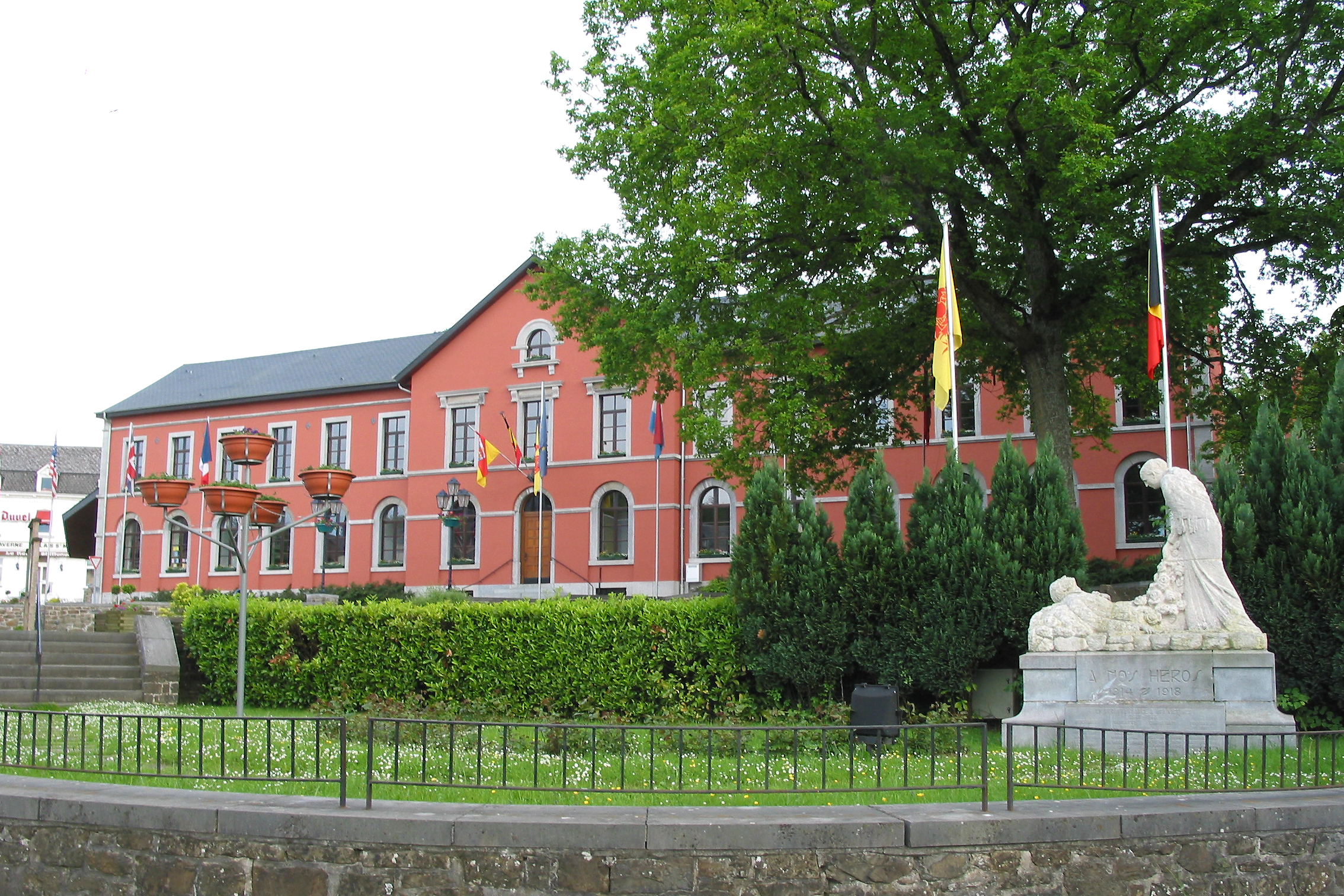

- Flag Coat of arms

- Location of Nassogne in Luxembourg province
- Interactive map of Nassogne
- Location in Belgium
- Coordinates: 50°08′N 05°21′E
- Country: Belgium
- Community: French Community
- Region: Wallonia
- Province: Luxembourg
- Arrondissement: Marche-en-Famenne

Government
  - Mayor: Marc Quirynen
  - Governing party: Intérêts Communaux Nassogne (ICN)

Area
  - Total: 113.11 km^{2} (43.67 sq mi)

Population (2018-01-01)
  - Total: 5,474
  - Density: 48.40/km^{2} (125.3/sq mi)
- Postal codes: 6950-6953
- NIS code: 83040
- Area codes: 084
- Website: nassogne.be

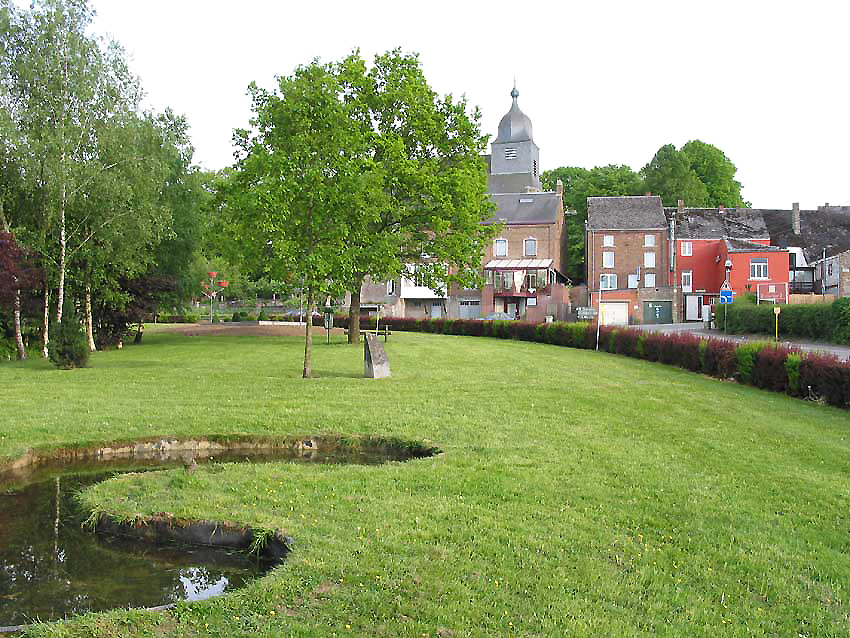
Nassogne: near St Monon's church

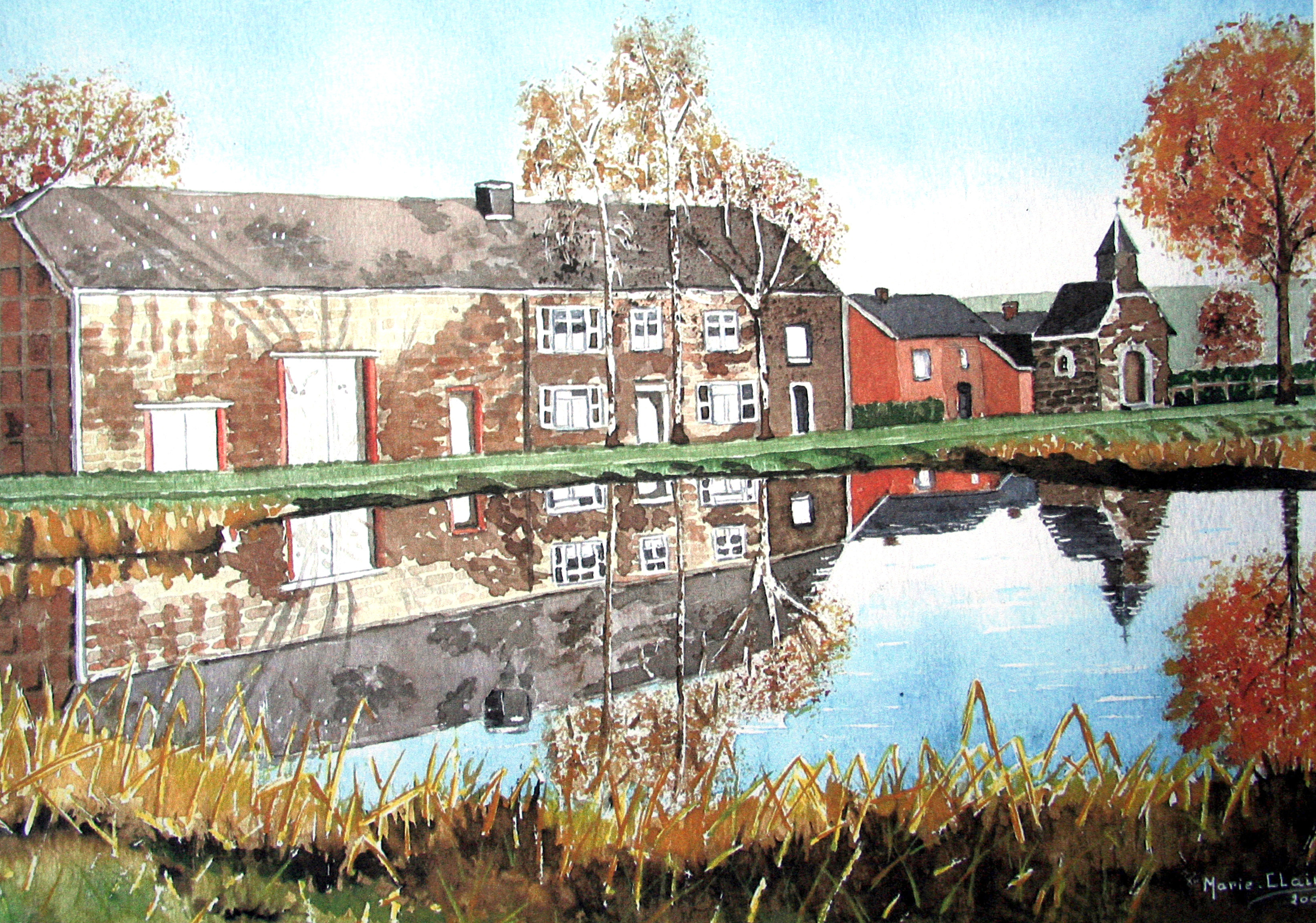
Pond of "Les Goffes".

Nassogne (French pronunciation: [nasɔɲ]) is a municipality of Wallonia located in the province of Luxembourg, Belgium.

On 1 January 2007 the municipality, which covers 111.96 km^{2}, had 5,045 inhabitants, giving a population density of 45.1 inhabitants per km^{2}.

The municipality consists of the following districts: Ambly, Bande, Forrières, Grune, Harsin, Lesterny, Masbourg (including Mormont), and Nassogne.

The "monument aux morts de Nassogne" is a World War I memorial sculpture in Nassogne, made by artist Mercédès Legrand.

== See also ==
- List of protected heritage sites in Nassogne
