= Musée national Adrien-Dubouché =

French national museum

Coordinates: 45.832°N 1.252°E

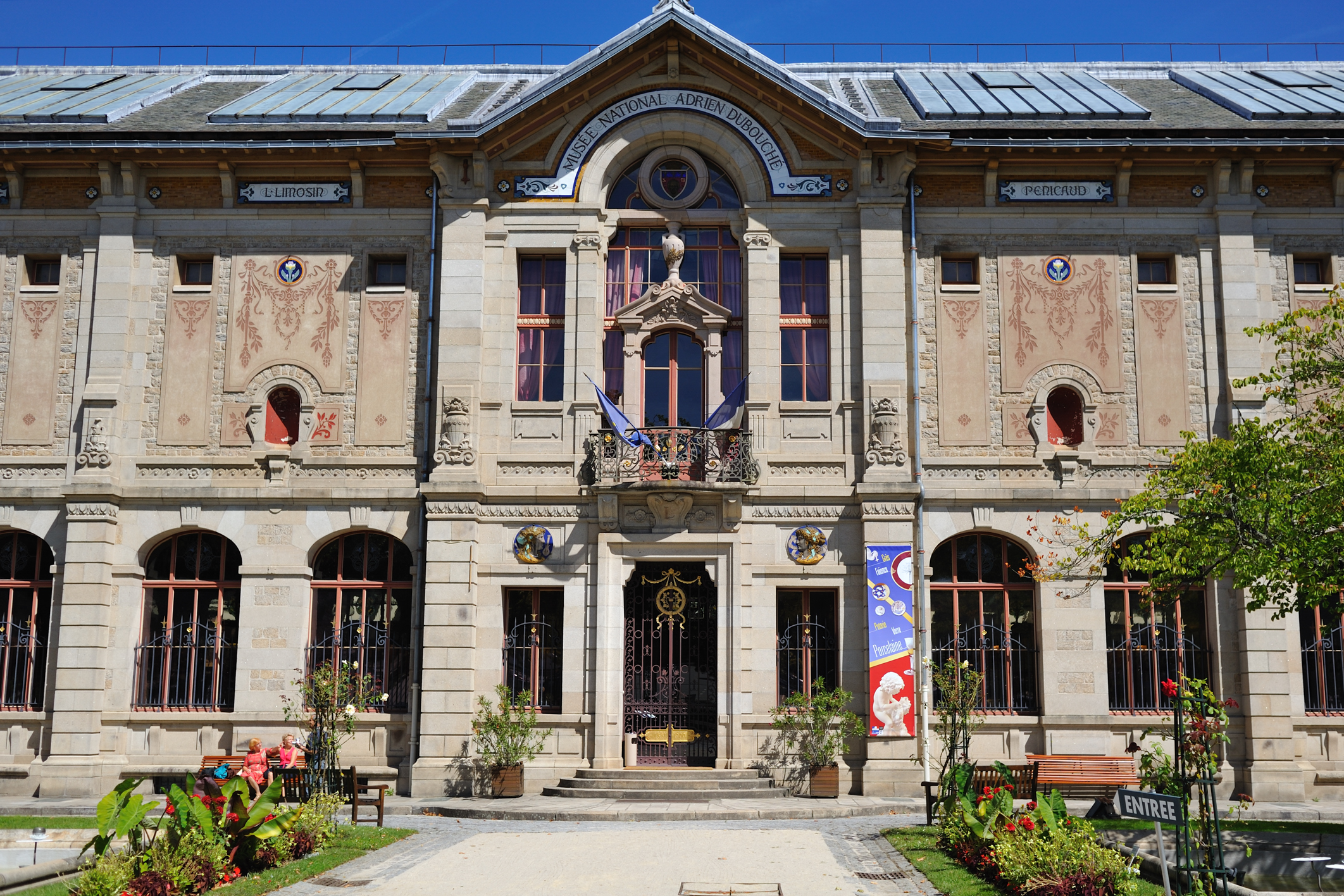
- Established: 1845
- Location: Limoges, Nouvelle-Aquitaine, France
- Type: National museum
- Collections: Ceramics (porcelain, stoneware, earthenware and pottery)
- Collection size: 18,000
- Website: Official website

The Musée national Adrien-Dubouché is a French national museum dedicated to Limoges porcelain and the history of ceramics. Founded in 1845 and located in Limoges (Haute-Vienne), it is part of the Sèvres – Cité de la céramique public establishment.

== History ==
Founded in 1845 by Tiburce Morisot, prefect of the Haute-Vienne and father of the painter Berthe Morisot, the first Limoges museum was initially housed in the prefecture's premises on Place du Présidial, and its purpose was to build up a collection: paintings, sculptures and objets d'art were collected by members of the Société archéologique et historique du Limousin.

Adrien Dubouché, the son of a cloth merchant, took on the voluntary management of the institution in 1865 and began a series of donations to add to the collections; bequests were received from French and foreign ceramics manufacturers. The city of Limoges made available a disused hospice for the insane on the Place du Champ-de-Foire: the building was converted to display the collections and house the School of Decorative Arts, founded on the initiative of Adrien Dubouché.

In 1875, on the death of his friend Albert Jacquemart, author of the book Les Merveilles de la céramique, Adrien Dubouché acquired his ceramic collection, comprising 587 pieces, which he donated to the city of Limoges. In recognition of this gift, and even though Adrien Dubouché was still alive, the mayor of Limoges named the museum after him.

On the eve of Dubouché's death in 1881, the museum and school were nationalised. Since then, the museum has been known as the Musée National Adrien-Dubouché. The director of the Ecole Nationale Supérieure des Arts Décoratifs de Paris, Auguste Louvrier de Lajolais, was entrusted with the management of both establishments. Parisian architect Pierre-Henri Mayeux was commissioned to build the school and museum. He designed two adjoining buildings, which were inaugurated in 1900. Jewish artist Charles Edmond Kayser served as curator of the museum from 1938 to 1941, after which he was dismissed from his role due to antisemitism.

In the 1990s, the National School of Decorative Arts in Limoges moved to the university campus.

In 2003, the Ministry of Culture and Communication launched an international competition to renovate the museum, which was won by Viennese architect Boris Podrecca and museographer Zette Cazalas.

The museum was inaugurated on 28 June 2012.

On 4 September 2025, three Chinese porcelain works dating from the 14th to 18th centuries that were designated as national treasures and valued at €9.5 million were stolen following a heist at the museum.

== Collection ==
The Musée National Adrien Dubouché houses almost 18,000 works in ceramics (pottery, stoneware, earthenware and porcelain) and glass from various periods, from Antiquity to the present day, and from a wide range of civilisations: ceramics from Ancient Greece and Europe, Chinese porcelain, Islamic earthenware, stoneware pieces and European porcelain from the 17th century to the present day. The museum also has a glass collection. The glass-making centres of Venice, Nevers and Bohemia are all represented. The museum also houses a public collection of Limoges porcelain.

== Gallery ==
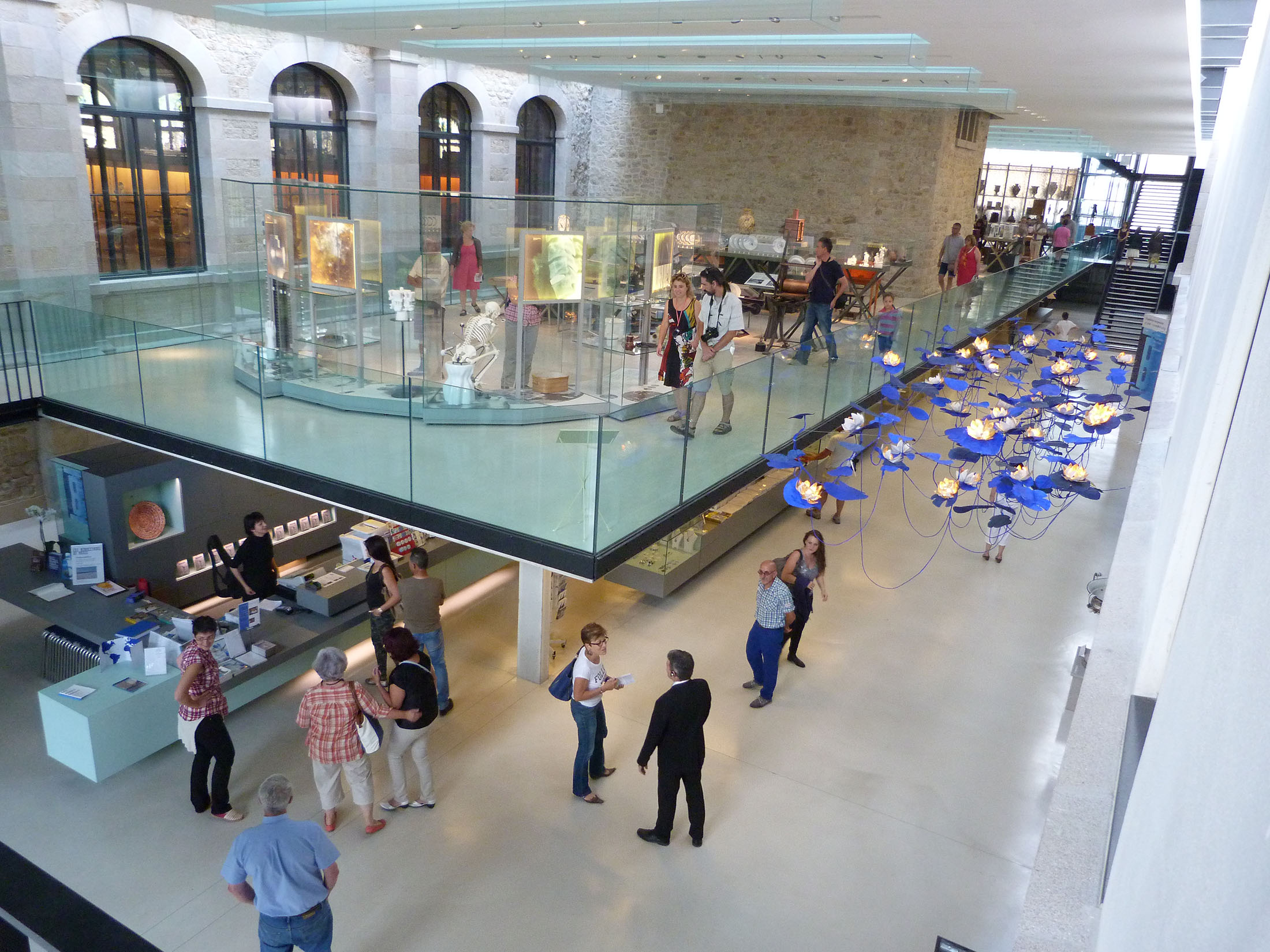
Reception hall

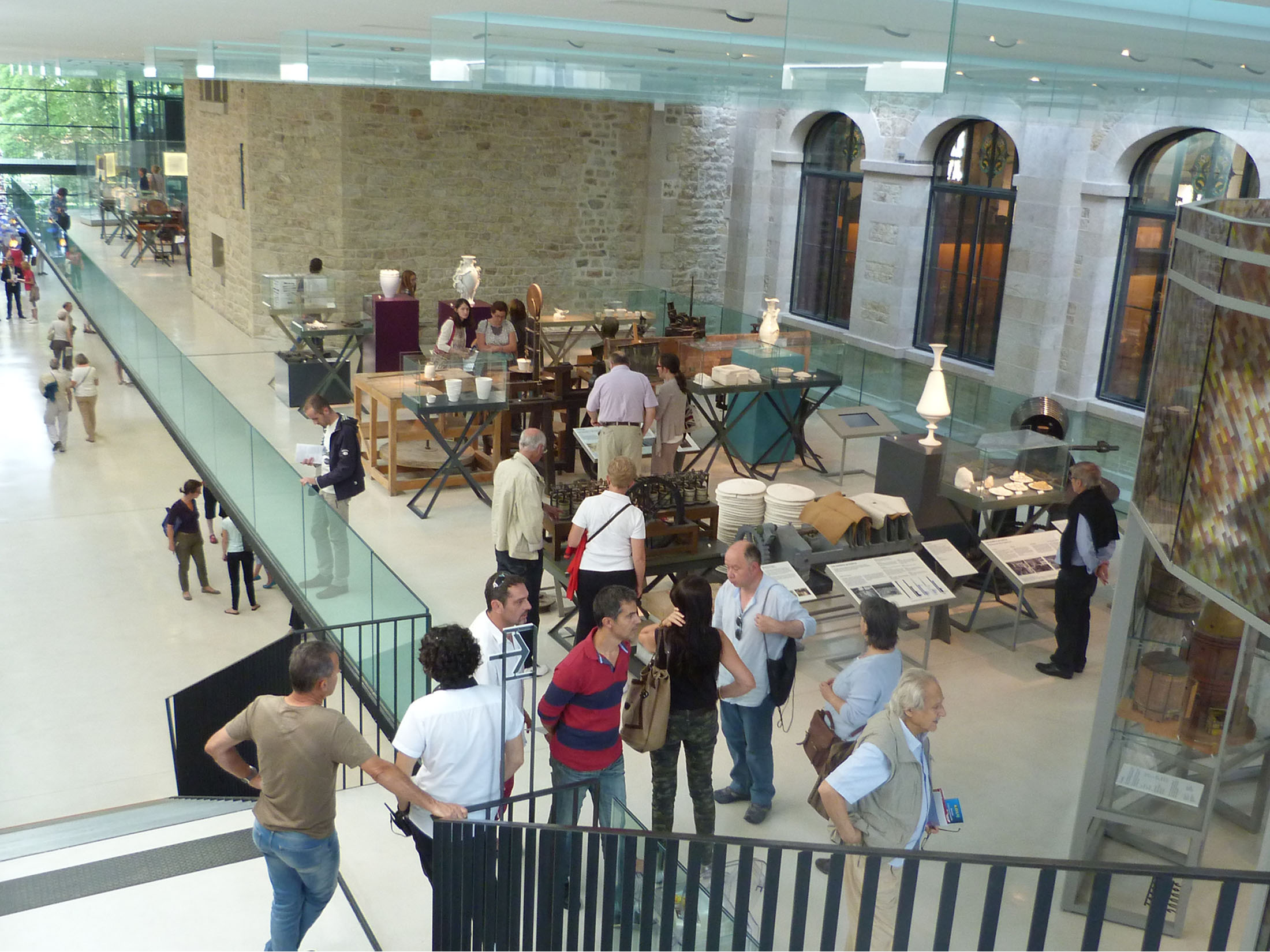
Technical mezzanine

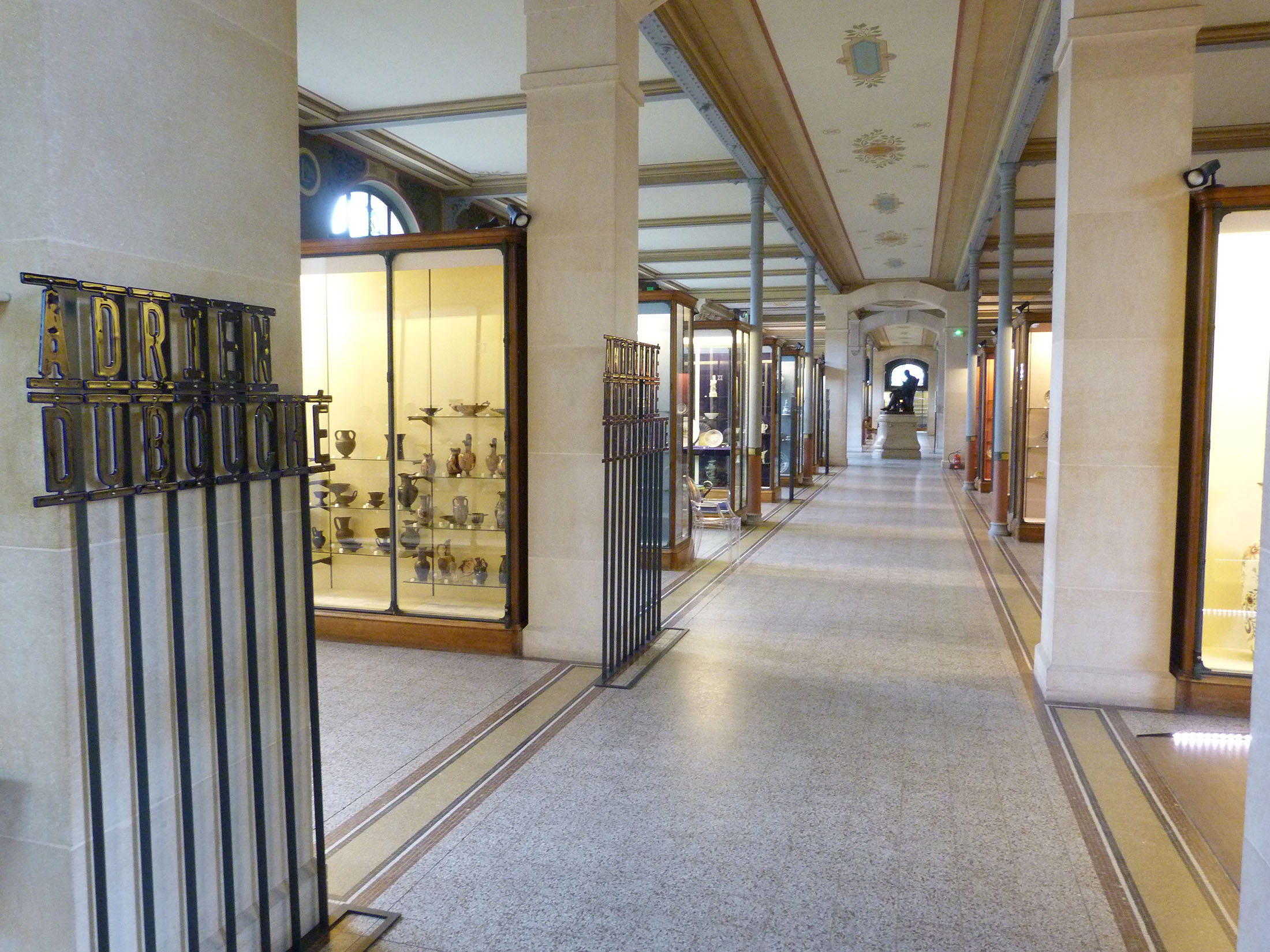
Ceramics from Antiquity to the 18th century.

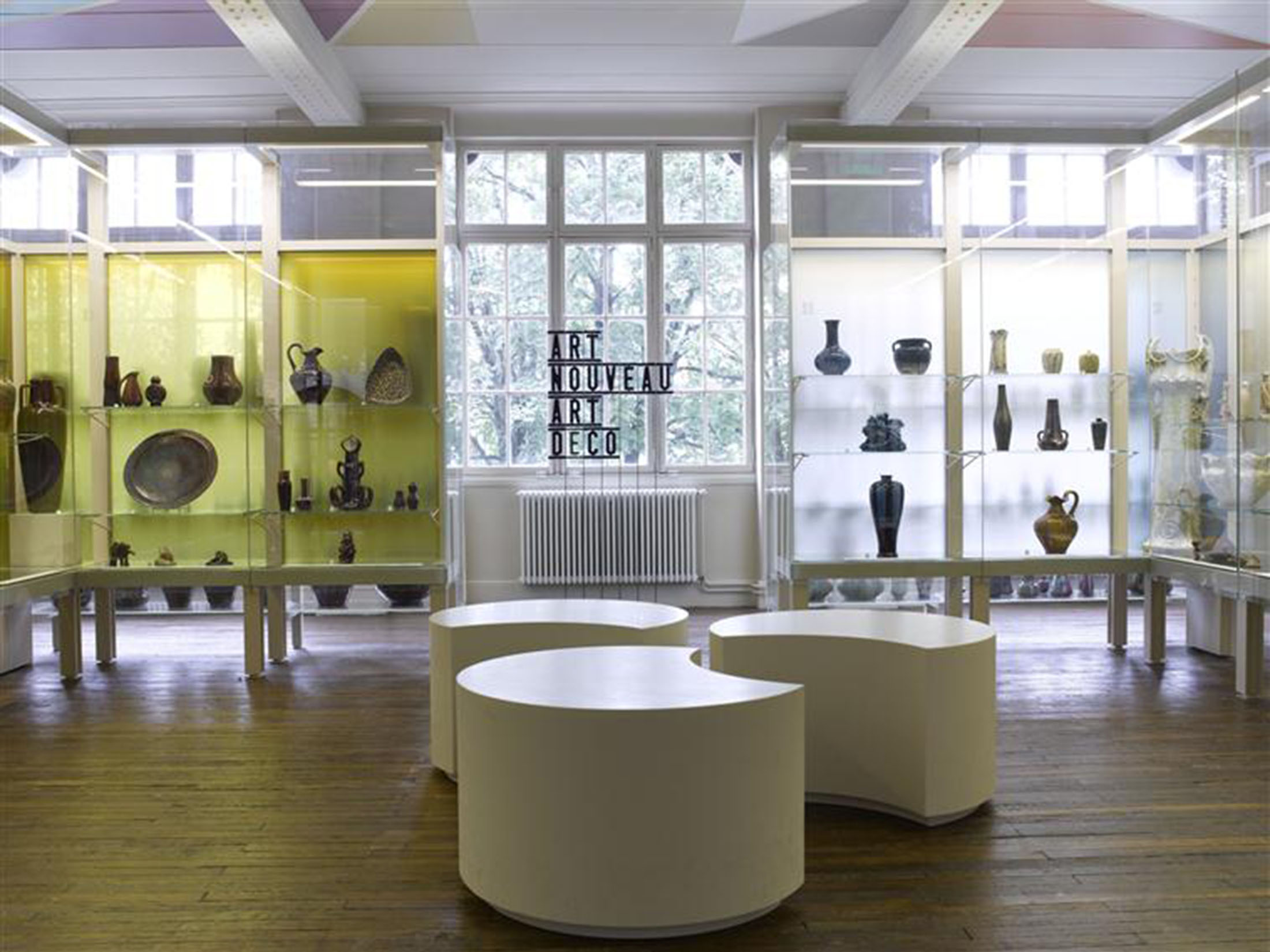
Ceramics from the 19th century to the present day.

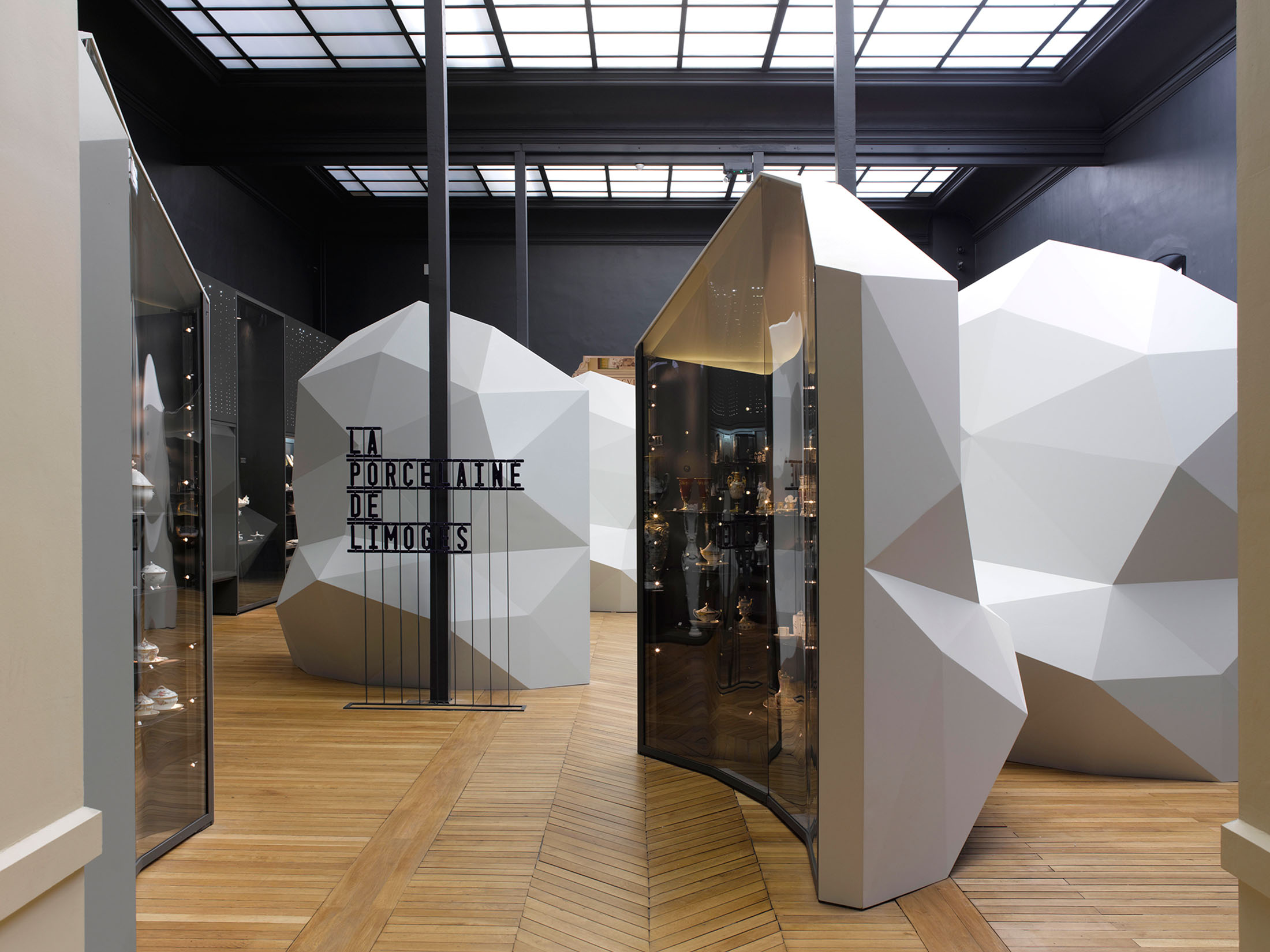
The rooms devoted to Limoges porcelain

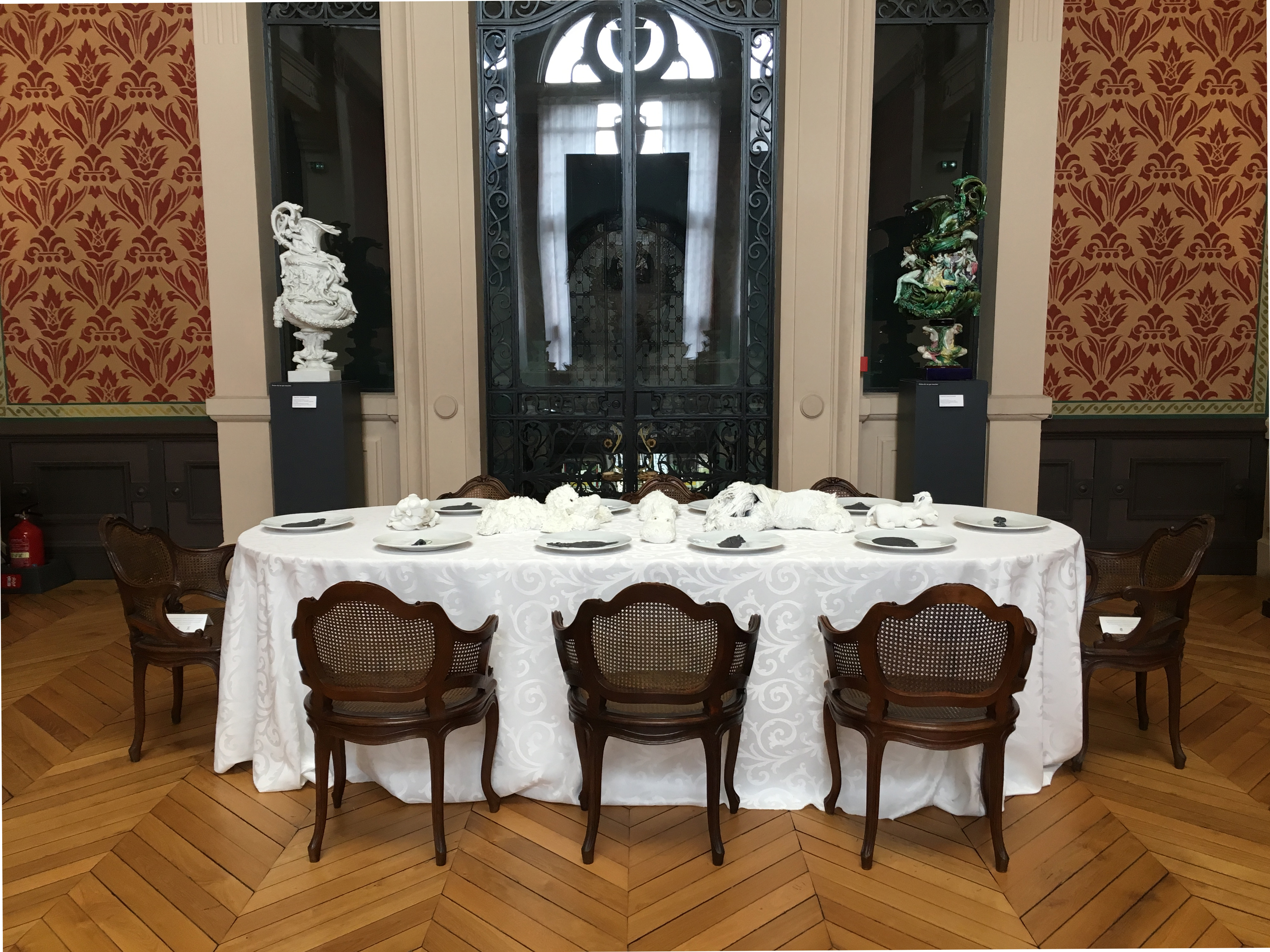
Installation by artist Zhuo Qi, 2016

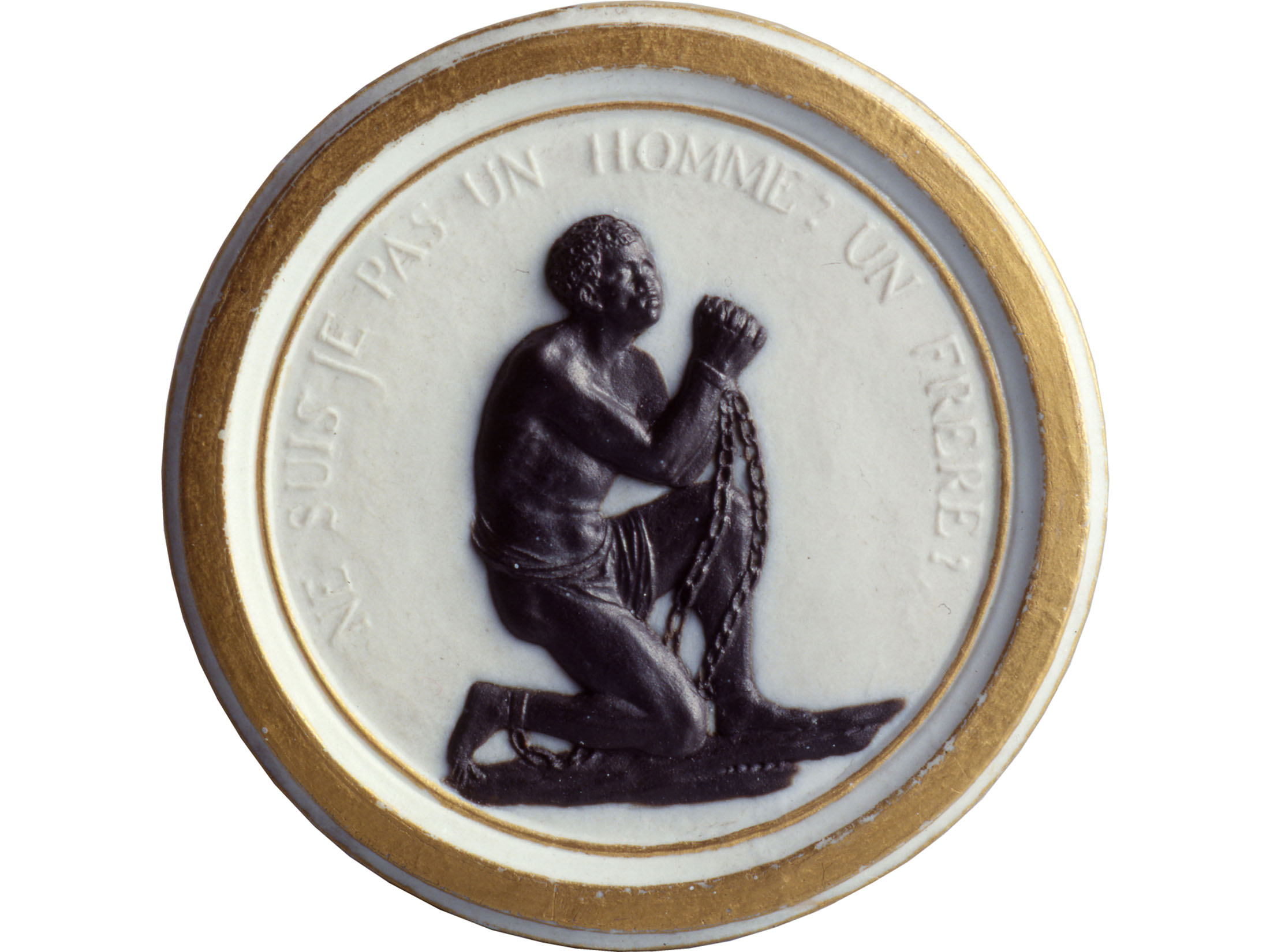
Médaillon "Ne suis-je pas un homme, un frère ?", porcelaine tendre, Manufacture royale de Sèvres, 1789.

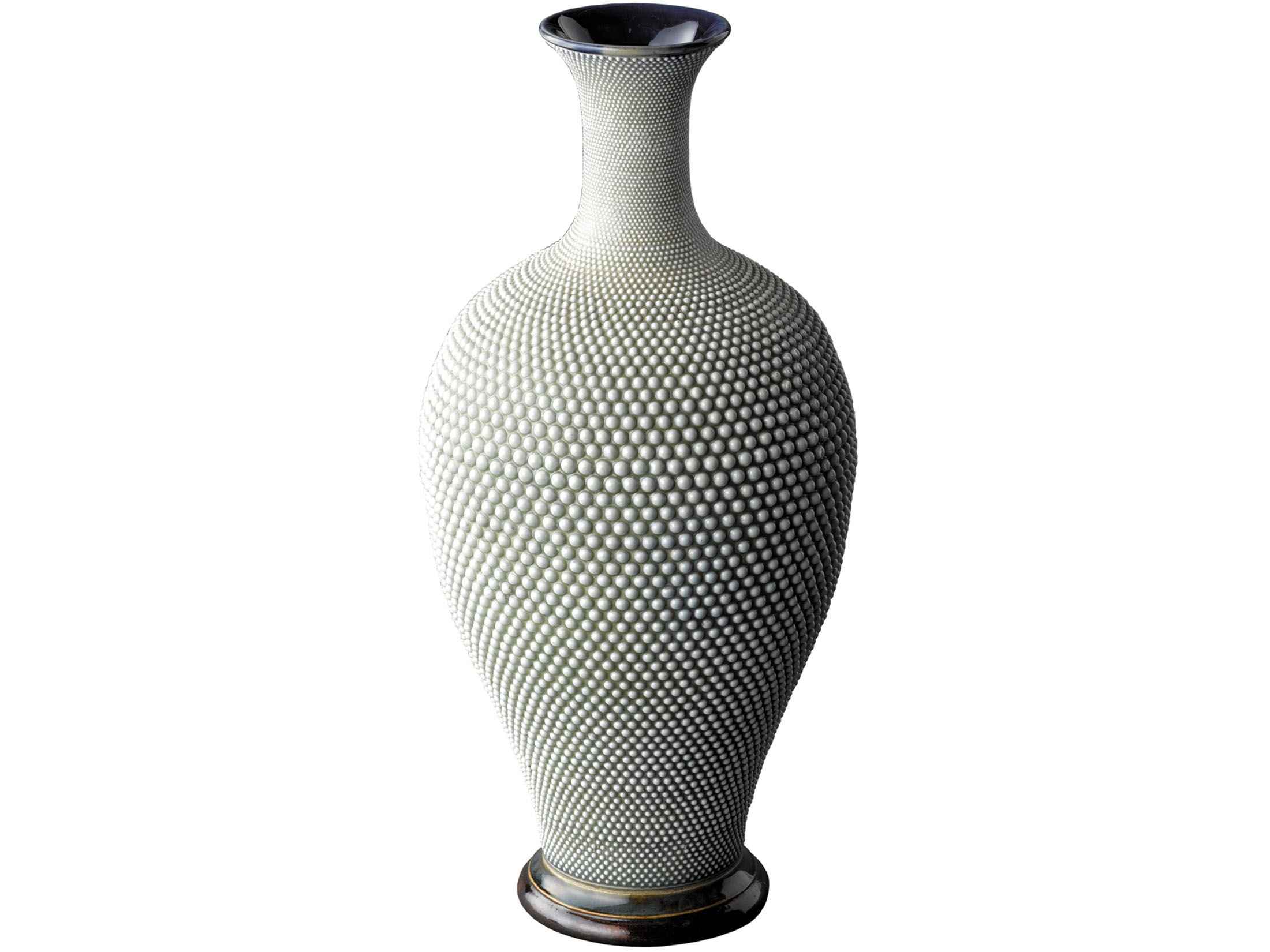
Vase, stoneware, Manufacture Doulton et compagnie, 1878

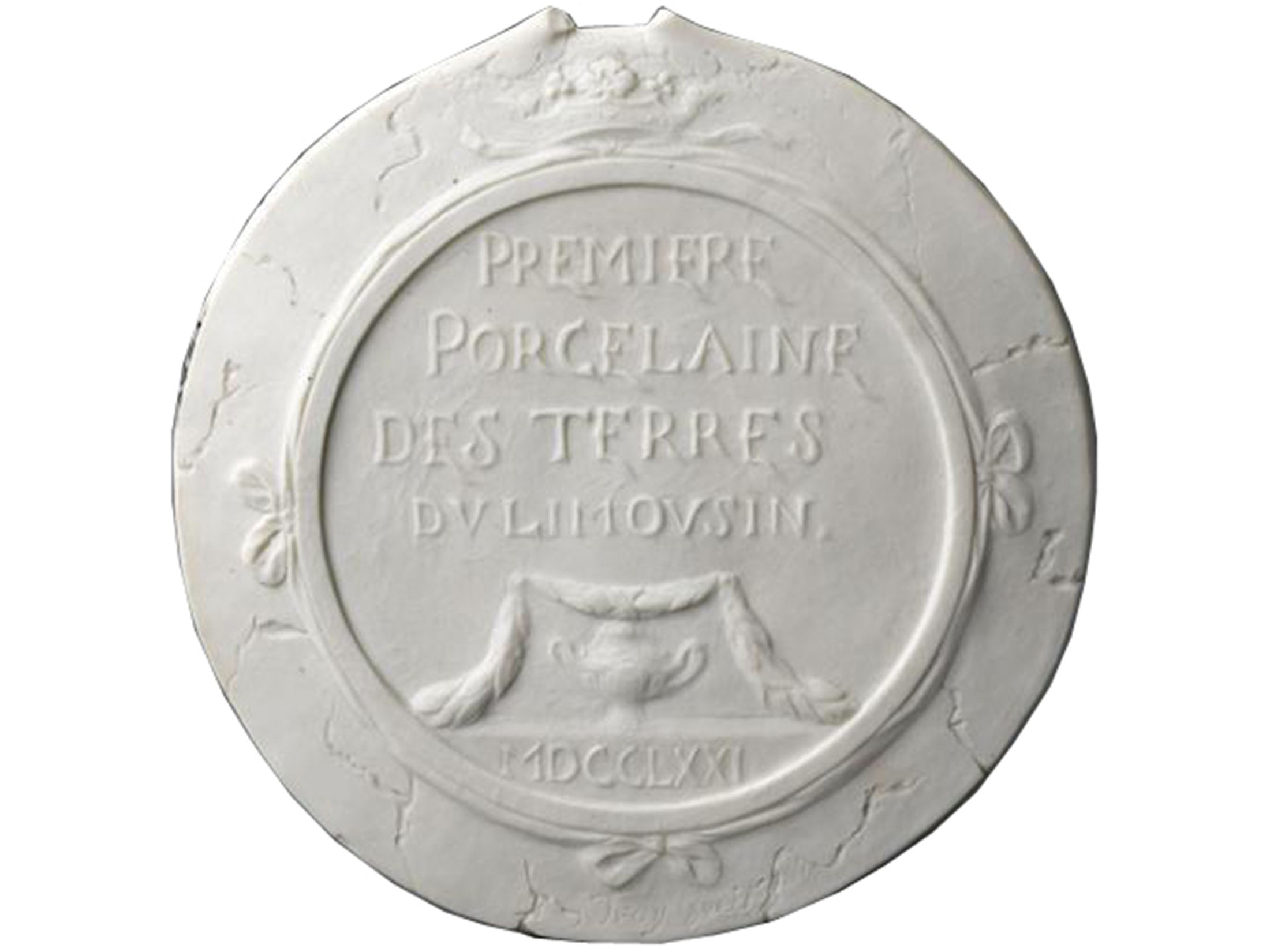
Medallion First Limousin earthenware, hard porcelain biscuit, Limoges, 1771.

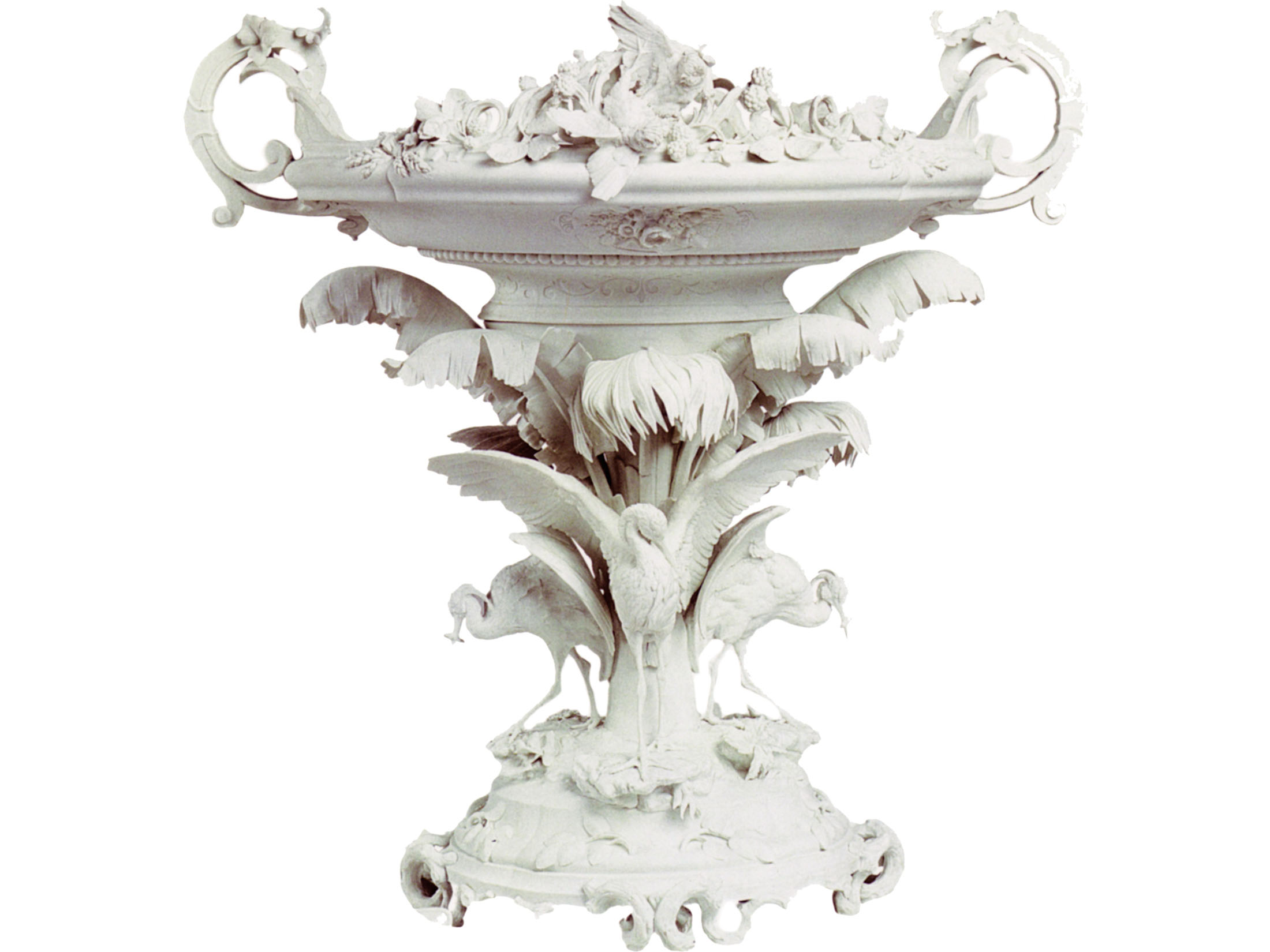
Especially the Cérès riche service, hard porcelain, Limoges, Pouyat factory, 1855.

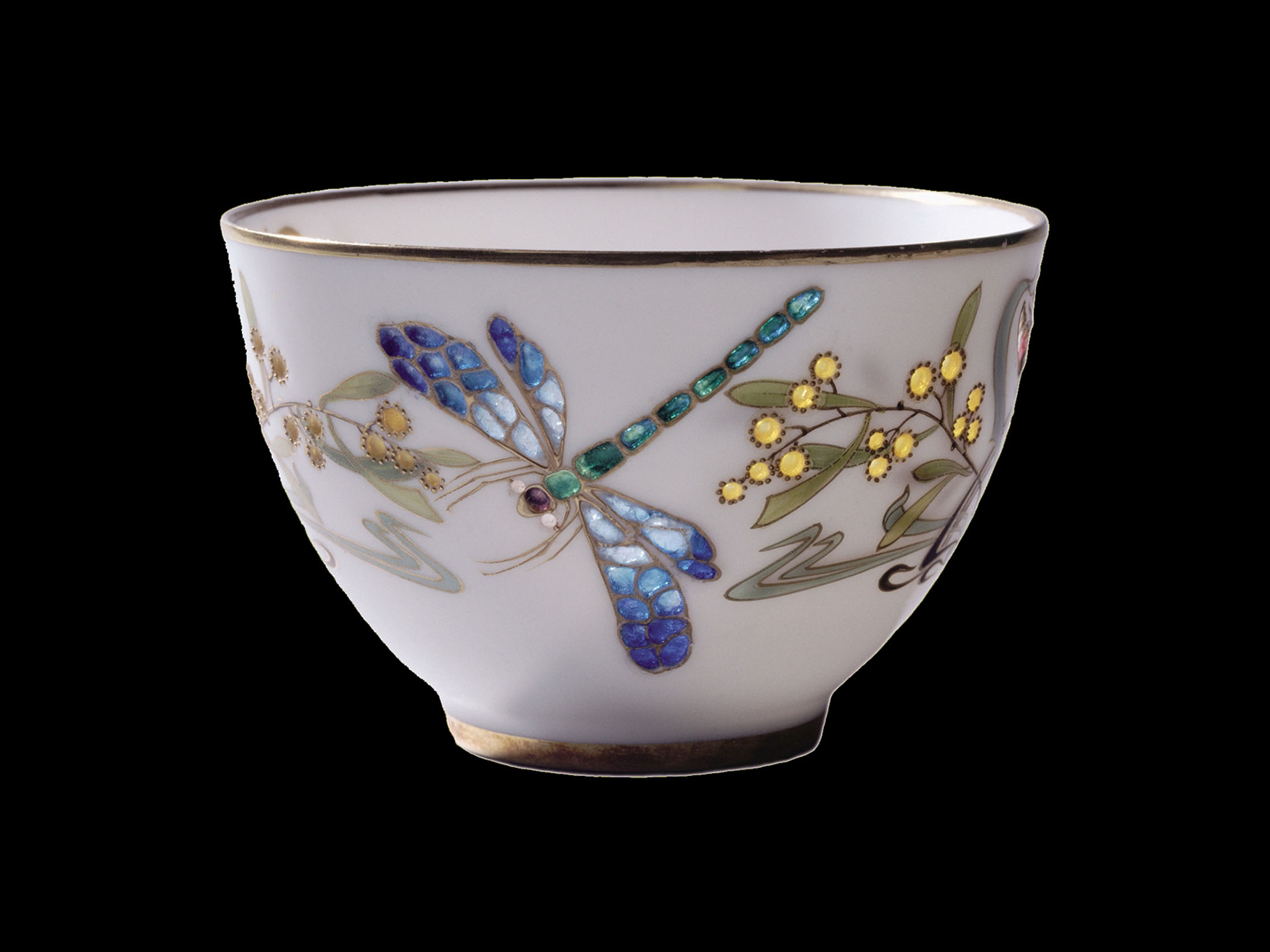
Dragonfly bowl, hard porcelain and translucent enamels, Limoges, Pouyat factory, between 1902 and 1906.

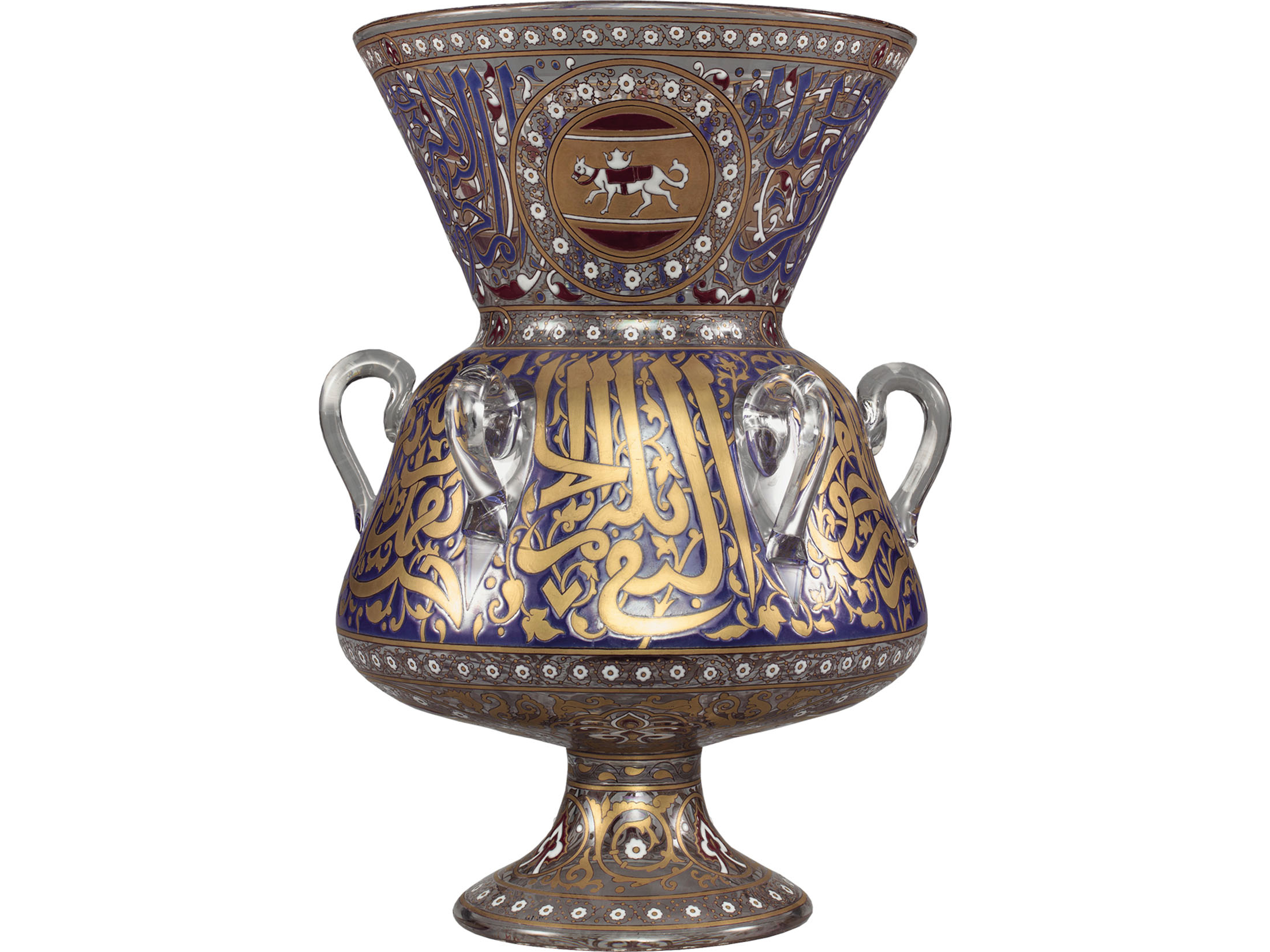
Mosque lamp, enamelled glass, Joseph Brocard factory, Paris, 1880.

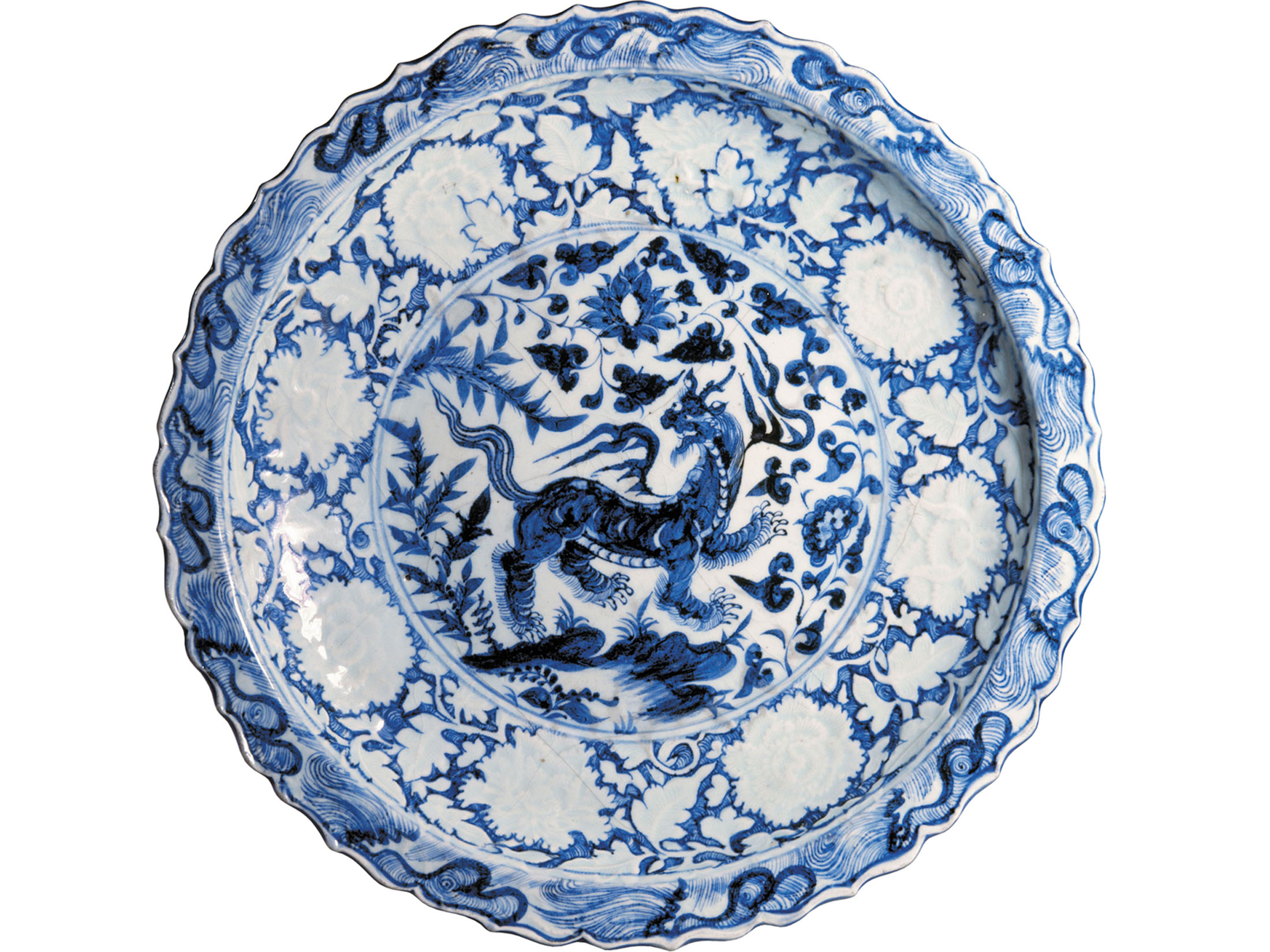
Baizi" dish, Jingdhezen kilns (China), hard porcelain, mid-14th century (Yuan dynasty).

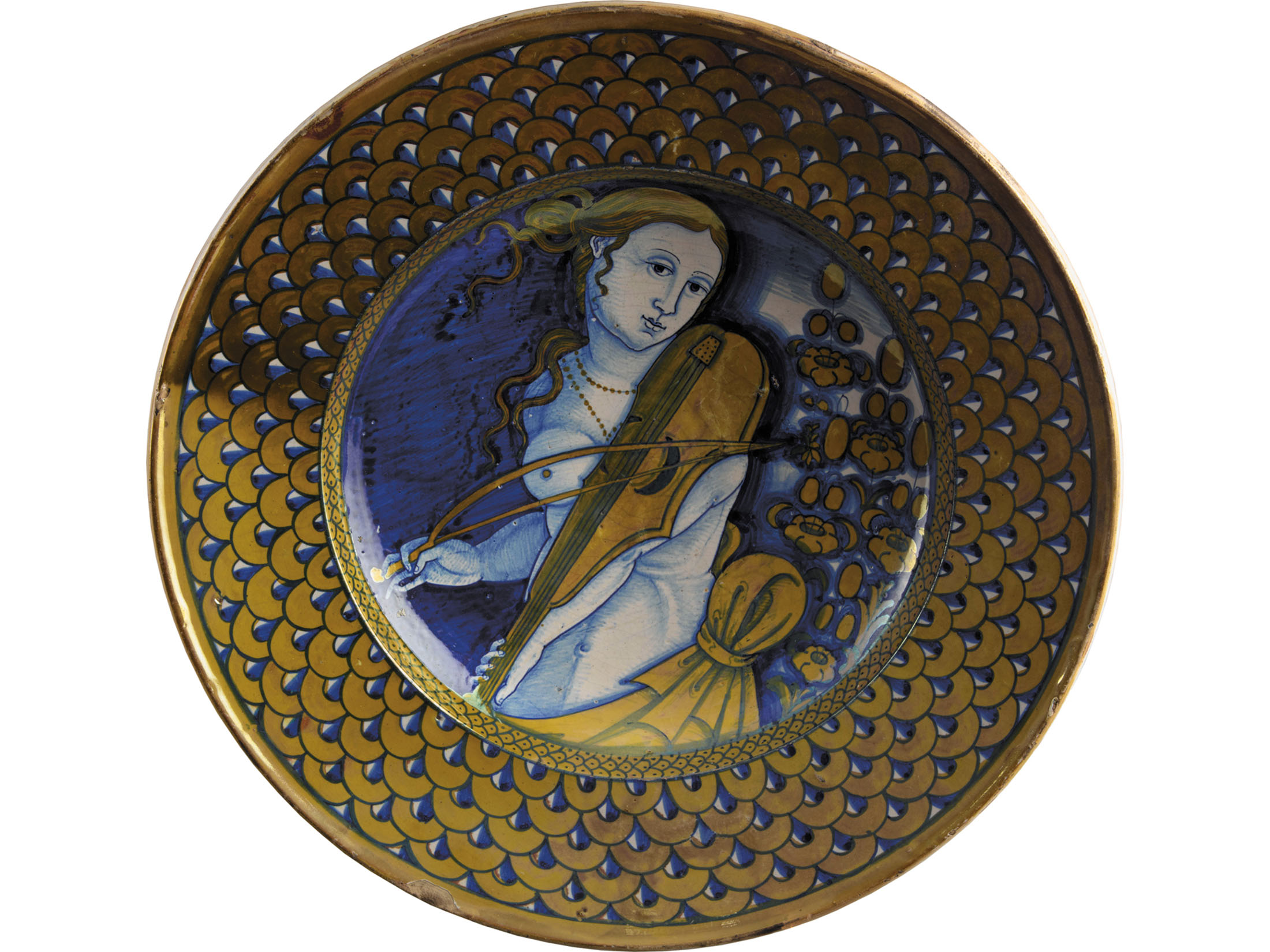
Woman with a viol dish, earthenware and metal lustre, Deruta (Italy), 16th century (on loan from the Louvre)
