= Pierre-Henri Mayeux =

French architect

- Born: July 12, 1845; France
- Died: February 6, 1929 (aged 83)
- Burial place: Cimetière de Belleville
- Education: Beaux-Arts de Paris
- Occupation: Architect
- Known for: Musée national Adrien-Dubouché

Pierre-Henri Mayeux (12 July 1845 – 6 February 1929) was a French architect and professor of decorative art at the Beaux-Arts de Paris.

== Biography ==
Pupil of François Guénepin at the Beaux-Arts de Paris in 1862. He twice came second in the Grand Prix de Rome in 1867 and 1868. He won the Sèvres prize in 1876 for a project for a monumental vase.

His pupils included Armand Bargas.

== Works ==
- Musée national Adrien-Dubouché (1845)
- Mayeux Vase (1877)

== Bibliography ==
- La Composition décorative, 1885, Paris: Société française d'Édition d'Art
- Fantaisies architecturales, Paris: Armand Guérinet
- Adaptation du décor à la forme, documents décoratifs modernes applicables à l'art industriel, S. Lagneau, preface by Henri Mayeux
